= List of foreign ministers in 2002 =

This is a list of foreign ministers in 2002.

== Africa ==
- Algeria - Abdelaziz Belkhadem (2000-2005)
- Angola - João Bernardo de Miranda (1999-2008)
- Benin - Antoine Idji Kolawolé (1998-2003)
- Botswana - Mompati Merafhe (1994-2008)
- Burkina Faso - Youssouf Ouedraogo (1999-2007)
- Burundi - Terence Sinunguruza (2001-2005)
- Cameroon - François Xavier Ngoubeyou (2001-2004)
- Cape Verde -
  1. Manuel Inocêncio Sousa (2001-2002)
  2. Fátima Veiga (2002-2004)
- Central African Republic - Agba Otikpo Mézodé (2001-2003)
- Chad - Mahamat Saleh Annadif (1997-2003)
- Comoros -
  1. Mohamed El-Amine Souef (1999-2002)
  2. Halidi Charif (2002)
  3. Mohamed El-Amine Souef (2002-2005)
- Republic of Congo - Rodolphe Adada (1997-2007)
- Democratic Republic of Congo - Léonard She Okitundu (2000-2003)
- Côte d'Ivoire - Abou Drahamane Sangare (2000-2003)
- Djibouti - Ali Abdi Farah (1999-2005)
- Egypt - Ahmed Maher (2001-2004)
- Equatorial Guinea - Santiago Nsobeya Efuman (1999-2003)
- Eritrea - Ali Said Abdella (2000-2005)
- Ethiopia - Seyoum Mesfin (1991-2010)
- Gabon - Jean Ping (1999-2008)
- The Gambia - Baboucarr-Blaise Jagne (2001-2004)
- Ghana - Hackman Owusu-Agyeman (2001-2003)
- Guinea -
  1. Mahawa Bangoura (2000-2002)
  2. François Lonseny Fall (2002-2004)
- Guinea-Bissau -
  1. Filomena Mascarenhas Tipote (2001-2002)
  2. Joãozinho Vieira Có (2002-2003)
- Kenya - Marsden Madoka (2001-2003)
- Lesotho -
  1. Tom Thabane (1998-2002)
  2. Mohlabi Tsekoa (2002-2004)
- Liberia - Monie Captan (1996-2003)
- Libya - Abdel Rahman Shalgham (2000-2009)
- Madagascar -
  1. Lila Ratsifandrihamanana (1998-2002)
  2. Azaly Ben Marofo (2002)
  3. Marcel Ranjeva (2002-2009)
- Malawi - Lilian Patel (2000-2004)
- Mali -
  1. Modibo Sidibe (1997-2002)
  2. Lassana Traoré (2002-2004)
- Mauritania -
  1. Dah Ould Abdi (2001-2002)
  2. Mohamed Ould Tolba (2002-2003)
- Mauritius - Anil Gayan (2000-2003)
- Morocco - Mohamed Benaissa (1999-2007)
  - Western Sahara - Mohamed Salem Ould Salek (1998–2023)
- Mozambique - Leonardo Simão (1994-2005)
- Namibia -
  1. Theo-Ben Gurirab (1990-2002)
  2. Hidipo Hamutenya (2002-2004)
- Niger - Aïchatou Mindaoudou (2001-2010)
- Nigeria - Sule Lamido (2000-2003)
- Rwanda -
  1. André Bumaya (2000-2002)
  2. Charles Murigande (2002-2008)
- São Tomé and Príncipe -
  1. Patrice Trovoada (2001-2002)
  2. Mateus Meira Rita (2002)
  3. Alda Bandeira (2002)
  4. Mateus Meira Rita (2002-2004)
- Senegal - Cheikh Tidiane Gadio (2000-2009)
- Seychelles - Jérémie Bonnelame (1997-2005)
- Sierra Leone -
  1. Ahmed Ramadan Dumbuya (2001-2002)
  2. Momodu Koroma (2002-2007)
- Somalia -
  1. Ismail Mahmud Hurre (2000-2002)
  2. Yusuf Hassan Ibrahim (2002-2004)
  - Somaliland -
    1. Abdihamid Garad Jama (2001-2002)
    2. Mohamed Said Gees (2002-2003)
- South Africa - Nkosazana Dlamini-Zuma (1999-2009)
- Sudan - Mustafa Osman Ismail (1998-2005)
- Swaziland - Abednego Ntshangase (2001-2003)
- Tanzania - Jakaya Kikwete (1995-2006)
- Togo -
  1. Joseph Kokou Koffigoh (2000-2002)
  2. Roland Kpotsra (2002-2003)
- Tunisia - Habib Ben Yahia (1999-2004)
- Uganda - James Wapakhabulo (2001-2004)
- Zambia -
  1. Keli Walubita (1997-2002)
  2. Katele Kalumba (2002)
  3. Kalombo Mwansa (2002-2005)
- Zimbabwe - Stan Mudenge (1995-2005)

== Asia ==
- Afghanistan - Abdullah Abdullah (2001-2006)
- Armenia - Vartan Oskanian (1998-2008)
- Azerbaijan - Vilayat Guliyev (1999-2004)
  - Nagorno-Karabakh -
    1. Naira Melkumian (1997-2002)
    2. Ashot Gulyan (2002-2004)
- Bahrain - Sheikh Muhammad ibn Mubarak ibn Hamad Al Khalifah (1971-2005)
- Bangladesh - Morshed Khan (2001-2006)
- Bhutan - Jigme Thinley (1998-2003)
- Brunei - Pengiran Muda Mohamed Bolkiah (1984–2015)
- Cambodia - Hor Namhong (1998–2016)
- China - Tang Jiaxuan (1998-2003)
- East Timor - José Ramos-Horta (2000-2006)
- Georgia - Irakli Menagarishvili (1995-2003)
  - Abkhazia - Sergei Shamba (1997-2004)
  - South Ossetia - Murat Dzhioyev (1998-2012)
- India -
  1. Jaswant Singh (1998-2002)
  2. Yashwant Sinha (2002-2004)
- Indonesia - Hassan Wirajuda (2001-2009)
- Iran - Kamal Kharazi (1997-2005)
- Iraq - Naji Sabri (2001-2003)
- Israel -
  1. Shimon Peres (2001-2002)
  2. Ariel Sharon (2002)
  3. Benjamin Netanyahu (2002-2003)
- Japan -
  1. Makiko Tanaka (2001-2002)
  2. Junichiro Koizumi (2002)
  3. Yoriko Kawaguchi (2002-2004)
- Jordan -
  1. Abdul Ilah Khatib (1998-2002)
  2. Marwan al-Muasher (2002-2004)
- Kazakhstan -
  1. Erlan Idrisov (1999-2002)
  2. Kassym-Jomart Tokayev (2002-2007)
- North Korea - Paek Nam-sun (1998-2007)
- South Korea -
  1. Han Seung-soo (2001-2002)
  2. Choi Sung Hong (2002-2003)
- Kuwait - Sheikh Sabah Al-Ahmad Al-Jaber Al-Sabah (1978-2003)
- Kyrgyzstan -
  1. Muratbek Imanaliyev (1997-2002)
  2. Askar Aitmatov (2002)
- Laos - Somsavat Lengsavad (1993-2006)
- Lebanon - Mahmoud Hammoud (2000-2003)
- Malaysia - Syed Hamid Albar (1999-2008)
- Maldives - Fathulla Jameel (1978-2005)
- Mongolia - Luvsangiin Erdenechuluun (2000-2004)
- Myanmar - Win Aung (1998-2004)
- Nepal -
  1. Sher Bahadur Deuba (2001-2002)
  2. Narendra Bikram Shah (2002-2003)
- Oman - Yusuf bin Alawi bin Abdullah (1982–2020)
- Pakistan -
  1. Abdul Sattar (1999-2002)
  2. Inam ul-Haq (2002)
  3. Khurshid Mahmud Kasuri (2002-2007)
- Philippines -
  1. Teofisto Guingona, Jr. (2001-2002)
  2. Gloria Macapagal Arroyo (2002)
  3. Blas Ople (2002-2003)
- Qatar - Sheikh Hamad bin Jassim bin Jaber Al Thani (1992-2013)
- Saudi Arabia - Prince Saud bin Faisal bin Abdulaziz Al Saud (1975–2015)
- Singapore - S. Jayakumar (1994-2004)
- Sri Lanka - Tyronne Fernando (2001-2004)
- Syria - Farouk al-Sharaa (1984-2006)
- Taiwan -
  1. Tien Hung-mao (2000-2002)
  2. Eugene Chien (2002-2004)
- Tajikistan - Talbak Nazarov (1994-2006)
- Thailand - Surakiart Sathirathai (2001-2005)
- Turkey -
  1. İsmail Cem (1997-2002)
  2. Şükrü Sina Gürel (2002)
  3. Yaşar Yakış (2002-2003)
- Turkmenistan - Raşit Meredow (2001–present)
- United Arab Emirates - Rashid Abdullah Al Nuaimi (1980-2006)
- Uzbekistan - Abdulaziz Komilov (1994-2003)
- Vietnam - Nguyễn Dy Niên (2000-2006)
- Yemen - Abu Bakr al-Qirbi (2001-2014)

== Australia and Oceania ==
- Australia - Alexander Downer (1996-2007)
- Fiji - Kaliopate Tavola (2000-2006)
- French Polynesia - Gaston Flosse (2000-2004)
- Kiribati - Teburoro Tito (1994-2003)
- Marshall Islands - Gerald Zackios (2001-2008)
- Micronesia - Ieske Iehsi (2001-2003)
- Nauru - René Harris (2001-2003)
- New Zealand - Phil Goff (1999-2005)
  - Cook Islands - Robert Woonton (1999-2004)
  - Niue -
    1. Sani Lakatani (1999-2002)
    2. Young Vivian (2002-2008)
- Palau - Temmy Shmull (2001-2009)
- Papua New Guinea -
  1. John Waiko (2001-2002)
  2. Sir Rabbie Namaliu (2002-2006)
- Samoa - Tuilaepa Sailele Malielegaoi (1998–2021)
- Solomon Islands -
  1. Alex Bartlett (2001-2002)
  2. Nollen Cornelius Leni (2002)
  3. Laurie Chan (2002-2006)
- Tonga - Prince 'Ulukalala Lavaka Ata (1998-2004)
- Tuvalu -
  1. Koloa Talake (2001-2002)
  2. Saufatu Sopoanga (2002-2004)
- Vanuatu -
  1. Alain Mahe (2001-2002)
  2. Serge Vohor (2002-2003)

== Europe ==
- Albania - Ilir Meta (2001–2003)
- Andorra - Juli Minoves Triquell (2001–2007)
- Austria - Benita Ferrero-Waldner (2000–2004)
- Belarus - Mikhail Khvostov (2000–2003)
- Belgium - Louis Michel (1999–2004)
  - Brussels-Capital Region - Guy Vanhengel (2000–2009)
  - Flanders -
    1. Paul Van Grembergen (2001–2002)
    2. Jaak Gabriëls (2002–2003)
- Bosnia and Herzegovina - Zlatko Lagumdžija (2001–2003)
- Bulgaria - Solomon Passy (2001–2005)
- Croatia - Tonino Picula (2000–2003)
- Cyprus - Ioannis Kasoulidis (1997–2003)
  - Northern Cyprus - Tahsin Ertuğruloğlu (1998–2004)
- Czech Republic -
  1. Jan Kavan (1998–2002)
  2. Cyril Svoboda (2002–2006)
- Denmark - Per Stig Møller (2001–2010)
- Estonia -
  1. Toomas Hendrik Ilves (1999–2002)
  2. Kristiina Ojuland (2002–2005)
- Finland - Erkki Tuomioja (2000–2007)
- France -
  1. Hubert Védrine (1997–2002)
  2. Dominique de Villepin (2002–2004)
- Germany - Joschka Fischer (1998–2005)
- Greece - George Papandreou (1999–2004)
- Hungary -
  1. János Martonyi (1998–2002)
  2. László Kovács (2002–2004)
- Iceland - Halldór Ásgrímsson (1995–2004)
- Ireland - Brian Cowen (2000–2004)
- Italy -
  1. Renato Ruggiero (2001–2002)
  2. Silvio Berlusconi (interim) (2002)
  3. Franco Frattini (2002–2004)
- Latvia -
  1. Indulis Bērziņš (1999–2002)
  2. Sandra Kalniete (2002–2004)
- Liechtenstein - Ernst Walch (2001–2005)
- Lithuania - Antanas Valionis (2000–2006)
- Luxembourg - Lydie Polfer (1999–2004)
- Republic of Macedonia -
  1. Slobodan Čašule (2001–2002)
  2. Ilinka Mitreva (2002–2006)
- Malta - Joe Borg (1999–2004)
- Moldova - Nicolae Dudău (2001–2004)
  - Transnistria - Valeriy Litskai (2000–2008)
- Netherlands -
  1. Jozias van Aartsen (1998–2002)
  2. Jaap de Hoop Scheffer (2002–2003)
- Norway - Jan Petersen (2001–2005)
- Poland - Włodzimierz Cimoszewicz (2001–2005)
- Portugal -
  1. Jaime Gama (1995–2002)
  2. António Martins da Cruz (2002–2003)
- Romania - Mircea Geoană (2000–2004)
- Russia - Igor Ivanov (1998–2004)
- San Marino -
  1. Gabriele Gatti (1986–2002)
  2. Augusto Casali (2002)
  3. Fiorenzo Stolfi (2002–2003)
- Slovakia - Eduard Kukan (1998–2006)
- Slovenia - Dimitrij Rupel (2000–2004)
- Spain -
  1. Josep Piqué (2000–2002)
  2. Ana de Palacio y del Valle-Lersundi (2002–2004)
- Sweden - Anna Lindh (1998–2003)
- Switzerland - Joseph Deiss (1999–2002)
- Ukraine - Anatoliy Zlenko (2000–2003)
- United Kingdom - Jack Straw (2001–2006)
- Vatican City - Archbishop Jean-Louis Tauran (1990–2003)
- Yugoslavia - Goran Svilanović (2000–2004)
  - Montenegro -
    1. Branko Lukovac (2000–2002)
    2. Dragan Đurović (acting) (2002–2003)

== North America and the Caribbean ==
- Antigua and Barbuda - Lester Bird (1991-2004)
- The Bahamas -
  1. Janet Bostwick (1994-2002)
  2. Fred Mitchell (2002-2007)
- Barbados - Billie Miller (1994-2008)
- Belize -
  1. Said Musa (1998-2002)
  2. Assad Shoman (2002-2003)
- Canada -
  1. John Manley (2000-2002)
  2. Bill Graham (2002-2004)
  - Quebec - Louise Beaudoin (1998-2003)
- Costa Rica -
  1. Roberto Rojas López (1998-2002)
  2. Roberto Tovar Faja (2002-2006)
- Cuba - Felipe Pérez Roque (1999-2009)
- Dominica - Osborne Riviere (2001-2005)
- Dominican Republic - Hugo Tolentino Dipp (2000-2003)
- El Salvador - María Eugenia Brizuela de Ávila (1999-2004)
- Grenada - Elvin Nimrod (2000-2008)
- Guatemala -
  1. Gabriel Orellana Rojas (2000-2002)
  2. Edgar Armando Gutiérrez Girón (2002-2004)
- Haiti - Joseph Philippe Antonio (2001-2004)
- Honduras -
  1. Roberto Flores Bermúdez (1999-2002)
  2. Guillermo Pérez Arias (2002-2003)
- Jamaica - Keith Desmond Knight (2001-2006)
- Mexico - Jorge Castañeda Gutman (2000-2003)
- Nicaragua -
  1. Francisco Aguirre Sacasa (2000-2002)
  2. Norman José Caldera Cardenal (2002-2007)
- Panama - José Miguel Alemán Healy (1999-2003)
- Puerto Rico – Ferdinand Mercado (2001–2003)
- Saint Kitts and Nevis - Timothy Harris (2001-2008)
- Saint Lucia - Julian Hunte (2001-2005)
- Saint Vincent and the Grenadines - Louis Straker (2001-2005)
- Trinidad and Tobago - Knowlson Gift (2001-2006)
- United States - Colin Powell (2001-2005)

== South America ==
- Argentina -
  1. José María Vernet (2001-2002)
  2. Carlos Ruckauf (2002-2003)
- Bolivia -
  1. Gustavo Fernández Saavedra (2001-2002)
  2. Carlos Saavedra Bruno (2002-2003)
- Brazil - Celso Lafer (2001-2003)
- Chile - Soledad Alvear (2000-2004)
- Colombia -
  1. Guillermo Fernández de Soto (1998-2002)
  2. Carolina Barco (2002-2006)
- Ecuador - Heinz Moeller Freile (2000-2003)
- Guyana - Rudy Insanally (2001-2008)
- Paraguay - José Antonio Moreno Ruffinelli (2001-2003)
- Peru -
  1. Diego García Sayán (2001-2002)
  2. Allan Wagner Tizón (2002-2003)
- Suriname - Marie Levens (2000-2005)
- Uruguay - Didier Opertti (1998-2005)
- Venezuela -
  1. Luis Alfonso Dávila (2001-2002)
  2. José Rodríguez Iturbe (2002)
  3. Luis Alfonso Dávila (2002)
  4. Roy Chaderton (2002-2004)
