= List of foreign ministers in 2003 =

This is a list of foreign ministers in 2003.

== Africa ==
- Algeria - Abdelaziz Belkhadem (2000-2005)
- Angola - João Bernardo de Miranda (1999-2008)
- Benin -
  1. Antoine Idji Kolawolé (1998-2003)
  2. Joseph Gnonlonfoun (acting) (2003)
  3. Rogatien Biaou (2003-2006)
- Botswana - Mompati Merafhe (1994-2008)
- Burkina Faso - Youssouf Ouedraogo (1999-2007)
- Burundi - Terence Sinunguruza (2001-2005)
- Cameroon - François Xavier Ngoubeyou (2001-2004)
- Cape Verde - Fátima Veiga (2002-2004)
- Central African Republic -
  1. Agba Otikpo Mézodé (2001-2003)
  2. Martial Beti Marace (2003)
  3. Karim Meckassoua (2003)
  4. Charles Wénézoui (2003-2005)
- Chad -
  1. Mahamat Saleh Annadif (1997-2003)
  2. Nagoum Yamassoum (2003-2005)
- Comoros - Mohamed El-Amine Souef (2002-2005)
- Republic of Congo - Rodolphe Adada (1997-2007)
- Democratic Republic of Congo -
  1. Léonard She Okitundu (2000-2003)
  2. Antoine Ghonda (2003-2004)
- Côte d'Ivoire -
  1. Abou Drahamane Sangare (2000-2003)
  2. Bamba Mamadou (2003-2006)
- Djibouti - Ali Abdi Farah (1999-2005)
- Egypt - Ahmed Maher (2001-2004)
- Equatorial Guinea -
  1. Santiago Nsobeya Efuman (1999-2003)
  2. Pastor Micha Ondó Bile (2003-2012)
- Eritrea - Ali Said Abdella (2000-2005)
- Ethiopia - Seyoum Mesfin (1991-2010)
- Gabon - Jean Ping (1999-2008)
- The Gambia - Baboucarr-Blaise Jagne (2001-2004)
- Ghana -
  1. Hackman Owusu-Agyeman (2001-2003)
  2. Nana Akufo-Addo (2003-2007)
- Guinea - François Lonseny Fall (2002-2004)
- Guinea-Bissau -
  1. Joãozinho Vieira Có (2002-2003)
  2. Fatumata Djau Baldé (2003)
  3. João José Monteiro (2003-2004)
- Kenya -
  1. Marsden Madoka (2001-2003)
  2. Kalonzo Musyoka (2003-2004)
- Lesotho - Mohlabi Tsekoa (2002-2004)
- Liberia -
  1. Monie Captan (1996-2003)
  2. Lewis Brown (2003)
  3. Thomas Nimely (2003-2006)
- Libya - Abdel Rahman Shalgham (2000-2009)
- Madagascar - Marcel Ranjeva (2002-2009)
- Malawi - Lilian Patel (2000-2004)
- Mali - Lassana Traoré (2002-2004)
- Mauritania -
  1. Mohamed Ould Tolba (2002-2003)
  2. Mohamed Vall Ould Bellal (2003-2005)
- Mauritius -
  1. Anil Gayan (2000-2003)
  2. Jaya Krishna Cuttaree (2003-2005)
- Morocco - Mohamed Benaissa (1999-2007)
  - Western Sahara - Mohamed Salem Ould Salek (1998–2023)
- Mozambique - Leonardo Simão (1994-2005)
- Namibia - Hidipo Hamutenya (2002-2004)
- Niger - Aïchatou Mindaoudou (2001-2010)
- Nigeria -
  1. Sule Lamido (2000-2003)
  2. Oluyemi Adeniji (2003-2006)
- Rwanda - Charles Murigande (2002-2008)
- São Tomé and Príncipe - Mateus Meira Rita (2002-2004)
- Senegal - Cheikh Tidiane Gadio (2000-2009)
- Seychelles - Jérémie Bonnelame (1997-2005)
- Sierra Leone - Momodu Koroma (2002-2007)
- Somalia - Yusuf Hassan Ibrahim (2002-2004)
  - Somaliland -
    1. Mohamed Said Gees (2002-2003)
    2. Edna Adan Ismail (2003-2006)
- South Africa - Nkosazana Dlamini-Zuma (1999-2009)
- Sudan - Mustafa Osman Ismail (1998-2005)
- Swaziland -
  1. Abednego Ntshangase (2001-2003)
  2. Roy Fanourakis (2003)
  3. Mabili Dlamini (2003-2006)
- Tanzania - Jakaya Kikwete (1995-2006)
- Togo -
  1. Roland Kpotsra (2002-2003)
  2. Kokou Tozoun (2003-2005)
- Tunisia - Habib Ben Yahia (1999-2004)
- Uganda - James Wapakhabulo (2001-2004)
- Zambia - Kalombo Mwansa (2002-2005)
- Zimbabwe - Stan Mudenge (1995-2005)

== Asia ==
- Afghanistan - Abdullah Abdullah (2001-2006)
- Armenia - Vartan Oskanian (1998-2008)
- Azerbaijan - Vilayat Guliyev (1999-2004)
  - Nagorno-Karabakh - Ashot Gulyan (2002-2004)
- Bahrain - Sheikh Muhammad ibn Mubarak ibn Hamad Al Khalifah (1971-2005)
- Bangladesh - Morshed Khan (2001-2006)
- Bhutan -
  1. Jigme Thinley (1998-2003)
  2. Khandu Wangchuk (2003-2007)
- Brunei - Pengiran Muda Mohamed Bolkiah (1984–2015)
- Cambodia - Hor Namhong (1998–2016)
- China -
  1. Tang Jiaxuan (1998-2003)
  2. Li Zhaoxing (2003-2007)
- East Timor - José Ramos-Horta (2000-2006)
- Georgia -
  1. Irakli Menagarishvili (1995-2003)
  2. Merab Antadze (acting) (2003)
  3. Tedo Japaridze (2003-2004)
  - Abkhazia - Sergei Shamba (1997-2004)
  - South Ossetia - Murat Dzhioyev (1998-2012)
- India - Yashwant Sinha (2002-2004)
- Indonesia - Hassan Wirajuda (2001-2009)
- Iran - Kamal Kharazi (1997-2005)
- Iraq -
  1. Naji Sabri (2001-2003)
  2. Muhammad Amin Ahmad (2003)
  3. Hoshyar Zebari (2003–2014)
- Israel -
  1. Benjamin Netanyahu (2002-2003)
  2. Silvan Shalom (2003-2006)
  - Palestinian Authority - Nabil Shaath (2003-2005)
- Japan - Yoriko Kawaguchi (2002-2004)
- Jordan - Marwan al-Muasher (2002-2004)
- Kazakhstan - Kassym-Jomart Tokayev (2002-2007)
- North Korea - Paek Nam-sun (1998-2007)
- South Korea -
  1. Choi Sung Hong (2002-2003)
  2. Yoon Young-kwan (2003-2004)
- Kuwait -
  1. Sheikh Sabah Al-Ahmad Al-Jaber Al-Sabah (1978-2003)
  2. Sheikh Mohammad Sabah Al-Salem Al-Sabah (2003-2011)
- Kyrgyzstan - Askar Aitmatov (2002-2005)
- Laos - Somsavat Lengsavad (1993-2006)
- Lebanon -
  1. Mahmoud Hammoud (2000-2003)
  2. Jean Obeid (2003-2004)
- Malaysia - Syed Hamid Albar (1999-2008)
- Maldives - Fathulla Jameel (1978-2005)
- Mongolia - Luvsangiin Erdenechuluun (2000-2004)
- Myanmar - Win Aung (1998-2004)
- Nepal -
  1. Narendra Bikram Shah (2002-2003)
  2. Surya Bahadur Thapa (2003-2004)
- Oman - Yusuf bin Alawi bin Abdullah (1982–2020)
- Pakistan - Khurshid Mahmud Kasuri (2002-2007)
- Philippines -
  1. Blas Ople (2002-2003)
  2. Franklin Ebdalin (acting) (2003)
  3. Gloria Macapagal Arroyo (2003)
  4. Delia Albert (2003-2004)
- Qatar - Sheikh Hamad bin Jassim bin Jaber Al Thani (1992-2013)
- Saudi Arabia - Prince Saud bin Faisal bin Abdulaziz Al Saud (1975–2015)
- Singapore - S. Jayakumar (1994-2004)
- Sri Lanka - Tyronne Fernando (2001-2004)
- Syria - Farouk al-Sharaa (1984-2006)
- Taiwan - Eugene Chien (2002-2004)
- Tajikistan - Talbak Nazarov (1994-2006)
- Thailand - Surakiart Sathirathai (2001-2005)
- Turkey -
  1. Yaşar Yakış (2002-2003)
  2. Abdullah Gül (2003-2007)
- Turkmenistan - Raşit Meredow (2001–present)
- United Arab Emirates - Rashid Abdullah Al Nuaimi (1980-2006)
- Uzbekistan -
  1. Abdulaziz Komilov (1994-2003)
  2. Sodiq Safoyev (2003-2005)
- Vietnam - Nguyễn Dy Niên (2000-2006)
- Yemen - Abu Bakr al-Qirbi (2001-2014)

== Australia and Oceania ==
- Australia - Alexander Downer (1996-2007)
- Fiji - Kaliopate Tavola (2000-2006)
- French Polynesia - Gaston Flosse (2000-2004)
- Kiribati -
  1. Teburoro Tito (1994-2003)
  2. Tion Otang (2003)
  3. Anote Tong (2003–2016)
- Marshall Islands - Gerald Zackios (2001-2008)
- Micronesia -
  1. Ieske Iehsi (2001-2003)
  2. David Panuelo (acting) (2003)
  3. Sebastian Anefal (2003-2007)
- Nauru -
  1. René Harris (2001-2003)
  2. Bernard Dowiyogo (2003)
  3. René Harris (2003)
  4. Bernard Dowiyogo (2003)
  5. Derog Gioura (2003)
  6. Ludwig Scotty (2003)
  7. René Harris (2003-2004)
- New Zealand - Phil Goff (1999-2005)
  - Cook Islands - Robert Woonton (1999-2004)
  - Niue - Young Vivian (2002-2008)
- Palau - Temmy Shmull (2001-2009)
- Papua New Guinea - Sir Rabbie Namaliu (2002-2006)
- Samoa - Tuilaepa Sailele Malielegaoi (1998–2021)
- Solomon Islands - Laurie Chan (2002-2006)
- Tonga - Prince 'Ulukalala Lavaka Ata (1998-2004)
- Tuvalu - Saufatu Sopoanga (2002-2004)
- Vanuatu -
  1. Serge Vohor (2002-2003)
  2. Moana Carcasses Kalosil (2003-2004)

== Europe ==
- Albania -
  1. Ilir Meta (2001-2003)
  2. Luan Hajdaraga (acting) (2003)
  3. Kastriot Islami (2003-2005)
- Andorra - Juli Minoves Triquell (2001-2007)
- Austria - Benita Ferrero-Waldner (2000-2004)
- Belarus -
  1. Mikhail Khvostov (2000-2003)
  2. Sergei Martynov (2003-2012)
- Belgium - Louis Michel (1999-2004)
  - Brussels-Capital Region - Guy Vanhengel (2000-2009)
  - Flanders -
    1. Jaak Gabriëls (2002-2003)
    2. Patricia Ceysens (2003-2004)
- Bosnia and Herzegovina -
  1. Zlatko Lagumdžija (2001-2003)
  2. Mladen Ivanić (2003-2007)
- Bulgaria - Solomon Passy (2001-2005)
- Croatia -
  1. Tonino Picula (2000-2003)
  2. Miomir Žužul (2003-2005)
- Cyprus -
  1. Ioannis Kasoulidis (1997-2003)
  2. Georgios Iacovou (2003-2006)
  - Northern Cyprus - Tahsin Ertuğruloğlu (1998-2004)
- Czech Republic - Cyril Svoboda (2002-2006)
- Denmark - Per Stig Møller (2001-2010)
  - Greenland - Josef Motzfeldt (2003-2007)
- Estonia - Kristiina Ojuland (2002-2005)
- Finland - Erkki Tuomioja (2000-2007)
- France - Dominique de Villepin (2002-2004)
- Germany - Joschka Fischer (1998-2005)
- Greece - George Papandreou (1999-2004)
- Hungary - László Kovács (2002-2004)
- Iceland - Halldór Ásgrímsson (1995-2004)
- Ireland - Brian Cowen (2000-2004)
- Italy - Franco Frattini (2002-2004)
- Latvia - Sandra Kalniete (2002-2004)
- Liechtenstein - Ernst Walch (2001-2005)
- Lithuania - Antanas Valionis (2000-2006)
- Luxembourg - Lydie Polfer (1999-2004)
- Republic of Macedonia - Ilinka Mitreva (2002-2006)
- Malta - Joe Borg (1999-2004)
- Moldova - Nicolae Dudău (2001-2004)
  - Transnistria - Valeriy Litskai (2000-2008)
- Netherlands -
  1. Jaap de Hoop Scheffer (2002-2003)
  2. Ben Bot (2003-2007)
- Norway - Jan Petersen (2001-2005)
- Poland - Włodzimierz Cimoszewicz (2001-2005)
- Portugal -
  1. António Martins da Cruz (2002-2003)
  2. Teresa Patrício de Gouveia (2003-2004)
- Romania - Mircea Geoană (2000-2004)
- Russia - Igor Ivanov (1998-2004)
- San Marino -
  1. Fiorenzo Stolfi (2002-2003)
  2. Fabio Berardi (2003-2006)
- Serbia and Montenegro - Goran Svilanović (2000-2004)
  - Montenegro -
    1. Dragan Đurović (acting) (2002-2003)
    2. Dragiša Burzan (2003-2004)
- Slovakia - Eduard Kukan (1998-2006)
- Slovenia - Dimitrij Rupel (2000-2004)
- Spain - Ana de Palacio y del Valle-Lersundi (2002-2004)
- Sweden -
  1. Anna Lindh (1998-2003)
  2. Jan O. Karlsson (acting) (2003)
  3. Laila Freivalds (2003-2006)
- Switzerland -
  1. Micheline Calmy-Rey (2003-2011)
- Ukraine -
  1. Anatoliy Zlenko (2000-2003)
  2. Kostyantyn Gryshchenko (2003-2005)
- United Kingdom - Jack Straw (2001-2006)
- Vatican City -
  1. Archbishop Jean-Louis Tauran (1990-2003)
  2. Archbishop Giovanni Lajolo (2003-2006)

== North America and the Caribbean ==
- Antigua and Barbuda - Lester Bird (1991-2004)
- The Bahamas - Fred Mitchell (2002-2007)
- Barbados - Billie Miller (1994-2008)
- Belize -
  1. Assad Shoman (2002-2003)
  2. Godfrey Smith (2003-2006)
- Canada - Bill Graham (2002-2004)
  - Quebec -
    1. Louise Beaudoin (1998-2003)
    2. Monique Gagnon-Tremblay (2003-2008)
- Costa Rica - Roberto Tovar Faja (2002-2006)
- Cuba - Felipe Pérez Roque (1999-2009)
- Dominica - Osborne Riviere (2001-2005)
- Dominican Republic -
  1. Hugo Tolentino Dipp (2000-2003)
  2. Frank Guerrero Prats (2003-2004)
- El Salvador - María Eugenia Brizuela de Ávila (1999-2004)
- Grenada - Elvin Nimrod (2000-2008)
- Guatemala - Edgar Armando Gutiérrez Girón (2002-2004)
- Haiti - Joseph Philippe Antonio (2001-2004)
- Honduras -
  1. Guillermo Pérez Arias (2002-2003)
  2. Aníbal Quiñónez (2003)
  3. Leonidas Rosa Bautista (2003-2005)
- Jamaica - Keith Desmond Knight (2001-2006)
- Mexico -
  1. Jorge Castañeda Gutman (2000-2003)
  2. Luis Ernesto Derbez (2003-2006)
- Nicaragua - Norman José Caldera Cardenal (2002-2007)
- Panama -
  1. José Miguel Alemán Healy (1999-2003)
  2. Harmodio Arias Cerjack (2003-2004)
- Puerto Rico –
  1. Ferdinand Mercado (2001–2003)
  2. Jose Izquierdo Encarnacion (2003–2005)
- Saint Kitts and Nevis - Timothy Harris (2001-2008)
- Saint Lucia - Julian Hunte (2001-2004)
- Saint Vincent and the Grenadines - Louis Straker (2001-2005)
- Trinidad and Tobago - Knowlson Gift (2001-2006)
- United States - Colin Powell (2001-2005)

== South America ==
- Argentina -
  1. Carlos Ruckauf (2002-2003)
  2. Rafael Bielsa (2003-2005)
- Bolivia -
  1. Carlos Saavedra Bruno (2002-2003)
  2. Juan Ignacio Siles (2003-2005)
- Brazil -
  1. Celso Lafer (2001-2003)
  2. Celso Amorim (2003-2011)
- Chile - Soledad Alvear (2000-2004)
- Colombia - Carolina Barco (2002-2006)
- Ecuador -
  1. Heinz Moeller Freile (2000-2003)
  2. Nina Pacari (2003)
  3. Patricio Zuquilanda (2003-2005)
- Guyana - Rudy Insanally (2001-2008)
- Paraguay -
  1. José Antonio Moreno Ruffinelli (2001-2003)
  2. Leila Rachid de Cowles (2003-2006)
- Peru -
  1. Allan Wagner Tizón (2002-2003)
  2. Manuel Rodríguez Cuadros (2003-2005)
- Suriname - Marie Levens (2000-2005)
- Uruguay - Didier Opertti (1998-2005)
- Venezuela - Roy Chaderton (2002-2004)
