= List of foreign ministers in 1999 =

This is a list of foreign ministers in 1999.

== Africa ==
- Algeria -
  1. Ahmed Attaf (1996-1999)
  2. Youcef Yousfi (1999-2000)
- Angola -
  1. Venâncio da Silva Moura (1992-1999)
  2. João Bernardo de Miranda (1999-2008)
- Benin - Antoine Idji Kolawolé (1998-2003)
- Botswana - Mompati Merafhe (1994-2008)
- Burkina Faso -
  1. Ablassé Ouedraogo (1994-1999)
  2. Youssouf Ouedraogo (1999-2007)
- Burundi - Severin Ntahomvukiye (1998-2001)
- Cameroon - Augustin Kontchou Kouomegni (1997-2001)
- Cape Verde - José Luís de Jesus (1998-2000)
- Central African Republic -
  1. Jean-Mette Yapende (1997-1999)
  2. Marcel Metefara (1999-2001)
- Chad - Mahamat Saleh Annadif (1997-2003)
- Comoros -
  1. Nidhoim Attoumane (1998-1999)
  2. Mohamed El-Amine Souef (1999-2002)
- Republic of Congo - Rodolphe Adada (1997-2007)
- Democratic Republic of Congo -
  1. Jean-Charles Okoto (1998-1999)
  2. Abdoulaye Yerodia Ndombasi (1999-2000)
- Côte d'Ivoire - Amara Essy (1990-2000)
- Djibouti -
  1. Mohamed Moussa Chehem (1995-1999)
  2. Ali Abdi Farah (1999-2005)
- Egypt - Amr Moussa (1991-2001)
- Equatorial Guinea -
  1. Miguel Oyono Ndong Mifumu (1993-1999)
  2. Santiago Nsobeya Efuman (1999-2003)
- Eritrea - Haile Woldetensae (1997-2000)
- Ethiopia - Seyoum Mesfin (1991-2010)
- Gabon -
  1. Casimir Oyé-Mba (1994-1999)
  2. Jean Ping (1999-2008)
- The Gambia - Momodou Lamin Sedat Jobe (1998-2001)
- Ghana - Victor Gbeho (1997-2001)
- Guinea -
  1. Lamine Camara (1996-1999)
  2. Zainoul Abidine Sanoussy (1999-2000)
- Guinea-Bissau -
  1. Fernando Delfim da Silva (1996-1999)
  2. Hilia Barber (1999)
  3. José Pereira Baptista (1999-2000)
- Kenya - Bonaya Godana (1998-2001)
- Lesotho - Tom Thabane (1998-2002)
- Liberia - Monie Captan (1996-2003)
- Libya - Umar Mustafa al-Muntasir (1992-2000)
- Madagascar - Lila Ratsifandrihamanana (1998-2002)
- Malawi -
  1. Mapopa Chipeta (1997-1999)
  2. Brown Mpinganjira (1999-2000)
- Mali - Modibo Sidibe (1997-2002)
- Mauritania - Ahmed Ould Sid'Ahmed (1998-2001)
- Mauritius - Rajkeswur Purryag (1997-2000)
- Morocco -
  1. Abdellatif Filali (1985-1999)
  2. Mohamed Benaissa (1999-2007)
  - Western Sahara - Mohamed Salem Ould Salek (1998–2023)
- Mozambique - Leonardo Simão (1994-2005)
- Namibia - Theo-Ben Gurirab (1990-2002)
- Niger -
  1. Maman Sambo Sidikou (1997-1999)
  2. Aïchatou Mindaoudou (1999-2000)
- Nigeria -
  1. Ignatius Olisemeka (1998-1999)
  2. Sule Lamido (1999-2003)
- Rwanda -
  1. Anastase Gasana (1994-1999)
  2. Amri Sued Ismail (1999)
  3. Augustin Iyamuremye (1999-2000)
- São Tomé and Príncipe -
  1. Homero Jeronimo Salvaterra (1996-1999)
  2. Alberto Paulino (1999)
  3. Paulo Jorge Espirito Santo (1999-2000)
- Senegal - Jacques Baudin (1998-2000)
- Seychelles - Jérémie Bonnelame (1997-2005)
- Sierra Leone - Sama Banya (1998-2001)
- Somalia - no central government
  - Somaliland - Mahmud Salah Nur (1997-2001)
- South Africa -
  1. Alfred Baphethuxolo Nzo (1994-1999)
  2. Nkosazana Dlamini-Zuma (1999-2009)
- Sudan - Mustafa Osman Ismail (1998-2005)
- Swaziland - Albert Nhlanhla Shabangu (1998-2001)
- Tanzania - Jakaya Kikwete (1995-2006)
- Togo - Joseph Kokou Koffigoh (1998-2000)
- Tunisia -
  1. Said Ben Mustapha (1997-1999)
  2. Habib Ben Yahia (1999-2004)
- Uganda - Eriya Kategaya (1996-2001)
- Zambia - Keli Walubita (1997-2002)
- Zimbabwe - Stan Mudenge (1995-2005)

== Asia ==
- Afghanistan -
  1. Mullah Mohammad Hassan (1998-1999)
  2. Wakil Ahmed Muttawakil (1999-2001)
- Armenia - Vartan Oskanian (1998-2008)
- Azerbaijan -
  1. Tofig Zulfugarov (1998-1999)
  2. Vilayat Guliyev (1999-2004)
  - Nagorno-Karabakh - Naira Melkumian (1997-2002)
- Bahrain - Sheikh Muhammad ibn Mubarak ibn Hamad Al Khalifah (1971-2005)
- Bangladesh - Abdus Samad Azad (1996-2001)
- Bhutan - Jigme Thinley (1998-2003)
- Brunei - Pengiran Muda Mohamed Bolkiah (1984–2015)
- Cambodia - Hor Namhong (1998–2016)
- China - Tang Jiaxuan (1998-2003)
- Georgia - Irakli Menagarishvili (1995-2003)
  - Abkhazia - Sergei Shamba (1997-2004)
  - South Ossetia - Murat Dzhioyev (1998-2012)
- India - Jaswant Singh (1998-2002)
- Indonesia -
  1. Ali Alatas (1988-1999)
  2. Alwi Shihab (1999-2001)
- Iran - Kamal Kharazi (1997-2005)
- Iraq - Muhammad Saeed al-Sahhaf (1992-2001)
- Israel -
  1. Ariel Sharon (1998-1999)
  2. David Levy (1999-2000)
- Japan -
  1. Masahiko Kōmura (1998-1999)
  2. Yōhei Kōno (1999-2001)
- Jordan - Abdul Ilah Khatib (1998-2002)
- Kazakhstan -
  1. Kassym-Jomart Tokayev (1994-1999)
  2. Erlan Idrisov (1999-2002)
- North Korea - Paek Nam-sun (1998-2007)
- South Korea - Hong Soon-young (1998-2000)
- Kuwait - Sheikh Sabah Al-Ahmad Al-Jaber Al-Sabah (1978-2003)
- Kyrgyzstan - Muratbek Imanaliyev (1997-2002)
- Laos - Somsavat Lengsavad (1993-2006)
- Lebanon - Selim al-Hoss (1998-2000)
- Malaysia -
  1. Abdullah Ahmad Badawi (1991-1999)
  2. Syed Hamid Albar (1999-2008)
- Maldives - Fathulla Jameel (1978-2005)
- Mongolia - Nyam-Osoryn Tuyaa (1998-2000)
- Myanmar - Win Aung (1998-2004)
- Nepal -
  1. Girija Prasad Koirala (1998-1999)
  2. Krishna Prasad Bhattarai (1999)
  3. Ram Sharan Mahat (1999-2000)
- Oman - Yusuf bin Alawi bin Abdullah (1982–2020)
- Pakistan -
  1. Sartaj Aziz (1998-1999)
  2. Abdul Sattar (1999-2002)
- Philippines - Domingo Siazon, Jr. (1995-2001)
- Qatar - Sheikh Hamad bin Jassim bin Jaber Al Thani (1992-2013)
- Saudi Arabia - Prince Saud bin Faisal bin Abdulaziz Al Saud (1975–2015)
- Singapore - S. Jayakumar (1994-2004)
- Sri Lanka - Lakshman Kadirgamar (1994-2001)
- Syria - Farouk al-Sharaa (1984-2006)
- Taiwan -
  1. Jason Hu (1997-1999)
  2. Chen Chien-jen (1999-2000)
- Tajikistan - Talbak Nazarov (1994-2006)
- Thailand - Surin Pitsuwan (1997-2001)
- Turkey - İsmail Cem (1997-2002)
- Turkmenistan - Boris Şyhmyradow (1995-2000)
- United Arab Emirates - Rashid Abdullah Al Nuaimi (1980-2006)
- Uzbekistan - Abdulaziz Komilov (1994-2003)
- Vietnam - Nguyễn Mạnh Cầm (1991-2000)
- Yemen - Abdul Qadir Bajamal (1998-2001)

== Australia and Oceania ==
- Australia - Alexander Downer (1996-2007)
- Fiji -
  1. Berenado Vunibobo (1997-1999)
  2. Tupeni Baba (1999-2000)
- Kiribati - Teburoro Tito (1994-2003)
- Marshall Islands - Phillip H. Muller (1994-2000)
- Micronesia - Epel K. Ilon (1997-2000)
- Nauru -
  1. Bernard Dowiyogo (1998-1999)
  2. René Harris (1999-2000)
- New Zealand -
  1. Don McKinnon (1990-1999)
  2. Phil Goff (1999-2005)
  - Cook Islands -
    1. Inatio Akaruru (1989-1999)
    2. Joe Williams (1999)
    3. Robert Woonton (1999-2004)
  - Niue - Sani Lakatani (1999-2002)
- Palau - Sabino Anastacio (1997-2000)
- Papua New Guinea -
  1. Roy Yaki (1997-1999)
  2. Sir Michael Somare (1999)
  3. Sir John Kaputin (1999-2000)
- Samoa - Tuilaepa Sailele Malielegaoi (1998–2021)
- Solomon Islands - Patterson Oti (1997-2000)
- Tonga - Prince 'Ulukalala Lavaka Ata (1998-2004)
- Tuvalu -
  1. Bikenibeu Paeniu (1996-1999)
  2. Ionatana Ionatana (1999-2000)
- Vanuatu -
  1. Clement Leo (1998-1999)
  2. Serge Vohor (1999-2001)

== Europe ==
- Albania - Paskal Milo (1997-2001)
- Andorra - Albert Pintat (1997-2001)
- Austria - Wolfgang Schüssel (1995-2000)
- Belarus - Ural Latypov (1998-2000)
- Belgium -
  1. Erik Derycke (1995-1999)
  2. Louis Michel (1999-2004)
  - Brussels-Capital Region -
    1. Jos Chabert (1989-1999)
    2. Annemie Neyts-Uyttebroeck (1999-2000)
  - Flanders -
    1. Luc Van den Brande (1992-1999)
    2. Patrick Dewael (1999-2001)
  - Wallonia - William Ancion (1996-1999)
- Bosnia and Herzegovina - Jadranko Prlić (1996-2001)
- Bulgaria - Nadezhda Mihailova (1997-2001)
- Croatia - Mate Granić (1993-2000)
- Cyprus - Ioannis Kasoulidis (1997-2003)
  - Northern Cyprus - Tahsin Ertuğruloğlu (1998-2004)
- Czech Republic - Jan Kavan (1998-2002)
- Denmark - Niels Helveg Petersen (1993-2000)
- Estonia -
  1. Raul Mälk (1998-1999)
  2. Toomas Hendrik Ilves (1999-2002)
- Finland - Tarja Halonen (1995-2000)
- France - Hubert Védrine (1997-2002)
- Germany - Joschka Fischer (1998-2005)
- Greece -
  1. Theodoros Pangalos (1996-1999)
  2. George Papandreou (1999-2004)
- Hungary - János Martonyi (1998-2002)
- Iceland - Halldór Ásgrímsson (1995-2004)
- Ireland - David Andrews (1997-2000)
- Italy - Lamberto Dini (1996-2001)
- Latvia -
  1. Valdis Birkavs (1994-1999)
  2. Indulis Bērziņš (1999-2002)
- Liechtenstein - Andrea Willi (1993-2001)
- Lithuania - Algirdas Saudargas (1996-2000)
- Luxembourg -
  1. Jacques Poos (1984-1999)
  2. Lydie Polfer (1999-2004)
- Republic of Macedonia - Aleksandar Dimitrov (1998-2000)
- Malta -
  1. Guido de Marco (1998-1999)
  2. Joe Borg (1999-2004)
- Moldova - Nicolae Tăbăcaru (1997-2000)
- Netherlands - Jozias van Aartsen (1998-2002)
- Norway - Knut Vollebæk (1997-2000)
- Poland - Bronisław Geremek (1997-2000)
- Portugal - Jaime Gama (1995-2002)
- Romania -
  1. Andrei Pleşu (1997-1999)
  2. Petre Roman (1999-2000)
- Russia - Igor Ivanov (1998-2004)
  - Chechnya -
    - the government went into exile in 2000
    1. Akhyad Idigov (1998-1999)
    2. Ilyas Akhmadov (1999-2005)
- San Marino - Gabriele Gatti (1986-2002)
- Slovakia - Eduard Kukan (1998-2006)
- Slovenia - Boris Frlec (1997-2000)
- Spain - Abel Matutes (1996-2000)
- Sweden - Anna Lindh (1998-2003)
- Switzerland -
  1. Flavio Cotti (1993-1999)
  2. Joseph Deiss (1999-2002)
- Ukraine - Borys Tarasyuk (1998-2000)
- United Kingdom - Robin Cook (1997-2001)
- Vatican City - Archbishop Jean-Louis Tauran (1990-2003)
- Yugoslavia - Živadin Jovanović (1998-2000)
  - Montenegro - Branko Perović (1997-2000)

== North America and the Caribbean ==
- Antigua and Barbuda - Lester Bird (1991-2004)
- The Bahamas - Janet Bostwick (1994-2002)
- Barbados - Billie Miller (1994-2008)
- Belize - Said Musa (1998-2002)
- Canada - Lloyd Axworthy (1996-2000)
  - Quebec - Louise Beaudoin (1998-2003)
- Costa Rica - Roberto Rojas López (1998-2002)
- Cuba -
  1. Roberto Robaina (1993-1999)
  2. Felipe Pérez Roque (1999-2009)
- Dominica - Norris Charles (1998-2000)
- Dominican Republic - Eduardo Latorre Rodríguez (1996-2000)
- El Salvador -
  1. Ramón Ernesto González Giner (1995-1999)
  2. María Eugenia Brizuela de Ávila (1999-2004)
- Grenada -
  1. Mark Isaac (1998-1999)
  2. Keith Mitchell (1999)
  3. Mark Isaac (1999-2000)
- Guatemala - Eduardo Stein (1996-2000)
- Haiti - Fritz Longchamp (1995-2001)
- Honduras -
  1. Fernando Martínez Jiménez (1998-1999)
  2. Roberto Flores Bermúdez (1999-2002)
- Jamaica - Seymour Mullings (1995-2000)
- Mexico - Rosario Green (1998-2000)
- Nicaragua - Eduardo Montealegre (1998-2000)
- Panama -
  1. Jorge Eduardo Ritter (1998-1999)
  2. José Miguel Alemán Healy (1999-2003)
- Puerto Rico –
  1. Norma Burgos (1995–1999)
  2. Angel Morey (1999–2001)
- Saint Kitts and Nevis - Denzil Douglas (1995-2000)
- Saint Lucia - George Odlum (1997-2001)
- Saint Vincent and the Grenadines - Allan Cruickshank (1998-2001)
- Trinidad and Tobago - Ralph Maraj (1995-2000)
- United States - Madeleine Albright (1997-2001)

== South America ==
- Argentina -
  1. Guido di Tella (1991-1999)
  2. Adalberto Rodríguez Giavarini (1999-2001)
- Bolivia - Javier Murillo de la Rocha (1997-2001)
- Brazil - Luiz Felipe Palmeira Lampreia (1995-2001)
- Chile -
  1. José Miguel Insulza (1994-1999)
  2. Juan Gabriel Valdés (1999-2000)
- Colombia - Guillermo Fernández de Soto (1998-2002)
- Ecuador -
  1. José Ayala Lasso (1997-1999)
  2. Benjamín Ortiz Brennan (1999-2000)
- Guyana - Clement Rohee (1992-2001)
- Paraguay -
  1. Dido Florentin Bogado (1998-1999)
  2. Miguel Abdón Saguier (1999)
  3. José Félix Fernández Estigarribia (1999-2000)
- Peru - Fernando de Trazegnies (1998-2000)
- Suriname - Errol Snijders (1997-2000)
- Uruguay - Didier Opertti (1998-2005)
- Venezuela -
  1. Miguel Ángel Burelli Rivas (1994-1999)
  2. José Vicente Rangel (1999-2001)
