= Roberto Flores =

Roberto Flores may mean:

- Carlos Roberto Flores (born 1950), Honduran politician, president in 1998–2002
- Roberto Flores Álvarez (1909–1984), Chilean poet and politician
- Roberto Flores Bermúdez, Honduran diplomat and politician
- Lil Rob (born 1975), U.S. singer
