= Azaly Ben Marofo =

Malagasy foreign minister (born 1946)

Azaly Ben Marofo (born 1946) is a former Malagasy foreign minister. In February 2002, when President Marc Ravalomanana won election, Ben Marofo was his initial choice as foreign minister. However, he was replaced in May by Marcel Ranjeva. He was the second of three foreign ministers in 2002. He was the 14th person to hold the position since independence.

== Sources ==
- List of Malagasy foreign ministers since independence rulers.org
