= Aytmatov =

Aitmatov (Kyrgyz: Aytmatov, Айтматов, Russian: Айтма́тов) is a Russianized Kyrgyz surname. Notable people with the surname include:

- Askar Aitmatov (born 1959), Kyrgyzstani politician, son of Chinghiz Aitmatov
- Chinghiz Aitmatov (1928–2008), Kyrgyzstani writer
