= List of foreign ministers in 2007 =

This is a list of foreign ministers in 2007.

== Africa ==
- Algeria –
  1. Mohammed Bedjaoui (2005–2007)
  2. Mourad Medelci (2007–2013)
- Angola – João Bernardo de Miranda (1999–2008)
- Benin –
  1. Mariam Aladji Boni Diallo (2006–2007)
  2. Moussa Okanla (2007–2008)
- Botswana – Mompati Merafhe (1994–2008)
- Burkina Faso –
  1. Youssouf Ouédraogo (1999–2007)
  2. Djibril Bassolé (2007–2008)
- Burundi – Antoinette Batumubwira (2005–2009)
- Cameroon –
  1. Jean-Marie Atangana Mebara (2006–2007)
  2. Henri Eyebe Ayissi (2007–2011)
- Cape Verde – Víctor Borges (2004–2008)
- Central African Republic – Côme Zoumara (2006–2008)
- Chad – Ahmad Allam-Mi (2005–2008)
- Comoros – Ahmed Ben Said Jaffar (2006–2010)
- Republic of Congo –
  1. Rodolphe Adada (1997–2007)
  2. Basile Ikouébé (2007–2015)
- Democratic Republic of Congo –
  1. Raymond Ramazani Baya (2004–2007)
  2. Antipas Mbusa Nyamwisi (2007–2008)
- Côte d'Ivoire – Youssouf Bakayoko (2006–2010)
- Djibouti – Mahamoud Ali Youssouf (2005–present)
- Egypt – Ahmed Aboul Gheit (2004–2011)
- Equatorial Guinea – Pastor Micha Ondó Bile (2003–2012)
- Eritrea –
  1. Mohamed Omer (acting) (2005–2007)
  2. Osman Saleh Mohammed (2007–present)
- Ethiopia – Seyoum Mesfin (1991–2010)
- Gabon – Jean Ping (1999–2008)
- The Gambia –
  1. Bala Garba Jahumpa (2006–2007)
  2. Crispin Grey-Johnson (2007–2008)
- Ghana –
  1. Nana Akufo-Addo (2003–2007)
  2. Akwasi Osei-Adjei (2007–2009)
- Guinea –
  1. Mamady Condé (2006–2007)
  2. Kabèlè Abdoul Camara (2007–2008)
- Guinea-Bissau –
  1. António Isaac Monteiro (2005–2007)
  2. Maria da Conceição Nobre Cabral (2007–2009)
- Kenya – Raphael Tuju (2005–2008)
- Lesotho –
  1. Monyane Moleleki (2004–2007)
  2. Mohlabi Tsekoa (2007–2015)
- Liberia –
  1. George Wallace (2006–2007)
  2. Olubanke King-Akerele (2007–2010)
- Libya – Abdel Rahman Shalgham (2000–2009)
- Madagascar – Marcel Ranjeva (2002–2009)
- Malawi – Joyce Banda (2006–2009)
- Mali – Moctar Ouane (2004–2011)
- Mauritania –
  1. Ahmed Ould Sid'Ahmed (2005–2007)
  2. Mohamed Saleck Ould Mohamed Lemine (2007–2008)
- Mauritius – Madan Dulloo (2005–2008)
- Morocco –
  1. Mohamed Benaissa (1999–2007)
  2. Taieb Fassi Fihri (2007–2012)
  - Western Sahara – Mohamed Salem Ould Salek (1998–2023)
- Mozambique – Alcinda Abreu (2005–2008)
- Namibia – Marco Hausiku (2004–2010)
- Niger – Aïchatou Mindaoudou (2001–2010)
- Nigeria –
  1. Joy Ogwu (2006–2007)
  2. Ojo Maduekwe (2007–2010)
- Rwanda – Charles Murigande (2002–2008)
- São Tomé and Príncipe –
  1. Carlos Gustavo dos Anjos (2006–2007)
  2. Ovídio Manuel Barbosa Pequeno (2007–2008)
- Senegal – Cheikh Tidiane Gadio (2000–2009)
- Seychelles – Patrick Pillay (2005–2009)
- Sierra Leone –
  1. Momodu Koroma (2002–2007)
  2. Zainab Bangura (2007–2010)
- Somalia –
  1. Ismail Mahmud Hurre (2006–2007)
  2. Hussein Elabe Fahiye (2007)
  3. Muhammad Ali Hamoud (2007–2008)
  - Somaliland – Abdillahi Mohamed Duale (2006–2010)
  - Puntland – Ali Abdi Aware (2007–2008)
- South Africa – Nkosazana Dlamini-Zuma (1999–2009)
- Sudan –
  1. Lam Akol (2005–2007)
  2. Deng Alor (2007–2010)
- Swaziland – Moses Mathendele Dlamini (2006–2008)
- Tanzania –
  1. Asha-Rose Migiro (2006–2007)
  2. Bernard Membe (2007–2015)
- Togo –
  1. Zarifou Ayéva (2005–2007)
  2. Léopold Gnininvi (2007–2008)
- Tunisia – Abdelwahab Abdallah (2005–2010)
- Uganda – Sam Kutesa (2005–2021)
- Zambia –
  1. Mundia Sikatana (2006–2007)
  2. Kabinga Pande (2007–2011)
- Zimbabwe – Simbarashe Mumbengegwi (2005–2017)

== Asia ==
- Afghanistan – Rangin Dadfar Spanta (2006–2010)
- Armenia – Vartan Oskanian (1998–2008)
- Azerbaijan – Elmar Mammadyarov (2004–2020)
  - Nagorno-Karabakh – Georgy Petrosyan (2005–2011)
- Bahrain – Sheikh Khalid ibn Ahmad Al Khalifah (2005–2020)
- Bangladesh –
  1. Iajuddin Ahmed (2006–2007)
  2. Fakhruddin Ahmed (2007)
  3. Iftekhar Ahmed Chowdhury (2007–2009)
- Bhutan –
  1. Khandu Wangchuk (2003–2007)
  2. Yeshey Dorji (acting) (2007–2008)
- Brunei – Pengiran Muda Mohamed Bolkiah (1984–2015)
- Cambodia – Hor Namhong (1998–2016)
- China –
  1. Li Zhaoxing (2003–2007)
  2. Yang Jiechi (2007–2013)
- East Timor –
  1. José Luís Guterres (2006–2007)
  2. Adalgisa Magno Guterres (acting) (2007)
  3. Zacarias da Costa (2007–2012)
- Georgia – Gela Bezhuashvili (2005–2008)
  - Abkhazia – Sergei Shamba (2004–2010)
  - South Ossetia – Murat Dzhioyev (1998–2012)
- India – Pranab Mukherjee (2006–2009)
- Indonesia – Hassan Wirajuda (2001–2009)
- Iran – Manouchehr Mottaki (2005–2010)
- Iraq – Hoshyar Zebari (2003–2014)
  - Kurdistan – Falah Mustafa Bakir (2006–2019)
- Israel – Tzipi Livni (2006–2009)
  - Palestinian Authority –
    1. Mahmoud al-Zahar (2006–2007)
    2. Ziad Abu Amr (2007)
    3. Salam Fayyad (2007)
    4. Riyad al-Maliki (2007–present)
- Japan –
  1. Taro Aso (2005–2007)
  2. Nobutaka Machimura (2007)
  3. Masahiko Kōmura (2007–2008)
- Jordan –
  1. Abdul Ilah Khatib (2005–2007)
  2. Salah Bashir (2007–2009)
- Kazakhstan –
  1. Kassym-Jomart Tokayev (2002–2007)
  2. Marat Tazhin (2007–2009)
- North Korea –
  1. Paek Nam-sun (1998–2007)
  2. Kang Sok-ju (acting) (2007)
  3. Pak Ui-chun (2007–2014)
- South Korea – Song Min-soon (2006–2008)
- Kuwait – Sheikh Mohammad Sabah Al-Salem Al-Sabah (2003–2011)
- Kyrgyzstan –
  1. Alikbek Jekshenkulov (2005–2007)
  2. Ednan Karabayev (2007–2009)
- Laos – Thongloun Sisoulith (2006–2016)
- Lebanon –
  - Fawzi Salloukh (2005–2009)
  - Tarek Mitri (acting) (2006–2008)
- Malaysia – Syed Hamid Albar (1999–2008)
- Maldives –
  1. Ahmed Shaheed (2005–2007)
  2. Abdullah Shahid (2007–2008)
- Mongolia –
  1. Nyamaa Enkhbold (2006–2007)
  2. Sanjaasürengiin Oyuun (2007–2008)
- Myanmar – Nyan Win (2004–2011)
- Nepal –
  1. Khadga Prasad Oli (2006–2007)
  2. Sahana Pradhan (2007–2008)
- Oman – Yusuf bin Alawi bin Abdullah (1982–2020)
- Pakistan –
  1. Khurshid Mahmud Kasuri (2002–2007)
  2. Inam-ul-Haq (2007–2008)
- Philippines – Alberto Romulo (2004–2011)
- Qatar – Sheikh Hamad bin Jassim bin Jaber Al Thani (1992–2013)
- Saudi Arabia – Prince Saud bin Faisal bin Abdul Aziz (1975–2015)
- Singapore – George Yeo (2004–2011)
- Sri Lanka –
  1. Mangala Samaraweera (2005–2007)
  2. Rohitha Bogollagama (2007–2010)
- Syria – Walid Muallem (2006–2020)
- Taiwan – James C. F. Huang (2006–2008)
- Tajikistan – Khamrokhon Zaripov (2006–2013)
- Thailand – Nitya Pibulsonggram (2006–2008)
- Turkmenistan – Raşit Meredow (2001–present)
- United Arab Emirates – Sheikh Abdullah bin Zayed Al Nahyan (2006–present)
- Uzbekistan – Vladimir Norov (2006–2010)
- Vietnam – Phạm Gia Khiêm (2006–2011)
- Yemen – Abu Bakr al-Qirbi (2001–2014)

== Europe ==
- Albania –
  1. Besnik Mustafaj (2005–2007)
  2. Lulzim Basha (2007–2009)
- Andorra –
  1. Juli Minoves Triquell (2001–2007)
  2. Meritxell Mateu i Pi (2007–2009)
- Austria – Ursula Plassnik (2004–2008)
- Belarus – Sergei Martynov (2003–2012)
- Belgium – Karel De Gucht (2004–2009)
  - Brussels-Capital Region – Guy Vanhengel (2000–2009)
  - Flanders – Geert Bourgeois (2004–2008)
  - Wallonia – Marie-Dominique Simonet (2004–2009)
- Bosnia and Herzegovina –
  1. Mladen Ivanić (2003–2007)
  2. Sven Alkalaj (2007–2012)
- Bulgaria – Ivailo Kalfin (2005–2009)
- Croatia – Kolinda Grabar-Kitarović (2005–2008)
- Cyprus –
  1. Giorgos Lillikas (2006–2007)
  2. Erato Kozakou-Marcoullis (2007–2008)
  - Northern Cyprus – Turgay Avcı (2006–2009)
- Czech Republic –
  1. Alexandr Vondra (2006–2007)
  2. Karel Schwarzenberg (2007–2009)
- Denmark – Per Stig Møller (2001–2010)
  - Greenland –
    1. Josef Motzfeldt (2003–2007)
    2. Lars Emil Johansen (2007)
    3. Aleqa Hammond (2007–2008)
- Estonia – Urmas Paet (2005–2014)
- Finland –
  1. Erkki Tuomioja (2000–2007)
  2. Ilkka Kanerva (2007–2008)
- France –
  1. Philippe Douste-Blazy (2005–2007)
  2. Bernard Kouchner (2007–2010)
- Germany – Frank-Walter Steinmeier (2005–2009)
- Greece – Dora Bakoyannis (2006–2009)
- Hungary – Kinga Göncz (2006–2009)
- Iceland –
  1. Valgerður Sverrisdóttir (2006–2007)
  2. Ingibjörg Sólrún Gísladóttir (2007–2009)
- Ireland – Dermot Ahern (2004–2008)
- Italy – Massimo D'Alema (2006–2008)
- Latvia –
  1. Artis Pabriks (2004–2007)
  2. Helēna Demakova (acting) (2007)
  3. Māris Riekstiņš (2007–2010)
- Liechtenstein – Rita Kieber-Beck (2005–2009)
- Lithuania – Petras Vaitiekūnas (2006–2008)
- Luxembourg – Jean Asselborn (2004–present)
- Republic of Macedonia – Antonio Milošoski (2006–2011)
- Malta – Michael Frendo (2004–2008)
- Moldova – Andrei Stratan (2004–2009)
  - Transnistria – Valeriy Litskai (2000–2008)
- Monaco –
  1. Henri Fissore (2006–2007)
  2. Jean Pastorelli (2007–2008)
- Montenegro – Milan Roćen (2006–2012)
- Netherlands –
  1. Ben Bot (2003–2007)
  2. Maxime Verhagen (2007–2010)
- Norway – Jonas Gahr Støre (2005–2012)
- Poland –
  1. Anna Fotyga (2006–2007)
  2. Radosław Sikorski (2007–2014)
- Portugal – Luís Amado (2006–2011)
- Romania –
  1. Mihai Răzvan Ungureanu (2004–2007)
  2. Călin Popescu-Tăriceanu (acting) (2007)
  3. Adrian Cioroianu (2007–2008)
- Russia – Sergey Lavrov (2004–present)
- San Marino – Fiorenzo Stolfi (2006–2008)
- Serbia –
  1. Vuk Drašković (2004–2007)
  2. Vuk Jeremić (2007–2012)
- Slovakia – Ján Kubiš (2006–2009)
- Slovenia – Dimitrij Rupel (2004–2008)
- Spain – Miguel Ángel Moratinos (2004–2010)
- Sweden – Carl Bildt (2006–2014)
- Switzerland – Micheline Calmy-Rey (2003–2011)
- Turkey –
  1. Abdullah Gül (2003–2007)
  2. Ali Babacan (2007–2009)
- Ukraine –
  1. Borys Tarasyuk (2005–2007)
  2. Volodymyr Ohryzko (acting) (2007)
  3. Arseniy Yatsenyuk (2007)
  4. Volodymyr Ohryzko (2007–2009)
- United Kingdom –
  1. Margaret Beckett (2006–2007)
  2. David Miliband (2007–2010)
  - Scotland – Linda Fabiani (2007–2009)
- Vatican City – Archbishop Dominique Mamberti (2006–2014)

== North America and the Caribbean ==
- Antigua and Barbuda – Baldwin Spencer (2005–2014)
- The Bahamas –
  1. Fred Mitchell (2002–2007)
  2. Brent Symonette (2007–2012)
- Barbados – Dame Billie Miller (1994–2008)
- Belize –
  1. Eamon Courtenay (2006–2007)
  2. Lisa Shoman (2007–2008)
- Canada –
  1. Peter MacKay (2006–2007)
  2. Maxime Bernier (2007–2008)
  - Quebec – Monique Gagnon-Tremblay (2003–2008)
- Costa Rica – Bruno Stagno Ugarte (2006–2010)
- Cuba – Felipe Pérez Roque (1999–2009)
- Dominica –
  1. Charles Savarin (2005–2007)
  2. Roosevelt Skerrit (2007–2008)
- Dominican Republic – Carlos Morales Troncoso (2004–2014)
- El Salvador – Francisco Laínez (2004–2008)
- Grenada – Elvin Nimrod (2000–2008)
- Guatemala – Gert Rosenthal (2006–2008)
- Haiti – Jean Rénald Clérismé (2006–2008)
- Honduras – Milton Jiménez (2006–2008)
- Jamaica –
  1. Anthony Hylton (2006–2007)
  2. Kenneth Baugh (2007–2012)
- Mexico – Patricia Espinosa (2006–2012)
- Netherlands Antilles – Emily de Jongh-Elhage (2006–2010)
- Nicaragua
  1. Norman José Caldera Cardenal (2002–2007)
  2. Samuel Santos López (2007–2017)
- Panama – Samuel Lewis Navarro (2004–2009)
- Puerto Rico – Fernando Bonilla (2005–2009)
- Saint Kitts and Nevis – Timothy Harris (2001–2008)
- Saint Lucia –
  1. Rufus Bousquet (2006–2007)
  2. Stephenson King (2007–2009)
- Saint Vincent and the Grenadines – Sir Louis Straker (2005–2010)
- Trinidad and Tobago –
  1. Arnold Piggott (2006–2007)
  2. Paula Gopee-Scoon (2007–2010)
- United States – Condoleezza Rice (2005–2009)

== Oceania ==
- Australia –
  1. Alexander Downer (1996–2007)
  2. Stephen Smith (2007–2010)
- Fiji –
  1. Isikeli Mataitoga (acting) (2006–2007)
  2. Ratu Epeli Nailatikau (2007–2008)
- French Polynesia –
  1. Gaston Tong Sang (2006–2007)
  2. Oscar Temaru (2007–2008)
- Kiribati – Anote Tong (2003–2016)
- Marshall Islands – Gerald Zackios (2001–2008)
- Micronesia –
  1. Sebastian Anefal (2003–2007)
  2. Lorin S. Robert (2007–2019)
- Nauru –
  1. David Adeang (2004–2007)
  2. Kieren Keke (2007–2011)
- New Zealand – Winston Peters (2005–2008)
  - Cook Islands – Wilkie Rasmussen (2005–2009)
  - Niue – Young Vivian (2002–2008)
- Palau – Temmy Shmull (2001–2009)
- Papua New Guinea –
  1. Paul Tiensten (2006–2007)
  2. Sam Abal (2007–2010)
- Samoa – Tuilaepa Aiono Sailele Malielegaoi (1998–2021)
- Solomon Islands –
  1. Patteson Oti (2006–2007)
  2. William Haomae (2007–2010)
- Tonga – Sonatane Tu'a Taumoepeau Tupou (2004–2009)
- Tuvalu – Apisai Ielemia (2006–2010)
- Vanuatu –
  1. Sato Kilman (2004–2007)
  2. George Wells (2007–2008)

== South America ==
- Argentina – Jorge Taiana (2005–2010)
- Bolivia – David Choquehuanca (2006–2017)
- Brazil – Celso Amorim (2003–2011)
- Chile – Alejandro Foxley (2006–2009)
- Colombia –
  1. María Consuelo Araújo (2006–2007)
  2. Fernando Araújo Perdomo (2007–2008)
- Ecuador –
  1. Francisco Carrión (2005–2007)
  2. María Fernanda Espinosa (2007)
  3. María Isabel Salvador (2007–2008)
- Guyana – Rudy Insanally (2001–2008)
- Paraguay – Rubén Ramírez Lezcano (2006–2008)
- Peru – José Antonio García Belaúnde (2006–2011)
- Suriname – Lygia Kraag-Keteldijk (2005–2010)
- Uruguay – Reinaldo Gargano (2005–2008)
- Venezuela – Nicolás Maduro (2006–2013)
