= List of foreign ministers in 1990 =

This is a list of foreign ministers in 1990.

== Africa ==
Flag	Country	Foreign minister	Term
(Algeria)	Algeria	Sid Ahmed Ghozali	1989-1991
(Angola)	Angola	Pedro de Castro van Dúnem	1989-1992
(Benin) (Benin)	Benin	Daniel Tawéma; Théophile Nata	1989-1990; 1990-1991
(Botswana)	Botswana	Gaositwe K.T. Chiepe	1985-1994
(Burkina Faso)	Burkina Faso	Prosper Vokouma	1989-1992
(Burundi)	Burundi	Cyprien Mbonimpa	1987-1992
(Cameroon)	Cameroon	Jacques-Roger Booh-Booh	1988-1992
(Cape Verde)	Cape Verde	Silvino Manuel da Luz	1981-1991
(Central African Republic)	Central African Republic	Michel Gbezera-Bria; Laurent Gomina-Pampali	1988-1990; 1990-1992
(Chad)	Chad	Acheikh ibn Oumar; Soungui Ahmad	1989-1990; 1990-1992
(Comoros)	Comoros	Said Kafe; Mtara Maécha	1982-1990; 1990-1991
(Republic of the Congo)	Congo	Antoine Ndinga Oba	1985-1991
(Djibouti)	Djibouti	Moumin Bahdon Farah	1978-1993
(Egypt)	Egypt	Ahmed Asmat Abdel-Meguid	1984-1991
(Equatorial Guinea)	Equatorial Guinea	Marcelino Nguema Onguene; Santiago Eneme Ovono	1983-1990; 1990-1992
(Ethiopia)	Ethiopia	Tesfaye Dinka	1989-1991
(Gabon)	Gabon	Ali Bongo Ondimba	1989-1991
(The Gambia)	The Gambia	Omar Sey	1987-1994
(Ghana)	Ghana	Obed Asamoah	1981-1997
(Guinea)	Guinea	Jean Traoré	1985-1993
(Guinea-Bissau)	Guinea-Bissau	Júlio Semedo	1984-1992
(Ivory Coast)	Ivory Coast	Siméon Aké; Amara Essy	1977-1990; 1990-2000
(Kenya)	Kenya	Robert Ouko; Wilson Ndolo Ayah	1988-1990; 1990-1993
(Lesotho)	Lesotho	Thaabe Letsie; Tom Thabane	1988-1990; 1990-1991
(Liberia)	Liberia	J. Rudolph Johnson; Gabriel Bacchus Matthews	1987-1990; 1990-1993
(Libya)	Libya	Jadallah Azzuz at-Talhi; Ibrahim al-Bishari	1987-1990; 1990-1992
(Madagascar)	Madagascar	Jean Bemananjara	1983-1991
(Malawi)	Malawi	Hastings Banda	1964-1993
(Mali)	Mali	N'Golo Traoré	1989-1991
(Mauritania)	Mauritania	Sid'Ahmed Ould Baba; Hasni Ould Didi	1989-1990; 1990-1992
(Mauritius)	Mauritius	Sir Satcam Boolell; Madan Dulloo; Jean-Claude de l'Estrac	1986-1990; 1990; 1990-1991
(Morocco)	Morocco	Abdellatif Filali	1985-1999
(Mozambique)	Mozambique	Pascoal Mocumbi	1987-1994
(Namibia)	Namibia	Theo-Ben Gurirab	1990-2002
(Niger)	Niger	Mahamane Sani Bako	1989-1991
(Nigeria)	Nigeria	Rilwanu Lukman; Ike Nwachukwu	1989-1990; 1990-1993
(Rwanda)	Rwanda	Casimir Bizimungu	1989-1992
(São Tomé and Príncipe)	São Tomé and Príncipe	Carlos Graça; Guilherme Posser da Costa	1988-1990; 1990-1991
(Senegal)	Senegal	Ibrahima Fall; Seydina Oumar Sy	1984-1990; 1990-1991
(Seychelles)	Seychelles	Danielle de St. Jorre	1989-1997
(Sierra Leone)	Sierra Leone	Abdul Karim Koroma	1985-1992
(Somalia)	Somalia	Abdirahman Jama Barre; Ali Ahmed Jama Jangali; Ahmed Muhammad Aden	1989-1990; 1990; 1990-1991
(South Africa)	South Africa	Pik Botha	1977-1994
(Sudan)	Sudan	Ali Sahloul	1989-1993
(Eswatini)	Swaziland	Sir George Mbikwakhe Mamba	1987-1993
(Tanzania)	Tanzania	Benjamin Mkapa; Ahmed Hassan Diria	1984-1990; 1990-1993
(Togo)	Togo	Yaovi Adodo	1987-1991
(Tunisia)	Tunisia	Abdelhamid Escheikh; Ismail Khelil; Habib Boularès	1988-1990; 1990; 1990-1991
(Uganda)	Uganda	Paul Ssemogerere	1988-1994
(Western Sahara)	Western Sahara	Mohamed Salem Ould Salek	1988-1995
(Zaire)	Zaire	Jean Nguza Karl-i-Bond; Mushobekwa Kalimba Wa Katana	1988-1990; 1990-1991
(Zambia)	Zambia	Luke Mwananshiku; Benjamin Mibenge	1986-1990; 1990-1991
(Zimbabwe)	Zimbabwe	Nathan Shamuyarira	1987-1995

== Asia ==
Flag	Country	Foreign minister	Term
(Afghanistan)	Afghanistan	Abdul Wakil	1986-1992
(Bahrain)	Bahrain	Sheikh Muhammad ibn Mubarak ibn Hamad Al Khalifah	1971-2005
(Bangladesh)	Bangladesh	Anisul Islam Mahmud; Fakhruddin Ahmed	1988-1990; 1990-1991
(Bhutan)	Bhutan	Dawa Tsering	1972-1998
(Brunei)	Brunei	Pengiran Muda Mohamed Bolkiah	1984–2015
(Cambodia)	Cambodia	Hun Sen; Hor Namhong	1987-1990; 1990-1993
(China)	China (People's Republic)	Qian Qichen	1988-1998
(India)	India	I. K. Gujral; Vidya Charan Shukla	1989-1990; 1990-1991
(Indonesia)	Indonesia	Ali Alatas	1988-1999
(Iran)	Iran	Ali Akbar Velayati	1981-1997
(Iraq)	Iraq	Tariq Aziz	1983-1991
(Israel)	Israel	Moshe Arens; David Levy	1988-1990; 1990-1992
(Japan)	Japan	Taro Nakayama	1989-1991
(Jordan)	Jordan	Marwan al-Qasim	1988-1991
(North Korea)	North Korea	Kim Yong-nam	1983-1998
(South Korea)	South Korea	Choe Ho-jung; Yi Sang-ok	1988-1990; 1990-1993
(Kuwait)	Kuwait	Sheikh Sabah Al-Ahmad Al-Jaber Al-Sabah	1978-2003
(Laos)	Laos	Phoune Sipraseuth	1975-1993
(Lebanon)	Lebanon	Selim Hoss; Farès Boueiz	1987-1990; 1990-1992
(Malaysia)	Malaysia	Abu Hassan Omar	1987-1991
(Maldives)	Maldives	Fathulla Jameel	1978-2005
(Mongolia)	Mongolia	Tserenpiliin Gombosüren	1988-1996
(Myanmar)	Myanmar	Saw Maung	1988-1991
(Nepal)	Nepal	Shailendra Kumar Upadhyaya; Hari Bahadur Basnet; Pashupati Shamsher Jang Bahadur Rana; Krishna Prasad Bhattarai	1986-1990; 1990; 1990; 1990-1991
(Oman)	Oman	Yusuf bin Alawi bin Abdullah	1982–2020
(Pakistan)	Pakistan	Sahabzada Yaqub Khan	1988-1991
(Philippines)	Philippines	Raul Manglapus	1987-1992
(Qatar)	Qatar	Abdullah ibn Khalifa al-Attiyah; Mubarak Ali al-Khater	1989-1990; 1990-1992
(Saudi Arabia)	Saudi Arabia	Prince Saud bin Faisal bin Abdulaziz Al Saud	1975–2015
(Singapore)	Singapore	Wong Kan Seng	1988-1994
(Sri Lanka)	Sri Lanka	Ranjan Wijeratne; Harold Herath	1989-1990; 1990-1993
(Syria)	Syria	Farouk al-Sharaa	1984-2006
(Taiwan)	Taiwan (Republic of China)	Lien Chan; Fredrick Chien	1988-1990; 1990-1996
(Thailand)	Thailand	Siddhi Savetsila; Subin Pinkayan; Arthit Ourairat	1980-1990; 1990; 1990-1991
(Turkey)	Turkey	Mesut Yılmaz; Ali Bozer; Ahmet Kurtcebe Alptemoçin	1987-1990; 1990; 1990-1991
(United Arab Emirates)	United Arab Emirates	Rashid Abdullah Al Nuaimi	1980-2006
(Vietnam)	Vietnam	Nguyễn Cơ Thạch	1980-1991
(Yemen)	Yemen	Abdul Aziz al-Dali; Abd Al-Karim Al-Iryani	South Yemen, 1982-1990; North Yemen, 1984–1990; unified Yemen 1990-1993

== Australia and Oceania ==
Flag	Country	Foreign minister	Term
(Australia)	Australia	Gareth Evans	1988-1996
(Fiji)	Fiji	Ratu Sir Kamisese Mara	1988-1992
(Kiribati)	Kiribati	Ieremia Tabai	1983-1991
(Marshall Islands)	Marshall Islands	Tom Kijiner	1988-1994
(Federated States of Micronesia)	Micronesia	Andon Amaraich	1979-1991
(Nauru)	Nauru	Bernard Dowiyogo	1989-1995
(New Zealand) (Cook Islands)	New Zealand Cook Islands	Russell Marshall; Mike Moore; Don McKinnon Inatio Akaruru	1987-1990; 1990; 1990-1999 1989-1999
(Papua New Guinea)	Papua New Guinea	Sir Michael Somare	1988-1992
(Solomon Islands)	Solomon Islands	Sir Baddeley Devesi; Sir Peter Kenilorea	1989-1990; 1990-1993
(Tonga)	Tonga	Prince Tupouto'a Tungi	1979-1998
(Tuvalu)	Tuvalu	Bikenibeu Paeniu	1989-1993
(Vanuatu)	Vanuatu	Donald Kalpokas	1987-1991
(Samoa)	Western Samoa	Tofilau Eti Alesana	1988-1998

== Europe ==
Flag	Country	Foreign minister	Term
(Albania)	Albania	Reiz Malile	1982-1991
(Austria)	Austria	Alois Mock	1987-1995
(Belgium) (Brussels) (Wallonia)	Belgium Brussels-Capital Region Wallonia	Mark Eyskens Jos Chabert Albert Liénard	1989-1992 1989-1999 1988-1992
(Bulgaria) (Bulgaria)	Bulgaria	Boiko Dimitrov; Lyuben Gotsev; Viktor Valkov	1989-1990; 1990; 1990-1991
(Cyprus) (Northern Cyprus)	Cyprus Northern Cyprus	Georgios Iacovou Kenan Atakol	1983-1993 1985-1993
(Czechoslovakia)	Czechoslovakia	Jiří Dienstbier	1989-1992
(Denmark)	Denmark	Uffe Ellemann-Jensen	1982-1993
(Finland)	Finland	Pertti Paasio	1989-1991
(France)	France	Roland Dumas	1988-1993
(East Germany)	East Germany	Oskar Fischer; Markus Meckel; Lothar de Maizière	1975-1990; 1990; 1990
(West Germany)	West Germany	Hans-Dietrich Genscher	1982-1992
(Greece)	Greece	Antonis Samaras; Georgios Papoulias; Antonis Samaras	1989-1990; 1990; 1990-1992
(Hungary)	Hungary	Gyula Horn; Géza Jeszenszky	1989-1990; 1990-1994
(Iceland)	Iceland	Jón Baldvin Hannibalsson	1988-1995
(Republic of Ireland)	Ireland	Gerry Collins	1989-1992
(Italy)	Italy	Gianni De Michelis	1989-1992
(Liechtenstein)	Liechtenstein	Hans Brunhart	1978-1993
(Lithuania)	Lithuania	Algirdas Saudargas	1990-1992
(Luxembourg)	Luxembourg	Jacques Poos	1984-1999
(Malta)	Malta	Guido de Marco	1989-1996
(Netherlands)	Netherlands	Hans van den Broek	1982-1993
(Norway)	Norway	Kjell Magne Bondevik; Thorvald Stoltenberg	1989-1990; 1990-1993
(Poland)	Poland	Krzysztof Skubiszewski	1989-1993
(Portugal)	Portugal	João de Deus Pinheiro	1987-1992
(Romania)	Romania	Sergiu Celac; Adrian Năstase	1989-1990; 1990-1992
(San Marino)	San Marino	Gabriele Gatti	1986-2002
(Soviet Union) (Russian Soviet Federative Socialist Republic) (Ukrainian Soviet Socialist Republic) (Byelorussian Soviet Socialist Republic) (Moldavian Soviet Socialist Republic) (Estonian Soviet Socialist Republic) (Latvian Soviet Socialist Republic) (Lithuanian Soviet Socialist Republic) (Georgian Soviet Socialist Republic) (Armenian Soviet Socialist Republic) (Azerbaijan Soviet Socialist Republic) (Kazakh Soviet Socialist Republic) (Uzbek Soviet Socialist Republic) (Turkmen Soviet Socialist Republic) (Tajik Soviet Socialist Republic) (Kirghiz Soviet Socialist Republic)	Soviet Union Russian SFSR Ukrainian SSR Byelorussian SSR Moldavian SSR Estonian SSR Latvian SSR Lithuanian SSR Georgian SSR Armenian SSR Azerbaijan SSR Kazakh SSR Uzbek SSR Turkmen SSR Tajik SSR Kirghiz SSR	Eduard Shevardnadze Andrey Kozyrev Volodymyr Kravets; Anatoliy Zlenko Anatoly Gurinovich; Petr Krauchenka Petru Comendant; Nicolae Țâu Arnold Green; Lennart Meri Leonards Bartkēvičs; Jānis Jurkāns Vladislovas Mikučiauskas; Algirdas Saudargas Giorgi Javakhishvili; Giorgi Khoshtaria Anatoly Mkrtchyan Huseynaga Sadigov Akmaral Arystanbekova Sarvar Azimov Tuvakbibi Amangeldyeva; Awdy Kulyýew Lakim Kayumov Zhanyl Tumenbayeva	1985-1991 1990-1996 1984-1990; 1990-1994 1966-1990; 1990-1994 1981-1990; 1990-1993 1962-1990; 1990-1992 1985-1990; 1990-1994 1988-1990; 1990-1992 1985-1990; 1990-1991 1986-1991 1988-1992 1989-1991 1988-1991 1988-1990; 1990-1992 1989-1992 1989-1991
(Spain)	Spain	Francisco Fernández Ordóñez	1985-1992
(Sweden)	Sweden	Sten Andersson	1985-1991
(Switzerland)	Switzerland	René Felber	1988-1993
(United Kingdom)	United Kingdom	Douglas Hurd	1989-1995
(Vatican City)	Vatican City	Archbishop Angelo Sodano; Archbishop Jean-Louis Tauran	1988-1990; 1990-2003
(Socialist Federal Republic of Yugoslavia) (Socialist Republic of Bosnia and Herzegovina) (Socialist Republic of Croatia) (Socialist Republic of Montenegro) (Socialist Republic of Serbia) (Socialist Republic of Slovenia)	Yugoslavia Bosnia and Herzegovina Croatia Montenegro Serbia Slovenia	Budimir Lončar Haris Silajdžić Zdravko Mršić; Frane Vinko Golem Igor Jovović; Branko Lukovac Aleksandar Prlja Dimitrij Rupel	1987-1991 1990-1993 1990; 1990-1991 1985-1990; 1990-1991 1989-1991 1990-1993

== North America and the Caribbean ==
Flag	Country	Foreign minister	Term
(Antigua and Barbuda)	Antigua and Barbuda	Lester Bird	1982-1991
(The Bahamas)	The Bahamas	Clement T. Maynard	1984-1992
(Barbados)	Barbados	Maurice King	1989-1993
(Belize)	Belize	Said Musa	1989-1993
(Canada) (Quebec)	Canada Quebec	Joe Clark John Ciaccia	1984-1991 1989-1994
(Costa Rica)	Costa Rica	Rodrigo Madrigal Nieto; Bernd H. Niehaus Quesada	1986-1990; 1990-1994
(Cuba)	Cuba	Isidoro Malmierca Peoli	1976-1992
(Dominica)	Dominica	Eugenia Charles; Brian George Keith Alleyne	1980-1990; 1990-1995
(Dominican Republic)	Dominican Republic	Joaquín Ricardo García	1988-1991
(El Salvador)	El Salvador	José Manuel Pacas Castro	1989-1994
(Grenada)	Grenada	Ben Jones; Nicholas Brathwaite; Ben Jones	1984-1990; 1990; 1990-1991
(Guatemala)	Guatemala	Ariel Rivera Irias	1989-1991
(Haiti)	Haiti	Yvon Perrier; Kesler Clermont; Alex Toussaint; Paul Christian Latortue	1989-1990; 1990; 1990; 1990-1991
(Honduras)	Honduras	Carlos López Contreras; Mario Carías Zapata	1986-1990; 1990-1994
(Jamaica)	Jamaica	David Coore	1989-1993
(Mexico)	Mexico	Fernando Solana	1988-1993
(Nicaragua)	Nicaragua	Miguel d'Escoto Brockmann; Enrique Dreyfus	1979-1990; 1990-1992
(Panama)	Panama	Julio Linares	1989-1993
(Puerto Rico)	Puerto Rico	Sila M. Calderon; Antonio Colorado	1988–1990; 1990–1992
(Saint Kitts and Nevis)	Saint Kitts and Nevis	Kennedy Simmonds	1983-1995
(Saint Lucia)	Saint Lucia	Neville Cenac	1987-1992
(Saint Vincent and the Grenadines)	Saint Vincent and the Grenadines	James Fitz-Allen Mitchell	1984-1992
(Trinidad and Tobago)	Trinidad and Tobago	Sahadeo Basdeo	1988-1991
(United States)	United States	James Baker	1989-1992

== South America ==
Flag	Country	Foreign minister	Term
(Argentina)	Argentina	Domingo Cavallo	1989-1991
(Bolivia)	Bolivia	Carlos Iturralde Ballivián	1989-1992
(Brazil)	Brazil	Roberto Costa de Abreu Sodré; Francisco Rezek	1986-1990; 1990-1992
(Chile)	Chile	Hernán Felipe Errázuriz; Enrique Silva Cimma	1988-1990; 1990-1994
(Colombia)	Colombia	Julio Londoño Paredes; Luis Fernando Jaramillo Correa	1986-1990; 1990-1991
(Ecuador)	Ecuador	Diego Cordovez Zegers	1988-1992
(Guyana)	Guyana	Rashleigh E. Jackson; Desmond Hoyte	1978-1990; 1990-1992
(Paraguay) (Paraguay)	Paraguay	Luis María Argaña; Alexis Frutos Vaesken	1989-1990; 1990-1993
(Peru)	Peru	Guillermo Larco Cox; Luis Marchand Stens	1989-1990; 1990-1991
(Suriname)	Suriname	E.J. Sedoc	1988-1990
(Uruguay)	Uruguay	Luis Barrios Tassano; Héctor Gros Espiell	1988-1990; 1990-1993
(Venezuela)	Venezuela	Reinaldo Figueredo	1989-1992
