= List of foreign ministers in 2011 =

List of foreign ministers

This is a list of foreign ministers in 2011.

== Africa ==
- Algeria - Mourad Medelci (2007–2013)
- Angola - Georges Rebelo Chicoti (2010–2017)
- Benin -
  1. Jean-Marie Ehouzou (2008–2011)
  2. Nassirou Bako Arifari (2011–2015)
- Botswana - Phandu Skelemani (2008–2014)
- Burkina Faso -
  1. Alain Bédouma Yoda (2008–2011)
  2. Djibril Bassolé (2011–2014)
- Burundi -
  1. Augustin Nsanze (2009–2011)
  2. Laurent Kavakure (2011–2015)
- Cameroon -
  1. Henri Eyebe Ayissi (2007–2011)
  2. Pierre Moukoko Mbonjo (2011–2015)
- Cape Verde -
  1. José Brito (2008–2011)
  2. Jorge Borges (2011–2014)
- Central African Republic - Antoine Gambi (2009–2013)
- Chad - Moussa Faki (2008–2017)
- Comoros -
  1. Fahmi Said Ibrahim El Maceli (2010–2011)
  2. Mohamed Bakri Ben Abdoulfatah Charif (2011–2013)
- Republic of Congo - Basile Ikouébé (2007–2015)
- Democratic Republic of Congo - Alexis Thambwe Mwamba (2008–2012)
- Côte d'Ivoire -
  1. Alcide Djédjé (2010–2011) (Gbagbo government)
  2. Jean-Marie Kacou Gervais (2010–2011) (Ouattara government)
  3. Daniel Kablan Duncan (2011–2012)
- Djibouti - Mahamoud Ali Youssouf (2005–present)
- Egypt -
  1. Ahmed Aboul Gheit (2004–2011)
  2. Nabil Elaraby (2011)
  3. Mohamed Orabi (2011)
  4. Mohamed Kamel Amr (2011–2013)
- Equatorial Guinea - Pastor Micha Ondó Bile (2003–2012)
- Eritrea - Osman Saleh Mohammed (2007–present)
- Ethiopia - Hailemariam Desalegn (2010–2012)
- Gabon - Paul Toungui (2008–2012)
- The Gambia - Mamadou Tangara (2010–2012)
- Ghana - Muhammad Mumuni (2009–2013)
- Guinea - Edouard Niankoye Lamah (2010–2012)
- Guinea-Bissau -
  1. Adelino Mano Quetá (2009–2011)
  2. Mamadu Saliu Djaló Pires (2011–2012)
- Kenya -
  - Moses Wetangula (2008–2012)
  - George Saitoti (acting) (2010–2011)
- Lesotho - Mohlabi Tsekoa (2007–2015)
- Liberia - Toga McIntosh (2010–2012)
- Libya -
  1. Moussa Koussa (2009–2011)
  2. Abdul Ati al-Obeidi (2011)
  3. Ali Abd-al-Aziz al-Isawi (2011)
  4. Mahmoud Jibril (2011)
  5. Ashour Bin Khayal (2011–2012)
- Madagascar -
  1. Hyppolite Ramaroson (2010–2011)
  2. Yvette Sylla (2011)
  3. Pierrot Rajaonarivelo (2011–2013)
- Malawi -
  1. Etta Banda (2009–2011)
  2. Bingu wa Mutharika (2011)
  3. Peter Mutharika (2011–2012)
- Mali -
  1. Moctar Ouane (2004–2011)
  2. Soumeylou Boubèye Maïga (2011–2013)
- Mauritania -
  1. Naha Mint Mouknass (2009–2011)
  2. Hamadi Ould Baba Ould Hamadi (2011–2013)
- Mauritius - Arvin Boolell (2008–2014)
- Morocco - Taieb Fassi Fihri (2007–2012)
  - Western Sahara - Mohamed Salem Ould Salek (1998–2023)
- Mozambique - Oldemiro Balói (2008–2017)
- Namibia - Utoni Nujoma (2010–2012)
- Niger -
  1. Aminatou Maïga Touré (2010–2011)
  2. Mohamed Bazoum (2011–2015)
- Nigeria -
  1. Henry Odein Ajumogobia (2010–2011)
  2. Olugbenga Ashiru (2011–2013)
- Rwanda - Louise Mushikiwabo (2009–2018)
- São Tomé and Príncipe - Manuel Salvador dos Ramos (2010–2012)
- Senegal - Madické Niang (2009–2012)
- Seychelles - Jean-Paul Adam (2010–2015)
- Sierra Leone - J. B. Dauda (2010–2012)
- Somalia - Mohamed Abdullahi Omaar (2010–2012)
  - Somaliland - Abdillahi Mohamed Omer (2010–2013)
  - Puntland - Daud Mohamed Omar (2010–2014)
- South Africa - Maite Nkoana-Mashabane (2009–2018)
- South Sudan -
  1. Deng Alor (2011)
  2. Nhial Deng Nhial (2011–2013)
- Sudan - Ali Karti (2010–2015)
- Swaziland -
  1. Lutfo Dlamini (2008–2011)
  2. Mtiti Fakudze (2011–2013)
- Tanzania – Bernard Membe (2007–2015)
- Togo - Elliott Ohin (2010–2013)
- Tunisia -
  1. Kamel Morjane (2010–2011)
  2. Ahmed Ounaies (2011)
  3. Mouldi Kefi (2011)
  4. Rafik Abdessalem (2011–2013)
- Uganda -
  - Sam Kutesa (2005–2021)
  - Henry Oryem Okello (acting) (2011–2012)
- Zambia -
  1. Kabinga Pande (2007–2011)
  2. Chishimba Kambwili (2011–2012)
- Zimbabwe - Simbarashe Mumbengegwi (2005–present)

== Asia ==
- Afghanistan - Zalmai Rassoul (2010–2013)
- Armenia - Eduard Nalbandyan (2008–2018)
- Azerbaijan - Elmar Mammadyarov (2004–2020)
  - Nagorno-Karabakh -
    1. Georgy Petrosyan (2005–2011)
    2. Vasily Atajanyan (acting) (2011–2012)
- Bahrain - Sheikh Khalid ibn Ahmad Al Khalifah (2005–2020)
- Bangladesh – Dipu Moni (2009–2013)
- Bhutan - Ugyen Tshering (2008–2013)
- Brunei - Pengiran Muda Mohamed Bolkiah (1984–2015)
- Cambodia - Hor Namhong (1998–2016)
- China - Yang Jiechi (2007–2013)
- East Timor - Zacarias da Costa (2007–2012)
- Georgia - Grigol Vashadze (2008–2012)
  - Abkhazia -
    1. Maxim Gvinjia (2010–2011)
    2. Viacheslav Chirikba (2011–2016)
  - South Ossetia - Murat Dzhioyev (1998–2012)
- India - S. M. Krishna (2009–2012)
- Indonesia - Marty Natalegawa (2009–2014)
- Iran - Ali Akbar Salehi (2010–2013)
- Iraq - Hoshyar Zebari (2003–2014)
  - Kurdistan - Falah Mustafa Bakir (2006–2019)
- Israel - Avigdor Lieberman (2009–2012)
  - Palestinian Authority -Riyad al-Maliki (2007–present)
    - Gaza Strip (in rebellion against the Palestinian National Authority) - Muhammad Awad (2011–2012)
- Japan -
  1. Seiji Maehara (2010–2011)
  2. Yukio Edano (acting) (2011)
  3. Takeaki Matsumoto (2011)
  4. Kōichirō Gemba (2011–2012)
- Jordan - Nasser Judeh (2009–2017)
- Kazakhstan –
  1. Kanat Saudabayev (2009–2011)
  2. Yerzhan Kazykhanov (2011–2012)
- North Korea - Pak Ui-chun (2007–2014)
- South Korea - Kim Sung-hwan (2010–2013)
- Kuwait -
  1. Sheikh Mohammad Sabah Al-Salem Al-Sabah (2003–2011)
  2. Ali al-Rashed (acting) (2011)
  3. Sheikh Sabah Al-Khalid Al-Sabah (2011–2019)
- Kyrgyzstan - Ruslan Kazakbayev (2010–2012)
- Laos - Thongloun Sisoulith (2006–2016)
- Lebanon -
  1. Ali Al Shami (2009–2011)
  2. Adnan Mansour (2011–2014)
- Malaysia - Anifah Aman (2009–2018)
- Maldives -
  1. Ahmed Shaheed (2008–2011)
  2. Ahmed Naseem (2011–2012)
- Mongolia - Gombojavyn Zandanshatar (2009–2012)
- Myanmar -
  1. Nyan Win (2004–2011)
  2. Wunna Maung Lwin (2011–2016)
- Nepal -
  1. Sujata Koirala (2009–2011)
  2. Narayan Kaji Shrestha (2011–2013)
- Oman - Yusuf bin Alawi bin Abdullah (1982–2020)
- Pakistan -
  1. Shah Mehmood Qureshi (2008–2011)
  2. Hina Rabbani Khar (2011–2013)
- Philippines -
  1. Alberto Romulo (2004–2011)
  2. Albert del Rosario (2011–2016)
- Qatar - Sheikh Hamad bin Jassim bin Jaber Al Thani (1992–2013)
- Saudi Arabia - Prince Saud bin Faisal bin Abdulaziz Al Saud (1975–2015)
- Singapore -
  1. George Yeo (2004–2011)
  2. K. Shanmugam (2011–2015)
- Sri Lanka - G. L. Peiris (2010–2015)
- Syria - Walid Muallem (2006–2020)
- Taiwan - Timothy Yang (2009–2012)
- Tajikistan - Khamrokhon Zaripov (2006–2013)
- Thailand -
  1. Kasit Piromya (2008–2011)
  2. Surapong Tovichakchaikul (2011–2014)
- Turkey - Ahmet Davutoğlu (2009–2014)
- Turkmenistan - Raşit Meredow (2001–present)
- United Arab Emirates - Sheikh Abdullah bin Zayed Al Nahyan (2006–present)
- Uzbekistan - Elyor Ganiyev (2010–2012)
- Vietnam -
  1. Phạm Gia Khiêm (2006–2011)
  2. Phạm Bình Minh (2011–2021)
- Yemen - Abu Bakr al-Qirbi (2001–2014)

== Europe ==
- Albania - Edmond Haxhinasto (2010–2012)
- Andorra -
  1. Xavier Espot Miró (2009–2011)
  2. Gilbert Saboya Sunyé (2011–2017)
- Austria - Michael Spindelegger (2008–2013)
- Belarus - Sergei Martynov (2003–2012)
- Belgium -
  1. Steven Vanackere (2009–2011)
  2. Didier Reynders (2011–2019)
  - Brussels-Capital Region - Jean-Luc Vanraes (2009–2013)
  - Flanders - Kris Peeters (2008–2014)
  - Wallonia - Rudy Demotte (2009–2014)
- Bosnia and Herzegovina - Sven Alkalaj (2007–2012)
- Bulgaria - Nickolay Mladenov (2010–2013)
- Croatia -
  1. Gordan Jandroković (2008–2011)
  2. Vesna Pusić (2011–2016)
- Cyprus -
  1. Markos Kyprianou (2008–2011)
  2. Erato Kozakou-Marcoullis (2011–2013)
  - Northern Cyprus - Hüseyin Özgürgün (2009–2013)
- Czech Republic - Karel Schwarzenberg (2010–2013)
- Denmark -
  1. Lene Espersen (2010–2011)
  2. Villy Søvndal (2011–2013)
  - Greenland - Kuupik Kleist (2009–2013)
  - Faroe Islands -
    1. Jørgen Niclasen (2008–2011)
    2. Kaj Leo Johannesen (2011–2015)
- Estonia - Urmas Paet (2005–2014)
- Finland -
  1. Alexander Stubb (2008–2011)
  2. Erkki Tuomioja (2011–2015)
- France -
  1. Michèle Alliot-Marie (2010–2011)
  2. Alain Juppé (2011–2012)
- Germany - Guido Westerwelle (2009–2013)
- Greece -
  1. Dimitrios Droutsas (2010–2011)
  2. Stavros Lambrinidis (2011)
  3. Stavros Dimas (2011–2012)
- Hungary - János Martonyi (2010–2014)
- Iceland - Össur Skarphéðinsson (2009–2013)
- Ireland -
  1. Micheál Martin (2008–2011)
  2. Brian Cowen (2011)
  3. Eamon Gilmore (2011–2014)
- Italy -
  1. Franco Frattini (2008–2011)
  2. Giulio Terzi di Sant'Agata (2011–2013)
- Latvia -
  1. Ģirts Valdis Kristovskis (2010–2011)
  2. Edgars Rinkēvičs (2011–2023)
- Liechtenstein - Aurelia Frick (2009–2019)
- Lithuania - Audronius Ažubalis (2010–2012)
- Luxembourg - Jean Asselborn (2004–present)
- Republic of Macedonia -
  1. Antonio Milošoski (2006–2011)
  2. Nikola Poposki (2011–2017)
- Malta - Tonio Borg (2008–2012)
- Moldova - Iurie Leancă (2009–2013)
  - Transnistria - Vladimir Yastrebchak (2008–2012)
- Monaco -
  1. Franck Biancheri (2008–2011)
  2. José Badia (2011–2015)
- Montenegro - Milan Roćen (2006–2012)
- Netherlands - Uri Rosenthal (2010–2012)
- Norway - Jonas Gahr Støre (2005–2012)
- Poland - Radosław Sikorski (2007–2014)
- Portugal -
  1. Luís Amado (2006–2011)
  2. Paulo Portas (2011–2013)
- Romania - Teodor Baconschi (2009–2012)
- Russia - Sergey Lavrov (2004–present)
- San Marino - Antonella Mularoni (2008–2012)
- Serbia - Vuk Jeremić (2007–2012)
  - Kosovo -
    1. Vlora Çitaku (acting) (2010–2011)
    2. Enver Hoxhaj (2011–2014)
- Slovakia - Mikuláš Dzurinda (2010–2012)
- Slovenia - Samuel Žbogar (2008–2012)
- Spain -
  1. Trinidad Jiménez (2010–2011)
  2. José Manuel García-Margallo (2011–2016)
- Sweden - Carl Bildt (2006–2014)
- Switzerland - Micheline Calmy-Rey (2003–2011)
- Ukraine - Kostyantyn Gryshchenko (2010–2012)
- United Kingdom - William Hague (2010–2014)
  - Scotland - Fiona Hyslop (2009–2020)
- Vatican City - Archbishop Dominique Mamberti (2006–2014)

== North America and the Caribbean ==
- Antigua and Barbuda - Baldwin Spencer (2005–2014)
- The Bahamas - Brent Symonette (2007–2012)
- Barbados - Maxine McClean (2008-2018)
- Belize - Wilfred Elrington (2008–2020)
- Canada -
  1. Lawrence Cannon (2008–2011)
  2. John Baird (2011–2015)
  - Quebec - Monique Gagnon-Tremblay (2010–2012)
- Costa Rica -
  1. René Castro (2010–2011)
  2. Carlos Roverssi (acting) (2011)
  3. Enrique Castillo (2011–2014)
- Cuba - Bruno Rodríguez Parrilla (2009–present)
- Dominica - Roosevelt Skerrit (2010–2014)
- Dominican Republic - Carlos Morales Troncoso (2004–2014)
- El Salvador - Hugo Martínez (2009–2013)
- Grenada - Karl Hood (2010–2012)
- Guatemala - Haroldo Rodas (2008–2012)
- Haiti -
  1. Marie-Michèle Rey (2009–2011)
  2. Laurent Lamothe (2011–2012)
- Honduras -
  1. Mario Canahuati (2010–2011)
  2. Arturo Corrales (2011–2013)
- Jamaica - Kenneth Baugh (2007–2012)
- Mexico - Patricia Espinosa (2006–2012)
- Nicaragua - Samuel Santos López (2007–2017)
- Panama -
  1. Juan Carlos Varela (2009–2011)
  2. Roberto Henríquez (2011–2012)
- Puerto Rico – Kenneth McClintock (2009–2013)
- Saint Kitts and Nevis - Sam Condor (2010–2013)
- Saint Lucia -
  1. Rufus Bousquet (2009–2011)
  2. Alva Baptiste (2011–2016)
- Saint Vincent and the Grenadines - Douglas Slater (2010–2013)
- Trinidad and Tobago - Surujrattan Rambachan (2010–2012)
- United States of America - Hillary Clinton (2009–2013)

== Oceania ==
- Australia - Kevin Rudd (2010–2012)
- Fiji - Ratu Inoke Kubuabola (2009–2016)
- French Polynesia -
  1. Gaston Tong Sang (2009–2011)
  2. Oscar Temaru (2011–2013)
- Kiribati - Anote Tong (2003–2016)
- Marshall Islands - John Silk (2009–2012)
- Micronesia - Lorin S. Robert (2007–2019)
- Nauru -
  1. Kieren Keke (2007–2011)
  2. Mathew Batsiua (2011)
  3. Sprent Dabwido (2011–2012)
- New Zealand - Murray McCully (2008–2017)
  - Cook Islands - Tom Marsters (2010–2013)
  - Niue - Toke Talagi (2008–2020)
  - Tokelau -
    1. Kuresa Nasau (2010–2011)
    2. Foua Toloa (2011–2012)
- Palau - Victor Yano (2010–2013)
- Papua New Guinea -
  1. Don Polye (2010–2011)
  2. Ano Pala (2011–2012)/Paru Aihi (2011–2012) (rival Somare government)
- Samoa - Tuilaepa Aiono Sailele Malielegaoi (1998–2021)
- Solomon Islands - Peter Shanel Agovaka (2010–2012)
- Tonga - Sialeʻataongo Tuʻivakanō (2010–2014)
- Tuvalu - Apisai Ielemia (2010–2013)
- Vanuatu -
  1. George Wells (2010–2011)
  2. Joe Natuman (2011)
  3. George Wells (2011)
  4. Alfred Carlot (2011)
  5. Joe Natuman (2011)
  6. Alfred Carlot (2011–2013)

== South America ==
- Argentina - Héctor Timerman (2010–2015)
- Bolivia - David Choquehuanca (2006–2017)
- Brazil -
  1. Celso Amorim (2003–2011)
  2. Antonio Patriota (2011–2013)
- Chile - Alfredo Moreno Charme (2010–2014)
- Colombia - María Ángela Holguín (2010–2018)
- Ecuador - Ricardo Patiño (2010–2016)
- Guyana - Carolyn Rodrigues (2008–2015)
- Paraguay -
  1. Héctor Lacognata (2009–2011)
  2. Jorge Lara Castro (2011–2012)
- Peru -
  1. José Antonio García Belaúnde (2006–2011)
  2. Rafael Roncagliolo (2011–2013)
- Suriname - Winston Lackin (2010–2015)
- Uruguay - Luis Almagro (2010–2015)
- Venezuela - Nicolás Maduro (2006–2013)
