= Mohamed Ould Tolba =

Mauritanian politician (born 1962)

Mohamed Ould Tolba (born 1962) was the Minister of Foreign Affairs and Cooperation of Mauritania from 2002 to 2003.

Ould Tolba was born in R'Kiz, in Trarza Region. He attended secondary school from 1974 to 1980 in Boutilimitt and Nouakchott, and he subsequently studied at the Ecole Normale Supérieure. He was a secondary school teacher from 1984 to 1987 and worked at the Ministry of National Education from 1987 to 2002, being named Secretary-General of that ministry in March 2002. He was then appointed Minister of Foreign Affairs and Cooperation on October 27, 2002.
