= Askar Aitmatov =

Kyrgyz politician (born 1959)

Askar Chingizovich Aitmatov (born January 5, 1959, in Frunze, Kirghiz SSR, Soviet Union) served as Foreign Minister in the Government of Kyrgyzstan from June 2002 to March 2005. He is the son of the late Kyrgyz writer Chinghiz Aitmatov. Graduated from the Institute of Asian and African Countries at Moscow State University (1981) with a degree in Oriental History. Fluent in English, Turkish, French.
