= Naira Melkumian =

Armenian politician (born 1953)

Naira Rafaeli Melkumian (Armenian: Նաիրա Ռաֆայելի Մելքումյան; born 7 November 1953) was the Foreign Minister of the Nagorno Karabakh Republic (NKR) from 1997 until 2002.
