= Keith Desmond Knight =

Jamaican lawyer and politician

The Honourable K. D. Knight OJ KC
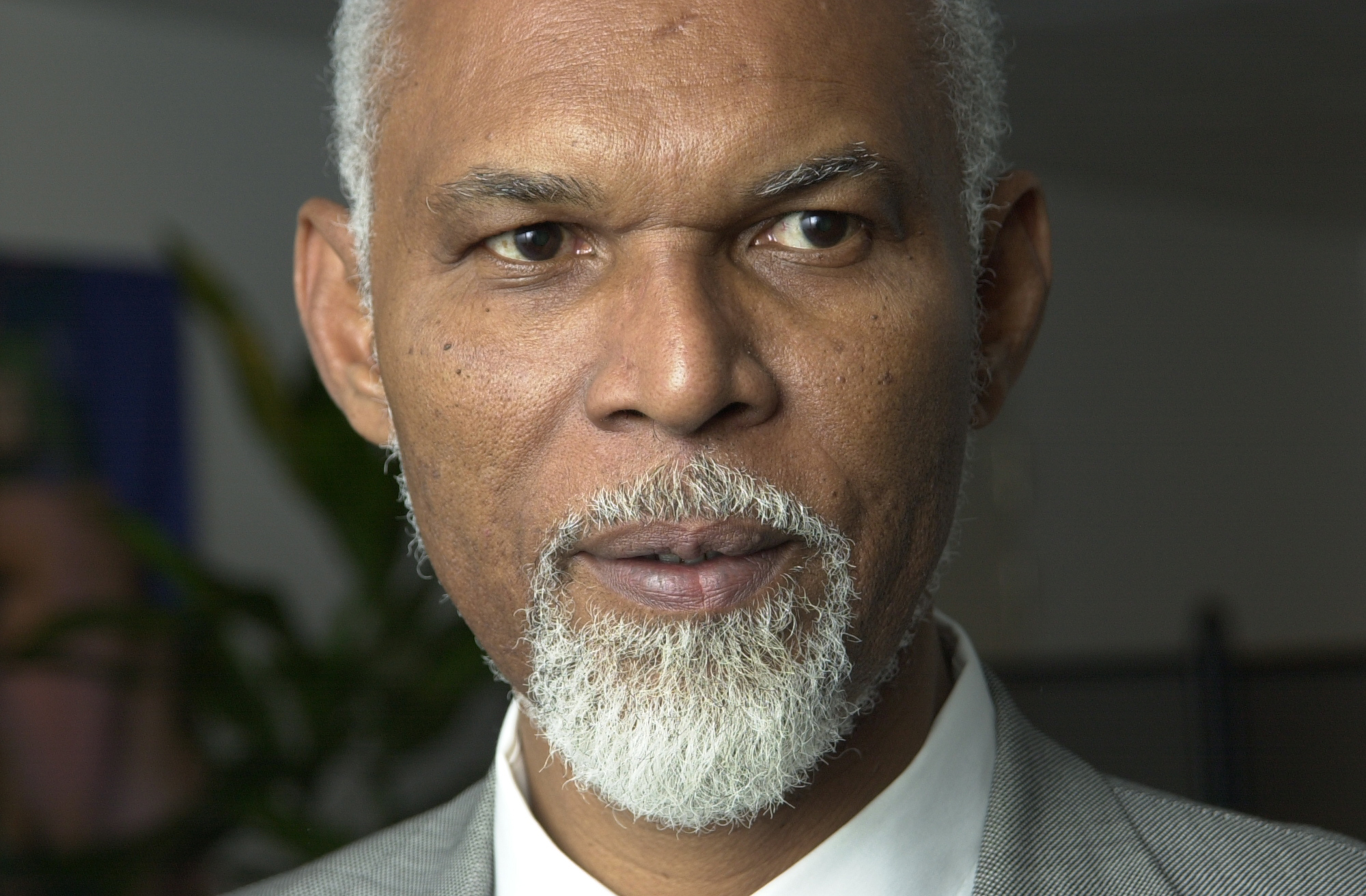

Minister of Justice
- In office 1992–2001
- Preceded by: Errol Anderson
- Succeeded by: Arnold J. Nicholson

Minister of Foreign Affairs and Foreign Trade
- In office 2001–2006
- Preceded by: Paul Robertson
- Succeeded by: Anthony Hylton

Member of Parliament for Saint Andrew North Eastern
- In office 1989–2007

Personal details
- Born: Keith Desmond St. Aubyn Knight; May 24, 1941 (age 84)
- Party: People's National Party

Keith Desmond St. Aubyn Knight (born 24 May 1941) is a Jamaican lawyer and politician who served as Minister of Justice from 1992 to 2001 and Minister of Foreign Affairs and Trade from 2001 to 2006.

In 2014, he was awarded the Order of Jamaica (OJ) for his contributions to the country.

His wife, Pauline, a former director at the Planning Institute of Jamaica (PIOJ), died in August 2021.

In August 2025, Knight threatened, and subsequently filed, a defamation lawsuit against Health Minister Dr. Christopher Tufton and the Jamaica Labour Party (JLP). The suit concerns a "manipulated recording" played at a JLP rally that Knight alleges falsely suggested he had no confidence in People's National Party (PNP) President Mark Golding.

He previously served as Member of Parliament for Saint Andrew North Eastern in 1989 until retiring in 2007.
