= Branko Lukovac =

Montenegrin politician (1944 – 2023)

Branko Lukovac (5 January 1944 – 23 June 2023) was a Montenegrin politician who served as Minister of Foreign Affairs from 2000 to 2003. He died on 23 June 2023, at the age of 79.
