= Roberto Flores Bermúdez =

Honduran diplomat and politician

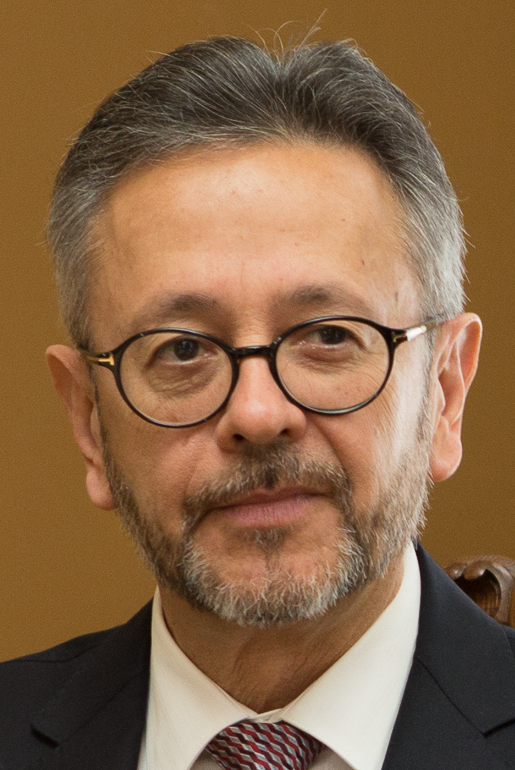
Portrait of Roberto Flores Bermúdez

Roberto Flores Bermúdez is a Honduran diplomat and politician, and the current Foreign Minister in Roberto Micheletti's interim government. He was previously the Foreign Minister in 1992 - 2002, and has twice been Honduras' Ambassador to the United States.

A career diplomat since 1976, he has been posted to a variety of locations, and has twice been Honduras' Ambassador to the United States.

In July 2009, he replaced Enrique Ortez as Foreign Minister in Roberto Micheletti's interim government after Ortez insulted US President Barack Obama.
