= Monie Captan =

Liberian politician

Monie Ralph Captan (born May 28, 1962) is the former foreign minister of Liberia from 1996 until 2003. During most of that time he served under President Charles Taylor. Captan's mother was a native of Liberia and his father had Lebanese roots. Before serving as foreign minister, he was a local businessman, owner of an independent Liberian newspaper and a professor at the University of Liberia. During the Liberian Civil War, his newspaper expressed views which sometimes came across as being sympathetic to Charles Taylor and his National Patriot Front of Liberia (NPFL). When Taylor won the elections, he was subsequently named foreign minister. He is one of several Liberian elites who were not members of Taylor's NPFL to be appointed to high level positions. During the Liberian Civil war he resided in Monrovia which was never controlled by the NPFL. Currently, Executive Chairman Comium Liberia, Captan was overwhelmingly elected with over 70% of the votes on March 16, 2010 as President of the Liberia Chamber of Commerce.
