= Mustafa Osman Ismail =

Sudanese politician

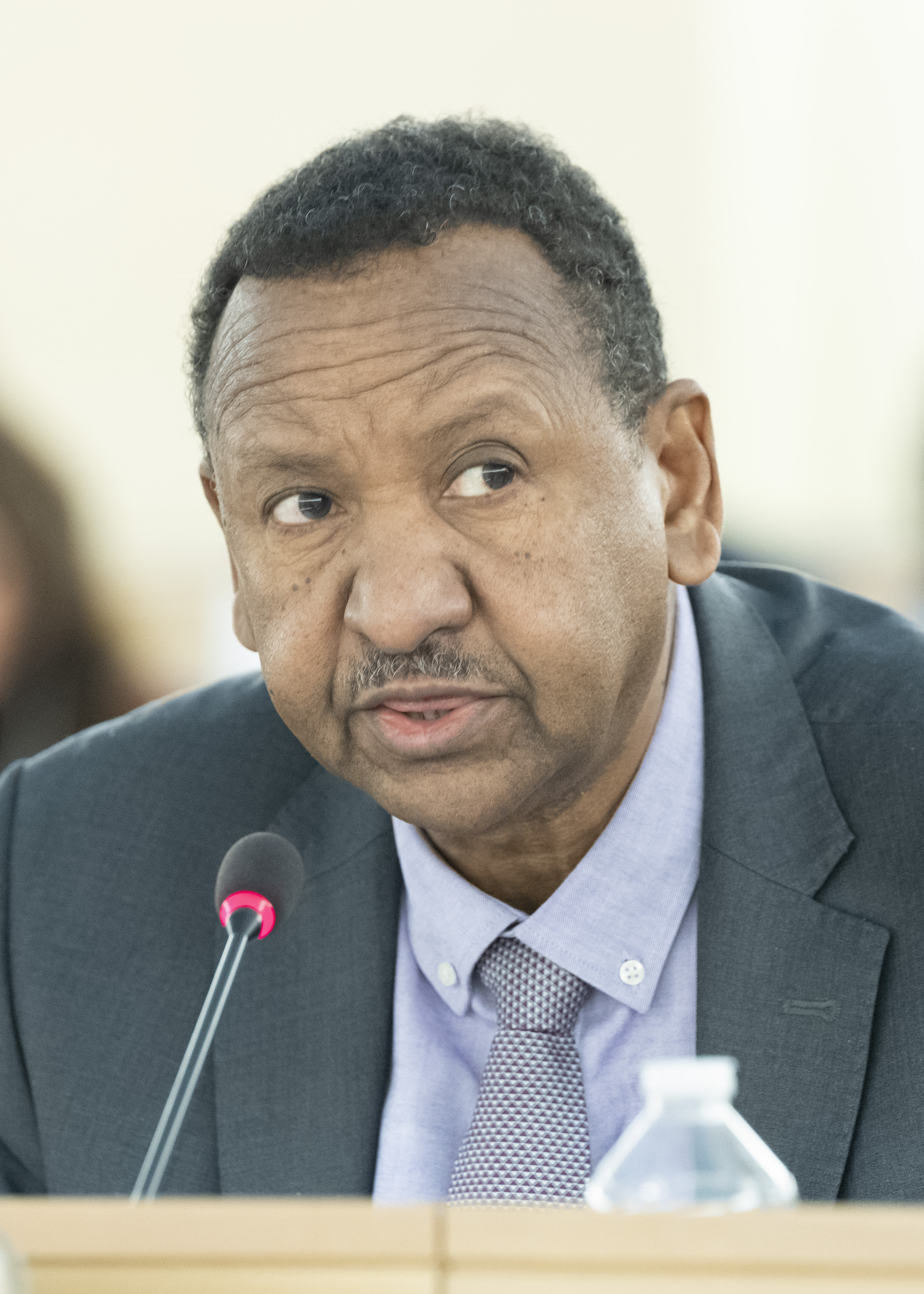
Mustafa Osman Ismail

Mustafa Osman Ismail (born 1955 in Dongola, Sudan) was the head of the National Congress Party, the ruling party in Sudan. Ismail was the Foreign Minister of Sudan from 18 February 1998 to 18 September 2005.

His main job as foreign minister was to be the government's main spokesman in diplomatic efforts to solve the Sudanese civil wars. He was the longest-serving foreign minister in Sudanese history. He was replaced by southerner Lam Akol when the national unity government took office. Ismail was appointed Presidential Advisor after stepping down as Foreign Minister. He has been on many official trips abroad and has been criticized as being an active shadow Foreign Minister for the National Congress Party. His tireless efforts at unsuccessfully mediating crises outside of Sudan, roles in the domestic politics of the National Congress Party and his long tenure in public office have drawn the criticism of sections of the Sudanese media.

| Preceded by Ali Osman Taha | Foreign Minister of Republic of Sudan; January 20, 1996 – January 20, 2005 | Succeeded by Lam Akol |
