= María Eugenia Brizuela de Ávila =

Salvadoran lawyer

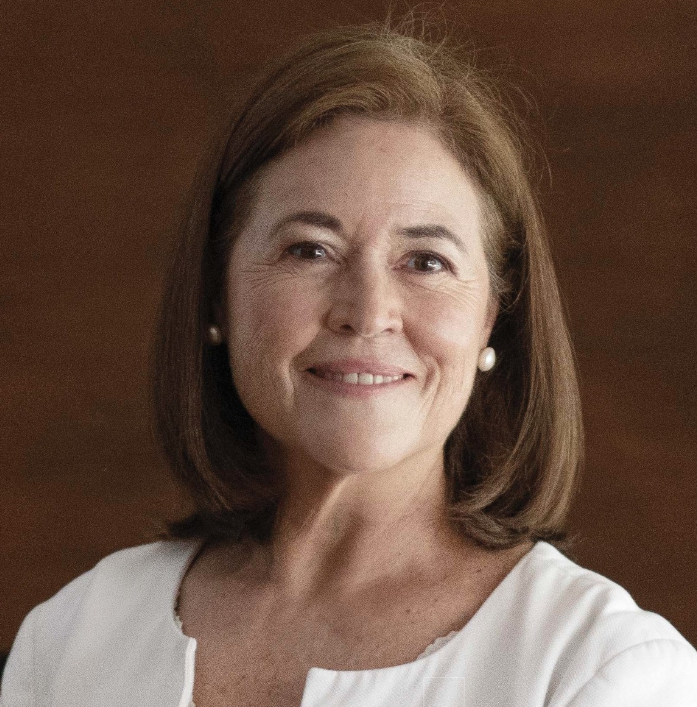
- Education: Master degree in business administration, INCAE Business School and Sustainable Business from the University of Cambridge
- Occupation: Lawyer
- Known for: First woman President of an Insurance Company; First woman President of a private bank

María Eugenia Brizuela de Ávila (née Brizuela Boillat; born 31 October 1956) is a Salvadoran lawyer who served as Minister of Foreign Affairs for the country from 1999 to 2004. She worked as a Director of Corporate Sustainability at HSBC for Latin America and is based in Mexico City.

== Early life ==
Her initial years were with family businesses, La Auxiliadora Funeral Home, coffee plantation, salt production. Founded Internacional de Seguros in 1997, becoming the first woman President of an Insurance Company. In June 1999 became the first woman Minister of Foreign Affairs in El Salvador, serving 5 years till June 2004. August 2004 elected first woman President of a private bank keeping this position when HSBC acquired a controlling majority in 2006. In 2007 pioneered a new function in Latin America region Corporate Sustainability Head till 2015. Currently Executive Coach certified by Success Unlimited Network (SUN) and (Spanish: Instituto Centroamericano de Administración de Empresas) INCAE.

== Academic Background ==
In 1975, she completed her secondary studies at the American School of El Salvador. She then attended the Insurance (Swiss Insurance Institute Zurich) and Law (Universidad DJMD), with a master degree in business administration, MBA, INCAE Business School and Postgraduate in Sustainable Business from the University of Cambridge.

== Career ==
Brizuela worked at the Salvadoran Social Security Institute in 1994 and in 1995 she became the manager of the Fund of Social Investment. She worked as an insurance executive, becoming the first woman in El Salvador to serve as president of an insurance company, Internacional de Seguros (International Insurance) where she worked from 1996 to 1999. In 1999, she was appointed the Minister of Foreign Affairs and was the first woman to head the Ministry. In 2000 the first Hemispheric Ministerial Meeting on the Advancement of Women was held by the Inter-American Commission of Women. Brizuela, and delegates from 32 other countries of the Americas attended to create and adopt the women's strategy for the 21st century. She remained in the government service until 2004, when she left to take a position as president of Banco Salvadoreño (Salvadoran Bank), becoming first Salvadoran woman to lead a private bank. In 2006, she received the Distinguished Professional of the Year Award from her alma mater, José Matías Delgado University.

She joined HSBC in 2006 as an Executive President and moved up to regional director in 2007. That same year, she earned the Palme d'Or, the most significant award given from the Salvadoran Chamber of Commerce and Industry. In 2008, she became the Director of Corporate Sustainability at HSBC for Latin America and relocated to Mexico City. She oversees sustainable development projects like a climate initiative in Brazil and a tree-planting project in Costa Rica. In 2009 Brizuela was inducted into the American School Hall of Fame and received the Most Distinguished Graduate award from INCAE. In 2010 was the first woman ever appointed to the board of INCAE.

== Personal life ==
Brizuela’s maternal grandfather, Juan Boillat, was a Swiss immigrant from the Canton of Jura. She holds dual Salvadoran and Swiss nationality, the latter of which she obtained through her Swiss ancestry. She is married to an engineer and they have three children.

== Honors and recognition ==
- Distinguished Partner 1990 El Salvador Bar Association
- American School Hall of Fame, 2009
- Honorary Member of FUSADES, 2019
- Palma de Oro Chamber of Commerce and Industry, 2007
