= Marcel Ranjeva =

Malagasy politician

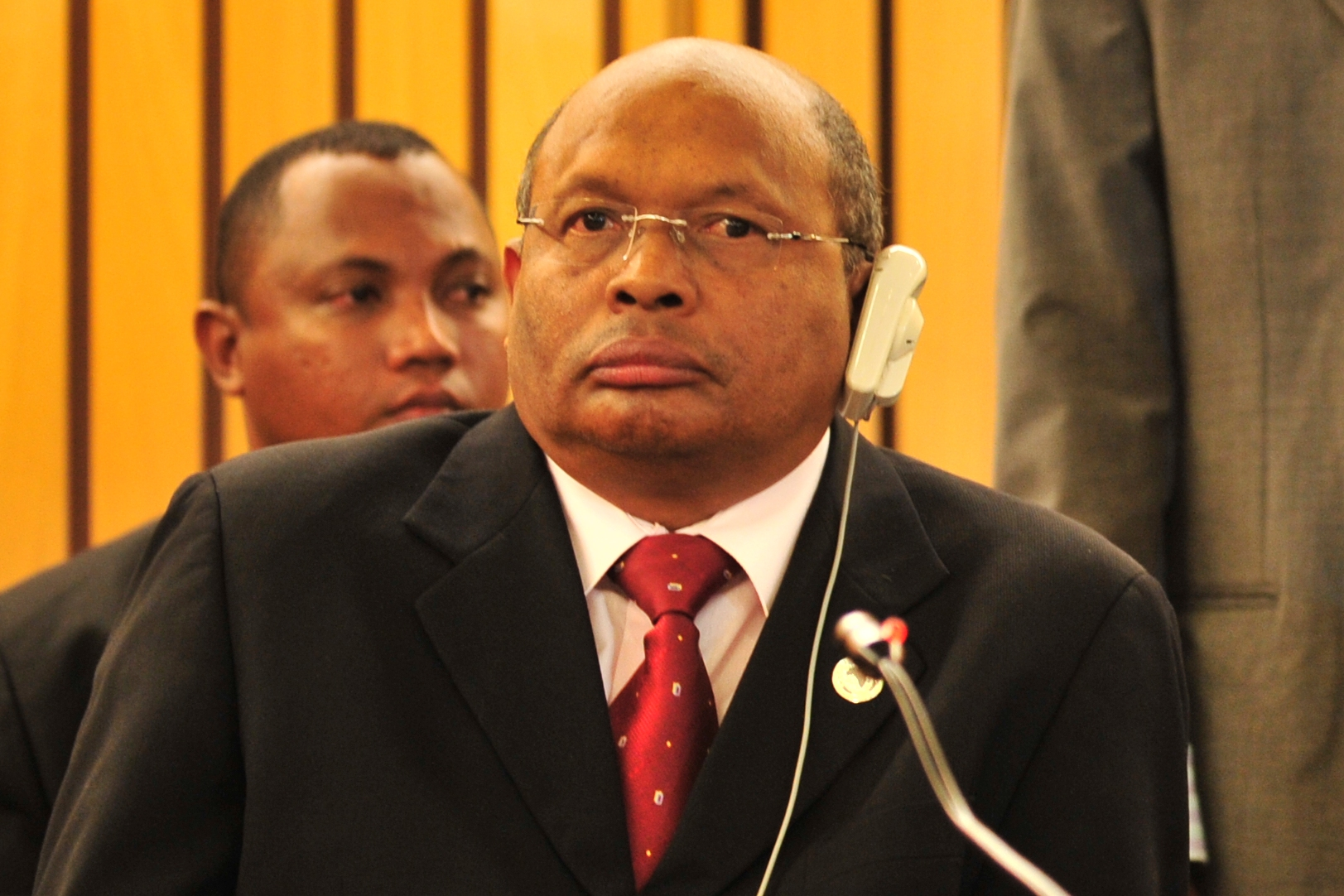
Marcel Ranjeva in February 2009

General Marcel Razanakombana Ranjeva (born 15 January 1944) is a Malagasy politician. He was the Minister of Defense in the government of Madagascar under President Didier Ratsiraka until he resigned on March 8, 2002, and pledged his support to Marc Ravalomanana, the opposition presidential candidate who claimed to have won the December 2001 presidential election. Ravalomanana appointed Ranjeva as Minister of Foreign Affairs in May 2002, and he remained Foreign Minister until Ravalomanana's ouster in March 2009. He was succeeded by Ny Hasina Andriamanjato on March 23, 2009; he was present for the ceremony transferring control of the ministry and wished Andriamanjato luck.
