= Ministry of foreign affairs =

Cabinet ministry in charge of a country's foreign affairs

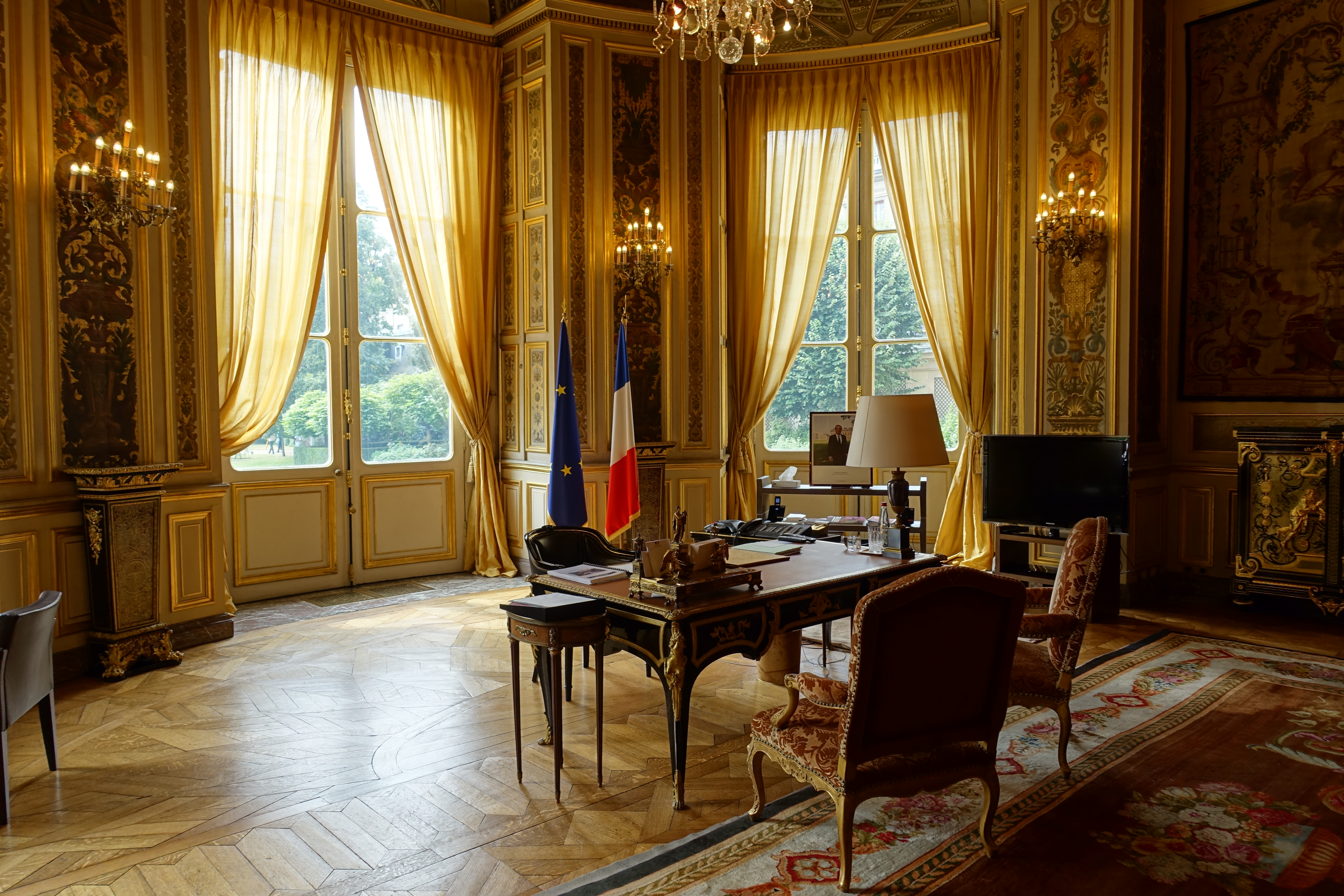
The office of the French Minister of Foreign Affairs on the Quai d'Orsay in Paris

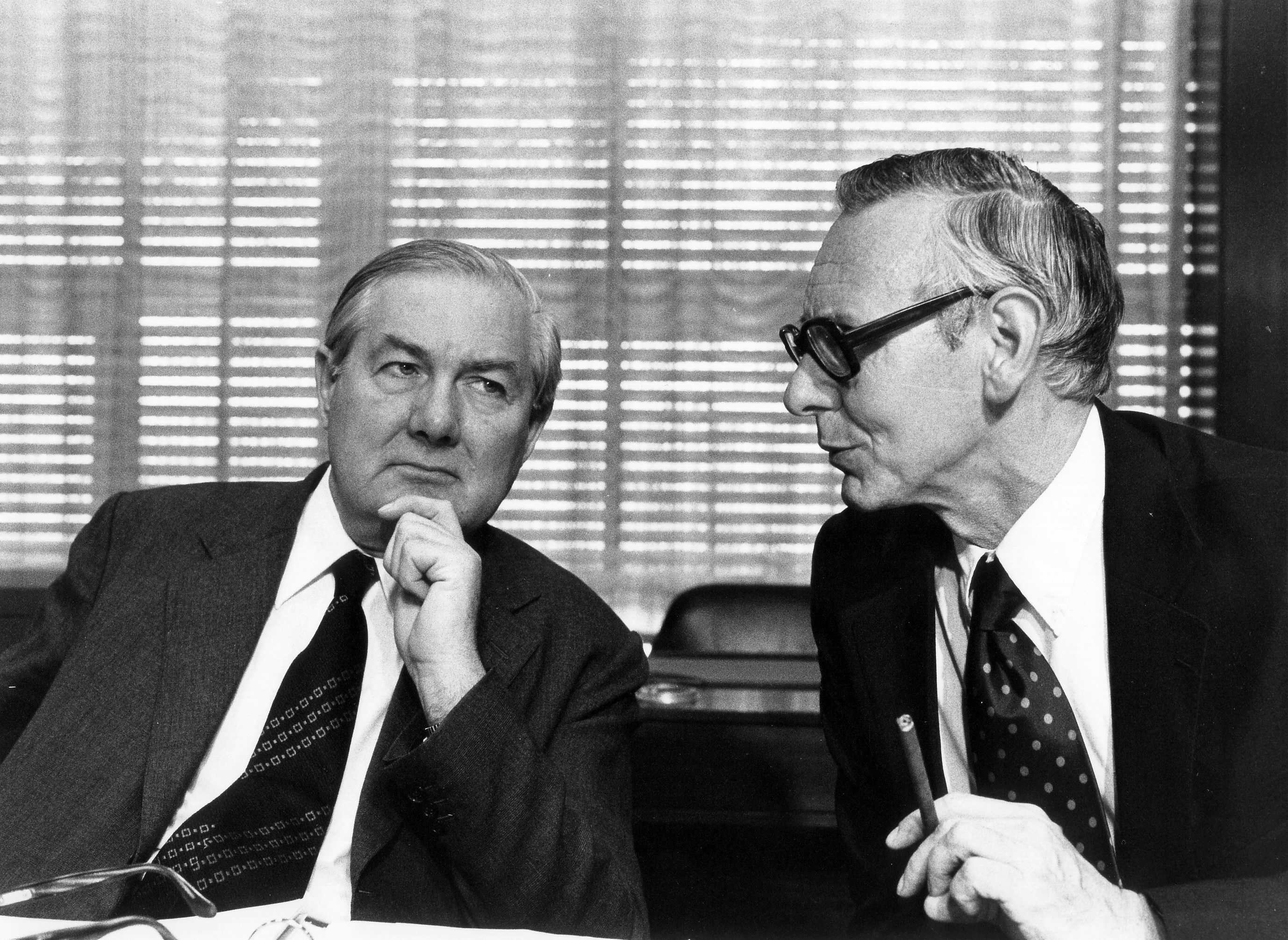
British Foreign Secretary James Callaghan and Dutch Minister of Foreign Affairs Max van der Stoel in 1975

In many countries, the ministry of foreign affairs (abbreviated as MFA or MOFA) is the highest government department exclusively or primarily responsible for the state's foreign policy and relations, diplomacy, bilateral, and multilateral relations affairs as well as for providing international support, including consular services, for a country's citizens who are abroad. The entity is usually headed by a foreign minister or minister of foreign affairs (the title may vary, such as a secretary of state who has the same functions). The foreign minister typically reports to the head of government (such as prime minister or president).

== Difference in titles ==
In some nations, such as India, the foreign minister is referred to as the minister for external affairs; or others, such as Brazil and the states created from the former Soviet Union, call the position the minister of external relations. In the United States, the secretary of state is the member of the Cabinet who handles foreign relations. Other common titles may include minister of foreign relations. In many countries of Latin America, the foreign minister is colloquially called "chancellor" (canciller in the Spanish-speaking countries and chanceler in the Portuguese-speaking Brazil).

Diplomats, themselves, and historians often refer to the foreign ministry by its local address, for example, the Ballhausplatz in Vienna housed the Foreign Ministry of Austria-Hungary; the Quai d'Orsay in Paris for France's Ministry of Europe and Foreign Affairs; the South Block in New Delhi for India's Ministry of External Affairs; the Necessidades Palace in Lisbon for Portugal's Ministry of Foreign Affairs; the Wilhelmstraße, in Berlin, was the location of the German Foreign Office; and Foggy Bottom, a neighborhood of Washington, D.C., houses the Department of State. The Ministry of External Relations of Brazil is often referred as the "Itamaraty" due to the two homonymous palaces that served as its headquarters, the original one in Rio de Janeiro (1899–1970) and the present Itamaraty Palace (since 1970) in Brasília. Indonesians also often refer to their Ministry of Foreign Affairs as "Pejambon", since the ministry's main headquarters is located at Pejambon Street, Central Jakarta. During the Russian Empire, which lasted until 1917, the term used was the Choristers' Bridge in Saint Petersburg. In contrast, the Italian ministry was called the Consulta.

== Powers of position ==
A foreign minister's powers vary from government to government. In a classic parliamentary system, a foreign minister can potentially exert significant influence in forming foreign policy but when the government is dominated by a strong prime minister, the foreign minister may be limited to playing a more marginal or subsidiary role in determining policy. Similarly, the political powers invested in the foreign minister are often more limited in presidential governments with a strong executive branch. Since the end of World War II, it has been common for both the foreign minister and defense minister to be part of an inner cabinet (commonly known as a national security council) in order to coordinate defense and diplomatic policy. Although the 19th and early 20th centuries saw many heads of government assume the foreign ministry, this practice has since become uncommon in most developed nations.

In some countries, the foreign minister is typically among the highest profiles of cabinet positions. For instance, in the US, its foreign minister is the first member of cabinet in line for the presidential line of succession (with the vice president, speaker of the United States House of Representatives, and president pro-tempore of the United States Senate ahead of the foreign minister). The UK's foreign secretary belongs to the four Great Offices of State (along with the prime minister, chancellor of the exchequer, and home secretary).

== Responsibilities ==
Along with their political roles, foreign ministers are also traditionally responsible for many diplomatic duties, such as hosting foreign world leaders and going on state visits to other countries. The foreign minister is generally the most well-traveled member of any cabinet.

- In the United Kingdom, the minister responsible for foreign policy (as well as the British Overseas Territories) is the Secretary of State for Foreign, Commonwealth and Development affairs (Foreign Secretary). Before 1968, the secretary of state for foreign affairs only handled relations with foreign (non-Commonwealth) countries, while relations with Commonwealth countries and colonies were handled by the secretary of state for Commonwealth affairs. For the same reason, in Commonwealth countries other than the United Kingdom, the ministers responsible for handling relations with both Commonwealth and non-Commonwealth countries were formerly usually designated ministers for external affairs.
- In the United States, the secretary of state handles foreign policy and is the senior Cabinet officer. The name of the post comes from several domestic duties. Under the Articles of Confederation, the title was "Secretary of Foreign Affairs".

Although it is very rare for there to be any sub-national foreign minister post, sometimes there is a minor external relations position. The European Union has dealt with external relations in certain areas since its inception (see EU Trade Commissioner) and has a high representative as its chief diplomat. However, his or her duties are primarily to implement EU foreign policy, rather than formulate it.

== Lists of current ministries of foreign affairs ==
=== Named "ministry" ===
- Ministry of Foreign Affairs (Afghanistan)
- Ministry for Europe and Foreign Affairs (Albania)
- Ministry of Foreign Affairs (Algeria)
- Ministry of External Affairs (Andorra)
- Ministry of External Relations (Angola)
- Ministry of Foreign Affairs, International Trade and Worship (Argentina)
- Ministry of Foreign Affairs (Armenia)
- Ministry of Foreign Affairs (Austria)
- Ministry of Foreign Affairs (Azerbaijan)
- Ministry of Foreign Affairs (The Bahamas)
- Ministry of Foreign Affairs (Bahrain)
- Ministry of Foreign Affairs (Bangladesh)
- Ministry of Foreign Affairs, Foreign Trade and International Business (Barbados)
- Ministry of Foreign Affairs (Belarus)
- Ministry of Foreign Affairs (Belize)
- Ministry of Foreign Affairs and Cooperation (Benin)
- Ministry of Foreign Affairs (Bhutan)
- Ministry of Foreign Affairs (Bolivia)
- Ministry of Foreign Affairs (Bosnia and Herzegovina)
- Ministry of Foreign Affairs (Botswana)
- Ministry of Foreign Affairs (Brazil)
- Ministry of Foreign Affairs (Brunei)
- Ministry of Foreign Affairs (Bulgaria)
- Ministry of Foreign Affairs and Development Cooperation (Burundi)
- Ministry of Foreign Affairs and International Cooperation (Cambodia)
- Minister of Foreign Affairs (Cameroon)
- Minister of Foreign Affairs (Central African Republic)
- Ministry of Foreign Affairs (Chile)
- Ministry of Foreign Affairs (China)
- Ministry of Foreign Affairs and Worship (Costa Rica)
- Ministry of Foreign Affairs (Colombia)
- Minister of Foreign Affairs (Republic of the Congo)
- Minister of Foreign Affairs (Ivory Coast)
- Ministry of Foreign and European Affairs (Croatia)
- Ministry of Foreign Affairs (Cuba)
- Ministry of Foreign Affairs (Czech Republic)
- Minister of Foreign Affairs (Democratic Republic of the Congo)
- Ministry of Foreign Affairs (Denmark)
- Ministry of Foreign Affairs (Dominican Republic)
- Ministry of Foreign Affairs (Egypt)
- Ministry of Foreign Affairs and International Cooperation (Equatorial Guinea)
- Ministry of Foreign Affairs (Eritrea)
- Ministry of Foreign Affairs (Estonia)
- Ministry of Foreign Affairs (Ethiopia)
- Ministry of Foreign Affairs and International Cooperation (Fiji)
- Ministry for Foreign Affairs (Finland)
- Ministry of Europe and Foreign Affairs (France)
- (Georgia (country)) Ministry of Foreign Affairs of Georgia
- Ministry for Foreign Affairs (Ghana)
- Ministry of Foreign Affairs (Greece)
- Ministry of Foreign Affairs (Guatemala)
- Ministry of Foreign Affairs (Guyana)
- Ministry of Foreign Affairs and Worship (Haiti)
- Ministry of Foreign Affairs (Hungary)
- Ministry for Foreign Affairs (Iceland)
- Ministry of External Affairs (India)
- Ministry of Foreign Affairs (Indonesia)
- Ministry of Foreign Affairs (Iran)
- Ministry of Foreign Affairs (Iraq)
- Ministry of Foreign Affairs (Israel)
- Ministry of Foreign Affairs (Italy)
- Ministry of Foreign Affairs and Foreign Trade (Jamaica)
- Ministry of Foreign Affairs (Japan)
- Ministry of Foreign Affairs and Expatriates (Jordan)
- Ministry of Foreign Affairs (Kazakhstan)
- Ministry of Foreign and Diaspora Affairs (Kenya)
- Ministry of Foreign Affairs and Immigration (Kiribati)
- Ministry of Foreign Affairs (North Korea)
- Ministry of Foreign Affairs (South Korea)
- Ministry of Foreign Affairs (Kosovo)
- Ministry of Foreign Affairs (Kuwait)
- Ministry of Foreign Affairs (Kyrgyzstan)
- Ministry of Foreign Affairs (Laos)
- Ministry of Foreign Affairs (Latvia)
- Ministry of Foreign Affairs and Emigrants (Lebanon)
- Ministry of Foreign Affairs and International Relations (Lesotho)
- Ministry of Foreign Affairs (Liberia)
- Ministry of Foreign Affairs (Lithuania)
- Ministry of Foreign Affairs (Luxembourg)
- Ministry of Foreign Affairs (North Macedonia)
- Ministry of Foreign Affairs (Malaysia)
- Ministry of Foreign Affairs (Maldives)
- Ministry for Foreign and European Affairs (Malta)
- Ministry of Foreign Affairs (Mauritania)
- Ministry of Foreign Affairs (Moldova)
- Ministry of Foreign Affairs (Mongolia)
- Ministry of Foreign Affairs (Montenegro)
- Ministry of Foreign Affairs, African Cooperation and Moroccan Expatriates (Morocco)
- Ministry of Foreign Affairs (Myanmar)
- Ministry of Foreign Affairs (Nepal)
- Ministry of Foreign Affairs (Netherlands)
- Ministry of Foreign Affairs and Trade (New Zealand)
- Ministry of Foreign Affairs, Cooperation and African Integration (Niger)
- Ministry of Foreign Affairs (Norway)
- Foreign Ministry (Oman)
- Ministry of Foreign Affairs (Pakistan)
- Ministry of Foreign Affairs and Expatriates (Palestine)
- Ministry of Foreign Affairs (Paraguay)
- Ministry of Foreign Affairs (Peru)
- Ministry of Foreign Affairs (Poland)
- Ministry of Foreign Affairs (Portugal)
- Ministry of Foreign Affairs (Qatar)
- Ministry of Foreign Affairs (Romania)
- Ministry of Foreign Affairs (Russia)
- Ministry of Foreign Affairs and Cooperation (Rwanda)
- Ministry of Foreign Affairs (Sahrawi Arab Democratic Republic)
- Ministry of Foreign Affairs (Saint Kitts and Nevis)
- Ministry of Foreign Affairs, Cooperation and Communities (São Tomé and Príncipe)
- Ministry of Foreign Affairs (Saudi Arabia)
- Ministry of Foreign Affairs (Serbia)
- Ministry of Foreign Affairs (Seychelles)
- Ministry of Foreign Affairs (Singapore)
- Ministry of Foreign and European Affairs (Slovakia)
- Ministry of Foreign and European Affairs (Slovenia)
- Ministry of Foreign Affairs (Somalia)
- Ministry of Foreign Affairs (Somaliland)
- Ministry of Foreign Affairs and International Cooperation (South Sudan)
- Ministry of Foreign Affairs, European Union and Cooperation (Spain)
- Ministry of Foreign Affairs (Sri Lanka)
- Ministry of Foreign Affairs (Sudan)
- Ministry for Foreign Affairs (Sweden)
- Ministry of Foreign Affairs and Expatriates (Syria)
- Ministry of Foreign Affairs (Taiwan)
- Ministry of Foreign Affairs (Tajikistan)
- Ministry of Foreign Affairs and East African Cooperation (Tanzania)
- Ministry of Foreign Affairs (Thailand)
- Ministry of Foreign Affairs and Cooperation (Timor-Leste)
- Minister of Foreign Affairs (Tonga)
- Ministry of Foreign Affairs (Transnistria)
- Ministry of Foreign Affairs (Tunisia)
- Ministry of Foreign Affairs (Turkey)
- Ministry of Foreign Affairs (Turkmenistan)
- Ministry of Foreign Affairs (Uganda)
- Ministry of Foreign Affairs (Ukraine)
- Ministry of Foreign Affairs (United Arab Emirates)
- Ministry of Foreign Relations (Uruguay)
- Ministry of Foreign Affairs (Uzbekistan)
- Ministry of Foreign Affairs (Venezuela)
- Ministry of Foreign Affairs (Vietnam)
- Ministry of Foreign Affairs (Yemen)
- Ministry of Foreign Affairs (Zambia)
- Ministry of Foreign Affairs (Zimbabwe)

=== Equivalents named "department" ===
- Department of Foreign Affairs and Trade (Australia)
- (Republic of Ireland) Department of Foreign Affairs and Trade (Ireland)
- Department of External Relations (Monaco)
- Department of Foreign Affairs (Philippines)
- Department of International Relations and Cooperation (South Africa)
- Federal Department of Foreign Affairs (Switzerland)
- United States Department of State

=== Other names ===
- Federal Public Service Foreign Affairs (Belgium)
- Global Affairs Canada
- European External Action Service (European Union)
- Federal Foreign Office (Germany)
- Secretariat of State (Holy See)
- Secretariat of Foreign Affairs (Honduras)
- Office of the Commissioner (Hong Kong)
- Office of the Commissioner (Macau)
- Secretariat of Foreign Affairs (Mexico)
- Foreign, Commonwealth and Development Office (United Kingdom)

== Historical ==
=== Named "ministry" ===
- Foreign Ministry of Austria-Hungary
- (Dominion of Ceylon) Ministry of External Affairs and Defence (Ceylon)
- Ministry of Foreign Affairs (Czechoslovakia)
- Foreign Ministry of the Independent State of Croatia
- Ministry for Foreign Affairs (East Germany)
- Ministry of Foreign Affairs (Hawaii)
- Ministry of Foreign Affairs (Ottoman Empire)
- (Kingdom of Prussia) Ministry of Foreign Affairs (Prussia)
- (Kingdom of Prussia) Prussian Ministry of the Interior
- (Russian Empire) Ministry of Foreign Affairs (Imperial Russia)
- Ministry of Foreign Affairs (Soviet Union)
- (Socialist Federal Republic of Yugoslavia) Ministry of Foreign Affairs (Yugoslavia)

== Lists ==
- List of current foreign ministers
- List of female foreign ministers

=== By year ===
- 1950
- 1990, 1991, 1992, 1993, 1994, 1995, 1996, 1997, 1998, 1999
- 2000, 2001, 2002, 2003, 2004, 2005, 2006, 2007, 2008, 2009
- 2010, 2011, 2012, 2013, 2014, 2015, 2016, 2017, 2018, 2019
- 2020, 2021, 2022, 2023, 2024, 2025
