= List of foreign ministers in 2000 =

This is a list of foreign ministers in 2000.

== Africa ==
- Algeria -
  1. Youcef Yousfi (1999-2000)
  2. Abdelaziz Belkhadem (2000-2005)
- Angola - João Bernardo de Miranda (1999-2008)
- Benin - Antoine Idji Kolawolé (1998-2003)
- Botswana - Mompati Merafhe (1994-2008)
- Burkina Faso - Youssouf Ouedraogo (1999-2007)
- Burundi - Severin Ntahomvukiye (1998-2001)
- Cameroon - Augustin Kontchou Kouomegni (1997-2001)
- Cape Verde -
  1. José Luís de Jesus (1998-2000)
  2. Rui Alberto de Figueiredo Soares (2000-2001)
- Central African Republic - Marcel Metefara (1999-2001)
- Chad - Mahamat Saleh Annadif (1997-2003)
- Comoros - Mohamed El-Amine Souef (1999-2002)
- Republic of Congo - Rodolphe Adada (1997-2007)
- Democratic Republic of Congo -
  1. Abdoulaye Yerodia Ndombasi (1999-2000)
  2. Léonard She Okitundu (2000-2003)
- Côte d'Ivoire -
  1. Amara Essy (1990-2000)
  2. Christophe Mboua (2000)
  3. Charles Gomis (2000)
  4. Abou Drahamane Sangare (2000-2003)
- Djibouti - Ali Abdi Farah (1999-2005)
- Egypt - Amr Moussa (1991-2001)
- Equatorial Guinea - Santiago Nsobeya Efuman (1999-2003)
- Eritrea -
  1. Haile Woldetensae (1997-2000)
  2. Ali Said Abdella (2000-2005)
- Ethiopia - Seyoum Mesfin (1991-2010)
- Gabon - Jean Ping (1999-2008)
- The Gambia - Momodou Lamin Sedat Jobe (1998-2001)
- Ghana - Victor Gbeho (1997-2001)
- Guinea -
  1. Zainoul Abidine Sanoussy (1999-2000)
  2. Mahawa Bangoura (2000-2002)
- Guinea-Bissau -
  1. José Pereira Baptista (1999-2000)
  2. Yaya Diallo (2000-2001)
- Kenya - Bonaya Godana (1998-2001)
- Kyrgyzstan - Muratbek Imanaliyev (1997-2002)
- Lesotho - Tom Thabane (1998-2002)
- Liberia - Monie Captan (1996-2003)
- Libya -
  1. Umar Mustafa al-Muntasir (1992-2000)
  2. Abdel Rahman Shalgham (2000-2009)
- Madagascar - Lila Ratsifandrihamanana (1998-2002)
- Malawi -
  1. Brown Mpinganjira (1999-2000)
  2. Lilian Patel (2000-2004)
- Mali - Modibo Sidibe (1997-2002)
- Mauritania - Ahmed Ould Sid'Ahmed (1998-2001)
- Mauritius -
  1. Rajkeswur Purryag (1997-2000)
  2. Anil Gayan (2000-2003)
- Morocco - Mohamed Benaissa (1999-2007)
  - Western Sahara - Mohamed Salem Ould Salek (1998–2023)
- Mozambique - Leonardo Simão (1994-2005)
- Namibia - Theo-Ben Gurirab (1990-2002)
- Niger -
  1. Aïchatou Mindaoudou (1999-2000)
  2. Nassirou Sabo (2000-2001)
- Nigeria - Sule Lamido (1999-2003)
- Rwanda -
  1. Augustin Iyamuremye (1999-2000)
  2. André Bumaya (2000-2002)
- São Tomé and Príncipe -
  1. Paulo Jorge Espirito Santo (1999-2000)
  2. Joaquim Rafael Branco (2000-2001)
- Senegal -
  1. Jacques Baudin (1998-2000)
  2. Cheikh Tidiane Gadio (2000-2009)
- Seychelles - Jérémie Bonnelame (1997-2005)
- Sierra Leone - Sama Banya (1998-2001)
- Somalia - Ismail Mahmud Hurre (2000-2002)
  - Somaliland - Mahmud Salah Nur (1997-2001)
- South Africa - Nkosazana Dlamini-Zuma (1999-2009)
- Sudan - Mustafa Osman Ismail (1998-2005)
- Swaziland - Albert Nhlanhla Shabangu (1998-2001)
- Tanzania - Jakaya Kikwete (1995-2006)
- Togo -
  1. Joseph Kokou Koffigoh (1998-2000)
  2. Koffi Panou (2000-2002)
- Tunisia - Habib Ben Yahia (1999-2004)
- Uganda - Eriya Kategaya (1996-2001)
- Zambia - Keli Walubita (1997-2002)
- Zimbabwe - Stan Mudenge (1995-2005)

== Asia ==
- Afghanistan - Wakil Ahmed Muttawakil (1999-2001)
- Armenia - Vartan Oskanian (1998-2008)
- Azerbaijan - Vilayat Guliyev (1999-2004)
  - Nagorno-Karabakh - Naira Melkumian (1997-2002)
- Bahrain - Sheikh Muhammad ibn Mubarak ibn Hamad Al Khalifah (1971-2005)
- Bangladesh - Abdus Samad Azad (1996-2001)
- Bhutan - Jigme Thinley (1998-2003)
- Brunei - Pengiran Muda Mohamed Bolkiah (1984–2015)
- Cambodia - Hor Namhong (1998–2016)
- China - Tang Jiaxuan (1998-2003)
- East Timor - José Ramos-Horta (2000-2006)
- Georgia - Irakli Menagarishvili (1995-2003)
  - Abkhazia - Sergei Shamba (1997-2004)
  - South Ossetia - Murat Dzhioyev (1998-2012)
- India - Jaswant Singh (1998-2002)
- Indonesia - Alwi Shihab (1999-2001)
- Iran - Kamal Kharazi (1997-2005)
- Iraq - Muhammad Saeed al-Sahhaf (1992-2001)
- Israel -
  1. David Levy (1999-2000)
  2. Ehud Barak (acting) (2000)
  3. Shlomo Ben-Ami (2000-2001)
- Japan - Yōhei Kōno (1999-2001)
- Jordan - Abdul Ilah Khatib (1998-2002)
- Kazakhstan - Erlan Idrisov (1999-2002)
- North Korea - Paek Nam-sun (1998-2007)
- South Korea -
  1. Hong Soon-young (1998-2000)
  2. Yi Jeong-bin (2000-2001)
- Kuwait - Sheikh Sabah Al-Ahmad Al-Jaber Al-Sabah (1978-2003)
- Kyrgyzstan - Muratbek Imanaliyev (1997-2002)
- Laos - Somsavat Lengsavad (1993-2006)
- Lebanon -
  1. Selim al-Hoss (1998-2000)
  2. Mahmoud Hammoud (2000-2003)
- Malaysia - Syed Hamid Albar (1999-2008)
- Maldives - Fathulla Jameel (1978-2005)
- Mongolia -
  1. Nyam-Osoryn Tuyaa (1998-2000)
  2. Luvsangiin Erdenechuluun (2000-2004)
- Myanmar - Win Aung (1998-2004)
- Nepal -
  1. Ram Sharan Mahat (1999-2000)
  2. Chakra Bastola (2000-2001)
- Oman - Yusuf bin Alawi bin Abdullah (1982–2020)
- Pakistan - Abdul Sattar (1999-2002)
- Philippines - Domingo Siazon, Jr. (1995-2001)
- Qatar - Sheikh Hamad bin Jassim bin Jaber Al Thani (1992–2013)
- Saudi Arabia - Prince Saud bin Faisal bin Abdulaziz Al Saud (1975–2015)
- Singapore - S. Jayakumar (1994-2004)
- Sri Lanka - Lakshman Kadirgamar (1994-2001)
- Syria - Farouk al-Sharaa (1984-2006)
- Taiwan -
  1. Chen Chien-jen (1999-2000)
  2. Tien Hung-mao (2000-2002)
- Tajikistan - Talbak Nazarov (1994-2006)
- Thailand - Surin Pitsuwan (1997-2001)
- Turkey - İsmail Cem (1997-2002)
- Turkmenistan -
  1. Boris Şyhmyradow (1995-2000)
  2. Batyr Berdiýew (2000-2001)
- United Arab Emirates - Rashid Abdullah Al Nuaimi (1980-2006)
- Uzbekistan - Abdulaziz Komilov (1994-2003)
- Vietnam -
  1. Nguyễn Mạnh Cầm (1991-2000)
  2. Nguyễn Dy Niên (2000-2006)
- Yemen - Abdul Qadir Bajamal (1998-2001)

== Australia and Oceania ==
- Australia - Alexander Downer (1996-2007)
- Fiji -
  1. Tupeni Baba (1999-2000)
  2. Kaliopate Tavola (2000-2006)
- French Polynesia - Gaston Flosse (2000-2004)
- Kiribati - Teburoro Tito (1994-2003)
- Marshall Islands -
  1. Phillip H. Muller (1994-2000)
  2. Alvin Jacklick (2000-2001)
- Micronesia -
  1. Epel K. Ilon (1997-2000)
  2. Ieske K. Iehsi (2000-2003)
- Nauru -
  1. René Harris (1999-2000)
  2. Bernard Dowiyogo (2000-2001)
- New Zealand - Phil Goff (1999-2005)
  - Cook Islands - Robert Woonton (1999-2004)
  - Niue - Sani Lakatani (1999-2002)
- Palau - Sabino Anastacio (1997-2000)
- Papua New Guinea -
  1. Sir John Kaputin (1999-2000)
  2. Sir Michael Somare (2000)
  3. Bart Philemon (2000-2001)
- Samoa - Tuilaepa Sailele Malielegaoi (1998–2021)
- Solomon Islands -
  1. Patterson Oti (1997-2000)
  2. Danny Philip (2000-2001)
- Tonga - Prince 'Ulukalala Lavaka Ata (1998-2004)
- Tuvalu -
  1. Ionatana Ionatana (1999-2000)
  2. Lagitupu Tuilimu (2000-2001)
- Vanuatu - Serge Vohor (1999-2001)

== Europe ==
- Albania - Paskal Milo (1997-2001)
- Andorra - Albert Pintat (1997-2001)
- Austria -
  1. Wolfgang Schüssel (1995-2000)
  2. Benita Ferrero-Waldner (2000-2004)
- Belarus -
  1. Ural Latypov (1998-2000)
  2. Mikhail Khvostov (2000-2003)
- Belgium - Louis Michel (1999-2004)
  - Brussels-Capital Region -
    1. Annemie Neyts-Uyttebroeck (1999-2000)
    2. Guy Vanhengel (2000-2009)
  - Flanders - Patrick Dewael (1999-2001)
- Bosnia and Herzegovina - Jadranko Prlić (1996-2001)
- Bulgaria - Nadezhda Mihailova (1997-2001)
- Croatia -
  1. Mate Granić (1993-2000)
  2. Tonino Picula (2000-2003)
- Cyprus - Ioannis Kasoulidis (1997-2003)
  - Northern Cyprus - Tahsin Ertuğruloğlu (1998-2004)
- Czech Republic - Jan Kavan (1998-2002)
- Denmark -
  1. Niels Helveg Petersen (1993-2000)
  2. Mogens Lykketoft (2000-2001)
- Estonia - Toomas Hendrik Ilves (1999-2002)
- Finland -
  1. Tarja Halonen (1995-2000)
  2. Erkki Tuomioja (2000-2007)
- France - Hubert Védrine (1997-2002)
- Germany - Joschka Fischer (1998-2005)
- Greece - George Papandreou (1999-2004)
- Hungary - János Martonyi (1998-2002)
- Iceland - Halldór Ásgrímsson (1995-2004)
- Ireland -
  1. David Andrews (1997-2000)
  2. Brian Cowen (2000-2004)
- Italy - Lamberto Dini (1996-2001)
- Latvia - Indulis Bērziņš (1999-2002)
- Liechtenstein - Andrea Willi (1993-2001)
- Lithuania -
  1. Algirdas Saudargas (1996-2000)
  2. Antanas Valionis (2000-2006)
- Luxembourg - Lydie Polfer (1999-2004)
- Republic of Macedonia -
  1. Aleksandar Dimitrov (1998-2000)
  2. Srgjan Kerim (2000-2001)
- Malta - Joe Borg (1999-2004)
- Moldova -
  1. Nicolae Tăbăcaru (1997-2000)
  2. Nicolae Cernomaz (2000-2001)
  - Transnistria - Valeriy Litskai (2000-2008)
- Netherlands - Jozias van Aartsen (1998-2002)
- Norway -
  1. Knut Vollebæk (1997-2000)
  2. Thorbjørn Jagland (2000-2001)
- Poland -
  1. Bronisław Geremek (1997-2000)
  2. Władysław Bartoszewski (2000-2001)
- Portugal - Jaime Gama (1995-2002)
- Romania -
  1. Petre Roman (1999-2000)
  2. Mircea Geoană (2000-2004)
- Russia - Igor Ivanov (1998-2004)
- San Marino - Gabriele Gatti (1986-2002)
- Slovakia - Eduard Kukan (1998-2006)
- Slovenia -
  1. Boris Frlec (1997-2000)
  2. Dimitrij Rupel (2000)
  3. Lojze Peterle (2000)
  4. Dimitrij Rupel (2000-2004)
- Spain -
  1. Abel Matutes (1996-2000)
  2. Josep Piqué (2000-2002)
- Sweden - Anna Lindh (1998-2003)
- Switzerland - Joseph Deiss (1999-2002)
- Ukraine -
  1. Borys Tarasyuk (1998-2000)
  2. Anatoliy Zlenko (2000-2003)
- United Kingdom - Robin Cook (1997-2001)
  - Scotland - Jack McConnell (2000-2001)
- Vatican City - Archbishop Jean-Louis Tauran (1990-2003)
- Yugoslavia -
  1. Živadin Jovanović (1998-2000)
  2. Zoran Novaković (acting) (2000)
  3. Goran Svilanović (2000-2004)
  - Montenegro -
    1. Branko Perović (1997-2000)
    2. Branko Lukovac (2000-2002)

== North America and the Caribbean ==
- Antigua and Barbuda - Lester Bird (1991-2004)
- The Bahamas - Janet Bostwick (1994-2002)
- Barbados - Billie Miller (1994-2008)
- Belize - Said Musa (1998-2002)
- Canada -
  1. Lloyd Axworthy (1996-2000)
  2. John Manley (2000-2002)
  - Quebec - Louise Beaudoin (1998-2003)
- Costa Rica - Roberto Rojas López (1998-2002)
- Cuba - Felipe Pérez Roque (1999-2009)
- Dominica -
  1. Norris Charles (1998-2000)
  2. Rosie Douglas (2000)
  3. Pierre Charles (2000-2001)
- Dominican Republic -
  1. Eduardo Latorre Rodríguez (1996-2000)
  2. Hugo Tolentino Dipp (2000-2003)
- El Salvador - María Eugenia Brizuela de Ávila (1999-2004)
- Grenada -
  1. Mark Isaac (1999-2000)
  2. Elvin Nimrod (2000-2008)
- Guatemala -
  1. Eduardo Stein (1996-2000)
  2. Gabriel Orellana Rojas (2000-2002)
- Haiti - Fritz Longchamp (1995-2001)
- Honduras - Roberto Flores Bermúdez (1999-2002)
- Jamaica -
  1. Seymour Mullings (1995-2000)
  2. Paul Robertson (2000-2001)
- Mexico -
  1. Rosario Green (1998-2000)
  2. Jorge Castañeda Gutman (2000-2003)
- Nicaragua -
  1. Eduardo Montealegre (1998-2000)
  2. José Adán Guerra Pastora (2000)
  3. Francisco Aguirre Sacasa (2000-2002)
- Panama - José Miguel Alemán Healy (1999-2003)
- Puerto Rico – Angel Morey (1999–2001)
- Saint Kitts and Nevis -
  1. Denzil Douglas (1995-2000)
  2. Sam Condor (2000-2001)
- Saint Lucia - George Odlum (1997-2001)
- Saint Vincent and the Grenadines - Allan Cruickshank (1998-2001)
- Trinidad and Tobago -
  1. Ralph Maraj (1995-2000)
  2. Mervyn Assam (2000-2001)
- United States - Madeleine Albright (1997-2001)

== South America ==
- Argentina - Adalberto Rodríguez Giavarini (1999-2001)
- Bolivia - Javier Murillo de la Rocha (1997-2001)
- Brazil - Luiz Felipe Palmeira Lampreia (1995-2001)
- Chile -
  1. Juan Gabriel Valdés (1999-2000)
  2. Soledad Alvear (2000-2004)
- Colombia - Guillermo Fernández de Soto (1998-2002)
- Ecuador -
  1. Benjamín Ortiz Brennan (1999-2000)
  2. Heinz Moeller Freile (2000-2003)
- Guyana - Clement Rohee (1992-2001)
- Paraguay -
  1. José Félix Fernández Estigarribia (1999-2000)
  2. Juan Esteban Aguirre Martínez (2000-2001)
- Peru -
  1. Fernando de Trazegnies (1998-2000)
  2. Javier Pérez de Cuéllar (2000-2001)
- Suriname -
  1. Errol Snijders (1997-2000)
  2. Marie Levens (2000-2005)
- Uruguay - Didier Opertti (1998-2005)
- Venezuela - José Vicente Rangel (1999-2001)
