= List of foreign ministers in 2001 =

This is a list of foreign ministers in 2001.

== Africa ==
- Algeria - Abdelaziz Belkhadem (2000-2005)
- Angola - João Bernardo de Miranda (1999-2008)
- Benin - Antoine Idji Kolawolé (1998-2003)
- Botswana - Mompati Merafhe (1994-2008)
- Burkina Faso - Youssouf Ouedraogo (1999-2007)
- Burundi -
  1. Severin Ntahomvukiye (1998-2001)
  2. Thérence Sinunguruza (2001-2005)
- Cameroon -
  1. Augustin Kontchou Kouomegni (1997-2001)
  2. François Xavier Ngoubeyou (2001-2004)
- Cape Verde -
  1. Rui Alberto de Figueiredo Soares (2000-2001)
  2. Manuel Inocêncio Sousa (2001-2002)
- Central African Republic -
  1. Marcel Metefara (1999-2001)
  2. Agba Otikpo Mézodé (2001-2003)
- Chad - Mahamat Saleh Annadif (1997-2003)
- Comoros - Mohamed El-Amine Souef (1999-2002)
- Republic of Congo - Rodolphe Adada (1997-2007)
- Democratic Republic of Congo - Léonard She Okitundu (2000-2003)
- Côte d'Ivoire - Abou Drahamane Sangare (2000-2003)
- Djibouti - Ali Abdi Farah (1999-2005)
- Egypt -
  1. Amr Moussa (1991-2001)
  2. Ahmed Maher (2001-2004)
- Equatorial Guinea - Santiago Nsobeya Efuman (1999-2003)
- Eritrea - Ali Said Abdella (2000-2005)
- Ethiopia - Seyoum Mesfin (1991-2010)
- Gabon - Jean Ping (1999-2008)
- The Gambia -
  1. Momodou Lamin Sedat Jobe (1998-2001)
  2. Baboucarr-Blaise Jagne (2001-2004)
- Ghana -
  1. James Victor Gbeho (1997-2001)
  2. Hackman Owusu-Agyeman (2001-2003)
- Guinea - Mahawa Bangoura (2000-2002)
- Guinea-Bissau -
  1. Yaya Diallo (2000-2001)
  2. Faustino Imbali (2001)
  3. Antonieta Rosa Gomes (2001)
  4. Malam Mané (2001)
  5. Filomena Mascarenhas Tipote (2001-2002)
- Kenya -
  1. Bonaya Godana (1998-2001)
  2. Christopher Obure (2001)
  3. Marsden Madoka (2001-2003)
- Lesotho - Tom Thabane (1998-2002)
- Liberia - Monie Captan (1996-2003)
- Libya - Abdel Rahman Shalgham (2000-2009)
- Madagascar - Lila Ratsifandrihamanana (1998-2002)
- Malawi - Lilian Patel (2000-2004)
- Mali - Modibo Sidibe (1997-2002)
- Mauritania -
  1. Ahmed Ould Sid'Ahmed (1998-2001)
  2. Dah Ould Abdi (2001-2002)
- Mauritius - Anil Gayan (2000-2003)
- Morocco - Mohamed Benaissa (1999-2007)
  - Western Sahara - Mohamed Salem Ould Salek (1998–2023)
- Mozambique - Leonardo Simão (1994-2005)
- Namibia - Theo-Ben Gurirab (1990-2002)
- Niger -
  1. Nassirou Sabo (2000-2001)
  2. Aïchatou Mindaoudou (2001-2010)
- Nigeria - Sule Lamido (2000-2003)
- Rwanda - André Bumaya (2000-2002)
- São Tomé and Príncipe -
  1. Joaquim Rafael Branco (2000-2001)
  2. Patrice Trovoada (2001-2002)
- Senegal - Cheikh Tidiane Gadio (2000-2009)
- Seychelles - Jérémie Bonnelame (1997-2005)
- Sierra Leone -
  1. Sama Banya (1998-2001)
  2. Ahmed Ramadan Dumbuya (2001-2002)
- Somalia - Ismail Mahmud Hurre (2000-2002)
  - Somaliland -
    1. Mahmud Salah Nur (1997-2001)
    2. Abdihamid Garad Jama (2001-2002)
- South Africa - Nkosazana Dlamini-Zuma (1999-2009)
- Sudan - Mustafa Osman Ismail (1998-2005)
- Swaziland -
  1. Albert Nhlanhla Shabangu (1998-2001)
  2. Abednego Ntshangase (2001-2003)
- Tanzania - Jakaya Kikwete (1995-2006)
- Togo - Joseph Kokou Koffigoh (2000-2002)
- Tunisia - Habib Ben Yahia (1999-2004)
- Uganda -
  1. Eriya Kategaya (1996-2001)
  2. James Wapakhabulo (2001-2004)
- Zambia - Keli Walubita (1997-2002)
- Zimbabwe - Stan Mudenge (1995-2005)

== Asia ==
- Afghanistan -
  1. Wakil Ahmed Muttawakil (1999-2001)
  2. Abdullah Abdullah (2001-2006)
- Armenia - Vartan Oskanian (1998-2008)
- Azerbaijan - Vilayat Guliyev (1999-2004)
  - Nagorno-Karabakh - Naira Melkumian (1997-2002)
- Bahrain - Sheikh Muhammad ibn Mubarak ibn Hamad Al Khalifah (1971-2005)
- Bangladesh -
  1. Abdus Samad Azad (1996-2001)
  2. Latifur Rahman (2001)
  3. A.Q.M. Badruddoza Chowdhury (2001)
  4. Morshed Khan (2001-2006)
- Bhutan - Jigme Thinley (1998-2003)
- Brunei - Pengiran Muda Mohamed Bolkiah (1984–2015)
- Cambodia - Hor Namhong (1998–2016)
- China - Tang Jiaxuan (1998-2003)
- East Timor - José Ramos-Horta (2000-2006)
- Georgia - Irakli Menagarishvili (1995-2003)
  - Abkhazia - Sergei Shamba (1997-2004)
  - South Ossetia - Murat Dzhioyev (1998-2012)
- India - Jaswant Singh (1998-2002)
- Indonesia -
  1. Alwi Shihab (1999-2001)
  2. Hassan Wirajuda (2001-2009)
- Iran - Kamal Kharazi (1997-2005)
- Iraq -
  1. Muhammad Saeed al-Sahhaf (1992-2001)
  2. Tariq Aziz (acting) (2001)
  3. Naji Sabri (2001-2003)
- Israel -
  1. Shlomo Ben-Ami (2000-2001)
  2. Shimon Peres (2001-2002)
- Japan -
  1. Yōhei Kōno (1999-2001)
  2. Makiko Tanaka (2001-2002)
- Jordan - Abdul Ilah Khatib (1998-2002)
- Kazakhstan - Erlan Idrisov (1999-2002)
- North Korea - Paek Nam-sun (1998-2007)
- South Korea -
  1. Yi Jeong-bin (2000-2001)
  2. Han Seung-soo (2001-2002)
- Kuwait - Sheikh Sabah Al-Ahmad Al-Jaber Al-Sabah (1978-2003)
- Kyrgyzstan - Muratbek Imanaliyev (1997-2002)
- Laos - Somsavat Lengsavad (1993-2006)
- Lebanon - Mahmoud Hammoud (2000-2003)
- Malaysia - Syed Hamid Albar (1999-2008)
- Maldives - Fathulla Jameel (1978-2005)
- Mongolia - Luvsangiin Erdenechuluun (2000-2004)
- Myanmar - Win Aung (1998-2004)
- Nepal -
  1. Chakra Bastola (2000-2001)
  2. Sher Bahadur Deuba (2001-2002)
- Oman - Yusuf bin Alawi bin Abdullah (1982–2020)
- Pakistan - Abdul Sattar (1999-2002)
- Philippines -
  1. Domingo Siazon, Jr. (1995-2001)
  2. Teofisto Guingona, Jr. (2001-2002)
- Qatar - Sheikh Hamad bin Jassim bin Jaber Al Thani (1992-2013)
- Saudi Arabia - Prince Saud bin Faisal bin Abdulaziz Al Saud (1975–2015)
- Singapore - S. Jayakumar (1994-2004)
- Sri Lanka -
  1. Lakshman Kadirgamar (1994-2001)
  2. Tyronne Fernando (2001-2004)
- Syria - Farouk al-Sharaa (1984-2006)
- Taiwan - Tien Hung-mao (2000-2002)
- Tajikistan - Talbak Nazarov (1994-2006)
- Thailand -
  1. Surin Pitsuwan (1997-2001)
  2. Surakiart Sathirathai (2001-2005)
- Turkey - İsmail Cem (1997-2002)
- Turkmenistan -
  1. Batyr Berdiýew (2000-2001)
  2. Raşit Meredow (2001–present)
- United Arab Emirates - Rashid Abdullah Al Nuaimi (1980-2006)
- Uzbekistan - Abdulaziz Komilov (1994-2003)
- Vietnam - Nguyễn Dy Niên (2000-2006)
- Yemen -
  1. Abdul Qadir Bajamal (1998-2001)
  2. Abu Bakr al-Qirbi (2001-2014)

== Australia and Oceania ==
- Australia - Alexander Downer (1996-2007)
- Fiji - Kaliopate Tavola (2000-2006)
- French Polynesia - Gaston Flosse (2000-2004)
- Kiribati - Teburoro Tito (1994-2003)
- Marshall Islands -
  1. Alvin Jacklick (2000-2001)
  2. Gerald Zackios (2001-2008)
- Micronesia - Ieske K. Iehsi (2000-2003)
- Nauru -
  1. Bernard Dowiyogo (2000-2001)
  2. René Harris (2001-2003)
- New Zealand - Phil Goff (1999-2005)
  - Cook Islands - Robert Woonton (1999-2004)
  - Niue - Sani Lakatani (1999-2002)
- Palau - Temmy Shmull (2001-2009)
- Papua New Guinea -
  1. Bart Philemon (2000-2001)
  2. John Pundari (2001)
  3. John Waiko (2001-2002)
- Samoa - Tuilaepa Sailele Malielegaoi (1998–2021)
- Solomon Islands -
  1. Danny Philip (2000-2001)
  2. David Sitai (2001)
  3. Alex Bartlett (2001-2002)
- Tonga - Prince 'Ulukalala Lavaka Ata (1998-2004)
- Tuvalu -
  1. Lagitupu Tuilimu (2000-2001)
  2. Faimalaga Luka (2001)
  3. Koloa Talake (2001-2002)
- Vanuatu -
  1. Serge Vohor (1999-2001)
  2. Alain Mahe (2001-2002)

== Europe ==
- Albania -
  1. Paskal Milo (1997–2001)
  2. Arta Dade (2001–2002)
- Andorra -
  1. Albert Pintat (1997–2001)
  2. Juli Minoves Triquell (2001–2007)
- Austria - Benita Ferrero-Waldner (2000–2004)
- Belarus - Mikhail Khvostov (2000–2003)
- Belgium - Louis Michel (1999–2004)
  - Brussels-Capital Region - Guy Vanhengel (2000–2009)
  - Flanders -
    1. Patrick Dewael (1999–2001)
    2. Paul Van Grembergen (2001–2002)
- Bosnia and Herzegovina -
  1. Jadranko Prlić (1996–2001)
  2. Zlatko Lagumdžija (2001–2003)
- Bulgaria -
  1. Nadezhda Mihailova (1997–2001)
  2. Solomon Passy (2001–2005)
- Croatia - Tonino Picula (2000–2003)
- Cyprus - Ioannis Kasoulidis (1997–2003)
  - Northern Cyprus - Tahsin Ertuğruloğlu (1998–2004)
- Czech Republic - Jan Kavan (1998–2002)
- Denmark -
  1. Mogens Lykketoft (2000–2001)
  2. Per Stig Møller (2001–2010)
- Estonia - Toomas Hendrik Ilves (1999–2002)
- Finland - Erkki Tuomioja (2000–2007)
- France - Hubert Védrine (1997–2002)
- Germany - Joschka Fischer (1998–2005)
- Greece - George Papandreou (1999–2004)
- Hungary - János Martonyi (1998–2002)
- Iceland - Halldór Ásgrímsson (1995–2004)
- Ireland - Brian Cowen (2000–2004)
- Italy -
  1. Lamberto Dini (1996–2001)
  2. Renato Ruggiero (2001–2002)
- Latvia - Indulis Bērziņš (1999–2002)
- Liechtenstein -
  1. Andrea Willi (1993–2001)
  2. Ernst Walch (2001–2005)
- Lithuania - Antanas Valionis (2000–2006)
- Luxembourg - Lydie Polfer (1999–2004)
- Republic of Macedonia -
  1. Srgjan Kerim (2000–2001)
  2. Ilinka Mitreva (2001)
  3. Slobodan Čašule (2001–2002)
- Malta - Joe Borg (1999–2004)
- Moldova -
  1. Nicolae Cernomaz (2000–2001)
  2. Iurie Leancă (acting) (2001)
  3. Nicolae Dudău (2001–2004)
  - Transnistria - Valeriy Litskai (2000–2008)
- Netherlands - Jozias van Aartsen (1998–2002)
- Norway -
  1. Thorbjørn Jagland (2000–2001)
  2. Jan Petersen (2001–2005)
- Poland -
  1. Władysław Bartoszewski (2000–2001)
  2. Włodzimierz Cimoszewicz (2001–2005)
- Portugal - Jaime Gama (1995–2002)
- Romania - Mircea Geoană (2000–2004)
- Russia - Igor Ivanov (1998–2004)
- San Marino - Gabriele Gatti (1986–2002)
- Slovakia - Eduard Kukan (1998–2006)
- Slovenia - Dimitrij Rupel (2000–2004)
- Spain - Josep Piqué (2000–2002)
- Sweden - Anna Lindh (1998–2003)
- Switzerland - Joseph Deiss (1999–2002)
- Ukraine - Anatoliy Zlenko (2000–2003)
- United Kingdom -
  1. Robin Cook (1997–2001)
  2. Jack Straw (2001–2006)
  - Scotland - Jack McConnell (2000–2001)
- Vatican City - Archbishop Jean-Louis Tauran (1990–2003)
- Yugoslavia - Goran Svilanović (2000–2004)
  - Montenegro - Branko Lukovac (2000–2002)

== North America and the Caribbean ==
- Antigua and Barbuda - Lester Bird (1991-2004)
- The Bahamas - Janet Bostwick (1994-2002)
- Barbados - Billie Miller (1994-2008)
- Belize - Said Musa (1998-2002)
- Canada - John Manley (2000-2002)
  - Quebec - Louise Beaudoin (1998-2003)
- Costa Rica - Roberto Rojas López (1998-2002)
- Cuba - Felipe Pérez Roque (1999-2009)
- Dominica -
  1. Pierre Charles (2000-2001)
  2. Osborne Riviere (2001-2005)
- Dominican Republic - Hugo Tolentino Dipp (2000-2003)
- El Salvador - María Eugenia Brizuela de Ávila (1999-2004)
- Grenada - Elvin Nimrod (2000-2008)
- Guatemala - Gabriel Orellana Rojas (2000-2002)
- Haiti -
  1. Fritz Longchamp (1995-2001)
  2. Joseph Philippe Antonio (2001-2004)
- Honduras - Roberto Flores Bermúdez (1999-2002)
- Jamaica -
  1. Paul Robertson (2000-2001)
  2. Keith Desmond Knight (2001-2006)
- Mexico - Jorge Castañeda Gutman (2000-2003)
- Nicaragua - Francisco Aguirre Sacasa (2000-2002)
- Panama - José Miguel Alemán Healy (1999-2003)
- Saint Kitts and Nevis -
  1. Sam Condor (2000-2001)
  2. Timothy Harris (2001-2008)
- Saint Lucia -
  1. George Odlum (1997-2001)
  2. Julian Hunte (2001-2004)
- Puerto Rico –
  1. Angel Morey (1999–2001)
  2. Ferdinand Mercado (2001–2003)
- Saint Vincent and the Grenadines -
  1. Allan Cruickshank (1998-2001)
  2. Louis Straker (2001-2005)
- Trinidad and Tobago -
  1. Mervyn Assam (2000-2001)
  2. Knowlson Gift (2001-2006)
- United States -
  1. Madeleine Albright (1997-2001)
  2. Colin Powell (2001-2005)

== South America ==
- Argentina -
  1. Adalberto Rodríguez Giavarini (1999-2001)
  2. José María Vernet (2001-2002)
- Bolivia -
  1. Javier Murillo de la Rocha (1997-2001)
  2. Gustavo Fernández Saavedra (2001-2002)
- Brazil -
  1. Luiz Felipe Palmeira Lampreia (1995-2001)
  2. Luiz Felipe de Seixas Corrêa (acting) (2001)
  3. Celso Lafer (2001-2003)
- Chile - Soledad Alvear (2000-2004)
- Colombia - Guillermo Fernández de Soto (1998-2002)
- Ecuador - Heinz Moeller Freile (2000-2003)
- Guyana -
  1. Clement Rohee (1992-2001)
  2. Rudy Insanally (2001-2008)
- Paraguay -
  1. Juan Esteban Aguirre Martínez (2000-2001)
  2. José Antonio Moreno Ruffinelli (2001-2003)
- Peru -
  1. Javier Pérez de Cuéllar (2000-2001)
  2. Diego García Sayán (2001-2002)
- Suriname - Marie Levens (2000-2005)
- Uruguay - Didier Opertti (1998-2005)
- Venezuela -
  1. José Vicente Rangel (1999-2001)
  2. Luis Alfonso Dávila (2001-2002)
