= List of delegates to the Millennium Summit =

The Millennium Summit was a meeting among several world leaders that took place from September 6–8, 2000 at the United Nations headquarters in New York City in order to discuss the role of the United Nations in the turn of the 21st century. Over 150 heads of state, heads of government, crown princes, vice presidents, deputy prime ministers, and other delegates attended, making this summit the largest gathering of world leaders as of the year 2000.

The Millennium Summit was hosted by the United States and jointly presided over by President of Finland Tarja Halonen and President of Namibia Sam Nujoma.

== Delegations ==
Delegates to the Millennium Summit
Country	Delegate	Title	Notes
Afghanistan	Burhanuddin Rabbani	President of Afghanistan	
Albania	Rexhep Meidani	President of Albania	
Algeria	Abdelaziz Bouteflika	President of Algeria	
Andorra	Marc Forné Molné	Prime Minister of Andorra	
Angola	João Bernardo de Miranda	Minister of External Relations	
Antigua and Barbuda	Lester Bird	Prime Minister of Antigua and Barbuda	
Argentina	Fernando de la Rúa	President of Argentina	
Armenia	Robert Kocharyan	President of Armenia	
Australia	John Howard	Prime Minister of Australia	
Austria	Thomas Klestil	Federal President of Austria	
Azerbaijan	Heydar Alirza oglu Aliyev	President of Azerbaijan	
Bahamas	Orville Turnquest	Prime Minister of the Bahamas	
Bahrain	Muhammad ibn Mubarak ibn Hamad Al Khalifah	Minister of Foreign Affairs of Bahrain	
Bangladesh	Sheikh Hasina	President of Bangladesh	
Barbados	Billie Miller	Deputy prime minister	
Belarus	Alexander Lukashenko	President of Belarus	
Belgium	Guy Verhofstadt	Prime Minister of Belgium	
Belize	Said Musa	Prime Minister of Belize	
Benin	Mathieu Kérékou	President of Benin	
Bhutan	Sangay Ngedup	Prime Ministers of Bhutan	
Bolivia	Hugo Banzer	President of Bolivia	
Bosnia and Herzegovina	Alija Izetbegović	Presidency of Bosnia and Herzegovina	
Botswana	Festus G. Mogae	President of Botswana	
Brazil	Marco Maciel	Vice President of Brazil	
Brunei Darussalam	Hassanal Bolkiah	Sultan of Brunei	
Bulgaria	Petar Stoyanov	President of Bulgaria	
Burkina Faso	Michel Kafando	Chairperson of delegation	
Burundi	Severin Ntahomvukiye	Minister	
Cambodia	Hun Sen	Prime Minister of Cambodia	
Cameroon	Paul Biya	President of Cameroon	
Canada	Jean Chrétien	Prime Minister of Canada	
Cape Verde	António Mascarenhas Monteiro	President of Cape Verde	
Central African Republic	Marcel Metefara	Minister	
Chad	Nagoum Yamassoum	Head of government	
Chile	Ricardo Lagos Escobar	President of Chile	
China	Jiang Zemin	General Secretary of the Chinese Communist Party; President of China	
Colombia	Andrés Pastrana Arango	President of Colombia	
Comoros	Azali Assoumani	Head of state	
Republic of the Congo	Denis Sassou Nguesso	President of the Republic of the Congo	
Democratic Republic of the Congo	Abdoulaye Yerodia Ndombasi	Minister	
Costa Rica	Miguel Ángel Rodríguez Echeverría	President of Costa Rica	
Côte d'Ivoire	Charles Gomis	Minister	
Croatia	Stjepan Mesić	President of Croatia	
Cuba	Fidel Castro	First Secretary of the Communist Party of Cuba; President of the Council of State	
Cyprus	Glafcos Clerides	President of Cyprus	
Czech Republic	Václav Havel	President of the Czech Republic	
Denmark	Poul Nyrup Rasmussen	Head of government	
Djibouti	Ismaïl Omar Guelleh	President of Djibouti	
Dominica	Roosevelt Douglas	Head of government	
Dominican Republic	Hipólito Mejía Domínguez	Head of state	
Ecuador	Gustavo Noboa Bejarano	Head of state	
Egypt	Amr Moussa	Minister	
El Salvador	Francisco Guillermo Flores Pérez	Head of state	
Equatorial Guinea	Teodoro Obiang Nguema Mbasogo	Head of state	
Eritrea	Isaias Afwerki	Head of state	
Estonia	Mart Siimann	Head of government	
Ethiopia	Meles Zenawi	Head of government	
Finland	Tarja Halonen	Head of state	Co-chair of the Summit
France	Jacques Chirac	President of the French Republic	
Gabon	El Hadj Omar Bongo	Head of state	
Gambia	Yahya A.J.J. Jammeh	Head of state	
Georgia	Eduard A. Shevardnadze	Head of state	
Germany	Gerhard Schroeder	Chancellor of Germany	
Ghana	Jerry John Rawlings	Head of state	
Greece	Costas Simitis	Prime Minister of Greece	
Grenada	Keith Mitchell	Head of government	
Guatemala	Alfonso Portillo Cabrera	President of Guatemala	
Guinea	Lamine Sidimé	Head of government	
Guinea Bissau	Kumba Yalá	Head of state	
Guyana	Bharrat Jagdeo	Head of state	
Haiti	René Préval	Head of state	
Holy See	Angelo Sodano	Highest-ranking official	
Honduras	Carlos Roberto Flores Facussé	Head of state	
Hungary	Ferenc Mádl	Head of state	
Iceland	Davíð Oddsson	Head of government	
India	Atal Behari Vajpayee	Prime Minister of India	
Indonesia	K. H. Abdurrahman Wahid	President of Indonesia	
Iran	Seyed Mohammad Khatami	President of Iran	
Iraq	Tariq Aziz	Deputy prime minister	
Ireland	Bertie Ahern	Taoiseach	
Israel	Ehud Barak	Prime Minister of Israel	
Italy	Giuliano Amato	Prime Minister of Italy	
Jamaica	James Patterson	Head of government	
Japan	Yoshirō Mori	Prime Minister of Japan	
Jordan	Abdullah II of Jordan	Head of state	
Kazakhstan	Nursultan Nazarbayev	President of Kazakhstan	
Kenya	Daniel arap Moi	President of Kenya	
Kiribati	Teburoro Tito	President of Kiribati	
Democratic People's Republic of Korea	Kim Yong Nam	President of the Presidium of the Supreme People's Assembly	Did not attend - see below
Republic of Korea	Kim Dae-jung	President of the Republic of Korea	
Kuwait	Jaber Al-Ahmad Al-Jaber Al-Sabah	Minister	
Kyrgyzstan	Muratbek Imanaliyev	Minister	
Lao People's Democratic Republic	Somsavat Lengsavad	Deputy prime minister	
Latvia	Vaira Vīķe-Freiberga	Head of state	
Lebanon	Sélim Tadmoury	Chairperson of delegation	
Lesotho	Pakalitha Mosisili	Head of government	
Liberia	Monie Captan	Minister	
Libyan Arab Jamahiriya	Abdel Rahman Shalgham	Minister	
Liechtenstein	Mario Frick	Head of Government	
Lithuania	Valdas Adamkus	Head of state	
Luxembourg	Mme. Lydie Polfer	Deputy prime minister	
Macedonia	Boris Trajkovski	Head of state	
Madagascar	Didier Ratsiraka	President of Madagascar	
Malawi	Bakili Muluzi	President of Malawi	
Malaysia	Datuk Seri Syed Hamid Albar	Minister	
Maldives	Maumoon Abdul Gayoom	President of the Maldives	
Mali	Alpha Oumar Konaré	President of Mali	
Malta	Edward Fenech Adami	Head of government	
Marshall Islands	Kessai Note	President of the Marshall Islands	
Mauritania	Maaouya Ould Sid'Ahmed Taya	President of Mauritania	
Mauritius	Anund P. Neewoor	Chairperson of delegation	
Mexico	Ernesto Zedillo	President of the United Mexican States	
Micronesia, Federated States of	Leo A. Falcam	President of the Federated States of Micronesia	
Republic of Moldova	Petru Lucinschi	President of Moldova	
Monaco	Albert II	Crown Prince of Monaco	
Mongolia	Natsagiin Bagabandi	Head of state	
Morocco	Moulay Rachid	Crown Prince of Morocco	
Mozambique	Joaquim Alberto Chissano	President of Mozambique	
Myanmar	Win Aung	Minister	
Namibia	Sam Nujoma	President of Namibia	Co-chair of the Summit
Nauru	Bernard Dowiyogo	President of Nauru	
Nepal	Girija Prasad Koirala	Head of government	
Netherlands	Wim Kok	Prime Minister of the Netherlands	
New Zealand	Helen Clark	Prime Minister of New Zealand	
Nicaragua	Arnoldo Alemán Lacayo	President of Nicaragua	
Niger	Nassirou Sabo	Minister	
Nigeria	Olusegun Obasanjo	President of Nigeria	
Norway	Harald V	King of Norway	
Oman	Faisal bin Ali Al Said	Minister	
Pakistan	Pervez Musharraf	Chief Executive of Pakistan	
Palau	Hersey Kyota	Chairperson of delegation	
Palestinian National Authority	Yasser Arafat	President of the Palestinian National Authority	
Panama	Arturo Vallarino	Vice President of Panama	
Papua New Guinea	Mekere Morauta	Prime Minister of Papua New Guinea	
Paraguay	Julio César Franco	Vice President of Paraguay	
Peru	Alberto Fujimori	President of Peru	
Philippines	Joseph Estrada	President of the Philippines	
Poland	Aleksander Kwaśniewski	President of Poland	
Portugal	António Guterres	Prime Minister of Portugal	
Qatar	Hamad bin Khalifa	Emir of Qatar	
Romania	Emil Constantinescu	President of Romania	
Russian Federation	Vladimir Putin	President of the Russian Federation	
Rwanda	Paul Kagame	President of Rwanda	
Saint Lucia	Kenny Anthony	Head of government	
Saint Kitts and Nevis	Denzil Douglas	Head of government	
Saint Vincent and the Grenadines	Charles Antrobus	Head of state	
Samoa	Tuiloma Neroni Slade	Chairperson of delegation	
San Marino	Maria Domenica Michelotti; Gian Marco Marcucci	Captains Regent of San Marino	
São Tomé and Príncipe	Miguel Trovoada	President of São Tomé and Príncipe	
Saudi Arabia	Abdullah Bin Abdul Aziz Al-Saud	Crown Prince of Saudi Arabia	
Senegal	Abdoulaye Wade	President of Senegal	
Seychelles	Claude Morel	Chairperson of delegation	
Sierra Leone	Ahmad Tejan Kabbah	President of Sierra Leone	
Singapore	Goh Chok Tong	Prime Minister of Singapore	
Slovakia	Mikuláš Dzurinda	Prime Minister of Slovakia	
Slovenia	Milan Kučan	President of Slovenia	
Solomon Islands	Jeremiah Manele	Chairperson of delegation	
Somalia	Abdiqasim Salad Hassan	President of Somalia	
South Africa	Jacob Zuma	Deputy President of South Africa	
Spain	José María Aznar	President of the Government of Spain	
Sri Lanka	Lakshman Kadirgamar	Minister	
Sudan	Omar al-Bashir	President of Sudan	
Suriname	Jules Ajodhia	Vice President of Suriname	
Swaziland	Mswati III	King of Swaziland	
Sweden	Göran Persson	Prime Minister of Sweden	
Switzerland	Adolf Ogi	Highest-ranking official	
Syrian Arab Republic	Farouk Al-Shara'	Minister	
United Republic of Tanzania	Jakaya Mrisho Kikwete	Minister	
Tajikistan	Emomali Rakhmonov	President of Tajikistan	
Thailand	Surin Pitsuwan	Minister of Foreign Affairs of Thailand	
Togo	Gnassingbé Eyadéma	President of Togo	
Tonga	'Ulukalala Lavaka Ata	Head of government	
Trinidad and Tobago	Basdeo Panday	Head of government	
Tunisia	Zine El Abidine Ben Ali	President of Tunisia	
Turkey	Ahmet Necdet Sezer	President of Turkey	
Turkmenistan	Batyr Berdiýew	Foreign Minister of Turkmenistan	
Tuvalu	Ionatana Ionatana	Prime Minister of Tuvalu	
Uganda	Yoweri Kaguta Museveni	President of Uganda	
Ukraine	Leonid Kuchma	President of Ukraine	
United Arab Emirates	Shaikh Hamad bin Mohammed Al Sharqi	Vice President of the United Arab Emirates	
United Kingdom	Tony Blair	Prime Minister of the United Kingdom	
United States	Bill Clinton	President of the United States	Host Country of the Summit
Uruguay	Jorge Batlle Ibáñez	President of Uruguay	
Uzbekistan	Islam Karimov	President of Uzbekistan	
Vanuatu	Barak Sopé	Prime Minister of Vanuatu	
Venezuela	Hugo Chávez	President of Venezuela	
Vietnam	Trần Đức Lương	President of Vietnam	
Yemen	Ali Abdullah Saleh	President of Yemen	
Zambia	Frederick Chiluba	President of Zambia	
Zimbabwe	Robert Mugabe	President of Zimbabwe	
	Kofi Annan	United Nations Secretary-General	

=== Co-chairs as Finland and Namibia ===
The President of Finland Tarja Halonen and the President of Namibia Sam Nujoma co-chaired the Millennium Summit. This was due to the Presidency over the General Assembly of Theo-Ben Gurirab in the fifty-fourth session and that of Harri Holkeri in the fifty-fifth session. Therefore, the Heads of state of Finland and Namibia were chosen to preside over the summit.

=== Delegation of North Korea ===
Kim Yong Nam, Head of state of the Democratic People's Republic of Korea, cancelled his visit to the Millennium Summit after an incident at an airport in Frankfurt, Germany. He and his fellow diplomats were subjected to inspection by American Airlines officials. The diplomats claimed diplomatic immunity, which can free them from any law enforcement while visiting other countries.

=== Delegation of Tuvalu ===
Tuvalu was admitted to the United Nations the day before the Millennium Summit began, on September 5, 2000. This country was accepted as the 189th member of the United Nations, signifying Tuvalu's major development since its independence in 1978.

== See also ==
- List of foreign ministers in 2000
- List of state leaders in 2000
- Millennium Summit
- United Nations member states
