= Konris Maynard =

Konris Maynard, or King Konris (born 8 July 1983) is a Kittitian politician who has served as a Minister in the Cabinet of Saint Kitts and Nevis since August 2022. He is also notable for having won the Saint Kitts and Nevis National Calypso Show four times in succession, the only person to hold this record. Maynard also won a fifth crown, to celebrate the Silver Jubilee of the Independence of Saint Kitts and Nevis.

== Education ==
Konris studied and received a BSc in Electrical and Computer Engineering from the University of the West Indies and an MSc in Electrical & Computer Engineering from the University of Waterloo.

== Political career ==
In the 2015 Saint Kitts and Nevis general election, Maynard was elected to represent the constituency of St Christopher #3 for the Saint Kitts and Nevis Labour Party, beating the former Labour Deputy Prime Minister and incumbent MP Sam Condor who ran for the People's Labour Party (PLP)/Team Unity ticket. In the 2020 Saint Kitts and Nevis general election, Maynard lost his seat to PLP candidate Akilah Byron-Nisbett.

In the snap 2022 general election, he regained his seat from Byron-Nisbett, and Labour won a majority in the National Assembly. Shortly after this, on 15 August 2022, he joined the Drew ministry as Minister of Public Infrastructure and Utilities, Transport, Information, Communication and Technology and Post.

== See also ==
- List of University of Waterloo people
