= Akilah Byron-Nisbett =

Former Minister of Health of Saint Kitts and Nevis

Minister of Health, ICT, Entertainment, Entrepreneurship and Talent Development
- In office June 2020 – August 2022
- Prime Minister: Timothy Harris

Deputy Speaker of the National Assembly
- In office November 2016 – June 2020

Member of Parliament
- In office June 2020 – August 2022
- Preceded by: Konris Maynard
- Succeeded by: Konris Maynard
- Constituency: Saint Christopher #3

Senator
- In office October 2016 – June 2020

Personal details
- Born: Akilah Byron
- Party: People's Labour Party (until 2023)
- Other political affiliations: Team Unity (until 2022)
- Education: University of South Florida; Quinnipiac University

Akilah Byron-Nisbett is a former politician from Saint Kitts and Nevis who served as a cabinet minister from 2020 until 2022, and was also a member of the National Assembly as a Senator from 2016 to 2020 and Member of Parliament for the Saint Christopher #3 constituency from 2020 to 2022. She was affiliated with the People’s Labour Party (PLP) until 2023.

== Early life and career ==
Byron-Nisbett studied and received a BSc degree in Information Systems Management at the University of South Florida and an MSc degree in Computer Information System from Quinnipiac University, Connecticut. Before entering politics, she had experience in finance, having worked in the Eastern Caribbean Central Bank and the St. Kitts-Nevis-Anguilla National Bank Ltd, as well as serving as ICT Director of the Saint Christopher Air and Sea Ports Authority.

== Political career ==
Byron-Nisbett was first appointed to the National Assembly as a Senator in October 2016, and made Deputy Speaker of the National Assembly in November 2016. In March 2017, she became Deputy Leader of the People’s Labour Party (PLP).

In the 2020 Saint Kitts and Nevis general election, she stood as the PLP candidate for the Saint Christopher #3 constituency and was narrowly elected, beating incumbent SKNLP MP Konris Maynard. Shortly after the election in which PLP and its allies in Team Unity again won a majority in parliament, she was appointed by Prime Minister Timothy Harris to serve in the Cabinet as Minister of Health, ICT, Entertainment, Entrepreneurship and Talent Development. She was succeed as Deputy Speaker by newly appointed Senator Bernicia Nisbett. During her time as Minister of Health, she helped lead on the public health response to the COVID-19 pandemic in Saint Kitts and Nevis.

In May 2022, the Team Unity government broke down over disagreements between Prime Minister Harris and the leaders of the other coalition parties, resulting in Harris sacking six Cabinet ministers, dissolving parliament, and calling a snap election. During this time from May until August 2022, Byron-Nisbett remained in the Cabinet and took on additional ministerial responsibilities for Culture. In the snap 2022 general election, she lost her seat to Konris Maynard.

In March 2023, Byron-Nisbett announced she had left the PLP and sent a public letter to the party outlining various disagreements.

== Personal life ==
Byron-Nisbett is married and has children.
