= Dowiyogo =

Dowiyogo is a Nauruan surname. Notable people with the surname include:

- Bernard Dowiyogo (1946–2003), 2nd president of Nauru
- Christine Dowiyogo (1948–2008), First Lady of Nauru
- Valdon Dowiyogo (1968–2016), Nauruan politician
- Wawani Dowiyogo (b. 1989), Nauruan politician
