= Clodumar =

Clodumar is a Nauruan surname. Notable people with the surname include:

- Kinza Clodumar (1945–2021), Nauruan politician
- Vinci Niel Clodumar (born 1951), Nauruan politician
