= Millennium Development Goals =

United Nations international goals for 2015

The Millennium Development Goals were a UN initiative with a time span from 2000 to 2015.

In the United Nations, the Millennium Development Goals (MDGs) were eight goals for international development by the year 2015 created following the Millennium Summit, following the adoption of the United Nations Millennium Declaration. These were based on the OECD DAC International Development Goals agreed by Development Ministers in the "Shaping the 21st Century Strategy". The Sustainable Development Goals (SDGs) succeeded the MDGs in 2016.

All 191 United Nations member states, and at least 22 international organizations, committed to help achieve the following Millennium Development Goals by 2015:

1. To eradicate extreme poverty and hunger
2. To achieve universal primary education
3. To promote gender equality and empower women
4. To reduce child mortality
5. To improve maternal health
6. To combat HIV/AIDS, malaria, and other diseases
7. To ensure environmental sustainability
8. To develop a global partnership for development

Each goal had specific targets, and dates for achieving those targets. The eight goals were measured by 21 targets. To accelerate progress, the G8 finance ministers agreed in June 2005 to provide enough funds to the World Bank, the International Monetary Fund (IMF) and the African Development Bank (AfDB) to cancel $40 to $55 billion in debt owed by members of the heavily indebted poor countries (HIPC) to allow them to redirect resources to programs for improving health and education and for alleviating poverty.

Critics of the MDGs complained of a lack of analysis and justification behind the chosen objectives, and the difficulty or lack of measurements for some goals and uneven progress, among others. Although developed countries' aid for achieving the MDGs rose during the challenge period, more than half went for debt relief and much of the remainder going towards natural disaster relief and military aid, rather than further development.

As of 2013, progress towards the goals was uneven. Some countries achieved many goals, while others were not on track to realize any. A UN conference in September 2010 reviewed progress to date and adopted a global plan to achieve the eight goals by their target date. New commitments targeted women's and children's health, and new initiatives in the worldwide battle against poverty, hunger and disease.

== Background ==
=== Origins ===
Following the end of the Cold War, a series of UN‑led conferences in the 1990s had focused on issues such as children, nutrition, human rights and women, producing commitments for combined international action on those matters. The 1995 World Summit on Social Development produced a Copenhagen Declaration on Social Development with a long and complex list of commitments by global leaders, including many adapted from the outcomes of previous conferences. But international aid levels were falling and, in that same year, the Development Assistance Committee of the OECD set up a reflection process to review the future of development aid. The resulting 1996 report, "Shaping the 21st Century", turned some of the Copenhagen commitments into six monitorable "International Development Goals", which had similar content and form to the eventual MDGs: halving poverty by 2015; universal primary education by 2015; eliminating gender disparity in schools by 2005; reductions in infant, child and maternal mortality by 2015, universal access to reproductive health services by 2015 and adequate national strategies for sustainable development in place everywhere by 2015.

In late 1997, the UN General Assembly envisaged a special Millennium Assembly and forum as a focus for efforts to reform the UN system. A year later, it specifically resolved to hold not only the Millennium Assembly but also a Millennium Summit, and mandated the Secretary-General, Kofi Annan, to come up with proposals for "a number of forward-looking and widely relevant topics", thus opening the possibility of going beyond the institutional questions of UN reform. Annan's report, when published in April 2000 under the title "We the Peoples: The Role of the United Nations in the 21st Century", framed the questions of UN reform within the larger challenges facing the world, the chief of which was identified as "to ensure that globalization becomes a positive force for all the world's people, instead of leaving billions of them behind in squalor". In the report Annan urged the forthcoming Millennium Summit to adopt certain key goals and objectives on many of the issues raised in the Copenhagen summit, other conferences of the 1990s, and the recently published Brahimi Report on international peace and security.

The Millennium Summit and the General Assembly in September 2000 issued a Millennium Declaration echoing the agenda that Annan had set out. This declaration did not specifically mention "Millennium Development Goals", but it does contain the substance – and much of the same wording – as the eventual goals. A process of selecting and refining the Goals from the content of the Declaration continued for some time. A crucial moment here was unification between discussions under the auspices of the United Nations and approaches being followed by the OECD based on "Shaping the 21st Century"; this unification was agreed at a meeting convened by the World Bank in March 2001. In September 2001, Annan presented to the General Assembly a "Road map towards the implementation of the United Nations Millennium Declaration" which did contain a section specifically about "the Millennium Development Goals", enunciating some of them in their eventual wording, and indicating the remaining issues in formulating a definitive set.

=== Human capital, infrastructure and human rights ===
The MDGs emphasized three areas: human capital, infrastructure and human rights (social, economic and political), with the intent of increasing living standards. Human capital objectives include nutrition, healthcare (including child mortality, HIV/AIDS, tuberculosis and malaria, and reproductive health) and education. Infrastructure objectives include access to safe drinking water, energy and modern information/communication technology; increased farm outputs using sustainable practices; transportation; and environment. Human rights objectives include empowering women, reducing violence, increasing political voice, ensuring equal access to public services and increasing security of property rights. The goals were intended to increase an individual's human capabilities and "advance the means to a productive life". The MDGs emphasize that each nation's policies should be tailored to that country's needs; therefore most policy suggestions are general.

== Goals ==
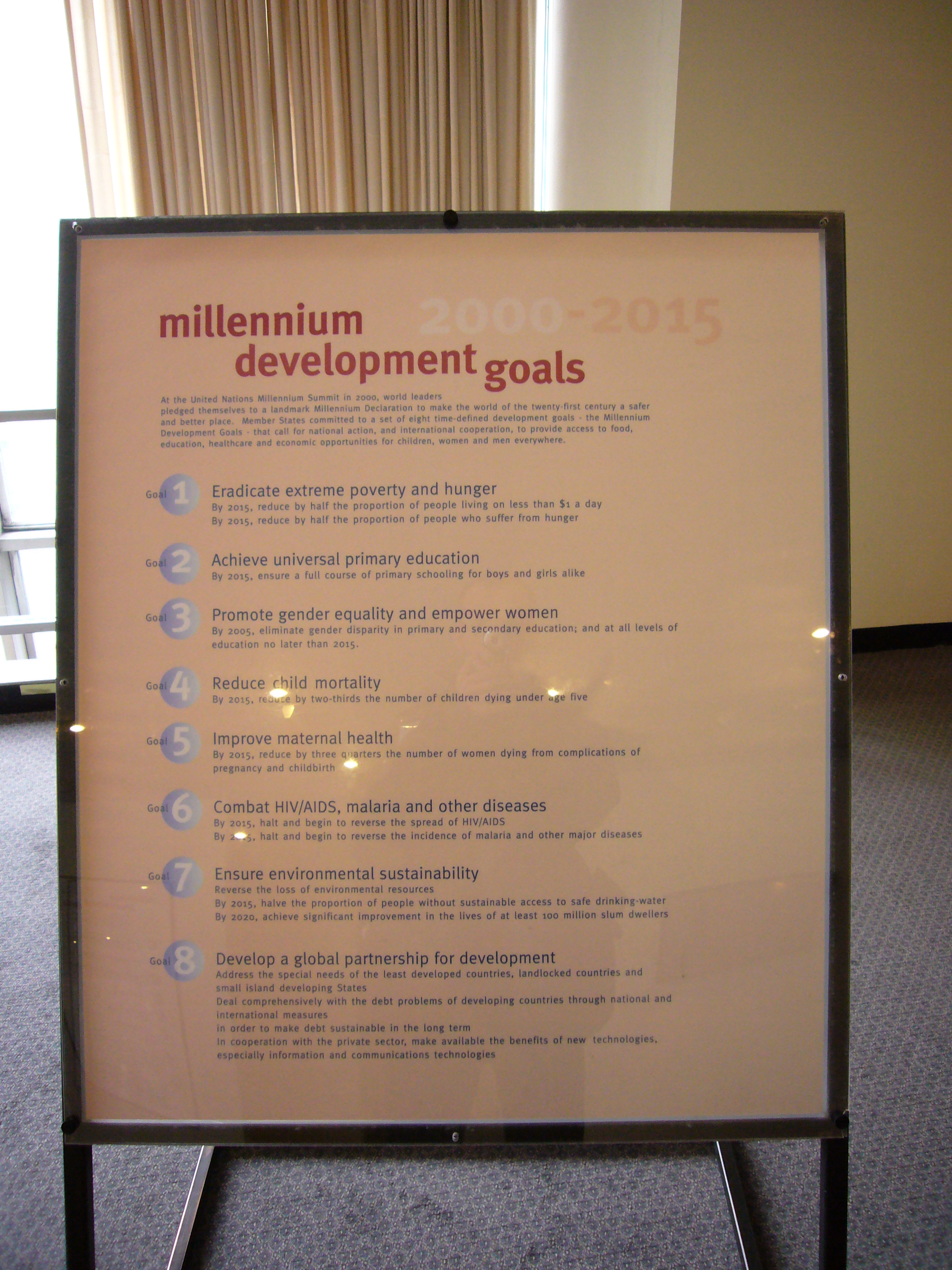
A poster at the United Nations Headquarters in New York City, New York, United States, showing the Millennium Development Goals

The MDGs were developed out of several commitments set forth in the Millennium Declaration, signed in September 2000. There are eight goals with 21 targets, and a series of measurable health indicators and economic indicators for each target.

=== Goal 1: Eradicate extreme poverty and hunger ===
- Target 1A: Halve, between 1990 and 2015, the proportion of people living on less than $1.25 a day
- Target 1B: Achieve Decent Employment for Women, Men, and Young People
- Target 1C: Halve, between 1990 and 2015, the proportion of people who suffer from hunger

=== Goal 2: Achieve universal primary education ===
- Target 2A: By 2015, all children can complete a full course of Primary education/primary schooling, girls and boys

MDG 2 focused on primary education and emphasizes enrollment and completion. In some countries, primary enrollment increased at the expense of achievement levels. In some cases, the emphasis on primary education has negatively affected secondary and post-secondary education.

=== Goal 3: Promote gender equality and empower women ===
- Target 3A: Eliminate gender disparity in primary and secondary education preferably by 2005, and at all levels by 2015

=== Goal 4: Reduce child mortality rates ===
- Target 4A: Reduce by two-thirds, between 1990 and 2015, the under-five mortality rate

Achieving the MDGs does not depend on economic growth alone. In the case of MDG 4, developing countries such as Bangladesh have shown that it is possible to reduce child mortality with only modest growth with inexpensive yet effective interventions, such as measles immunization. Still, government expenditure in many countries is not enough to meet the agreed spending targets.

=== Goal 5: Improve maternal health ===
- Target 5A: Reduce by three-quarters, between 1990 and 2015, the maternal mortality ratio
- Target 5B: Achieve, by 2015, universal access to reproductive health

=== Goal 6: Combat HIV/AIDS, malaria, and other diseases ===
- Target 6A: Have halted by 2015 and begun to reverse the spread of HIV/AIDS
- Target 6B: Achieve, by 2010, universal access to treatment for HIV/AIDS for all those who need it
- Target 6C: Have halted by 2015 and begun to reverse the incidence of malaria and other major diseases

Research on health systems suggests that a "one size fits all" model will not sufficiently respond to the individual healthcare profiles of developing countries; however, a study found a common set of constraints in scaling up international health, including the lack of absorptive capacity, weak health systems, human resource limitations, and high costs. The study argued that the emphasis on coverage obscures the measures required for expanding health care. These measures include political, organizational, and functional dimensions of scaling up, and the need to nurture local organizations.

=== Goal 7: Ensure environmental sustainability ===
- Target 7A: Integrate the principles of sustainable development into country policies and programs; reverse loss of environmental resources
- Target 7B: Reduce biodiversity loss, achieving, by 2010, a significant reduction in the rate of loss
- Target 7C: Halve, by 2015, the proportion of the population without sustainable access to safe drinking water and basic sanitation
- Target 7D: By 2020, to have achieved a significant improvement in the lives of at least 100 million slum-dwellers

=== Goal 8: Develop a global partnership for development ===
- Target 8A: Develop further an open, rule-based, predictable, non-discriminatory trading and financial system
- Target 8B: Address the Special Needs of the Least Developed Countries (LDCs)
- Target 8C: Address the special needs of landlocked developing countries and small island developing States
- Target 8D: Deal comprehensively with the debt problems of developing countries through national and international measures in order to make debt sustainable in the long term
- Target 8E: In co-operation with pharmaceutical companies, provide access to affordable, essential drugs in developing countries
- Target 8F: In co-operation with the private sector, make available the benefits of new technologies, especially information and communications

MDG 8 uniquely focused on donor achievements, rather than development successes. The Commitment to Development Index, published annually by the Center for Global Development in Washington, D.C., is considered the best numerical indicator for MDG 8. It is a more comprehensive measure of donor progress than official development assistance, as it takes into account policies on a number of indicators that affect developing countries such as trade, migration and investment.

== Progress ==
Graph of global population living on under 1, 1.25 and 2 equivalent of 2005 US dollars a day (red) and as a proportion of world population (blue) from 1981 to 2008 based on data from The World Bank

A major conference was held at UN headquarters in New York on 20–22 September 2010 to review progress. The conference concluded with the adoption of a global action plan to accelerate progress towards the eight anti-poverty goals. Major new commitments on women's and children's health, poverty, hunger and disease ensued.

Between 1990 and 2010 the population living on less than $1.25 a day in developing countries halved to 21%, or 1.2 billion people, achieving MDG 1A before the target date, although the biggest decline was in China, which took no notice of the goal. However, the child mortality and maternal mortality are down by less than half. Sanitation (MDG 7) and education (MDG 2) targets will also be missed.

Fundamental issues such as gender, the divide between the humanitarian and development agendas and economic growth will determine whether or not the MDGs are achieved, according to researchers at the Overseas Development Institute (ODI).

Progress towards reaching the goals has been uneven across countries. Brazil achieved many of the goals, while others, such as Benin, are not on track to realize any. The major successful countries include China (whose poverty population declined from 452 million to 278 million) and India. The World Bank estimated that MDG 1A (halving the proportion of people living on less than $1 a day) was achieved in 2008 mainly due to the results from these two countries and East Asia.

In the early 1990s Nepal was one of the world's poorest countries and remains South Asia's poorest country. Doubling health spending and concentrating on its poorest areas halved maternal mortality between 1998 and 2006. Its Multidimensional Poverty Index has seen the largest decreases of any tracked country. Bangladesh has made some of the greatest improvements in infant and maternal mortality ever seen, despite modest income growth.

=== Success factors ===
Scholars identified six factors that have "enabled or hindered MDG implementation" for particular countries: These include path dependencies ("whether the MDGs are in line with the historical political orientation and tradition of a country"), government ownership of the MDGs, pressure from NGOs, availability of financial resources, "administrative capacity and level of economic development", and "support from international or bilateral donors". The researchers found China successful in achieving the MDGs due to its strong administration, economic growth, and effective national strategies, which were well aligned with the MDGs.

=== Multilateral debt reduction ===
G‑8 Finance Ministers met in London in June 2005 in preparation for the Gleneagles Summit in July and agreed to provide enough funds to the World Bank, IMF and the African Development Bank (AfDB) to cancel the remaining HIPC multilateral debt ($40 to $55 billion). Recipients would theoretically re-channel debt payments to health and education.

The Gleaneagles plan became the Multilateral Debt Relief Initiative (MDRI). Countries became eligible once their lending agency confirmed that the countries had continued to maintain the reforms they had implemented.

While the World Bank and AfDB limited MDRI to countries that complete the HIPC program, the IMF's eligibility criteria were slightly less restrictive so as to comply with the IMF's unique "uniform treatment" requirement. Instead of limiting eligibility to HIPC countries, any country with per capita income of $380 or less qualified for debt cancellation. The IMF adopted the $380 threshold because it closely approximated the HIPC threshold.

=== Millennium Development Goal 3 (gender equality) ===
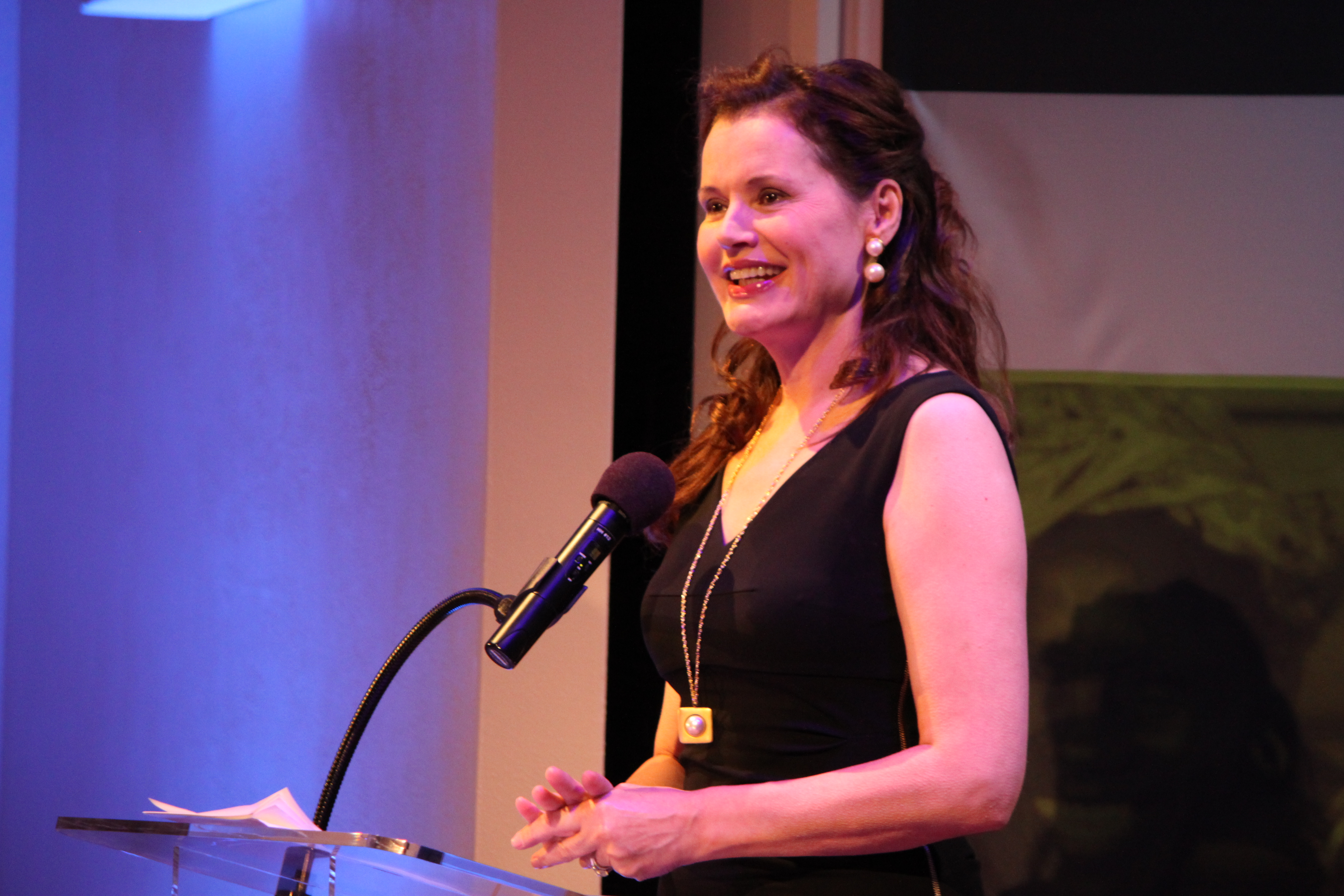
The Hollywood actress Geena Davis in a speech at the MDG Countdown event at the Ford Foundation in New York, addressing gender roles and issues in film such as her organization's work in combating inequality in Hollywood (24 September 2013)

Increased focus on gender issues could accelerate MDG progress, e.g. empowering women through access to paid work could help reduce child mortality. In South Asian countries babies often suffered from low birth weight and high mortality due to limited access to healthcare and maternal malnutrition. Paid work could increase women's access to health care and better nutrition, reducing child mortality. Increasing female education and workforce participation increased these effects. Improved economic opportunities for women also decreased participation in the sex market, which decreased the spread of AIDS, MDG 6A.

Although the resources, technology and knowledge exist to decrease poverty through improving gender equality, the political will is often missing. If donor and developing countries focused on seven "priority areas", great progress could be made towards the MDG. These seven priority areas include: increasing girls' completion of secondary school, guaranteeing sexual and reproductive health rights, improving infrastructure to ease women's and girl's time burdens, guaranteeing women's property rights, reducing gender inequalities in employment, increasing seats held by women in government, and combating violence against women.

It is thought by some women's rights' advocatess that the current MDGs targets do not place enough emphasis on tracking gender inequalities in poverty reduction and employment as there are only gender goals relating to health, education, and political representation. Feminist writers such as Naila Kabeer have argued that in order to encourage women's empowerment and progress towards the MDGs, increased emphasis should be placed on gender mainstreaming development policies and collecting data based on gender.

According to MDG Monitor, the target under MDG 3 "To eliminate gender disparity in primary and secondary education by 2005, and in all levels of education by 2015" was met.

However MDG monitor points out that while parity has been achieved across the developing world, there are regional and national differences favouring girls in some cases and boys in others. In secondary education in "Western Asia, Oceania, and sub-Saharan Africa, girls are still at a disadvantage, while the opposite is true in Latin America and the Caribbean – boys are at a disadvantage." Similarly in tertiary education there are disparities "at the expense of men in Northern Africa, Eastern Asia, and Latin America and the Caribbean" while conversely they are "at the expense of women in Southern Asia and sub-Saharan Africa."

In the context of Mozambique, progress toward Millennium Development Goal 3 has reflected both notable achievements and persistent challenges. The country has made significant gains in increasing girls’ access to primary education and improving women’s political representation, with women holding a substantial share of parliamentary seats in recent years. Nevertheless, gender disparities remain pronounced in rural areas, where poverty, early marriage, and limited access to secondary education continue to affect girls disproportionately. Additionally, women’s participation in the formal labor market remains comparatively low, with many engaged in informal or subsistence activities, limiting economic empowerment and access to social protections. These structural inequalities highlight the ongoing need for targeted policies addressing education, economic inclusion, and gender-based violence in order to sustain progress beyond the MDG framework.

In Zambia, progress toward gender equality has been supported by legal reforms and national policies, including the National Gender Policy and changes to the Marriage Act establishing 18 as the minimum age for marriage. Despite these efforts, disparities persist in education, economic participation, and political representation. Women hold a relatively small proportion of parliamentary seats, and many girls and young women face barriers to completing secondary and tertiary education, which limits opportunities for skilled employment and leadership positions. Additionally, early marriage and gender-based violence remain prevalent, particularly in rural areas, highlighting ongoing social and cultural challenges. Current policies aim to strengthen legal protections, expand access to education and economic opportunities, and promote women’s participation in decision-making processes.

== Funding commitment ==
Over the past 35 years, UN members have repeatedly "commit[ted] 0.7% of rich-countries' gross national income (GNI) to Official Development Assistance". The commitment was first made in 1970 by the UN General Assembly.

The text of the commitment was: "Each economically advanced country will progressively increase its official development assistance to the developing countries and will exert its best efforts to reach a minimum net amount of 0.7 percent of its gross national product at market prices by the middle of the decade."

The attention to well-being other than income helps bring funding to achieving MDGs. Further MDGs prioritize interventions, establish obtainable objectives with useful measurements of progress despite measurement issues and increased the developed world's involvement in worldwide poverty reduction. MDGs include gender and reproductive rights, environmental sustainability, and spread of technology. Prioritizing interventions helps developing countries with limited resources make decisions about allocating their resources. MDGs also strengthen the commitment of developed countries and encourage aid and information sharing. The global commitment to the goals likely increases the likelihood of their success. They note that MDGs are the most broadly supported poverty reduction targets in world history.

The International Health Partnership (IHP+) aimed to accelerate MDG progress by applying international principles for effective aid and development in the health sector. In developing countries, significant funding for health came from external sources requiring governments to coordinate with international development partners. As partner numbers increased variations in funding streams and bureaucratic demands followed. By encouraging support for a single national health strategy, a single monitoring and evaluation framework, and mutual accountability, IHP+ attempted to build confidence between government, civil society, development partners and other health stakeholders.

=== European Union ===
In 2005 the European Union reaffirmed its commitment to the 0.7% aid targets, noting that "four out of the five countries, which exceed the UN target for ODA of 0.7%, of GNI are member states of the European Union". Further, the UN "believe[s] that donors should commit to reaching the long-standing target of 0.7 percent of GNI by 2015".

=== United States ===
However, the United States as well as other nations disputed the Monterrey Consensus that urged "developed countries that have not done so to make concrete efforts towards the target of 0.7% of gross national product (GNP) as ODA to developing countries".

The US consistently opposed setting specific foreign-aid targets since the UN General Assembly first endorsed the 0.7% goal in 1970.

=== OECD ===
Many Organisation for Economic Co-operation and Development (OECD) nations, did not donate 0.7% of their GNI. Some nations' contributions fell far short of 0.7%.

The Australian government committed to providing 0.5% of GNI in International Development Assistance by 2015–2016.

== Criticism ==
=== General ===
General criticisms included a perceived lack of analytical power and justification behind the chosen objectives. Some of the indicator definitions, baselines and targets were changed after their first adoption, to suggest that progress had been better than was really the case.

Further criticism included their "money-metric and donor-centric view", their "unidirectional dimension and narrow focus on developing countries, with industrialized countries being deployed almost as their tutors", the "lack of stakeholder engagement in formulating the MDGs" and the "weak review mechanisms to measure performance".

David Hulme and James Scott noted that the process of creating the MDGs was diffuse, having no single architect and "no clear start or end". They also commented that the process was driven by rich states rather than the countries that would be more the subject of MDG interventions. The entire MDG process has been accused of lacking legitimacy as a result of failure to include, often, the voices of the very participants that the MDGs seek to assist.

The MDGs lacked strong objectives and indicators for within-country equality, despite significant disparities in many developing nations.

The MDGs were attacked for insufficient emphasis on environmental sustainability. Thus, they did not capture all elements needed to achieve the ideals set out in the Millennium Declaration.

=== Human rights ===
The MDGs may under-emphasize local participation and empowerment (other than women's empowerment). FIAN International, a human rights organization focusing on the right to adequate food, contributed to the Post 2015 process by pointing out a lack of: "primacy of human rights; qualifying policy coherence; and of human rights based monitoring and accountability. Without such accountability, no substantial change in national and international policies can be expected."

=== Measurement difficulties ===
A publication from 2005 argued that goals related to maternal mortality, malaria and tuberculosis are impossible to measure and that current UN estimates lack scientific validity or are missing. Household surveys are the primary measure for the health MDGs but may be poor and duplicative measurements that consume limited resources. Furthermore, countries with the highest levels of these conditions typically have the least reliable data collection. The study also argued that without accurate measures, it is impossible to determine the amount of progress, leaving MDGs as little more than a rhetorical call to arms.

MDG proponents such as McArthur and Sachs countered that setting goals is still valid despite measurement difficulties, as they provide a political and operational framework to efforts. With an increase in the quantity and quality of healthcare systems in developing countries, more data could be collected. They asserted that non-health related MDGs were often well measured, and that not all MDGs were made moot by lack of data.

=== Equity ===
Further developments in rethinking strategies and approaches to achieving the MDGs include research by the Overseas Development Institute into the role of equity. Researchers at the ODI argued that progress could be accelerated due to recent breakthroughs in the role equity plays in creating a virtuous circle where rising equity ensures the poor participate in their country's development and creates reductions in poverty and financial stability. Yet equity should not be understood purely as economic, but also as political. Examples abound, including Brazil's cash transfers, Uganda's eliminations of user fees and the subsequent huge increase in visits from the very poorest or else Mauritius's dual-track approach to liberalization (inclusive growth and inclusive development) aiding it on its road into the World Trade Organization. Researchers at the ODI thus propose equity be measured in league tables in order to provide a clearer insight into how MDGs can be achieved more quickly; the ODI is working with partners to put forward league tables at the 2010 MDG review meeting.

== Examples ==
=== Sub-Saharan Africa ===
One success was to strengthen rice production in Sub-Saharan Africa. By the mid‑1990s, rice imports reached nearly $1 billion annually. Farmers had not found suitable rice varieties that produce high yields. New Rice for Africa (NERICA), a high-yielding and well adapted strain, was developed and introduced in areas including Congo Brazzaville, Côte d'Ivoire, the Democratic Republic of the Congo, Guinea, Kenya, Mali, Nigeria, Togo and Uganda. Some 18 varieties of this strain became available, enabling African farmers to produce enough rice to feed their families and have extra to sell.

The region also showed progress towards MDG 2. School fees that included Parent-Teacher Association and community contributions, textbook fees, compulsory uniforms and other charges took up nearly a quarter of a poor family's income and led countries including Burundi, the Democratic Republic of the Congo, Ethiopia, Ghana, Kenya, Malawi, Mozambique, Tanzania, and Uganda to eliminate such fees, increasing enrollment. For instance, in Ghana, public school enrollment in the most deprived districts rose from 4.2 million to 5.4 million between 2004 and 2005. In Kenya, primary school enrollment added 1.2 million in 2003 and by 2004, the number had climbed to 7.2 million.

=== Millennium Villages Project ===
Following the adoption of the Millennium Development Goals (MDGs), in 2000, Jeffrey Sachs of The Earth Institute at Columbia University was among the leading academic scholars and practitioners on the MDGs. He chaired the WHO Commission on Macroeconomics and Health (2000–01), which played a pivotal role in scaling up the financing of health care and disease control in the low-income countries to support MDGs 4, 5, and 6. He worked with UN Secretary-General Kofi Annan in 2000–2001 to design and launch The Global Fund to Fight AIDS, Tuberculosis and Malaria. He also worked with senior officials of the George W. Bush administration to develop the PEPFAR program to fight HIV/AIDS, and the PMI to fight malaria. On behalf of Annan, from 2002 to 2006 he chaired the UN Millennium Project, which was tasked with developing a concrete action plan to achieve the MDGs. The UN General Assembly adopted the key recommendations of the UN Millennium Project at a special session in September 2005.

The Millennium Villages Project, which Sachs directed, operated in more than a dozen African countries and covered more than 500,000 people. The MVP has engendered considerable controversy associated as critics have questioned both the design of the project and claims made for its success. In 2012 The Economist reviewed the project and concluded "the evidence does not yet support the claim that the millennium villages project is making a decisive impact." Critics have pointed to the failure to include suitable controls that would allow an accurate determination of whether the Projects methods were responsible for any observed gains in economic development. A 2012 Lancet paper claiming a 3-fold increase in the rate of decline in childhood mortality was criticized for flawed methodology, and the authors later admitted that the claim was "unwarranted and misleading".

=== Activities and organizations ===
- The United Nations Millennium Campaign was launched to increase support for the Millennium Development Goals. The Millennium Campaign targets intergovernmental, government, civil society organizations and media at global and regional levels.
- The Millennium Promise Alliance, Inc. (or simply the "Millennium Promise") is a U.S.-based non-profit organization founded in 2005 by Jeffrey Sachs and Ray Chambers. Millennium Promise coordinated the Millennium Villages Project in partnership with Columbia's Earth Institute and UNDP; it aimed to demonstrate MDG feasibility through an integrated, community-led approach. The project ran from 2005 to 2015, operating in 15 sites across 11 countries in sub-Saharan Africa.
- The Youth in Action EU Programme "Cartoons in Action" project created animated videos about MDGs, and videos about MDG targets using Arcade C64 videogames.

== Next set of goals (SDGs) ==
Although there have been major advancements and improvements achieving some of the MDGs even before the deadline of 2015, the progress has been uneven between the countries. In 2012 the UN Secretary-General established the "UN System Task Team on the Post-2015 UN Development Agenda", bringing together more than 60 UN agencies and international organizations to focus and work on sustainable development.

At the MDG Summit, UN Member States discussed the Post-2015 Development Agenda and initiated a process of consultations. Civil society organizations also engaged in the post-2015 process, along with academia and other research institutions, including think tanks.

The Sustainable Development Goals (SDGs) are the goals and targets relating to future sustainable development for 2030 once the MDGs expired at the end of 2015.

On 31 July 2012, Secretary-General Ban Ki-moon appointed 26 public and private leaders to advise him on the post-MDG agenda.

In 2014, the UN's Commission on the Status of Women agreed on a document that called for the acceleration of progress towards achieving the Millennium Development Goals, and confirmed the need for a stand-alone goal on gender equality and women's empowerment in post-2015 goals, and for gender equality to underpin all of the post-2015 goals.

== See also ==
- Declaration of Human Duties and Responsibilities
- Seoul Development Consensus
- United Nations Development Programme (UNDP)
- Post-2015 Development Agenda
