= Charles Gomis =

Ivorian diplomat (1941–2021)

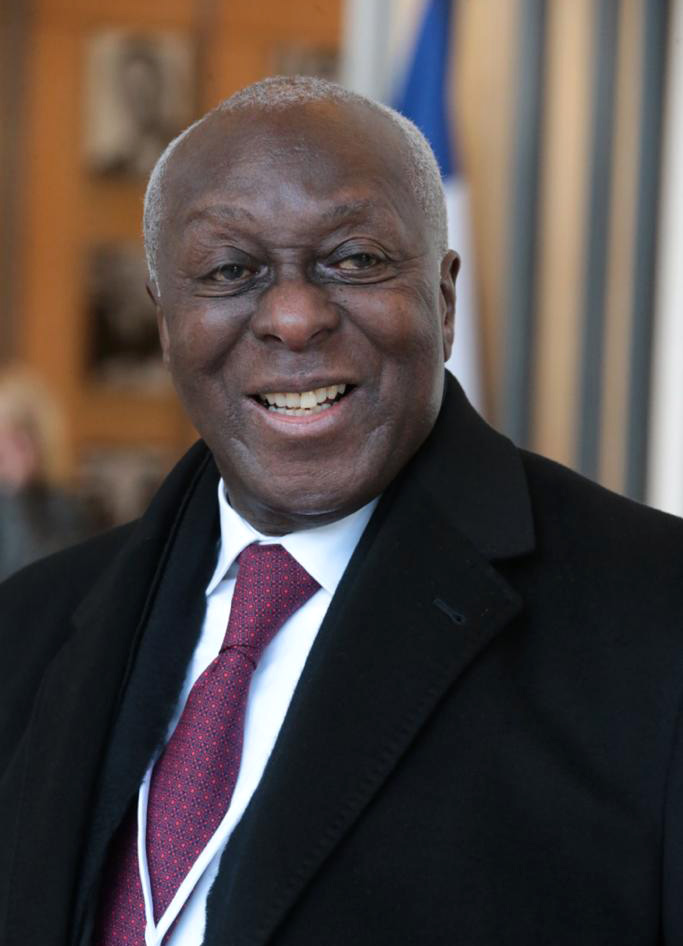
Gomis’ portrait

Charles Providence Gomis (5 February 1941 – 16 July 2021) was a diplomat from the Ivory Coast. He was briefly Minister of Foreign Affairs from March 2000 until October 2000.

== Early life ==
Mr. Gomis was born in Grand Bassam, Ivory Coast, French West Africa. In the early fifties, Charles Gomis studied at the Saint-Charles Institution in Thouars, France. He graduated from the University of California, Los Angeles, with a Bachelors and a Masters degree in Political Science.

== Career ==
Ambassador Charles Gomis was appointed by the President of the Republic Vice-President of the Senate of Cote d'Ivoire in 2020.

He was appointed Ambassador of Côte d’Ivoire in France, Portugal and Monaco from 2013 until 2020, with residence in Paris, France.

In December 2007, Charles Gomis joined SIFCA, a leading African agribusiness group based in Cote d’Ivoire, as Special Advisor to the CEO and Management Team which benefited from his wealth of experience and network following a four-decade career in the public and private sectors, and with international institutions in Africa and worldwide.

Before his tenure at Sifca, Mr. Gomis was a senior official of the United Nations Peacekeeping Mission (MONUC) in the Democratic Republic of Congo from September 2002 to September 2007, as Director of the Political Affairs Division at the MONUC Head Office in Kinshasa and as Director of the MONUC Office in Ituri (Eastern D. R. Congo). Mr. Gomis participated in the complex preparation of the first democratic elections ever held in DRC. From June 1995 to September 2001, Mr. Gomis was Special Advisor to the President of the African Development Bank where he kept the ADB President abreast of political and economic trends and events, and contributed to the design of institutional strategies.

Mr. Gomis also served the government of Cote d’Ivoire as Minister of Foreign Affairs (2000); He was a delegate to the Millennium Summit. He was Cote d’Ivoire Ambassador to the United States, the Bahamas, Mexico (1986 – 1994), Columbia and Brazil (1978 – 1986); Chief of Staff at the Ministry of Economy and Finance (1967 – 1973). While on post in the United States, Ambassador Gomis lead several initiatives to promote business and social partnerships between the United States and Africa including the first African and African-American Summit in Abidjan. During his tenure in Brazil, Ambassador Gomis spearheaded the establishment of several Brazilian companies in Cote d’Ivoire including bi-weekly Varig Airlines flights, representative offices and branches for Banco do Brasil and Banco Real.

Mr. Gomis served on the Board of Directors of several public companies. He was Chairman and Director of SITRAM, Cote d’Ivoire’s first public shipping company (1973 – 1976), and Chairman of the Committee and Commission on Transactions for the Abidjan Stock Exchange (1976). Mr. Gomis holds a Masters of Arts in Political Science from the University of California at Los Angeles (UCLA). He is fluent in English and French, and is conversant in Spanish and Portuguese. He lived in Abidjan with his wife. He had four daughters, Henriette Gomis Billons, Sylvie Gomis Tanoh, Evelyne Gomis Nkontchou, and Camille Alexandra Gomis, and 9 grand-children.

Distinctions include Commandeur de l'Ordre National de Côte d'Ivoire Commandeur Legion d'Honneur de France Recognized by the Congressional Record of the United States Grand-Cruz Ordem Rio Branco (Brazil) Grand-Croix Ordem do Cruzeiro do Sul (Brazil)

== See also ==
- Sidi Tiémoko Touré, current Minister of Animal and Fisheries Resources
