= Bernicia Nisbett =

Former Deputy Speaker of Saint Kitts and Nevis

Bernicia Nisbett is a doctor and former politician from Saint Kitts and Nevis. She formerly served as a Senator and Deputy Speaker of the National Assembly.

== Early life and career ==
Nisbett studied at the Celia Sanchez Manduley University of Medicine in Cuba, and is the district medical officer for the area from Newton Ground to Parsons village.

== Political career ==
In July 2020, Nisbett was appointed as a People's Labour Party (PLP) Senator, and elected to be the Deputy Speaker of the National Assembly. She was also confirmed onto the PLP's party executive in 2021. Following the 2022 election, Latoya Jones from the Concerned Citizens' Movement was elected as Deputy Speaker.
