= Institute of International Relations (Turkmenistan) =

Diplomatic academy in Ashgabat, Turkmenistan

Coordinates: 37.9297°N 58.3912°E

- Türkmenistanyň Daşary Işler Ministrliginiň Halkara Gatnaşyklary Instituty
- Established: 2008
- Affiliations: Ministry of Foreign Affairs (Turkmenistan)
- Rector: Yusupova Gulshat Geldiyevna
- Location: Galkynyş köçesi 25; 744000 Ashgabat; Turkmenistan, Ashgabat, Turkmenistan
- Campus: Urban
- Website: https://www.mfa.gov.tm/en/articles/51

The Institute of International Relations (Turkmen: Halkara Gatnaşyklary Instituty; Russian: Институт международных отношений) is the diplomatic academy of Turkmenistan, which is considered the country's "national school of diplomacy." It was formally created on March 20, 2008, by decree of Turkmenistan's President Gurbanguly Berdimuhamedow.

== Curriculum ==
The institute includes four colleges ("faculties"): international relations, international law, international economic relations, and international journalism. Subordinate to them are six departments: international relations and diplomacy, international and comparative law, international economic relations, theory and practice of journalism, world languages, and social sciences.
