= International Human Solidarity Day =

United Nations annual unity day

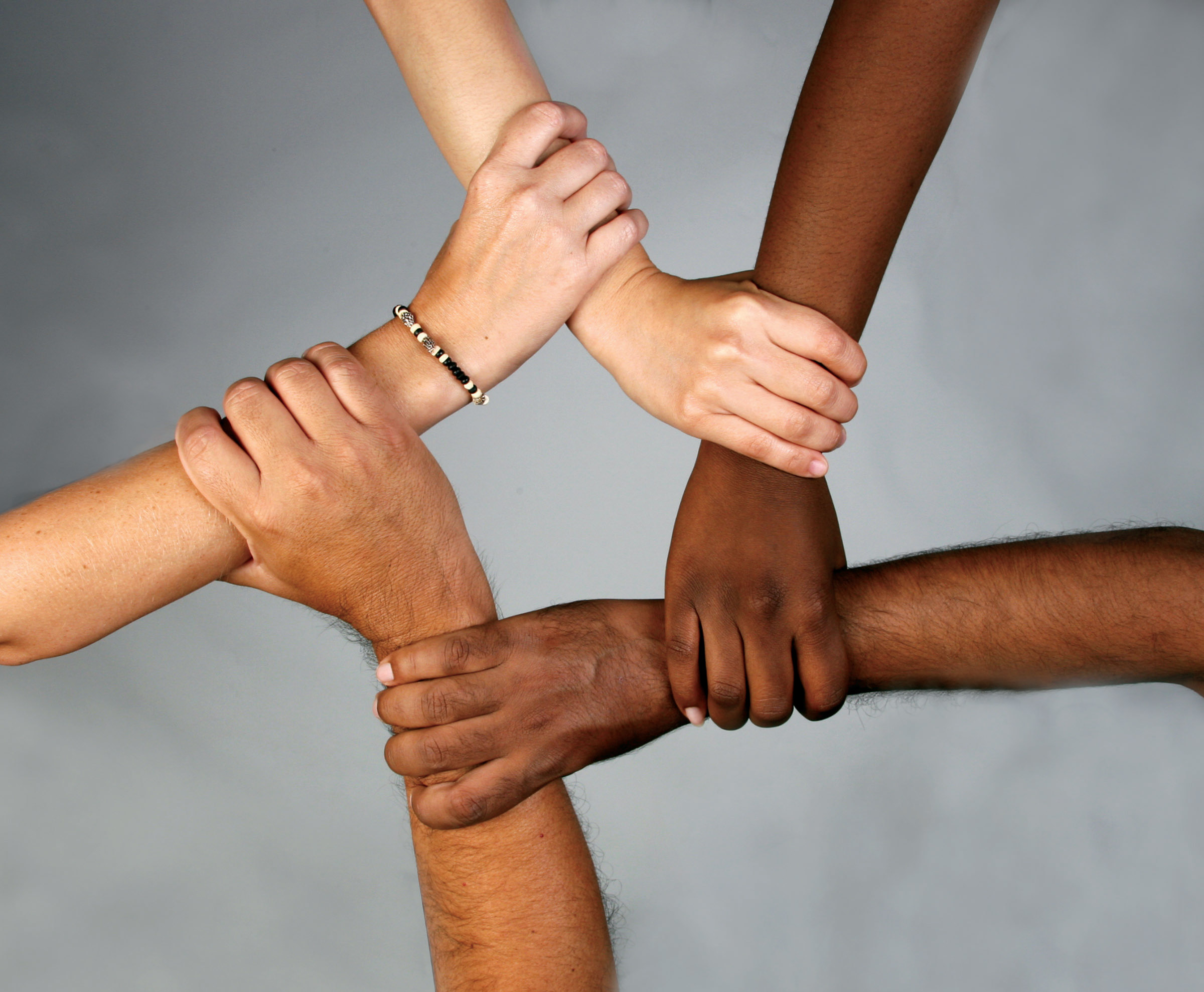
Racially diverse unity

International Human Solidarity Day (IHSD), observed on December 20, is an international annual unity day of the United Nations and its member states. Its main goal is to recognize the universal value of solidarity by making member states aware of global objectives and initiatives to reduce poverty and to formulate and share poverty reduction strategies of independent nations around the world. IHSD is promoted by the World Solidarity Fund and United Nations Development Programme, which are focused on achieving goals set for worldwide poverty eradication. An individual can participate or celebrate the day, either by contributing to education or by helping the poor or physically or mentally disabled. Governments are instead encouraged to respond to poverty and other social barriers through the Sustainable Development Goals.

== Background ==
International Human Solidarity Day was established under the U.N. Millennium Declaration that determines the civil and political rights of an individual in the modern era by establishing foreign relations between the member states and the U.N. It was introduced by the General Assembly during the 2005 World Summit and formally established on December 22, 2005, by resolution 60/209, which recognized solidarity as a fundamental and universal value.

According to the United Nations, International Human Solidarity Day is

- a day to celebrate our unity in diversity;
- a day to remind governments to respect their commitments to international agreements;
- a day to raise public awareness of the importance of solidarity;
- a day to encourage debate on ways to promote solidarity for the achievement of Sustainable Development Goals including poverty eradication;
- a day of action to encourage new initiatives for poverty eradication.
