= United Nations Millennium Forum =

In seeking to contribute to the Millennium Assembly and the Millennium Summit of the United Nations, civil society organizations organized and held the United Nations Millennium Forum on 22–26 May 2000 at United Nations Headquarters in New York.

The Millennium Forum, at which the Secretary-General delivered the keynote address, adopted on 26 May 2000 the Millennium Forum Declaration and Agenda for Action. The Forum's outcome has been issued as an official document of the General Assembly (A/54/959). Moreover, the General Assembly decided that a representative of the Millennium Forum may be included in the list of speakers for the plenary meetings of the Millennium Summit of the United Nations (resolution 54/281).
