= Vinci Niel Clodumar =

Nauruan politician

Minister of Finance of Nauru
- In office September 1993 – June 1994
- President: Bernard Dowiyogo
- Preceded by: Kinza Clodumar
- Succeeded by: Vinson Detenamo

Personal details
- Born: 23 March 1951 (age 75)

Vinci Niel Clodumar (born 23 March 1951) is a Nauruan politician and former ambassador of the Republic of Nauru to the United Nations in New York.

== Career ==
He was Minister of Justice and Border Control in 1989. He was Minister of Finance under Bernard Dowiyogo from September 1993 to June 1994.

In his address to the General Assembly at the 55th General Debate, Clodumar as the head of the Nauru Delegation criticised the Western European and Others Group, and advocated for the creation of a new Oceania regional group to include both Australia and New Zealand, as well as the ASEAN member countries, Japan, the Republic of Korea and the Pacific island countries. In his speech he mentioned that "the 11 Pacific island countries are drowning in the Asian Group, while Australia and New Zealand...are marooned in the Group of Western European and other States."
