= Ministry of Foreign Affairs (Turkmenistan) =

Government ministry of Turkmenistan

Ministry of Foreign Affairs of Turkmenistan
- Türkmenistanyň Daşary Işler Ministirligi

Agency overview
- Formed: 1991
- Jurisdiction: President of Turkmenistan
- Headquarters: 108 Archabil Highway, Ashgabat
- Minister responsible: Raşit Meredow
- Website: www.mfa.gov.tm

The Ministry of Foreign Affairs of Turkmenistan (Türkmenistanyň Daşary Işler Ministirligi, DIM) is the central government institution charged with leading the foreign policy of Turkmenistan. It was established in 1991. The current Foreign Minister is Raşit Meredow.

== Organization ==
In accordance with the law under the jurisdiction of the President of Turkmenistan. Structure and number of employees of the central apparatus of Turkmenistan, as well as diplomatic missions and consular offices of Turkmenistan abroad approved by the president of Turkmenistan.

The structure of the ministry consists of 17 units and 15 divisions, one control and the magazine "Foreign Policy and Diplomacy of Turkmenistan". Tasks, functions and procedures of the structural subdivisions of the central apparatus of the ministry governed by appropriate provisions.

== Office ==
On April 1, 2011, a new building of the ministry was commissioned in Ashgabat. It has the original architecture, the 14-story skyscraper surmounted by a giant globe, which houses rooms for press conferences. In the building there are 118 workers offices and meeting rooms, an auditorium, conference room, and a lounge for international conferences. On the 11th floor there is a viewing terrace with panoramic views of Ashgabat. The building was erected on the Archabil Avenue, which also has offices of other ministries and departments. The building was built by French company Bouygues.

== Ministers of Foreign Affairs ==
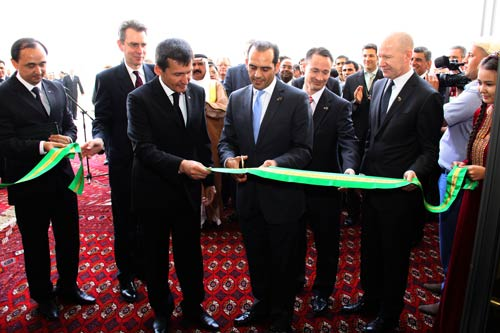
Turkmenistan's Vice President and Foreign Minister Rashid Meredov and U.S. Deputy Assistant Secretary of Commerce Juan Verde cut the ribbon to open an exhibition in 2011.

No.	Image	Name (birth-death)	In office		President	Notes
No.	Image	Name (birth-death)	Took office	Left office	President	Notes
1		Awdy Kulyýew	9 September 1990	4 August 1992	Saparmurat Niyazov (1990-2006)	
2		Halykberdy Atayew	8 April 1992	1 June 1995	Saparmurat Niyazov (1990-2006)	
		Boris Şyhmyradow	6 June 1995	28 July 2000	Saparmurat Niyazov (1990-2006)	
3		Batyr Berdiýew	28 July 2000	7 July 2001	Saparmurat Niyazov (1990-2006)	
4		Raşit Meredow	7 July 2001	Present	Saparmurat Niyazov (1990-2006)	
4		Raşit Meredow	7 July 2001	Present	Gurbanguly Berdimuhamedow (2006-2022)	
4		Raşit Meredow	7 July 2001	Present	Serdar Berdimuhamedow (2022-present)	

== See also ==
- Foreign relations of Turkmenistan
- Institute of International Relations (Turkmenistan)
