= United Nations Millennium Declaration =

United Nations General Assembly resolution adopted in 2000

- Signed: 8 September 2000

Full text
- United Nations Millennium Declaration at Wikisource

On 8 September 2000, following a three-day Millennium Summit of world leaders gathered in New York at the headquarters of the United Nations, the UN General Assembly adopted some 60 goals regarding peace; development; environment; human rights; the vulnerable, hungry, and poor; Africa; and the United Nations which is called Millennium Declaration (Resolution 55/2). A follow-up outcome of the resolution was passed by the General Assembly on 14 December 2000 to guide its implementation. Progress on implementation of the Declaration was reviewed at the 2005 World Summit of leaders. The Declaration includes 8 chapters and 32 paragraphs.

== Chapters ==
The Millennium Declaration has eight chapters and key objectives, adopted by 189 world leaders during the summit: The Declaration, after the Vienna Declaration and Programme of Action, stresses the observance of international human rights law and international humanitarian law under the Principles of United Nations Charter as well as the treaties on sustainable development. The Declaration also urges observance of the Olympic truce individually and collectively.

1. Values and Principles

- Freedom
- Equality
- Solidarity
- Tolerance
- Respect for nature - "Shown in the management of all living species and natural resources, in accordance with the precepts of sustainable development."
- Shared responsibility

2. Peace, Security and Disarmament
3. Development and Poverty Eradication
4. Protecting our Common Environment
5. Human Rights, Democracy and Good Governance
6. Protecting the Vulnerable
7. Meeting the Special Needs of Africa
8. Strengthening the United Nations

== See also ==
- Commission for Social Development
- United Nations
- Millennium Summit
- 2005 World Summit
- International Human Solidarity Day
- Millennium Development Goals
- Vienna Declaration and Programme of Action
- Sustainable Development Goals

== Bibliography ==
- UN (8 September 2000). United Nations Millennium Declaration. 55/2 (PDF). United Nations General Assembly.
