= Clarisse Ratsifandrihamanana =

Malagasy writer

Clarisse Andriamampandry Ratsifandrihamanana (Fénérive-Est, December 5, 1926 – Antananarivo, June 28, 1987) was a Malagasy writer.

She married Dr. Henri Ratsifandrihamanana in 1946, and they had eight children, including Lila Ratsifandrihamanana. She gained seven important literature prizes and was a member of Malagasy Academy and an officer of Legion of Honour. Clarisse Ratsifandrihamanana had started writing when she was very young, but she really devoted herself to literature after her third daughter's death in 1950. Her literature style is very diverse, both in themes and formats.

== Partial bibliography ==
- Ny Zanako, I, II
- Lavakombarika
- Salohy
- Ramose
- Lohataona sy Rririnina
