= Christine Dowiyogo =

First Lady of Nauru

Christina Eidienda Dowiyogo (14 January 1948 – 19 March 2008) was the wife of the former President of Nauru Bernard Dowiyogo and the longest-serving First Lady of Nauru in the country's history.

She married Bernard Dowiyogo in 1968 who served as Nauru's president on seven occasions between 1976 and 2003. President Dowiyogo died in office in 2003, leaving Dowiyogo a widow.

== Family ==
Christina Dowiyogo had eight children, Clara Augusta Alefaio (née Dowiyogo) who served at the Nauru Education Department but now resides in New Zealand, Valdon Kape Dowiyogo, who served as Speaker of the Parliament of Nauru, Jesulenko Dowiyogo, who served as diplomat and later Chairman of the Board of Directors of the Nauru Fisheries and Marine Resources Authority, Junior Dowiyogo who served as the Nauru Police Force Commissioner, Peter Jason Dowiyogo who worked at the Nauru Post Office, David Dowiyogo who is employed at the Republic of Nauru Hospital, Jeff Dowiyogo who currently resides in Australia and Zita Dowiyogo who now serves at the Nauru Immigration Office.

== Death ==
Dowiyogo died on 19 March 2008.
