= Boris Şyhmyradow =

Turkmen politician (born 1949)

Foreign Minister of Turkmenistan
- In office 6 June 1995 – 28 July 2000
- President: Saparmurat Niyazov
- Preceded by: Halykberdy Atayew
- Succeeded by: Batyr Berdiýew

Personal details
- Born: Boris Orazovich Shikhmuradov; 25 May 1949 (age 77) Ashgabat, Turkmen SSR, Soviet Union
- Spouse: Tatyana Shikhmuradova
- Children: 2
- Education: Moscow State University

Boris Orazowiç Şyhmyradow (born 25 May 1949) is a Turkmen politician who served as the minister of foreign affairs of Turkmenistan from 1995 to 2000. He was sentenced to life imprisonment after he was convicted of participation in a plot against President Saparmurat Niyazov in 2002. Little is known about his life in prison, and it is unknown whether he remains alive.

== Biography ==
=== Early life and diplomatic career ===
Şyhmyradow was born in Ashgabat to an Armenian mother and Turkmen father. Beginning in 1971, he worked in the Soviet embassies to Pakistan and India. After Turkmenistan gained independence, in 1992 he became Deputy Foreign Minister and then First Deputy Foreign Minister; he also became Deputy Chairman of the Cabinet of Ministers in the same year. He became Foreign Minister in 1995 and served in that position for five years. He subsequently became a Special Envoy dealing with Caspian Sea affairs and the normalisation of the situation in Afghanistan in June 2000. He served in that post until March 2001, when he became Turkmenistan's Ambassador to the People's Republic of China. He remained in the latter position until November 2001, when he announced his opposition to President Niyazov.

=== Assassination plot ===
Following an alleged assassination attempt against Niyazov on 25 November 2002, Şyhmyradow was accused by the Turkmen government of being behind the attack and plotting a coup. Şyhmyradow was arrested in Ashgabat on 25 December 2002. He had previously been in exile in Russia, but returned to fight the charges against him. It was alleged that, as part of the plot, he had entered Turkmenistan from Uzbekistan prior to the attempt on Niyazov's life, and that, after it failed, he had taken refuge in the Uzbek embassy from 26 November to 7 December. Subsequently, according to Şyhmyradow's confession, he stayed in a friend's apartment until he was captured. This confession was shown on television; in it, he said “We are a criminal gang, a mafia. There is not a single normal person among us. We are all nonentities. I’m not a person who is able to rule the state, but on the contrary, a criminal who can only destroy the state ... While living in Russia, we were involved in drug use and, intoxicated, we recruited mercenaries to commit the terrorist act. Our task was to destabilize the situation in Turkmenistan, undermine the constitutional system and attempt to assassinate the president”, and he also praised Niyazov very highly. Some suspected that torture was used to obtain the confession. Şyhmyradow had met with his lawyer only once before his trial, and the indictment against him was written in Turkmen, which neither Şyhmyradow nor his attorney spoke.

Despite several members of the Assembly of Turkmenistan demanding that Şyhmyradow be shot, President Niyazov stated that the death penalty would not be imposed, as Turkmenistan had abolished it three years earlier. On 30 December, Şyhmyradow was sentenced to 25 years in prison, the maximum possible punishment; however, the People's Council amended the criminal code shortly thereafter to enable life sentences for traitors, and Şyhmyradow's sentence was accordingly changed.

Major Begenç Beknazarow, who is a nephew of Şyhmyradow, was also imprisoned in connection with the attempt on Niyazov's life.

=== Whereabouts ===
Following Niyazov's death in December 2006, his successor, Gurbanguly Berdimuhamedow, was asked about the fates of Şyhmyradow and alleged co-conspirator Batyr Berdiýew at a visit to Columbia University in September 2007. Berdimuhamedow said that he thought they were still alive. He also mentioned the Gadyr Gijesi ("Night of Forgiveness"), an October occasion that is customarily marked by the release of prisoners, leading to speculation that Şyhmyradow might be released. On the occasion, Şyhmyradow's wife and nephew were released on 8 October 2007, but Şyhmyradow himself was not.

Nothing has been heard of Şyhmyradow since 2007; it is thought that he is still imprisoned or that he may have died in prison. According to the other version, Şyhmyradow was secretly executed in the prison located in Türkmenbaşy between April 2003 and November 2005.

In 2014, UN Human Rights Committee found Syhmyradow's rights to life and to fair trial to have been violated.
