= Adalberto Rodríguez Giavarini =

Argentine economist and diplomat

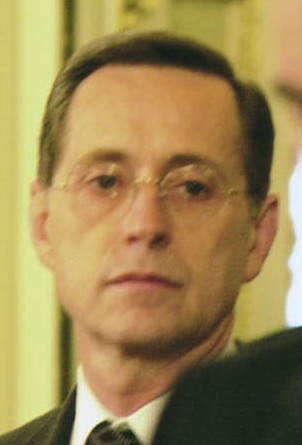
Adalberto Rodríguez Giavarini in 2001

Adalberto Rodríguez Giavarini (born 18 October 1944) is an Argentine economist and diplomat, who served as Minister of Foreign Relations between 1991 and 2001. Also he served in the Argentine Army for several years as Lieutenant.

Between 1995 and 1996 he served as National Deputy. He was very close to politician Fernando de la Rúa, who designated him as Minister of Foreign Relations in his presidency.

He was born in Buenos Aires province. He graduated from University of Buenos Aires in Economy.
