= Fifty-fifth session of the United Nations General Assembly =

- 5 September 2000 – 10 September 2001 55th session 55th general debate
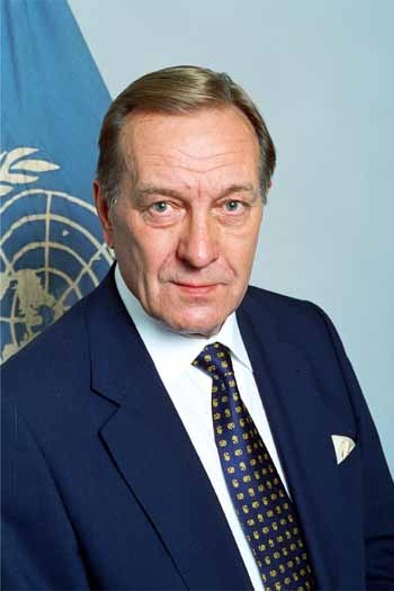
- President of the 55th General Assembly, Harri Holkeri
- Host country: United Nations
- Participants: United Nations Member States
- President: Harri Holkeri
- Secretary-General: Kofi Annan

The fifty-fifth session of the United Nations General Assembly opened on 5 September 2000 at the UN Headquarters in New York City. The president was former Prime Minister of Finland Harri Holkeri.

== Addresses ==
In his address to the assembly, Vinci Niel Clodumar, the head of the Nauru Delegation, criticised the Western European and Others Group and advocated for the creation of a new Oceania regional group to include both Australia and New Zealand, as well as the ASEAN member countries, Japan, South Korea and the Pacific island countries. In his speech he mentioned that "the 11 Pacific island countries are drowning in the Asian Group, while Australia and New Zealand...are marooned in the Group of Western European and other States."

== See also ==
- List of UN General Assembly sessions
- List of General debates of the United Nations General Assembly
- Millennium Summit
