= Lila Ratsifandrihamanana =

Malagasy politician and diplomat

Lila Hanitra Ratsifandrihamanana
- Born: 1959 (age 66–67)
- Citizenship: Madagascar
- Education: Degree in mining engineering and masters degree in geology form st. Petersburg mining institute, Russia. M.sc degree in Administrative science, Diplomacy and international relations from Farleigh Dickson University, USA
- Known for: First female minister for scientific research
- Notable work: Minister of scientific research (1997-1998) Minister of foreign affairs ( 1998-2002) Ambassador of Madagascar to Senegal (2002) Director of liaison office with the United nations in New York ( 2009 ) Permanent representative of the African Union ( 2007)
- Parents: Henni Ratsifandrihamanana (father); Clarisse Andriamampandry Ratsifandrihamanana (mother)

Lila Hanitra Ratsifandrihamanana (born 1959) is a Malagasy politician and diplomat. Ratsifandrihamanana was the Minister of Scientific Research from 1997 to 1998 and Minister of Foreign Affairs from 1998 to 2002. Ratsifandrihamanana resigned on February 27, 2002, amidst the political crisis that followed the December 2001 presidential election, because, according to her spokesperson, "she was personally in favour of comparing reports" regarding the electoral controversy. She then became ambassador to Senegal in 2002. In 2007 she became Permanent Representative of the African Union, Permanent Observer Mission of the African Union to the United Nations in New York. In 2009, she joined the United Nations Food and Agriculture Organization (FAO), as the Director of the Liaison Office with the UN in New York.

== Youth ==
Lila Hanitra Ratsifandrihamanana is the sixth child of Henri Ratsifandrihamanana (1921-1982), a Pediatric Doctor and a fervent political militant of the fight against colonialism, and Clarisse Andriamampandry Ratsifandrihamanana (1926-1987), eminent writer and poet, member of the Malagasy Academia and other national and international literary organizations.

== Studies ==
Lila Hanitra Ratsifandrihamanana holds a M.Sc. degree in Administrative Science, Diplomacy and International Relations from Farleigh Dickinson University, NJ, USA (2010). She also holds a degree in Mining Engineering with specialization in Geophysics and a master's degree of Sciences in Geology from the St. Petersburg Mining Institute, Russia (1985).

== Career ==
Lila Hanitra Ratsifandrihamanana began her professional career in 1986 as Teacher and Researcher at the Higher Teacher Training School of the Antananarivo University, Madagascar. In 1992, she was appointed Senior Teacher in charge of the training of educationalists in Natural Sciences with the École Normale Supérieure in Antananarivo and thereafter became Head of its Centre for Studies and Research in Natural Sciences.

== Political career ==
Engaged in the national political life, Lila Hanitra Ratsifandrihamanana has been the Deputy President of the Party AKFM-FANAVAOZANA and President of the affiliated Women association «FEMMES POUR LE RENOUVEAU ». She was also member of the Association of Malagasy female Ministers and parliamentarians and participated in a number of elections at national, provincial and communal levels.

In February 1997, she was appointed Minister for Scientific Research, becoming at 38 the first female to hold this high ranking position. Among her achievements, is the launching of the series of National Research Events and exhibitions named «Hall de la Recherche Nationale (HARENA)».

In July 1998, she was appointed Minister for Foreign Affairs of the Republic of Madagascar and held this position until February 2002. As the Chief of the Malagasy Diplomacy, Lila Hanitra Ratsifandrihamanana represented Madagascar at various High Level meetings and Conferences of the United Nations, the OAU/African Union, the International Organization of the Francophonie, The Non Aligned Movement, the Group of the 77, and the Least Developed Countries. She was actively involved in the activities of regional organizations such as IOR-ARC, COMESA, and the Indian Ocean Commission (IOC) which she presided over in 2000-2001.

Lila Hanitra Ratsifandrihamanana undertook a number of official visits in more than fifty countries and initiated international meetings and events in Madagascar. During her official visit in China in May 1999, she launched the idea of a Platform of exchange between China and Africa, which became thereafter the Forum on China-Africa Cooperation (FOCAC).

Between 2002 and 2006, she was Ambassador of Madagascar to Senegal, Mali, Burkina Faso, Morocco, Cape Verde, Gambia and Côte d'Ivoire.

In January 2007, she was appointed Ambassador, Permanent Representative and Permanent Observer of the African Union to the United Nations in New York.

From October 2009 to September 2012, she was the Director of the Food and Agriculture Organization, FAO Liaison Office with the United Nations in New York.

== Social activities ==
Lila Hanitra Ratsifandrihamanana is involved in the activities of a number of Organizations, including the NGO «TANY VAO – TERRE NOUVELLE- NEW LAND», as the founding President, the Association “ACCUEIL MADAGASCAR”. She is also member of the Board of the Association “WOMEN, SCIENCES, DEVELOPMENT » and the National Union of the Geologists in Madagascar (UNGM).
