= Nassirou Sabo =

Nigerien politician

Nassirou Sabo is a Nigerien politician. He was appointed as Minister of Economic Promotion in the government named on March 2, 1990. Later, he became the Minister of Foreign Affairs, Cooperation and African Integration in the government of Prime Minister Hama Amadou named on January 5, 2000, serving in that position until he was replaced by Aïchatou Mindaoudou in the next government, named on September 17, 2001. He is a member of the National Movement for the Development of Society (MNSD) and served as the party's Secretary of Economic and Financial Affairs.

Sabo met with Chinese Premier Zhu Rongji on July 26, 2000.
