= Millennium Summit =

2000 United Nations world leaders meeting

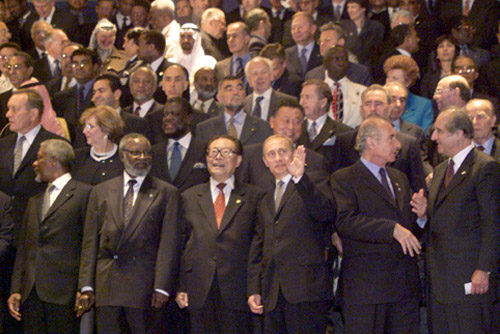
Heads of state at the Summit

The Millennium Summit was the largest modern meeting among world leaders, lasting three days from 6 to 8 September 2000, held at the United Nations headquarters in New York City. Its purpose was to discuss the role of the United Nations at the turn of the 21st century. At the meeting, world leaders ratified the United Nations Millennium Declaration. This meeting was the largest gathering of world leaders in history as of 2000. It was followed five years later by the World Summit, which took place from 14 to 16 September 2005.

== Goals ==
The General Assembly Resolution that decided upon this summit stated that it attempted to seize "a unique and symbolically compelling moment to articulate and affirm an animating vision for the United Nations".

In this summit, 189 member states of the United Nations agreed to help citizens in the world's poorest countries to achieve a better life by 2015. The framework for this progress is outlined in the Millennium Development Goals. Also known as the MDGs, these goals were derived from the Millennium Declaration. This summit was focused on various global issues, such as poverty, AIDS, and how to share the benefits of globalisation more fairly.

== Delegations ==
On 5 September 2000, delegates around the world began to travel to the United States for the Millennium Summit. American airline officials inspected the delegation of North Korea at Frankfurt International Airport during a stop in Germany. American Airlines personnel demanded that the members of the delegation and their belongings be searched. In response to these demands, the North Korean government withdrew its delegation from the summit. As diplomats, the officials should not have been subject to search.

Over 150 world leaders participated in the discussion, including 100 heads of state, 47 heads of government, three crown princes, five vice presidents, three deputy prime ministers, and 8,000 other delegates. The Group of 77 was also present to discuss the changes the United Nations faced at the turn of the 21st century.

== The summit ==
The president of Finland, Tarja Halonen, and the president of Namibia, Sam Nujoma, co-chaired the Millennium Summit. This was due to the presidency over the General Assembly of Theo-Ben Gurirab in the fifty-fourth session and that of Harri Holkeri in the fifty-fifth session. Therefore, the heads of state of Finland and Namibia were chosen to preside over the summit.

Kofi Annan, the secretary-general of the United Nations, opened the Millennium Summit on 6 September 2000. Before moving into the summit, Annan called for a minute's silence for four United Nations workers who were killed in West Timor by pro-Indonesian militiamen. U.S. President Bill Clinton and Russian President Vladimir Putin delivered a plea for world peace and disarmament. Sixty-three other speakers spoke for five minutes each. In the duration of the summit, Bill Clinton held separate meetings with Israel's prime minister, Ehud Barak, and Palestinian leader Yasser Arafat, calling on them to reach a peace agreement between the two nations, although no actual progress was made in doing so. Both sides were still committed to reaching such an agreement, however.

On 7 September, various heads of state discussed peacekeeping issues. They discussed these issues at a round-table meeting of the United Nations Security Council. Seventy speakers were scheduled for this day during the summit, including General Secretary of the Chinese Communist Party Jiang Zemin, South African President Thabo Mbeki, Sri Lankan President Chandrika Kumaratunga, Japanese Prime Minister Yoshiro Mori, and President of Sierra Leone Ahmad Kabbah.

The final day of the Millennium Summit, 8 September, ended after 60 world leaders each gave their five-minute speech. The speakers included Indonesian President Abdurrahman Wahid, Zimbabwean President Robert Mugabe, Nigerian President Olusegun Obasanjo, and Indian Prime Minister Atal Behari Vajpayee.

=== Middle East peace negotiations ===
Israeli Prime Minister Ehud Barak called for Yaser Arafat, the Palestinian leader, to reach an agreement with him. During the summit, Barak stated:

The opportunity for peace in the Middle East is now at hand and must not be missed. Jerusalem, the eternal capital of Israel, now calls for a peace of honour, of courage and of brotherhood. We recognise that Jerusalem is also sacred to Muslims and Christians around the world and cherished by our Palestinian neighbours. A true peace will reflect all these bonds.

Yaser Arafat responded to Ehud Barak's comments by saying the Palestinians had already contributed to the peace efforts by making significant sacrifices towards a compromise between the two countries.

=== Peacekeeping forces ===
Prime Minister of the United Kingdom Tony Blair urged the overhaul of the United Nations' peacekeeping forces. He called for the creation for a military staff to supervise the operations. American President Bill Clinton also stressed the importance of these peacekeeping missions.

=== The Millennium Declaration ===
The world leaders who attended the Millennium Summit adopted the Millennium Declaration, striving to "free all men, women, and children from the abject and dehumanizing conditions of extreme poverty". By the end of the summit, the Millennium Declaration's eight chapters were drafted, from which the Millennium Development Goals, originally developed by the Organisation for Economic Co-operation and Development (OECD), were particularly promoted in the years following the summit. The delegates at this summit agreed on the following eight chapters:

1. Values and Principles
2. Peace, Security and Disarmament
3. Development and Poverty Eradication
4. Protecting Our Common Environment
5. Human Rights, Democracy and Good Governance
6. Protecting the Vulnerable
7. Meeting the Special Needs of Africa
8. Strengthening the United Nations

== Follow-up ==
Additional summits were to be held every five years after the Millennium Summit to assess the progress of the United Nations in reaching towards the Millennium Development Goals. The first follow-up to the Millennium Summit was held in the year of 2005 at the 2005 World Summit.

The United Nations summit for the adoption of the Post-2015 Development Agenda was held from 25 to 27 September 2015, in New York and convened as a high-level plenary meeting of the General Assembly. Delegates proposed 6 themes for Interactive Dialogues:

- Eradicating poverty in all its dimensions and addressing inequality
- Tackling climate change and achieving more sustainable lifestyles
- Building strong, inclusive and resilient economies
- Promoting peaceful societies and strong institutions
- A renewed global partnership and adequate means of implementation
- Reviewing progress on SDG commitments; universality and differentiations

These themes were eventually expressed in the 17 Sustainable Development Goals adopted by General Assembly resolution.

== See also ==
- United Nations Millennium Campaign
- United Nations Millennium Forum
- Working Group on Children and Armed Conflict
