= Marcel Metefara =

Marcel Metefara was the Foreign Minister and la Francophonie of the Central African Republic from February 1999 to 2001.

At the Fifty-fifth session of the United Nations General Assembly, Marcel Metefara said that "a world of peace, progress, and concord summed up the key tenets of the United Nations." He emphasized the importance of reviving interest in the organization and make progress in fulfilling its goals. He also hoped to promote peace settlements and asked the World Trade Organization to provide goods to satisfy the needs of various African countries. He placed precedence on the issues on human rights in a report he submitted to the United Nations Commission on Human Rights.

Marcel Metefara was the head of a committee created for the return of refugees, created by Prime Minister of CAR Martin Ziguélé.

He died in 2009.
