= Aïchatou Mindaoudou =

Nigerien diplomat and politician (born 1959)

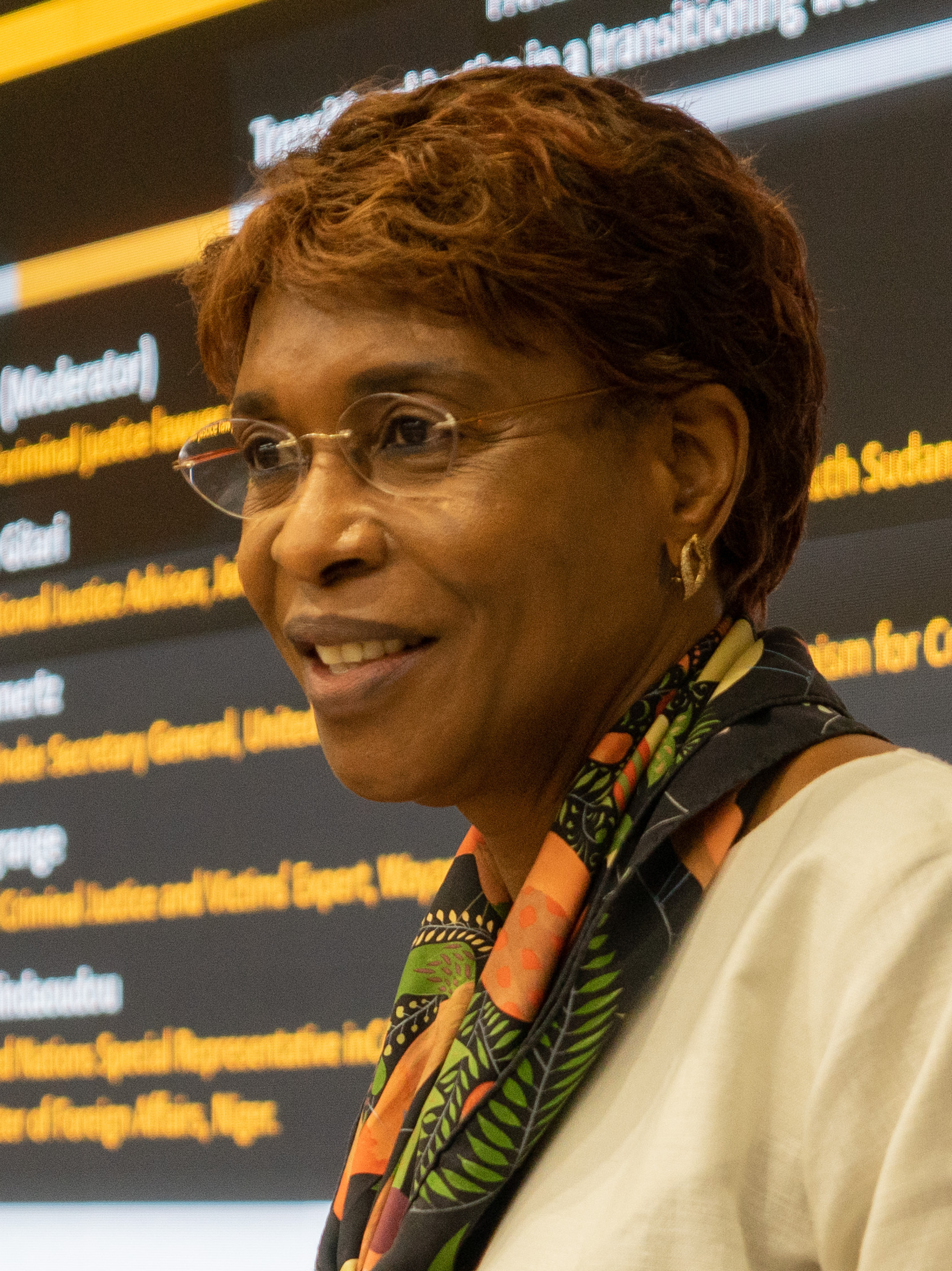
- Aïchatou Mindaoudou, 2023

Special Representative for Côte d'Ivoire and Head of the United Nations Operation in Côte d'Ivoire (UNOCI)
- In office 2013–2017
- Preceded by: (position established)
- Succeeded by: (position abolished)

Deputy Joint Special Representative (Political) in the African Union–United Nations Hybrid Operation in Darfur (UNAMID)
- In office 2011 – 2013 Minister of Foreign Affairs and International Cooperation of Niger
- In office 1999 to 2001 – 2001 to 2010
- President: Mahamadou Tandja

Personal details
- Born: 14 October 1959 (age 66) Niger
- Occupation: Diplomat, Politician

Ms. Aïchatou Mindaoudou Souleymane (born 14 October 1959) is a Nigerien diplomat, an international and constitutional lawyer who served as the United Nations' Special Representative for Côte d'Ivoire and Head of the United Nations Operation in Côte d'Ivoire (UNOCI) from 2013 to 2017. Previously she was Deputy Joint Special Representative (Political) in the African Union and United Nations Hybrid Operation in Darfur Sudan (UNAMID) from 2011 to 2012. From 2012 to 2013 she was the Acting Joint Special Representative and the Acting Joint Chief Mediator in UNAMID.

Ms. Aïchatou Mindaoudou served in the Government of Niger as Minister of Social Development from 1995 to 1996; subsequently she was Minister of Foreign Affairs from 1999 to 2000 and again from 2001 to 2010.

Since 2017, she is a senior independent international consultant and she founded Ipiti Consulting.

== Career in national politics ==
In the first government of Prime Minister Hama Amadou, named on 25 February 1995, Mindaoudou was Minister of Social Development, Population and the Advancement of Women. This government was ousted in a military coup on 27 January 1996.

After another coup in April 1999, Mindaoudou was named Minister of Foreign Affairs and African Integration on 16 April 1999, under the transitional military regime of Daouda Malam Wanké. Although she was not included in the new civilian government named on 5 January 2000, she became Minister of Foreign Affairs, Cooperation and African Integration in the next government, which was named on 17 September 2001.

Mindaoudou remained in the government of Prime Minister Seyni Oumarou, appointed in June 2007, despite President Tandja Mamadou's decision that ministers who had served in the government for over five years should be excluded from the government on this occasion. Mindaoudou was made an exception because it was considered important to maintain continuity in the conduct of foreign affairs.

Mindaoudou's term as foreign minister ended in March 2010 when the transitional cabinet of Mahamadou Danda took office.

== Career with the United Nations ==
Mindaoudou was appointed as Deputy Joint Special Representative (Political) in the African Union–United Nations Hybrid Operation in Darfur (UNAMID) by the United Nations Secretary-General Ban Ki-moon and the Chairperson of the African Union, Jean Ping, on 13 May 2011. Two years later, she was instead appointed by Secretary-General Ban Ki-moon as Special Representative for Côte d'Ivoire and Head of the United Nations Operation in Côte d'Ivoire on 17 May 2013.

In 2020, the World Health Organization (WHO) appointed Mindaoudou as co-chair (alongside Julienne Lusenge) of a seven-person independent commission to investigate claims of sexual exploitation and abuse by aid workers during the 2018 Ebola outbreak in the Democratic Republic of the Congo (DRC).

Diplomatic posts
Preceded by Bert Koenders	UN Secretary-General's Special Representative and Head of ONUCI; 2013–present	Incumbent
