= People's Labour Party (Saint Kitts and Nevis) =

- Leader: Timothy Harris
- Deputy leader: Dameon Lawrence
- Founded: 17 June 2013
- Split from: St Kitts & Nevis Labour Party
- Ideology: Social liberalism
- Political position: Centre to centre-right
- National affiliation: Team Unity (2013–2022)
- National Assembly: 1 / 11

Website
- https://soskn.org/

The People's Labour Party (PLP) is a political party in Saint Kitts and Nevis led by Timothy Harris. Following the 2015 general election in which the PLP only won one seat, Harris became the third Prime Minister of the country due to leading a successful alliance of parties, Team Unity, that together had won a majority. Harris remained prime minister after the 2020 general elections in which Team Unity won an increased majority and the PLP gained a second MP. Following the 2022 snap general elections in which Team Unity had been dissolved and the SKNLP won a majority, the PLP were reduced to one seat and currently sit in opposition.

== History ==
The PLP was established on 17 June 2013 as a breakaway from the Saint Kitts and Nevis Labour Party (SKNLP) by former minister Timothy Harris and former Deputy Prime Minister Sam Condor. Harris had been sacked from the cabinet earlier in the year, whilst Condor had been fired from his position as Head of Government Business, and had later resigned as Deputy Prime Minister. Harris became the party's leader, with Condor becoming its deputy leader.

In September 2013, the party was a founding member of the Team Unity alliance alongside the People's Action Movement and the Concerned Citizens' Movement, with the PLP's Timothy Harris becoming leader of the alliance. At the 2015 general election, the three parties did not field candidates against each other, but competed individually against the Saint Kitts and Nevis Labour Party in Saint Kitts and the Nevis Reformation Party in Nevis. The PLP ran in constituencies 3 and 7 in Saint Kitts, with Harris winning constituency 7 and Condor losing in constituency 3. Following the results in which Team Unity won a majority, with 7 of 11 available seats, the alliance formed a government and Harris became prime minister of Saint Kitts and Nevis. At the 2020 Saint Kitts and Nevis general election, Team Unity further increased their representation to 9 seats and the PLP won a second seat by gaining constituency 3. Harris remained as prime minister following the election.

In 2022, the Harris-led government collapsed due to disagreements by CCM and PAM with Harris, causing the dissolution of Team Unity. In the 2022 snap general election, the PLP ran a full slate of candidates in St Kitts. Timothy Harris was re-elected in constituency 7 but the PLP lost constituency 3 to the SKNLP despite an increase overall in the PLP's national vote share.

At the 2025 PLP National Convention in July 2025, Chairman of the Central Basseterre branch Dameon Lawrence was elected deputy leader of the PLP, with 95% support of party delegates.

== Election results ==
Election	Party leader	Votes	%	Seats	+/–	Position	Status
2015	Timothy Harris	2,723	9.0	1 / 11	▲1	▲5th	Coalition
2020	Timothy Harris	3,731	13.37	2 / 11	▲1	▲3rd	Coalition (2020-2022)
2020	Timothy Harris	3,731	13.37	2 / 11	▲1	▲3rd	Minority (2022)
2022	Timothy Harris	5,036	17.14	1 / 11	▼1	3rd	Opposition
