= Severin Ntahomvukiye =

Burundian politician

Severin Ntahomvukiye (born 1944) is a Burundian politician. He served as foreign minister of Burundi from 1998 - 2001.
