= Sam Condor =

Sam Terrence Condor
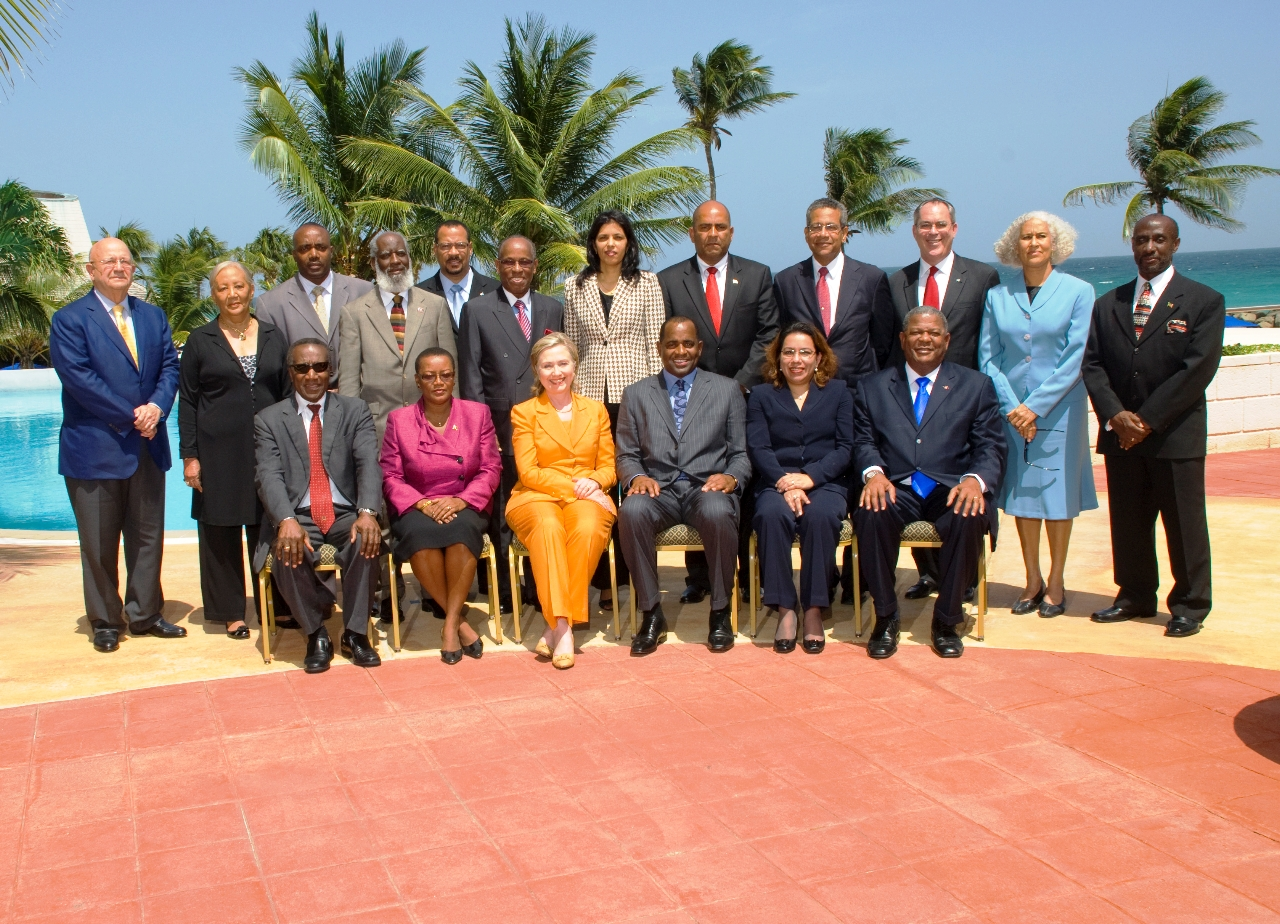
- Condor in 2010, in back row, extreme right

Deputy Prime Minister of Saint Kitts and Nevis
- In office July 1995 – February 2013
- Prime Minister: Denzil Douglas
- Preceded by: Hugh Heyliger
- Succeeded by: Earl Asim Martin

Personal details
- Born: 1949 (age 76–77) Basseterre, Saint Kitts and Nevis
- Party: Labour Party; People's Labour Party 2013-2020
- Education: University of Sussex

Sam Terrence Condor (born in 1949 in Basseterre) is a Kittitian politician and former Deputy Prime Minister of Saint Kitts and Nevis.

Condor has a BA of economics from the University of Sussex. He was a member of the Labour Party, and since it gained power in 1995, he has also served as the Leader of Government Business in the National Assembly of Saint Kitts and Nevis. In the administration of Denzil Douglas, Condor was also the former Minister of National Security, Minister of Foreign Affairs, Minister of Labour, Minister of Immigration and Minister of Social Security. He was Deputy Prime Minister of Saint Kitts and Nevis from 1995 until his resignation in 2013.

On 31 January 2013 Condor resigned as Foreign Minister and left the Government. He later helped establish the People's Labour Party. Contesting constituency 3 on Saint Kitts, he failed to win a seat in the 2015 general elections.

He was appointed as the permanent representative of St Kitts and Nevis to the United Nations in October 2015. In May 2020, he resigned from the position and stated that he no longer supported the PLP-led Team Unity government ahead of the 2020 general election, instead indicating support for the Saint Kitts and Nevis Labour Party. He was succeeded as permanent representative to the UN by Ian Liburd.
