= Batyr Berdiýew =

Turkmen politician (born 1960)

Foreign Minister of Turkmenistan
- In office 28 July 2000 – 7 July 2001
- President: Saparmurat Niyazov
- Preceded by: Boris Şyhmyradow
- Succeeded by: Raşit Meredow

Turkmen Ambassador to Austria, Slovakia, the Czech Republic and the OSCE
- In office 1994–2000

Deputy Foreign Minister
- In office 1992–1994

Personal details
- Born: Batyr Ataýewiç Berdiýew; 3 October 1960 (age 66) Ashkhabad, Turkmen SSR, Soviet Union

Batyr Ataýewiç Berdiýew (born 3 October 1960) is a Turkmen former politician, who served as the foreign minister of Turkmenistan from 2000 to 2001. He also worked as an ambassador.

== Political career ==
From 1990 to 1991, he was a correspondent for the Soyuz and Zhizn newspapers, which are publications of the Foreign Affairs ministry of Soviet Turkmenistan. From 1992 to 1994, he served as deputy foreign minister. From 1994 to 2000, Batyr Berdiýew was the ambassador of Turkmenistan to Austria, the Czech Republic, Slovakia, and the Organization for Security and Co-operation in Europe. From 28 July 2000 to 7 July 2001, Berdiýew served as foreign minister of Turkmenistan, but was dismissed for alcoholism, poor knowledge of the native language Turkmen, a weakness for women, and failure to understand the problems of the Caspian and Aral Seas and Afghanistan. Later, he was replaced by Raşit Meredow at the request of President of Turkmenistan Saparmyrat Nyýazow.

On 8 December 2002, he was arrested for having a connection with an assassination attempt on President Nyýazow. In January 2003, he was convicted of involvement in the assassination attempt and received a sentence of 25-year imprisonment. Opposition members of the assassination reported that Berdiýew was either seriously ill or dead. Nothing has been confirmed, and his death is now regarded as a rumour. In a publication by the Open Society Institute, Berdiýew is listed as an alleged victim of a human rights violation in Turkmenistan by being allegedly tortured while in custody.

Following Nyýazow's death, his successor, Gurbanguly Berdimuhamedow, was asked about the fates of Berdiýew and alleged co-conspirator Boris Şyhmyradow at a visit to Columbia University in September 2007. Berdimuhamedow said that he thought they were still alive.
