= Bernard Dowiyogo =

President of Nauru (1946–2003)

His Excellency Bernard Dowiyogo
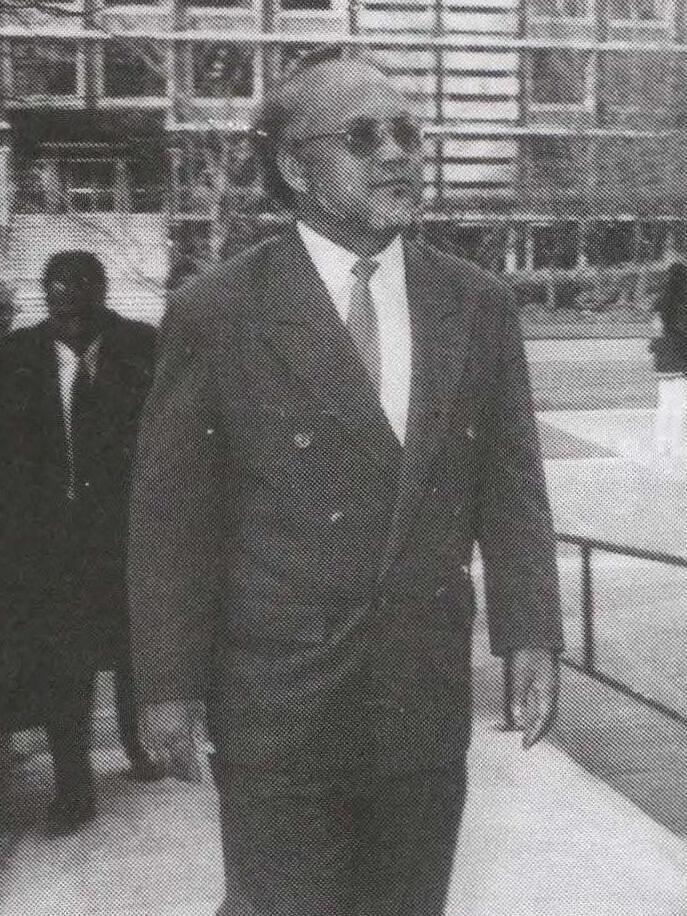
- Dowiyogo in 1995

President of Nauru
- In office December 22, 1976 – April 19, 1978
- Deputy: Kinza Clodumar
- Preceded by: Hammer DeRoburt
- Succeeded by: Lagumot Harris
- In office December 12, 1989 – November 22, 1995
- Deputy: Vinson Detenamo
- Preceded by: Kenos Aroi
- Succeeded by: Lagumot Harris
- In office November 11, 1996 – November 25, 1996
- Deputy: Vinson Detenamo
- Preceded by: Lagumot Harris
- Succeeded by: Kennan Adeang
- In office June 18, 1998 – April 27, 1999
- Deputy: Vinson Detenamo
- Preceded by: Kinza Clodumar
- Succeeded by: René Harris
- In office April 20, 2000 – March 30, 2001
- Deputy: Derog Gioura
- Preceded by: René Harris
- Succeeded by: René Harris
- In office January 9, 2003 – January 17, 2003
- Deputy: Derog Gioura
- Preceded by: René Harris
- Succeeded by: René Harris
- In office January 18, 2003 – March 9, 2003
- Deputy: Derog Gioura
- Preceded by: René Harris
- Succeeded by: Derog Gioura

Member of the Nauruan Parliament for Ubenide
- In office December 17, 1973 – March 9, 2003
- Preceded by: Victor Eoaeo
- Succeeded by: Russell Kun

Personal details
- Born: February 14, 1946 Ubenide, Mandate of Nauru
- Died: March 9, 2003 (aged 57) Washington, D.C., U.S.
- Party: Democratic Party
- Spouse: Christina Dowiyogo
- Children: Valdon Dowiyogo

Bernard Annen Auwen Dowiyogo (14 February 1946 – 9 March 2003) was a Nauruan politician who served as President of Nauru on seven occasions between 1976 and 2003. During this time, he also served as a Member of Parliament for the constituency of Ubenide.

== Background and early career ==
Dowiyogo was born in Nauru on 14 February 1946, to a Japanese father and a I-Kirbati mother. A lawyer by trade, he first became an elected member of Nauru's 18-seat parliament in 1973. Particularly in his earlier years in the Parliament of Nauru Dowiyogo was seen as an opponent of Nauru's first post-independence President, Hammer DeRoburt. Dowiyogo founded the Nauru Institute of Media and Communications which operated between 1984 and 1996 but due to financial difficulties was closed in 1997.

== President of Nauru ==
He served his first term as President from 1976 to 1978 after ousting Hammer DeRoburt. Over the next 25 years, Dowiyogo served as President several times, for periods as long as six years (1989–1995) and as short as 8 days (in January 2003). He was the youngest president in Nauru.

In 1990, Dowiyogo was awarded the New Zealand 1990 Commemoration Medal.

In the 1990s, when phosphate reserves dwindled and the economy was on the cusp of bankruptcy, Nauru controversially turned to offshore banking and passport sales in order to generate income. As a result, Dowiyogo was forced to yield the presidency to Rene Harris after a vote of no confidence at a time when Nauru was at the center of controversy. Dowiyogo eventually closed Nauru's offshore banks in 2003 when the US alleged they were used for money laundering.

=== Death ===
He died in office on March 9, 2003 (having been president on this occasion since January 2003) at George Washington University Hospital in Washington, D.C. from heart complications brought on by his struggle with diabetes, a common ailment on Nauru. At the time of the deterioration of his final illness, he had been engaged in protracted negotiations with the United States Government, having traveled to the United States a few weeks prior before he would be treated at the Washington D.C.-based hospital for his heart ailment.

== Family ==
Dowiyogo married Christina Dowiyogo (died March 2008) on 14 December 1968. They had eight children: Clara Augusta Alefaio (née Dowiyogo) who served at the Nauru education Department but now resides in New Zealand; Valdon Kape Dowiyogo, who served as Speaker of the Parliament of Nauru; Jesaulenko Dowiyogo, who served as diplomat and later Chairman of the Board of Directors of the Nauru Fisheries and Marine Resources Authority; Junior Dowiyogo who served as Commissioner for Police in the Nauru Police Force Peter Jason Dowiyogo who worked at the Nauru Post Office; David Dowiyogo who is employed at the Republic of Nauru Hospital; Jeff Dowiyogo who currently resides in Australia; and Zita Dowiyogo who now serves at the Nauru Immigration Office.

Preceded by Hammer DeRoburt; Kenos Aroi; Lagumot Harris; Kinza Clodumar; René Harris; René Harris; René Harris	President of Nauru; 22 December 1976 – 19 April 1978; 12 December 1989 – 22 November 1995; 11 November 1996 – 26 November 1996; 18 June 1998 – 27 April 1999; 20 April 2000 – 30 March 2001; 9 January 2003 – 17 January 2003; 18 January 2003 – 10 March 2003	Succeeded by Lagumot Harris; Lagumot Harris; Kennan Adeang; René Harris; René Harris; René Harris; Derog Gioura
