= List of foreign ministers in 1992 =

This is a list of foreign ministers in 1992.

== Africa ==
Flag	Country	Foreign minister	Term
(Algeria)	Algeria	Lakhdar Brahimi	1991-1993
(Angola)	Angola	Pedro de Castro van Dúnem; Venâncio da Silva Moura	1989-1992; 1992-1999
(Benin)	Benin	Théodore Holo; Saturnin Soglo	1991-1992; 1992-1993
(Botswana)	Botswana	Gaositwe K.T. Chiepe	1985-1994
(Burkina Faso)	Burkina Faso	Prosper Vokouma; Issa Dominique Konate; Thomas Sanou	1989-1992; 1992; 1992-1994
(Burundi)	Burundi	Cyprien Mbonimpa; Libère Bararunyeretse	1987-1992; 1992-1993
(Cameroon)	Cameroon	Jacques-Roger Booh-Booh; Ferdinand Oyono	1988-1992; 1992-1997
(Cape Verde)	Cape Verde	Jorge Carlos Fonseca	1991-1993
(Central African Republic)	Central African Republic	Laurent Gomina-Pampali; Jean-Marie Bassia	1990-1992; 1992-1993
(Chad)	Chad	Soungui Ahmad; Mahamat Ali Adoum	1990-1992; 1992-1993
(Comoros)	Comoros	Said Hassane Said Hachim	1991-1993
(Republic of the Congo)	Congo	Jean-Blaise Kololo; Dieudonné Ganga; Benjamin Bounkoulou	1991-1992; 1992; 1992-1995
(Djibouti)	Djibouti	Moumin Bahdon Farah	1978-1993
(Egypt)	Egypt	Amr Moussa	1991-2001
(Equatorial Guinea)	Equatorial Guinea	Santiago Eneme Ovono; Benjamín Mba Ekua Mikó	1990-1992; 1992-1993
(Ethiopia)	Ethiopia	Seyoum Mesfin	1991-2010
(Gabon)	Gabon	Pascaline Mferri Bongo	1991-1994
(The Gambia)	The Gambia	Omar Sey	1987-1994
(Ghana)	Ghana	Obed Asamoah	1981-1997
(Guinea)	Guinea	Jean Traoré	1985-1993
(Guinea-Bissau)	Guinea-Bissau	Júlio Semedo; Bernardino Cardoso	1984-1992; 1992-1995
(Ivory Coast)	Ivory Coast	Amara Essy	1990-2000
(Kenya)	Kenya	Wilson Ndolo Ayah	1990-1993
(Lesotho)	Lesotho	Pius Tanki Molapo	1991-1993
(Liberia)	Liberia	Gabriel Bacchus Matthews	1990-1993
(Libya)	Libya	Ibrahim al-Bishari; Umar Mustafa al-Muntasir	1990-1992; 1992-2000
(Madagascar)	Madagascar	Césaire Rabenoro	1991-1993
(Malawi)	Malawi	Hastings Banda	1964-1993
(Mali)	Mali	Souleymane Sidibe; Mohamed Aloussine Touré	1991-1992; 1992-1993
(Mauritania)	Mauritania	Hasni Ould Didi; Ismael Ould Yahi; Mohamed Abderahmane Ould Moine	1990-1992; 1992; 1992-1994
(Mauritius)	Mauritius	Paul Bérenger	1991-1993
(Morocco)	Morocco	Abdellatif Filali	1985-1999
(Mozambique)	Mozambique	Pascoal Mocumbi	1987-1994
(Namibia)	Namibia	Theo-Ben Gurirab	1990-2002
(Niger)	Niger	Hassan Hamidou	1991-1993
(Nigeria)	Nigeria	Ike Nwachukwu	1990-1993
(Rwanda)	Rwanda	Casimir Bizimungu; Boniface Ngulinzira	1989-1992; 1992-1993
(São Tomé and Príncipe)	São Tomé and Príncipe	Alda Bandeira	1991-1993
(Senegal)	Senegal	Djibo Leyti Kâ	1991-1993
(Seychelles)	Seychelles	Danielle de St. Jorre	1989-1997
(Sierra Leone)	Sierra Leone	Abdul Karim Koroma; Ahmed Ramadan Dumbuya; Mohamed Lamin Kamara	1985-1992; 1992; 1992-1993
(Somalia) (Somaliland)	Somalia Somaliland	Muhammad Ali Hamoud Yusuf Ali Guray Sheikh Madar	1991-1992? 1991-1993
(South Africa)	South Africa	Pik Botha	1977-1994
(Sudan)	Sudan	Ali Sahloul	1989-1993
(Eswatini)	Swaziland	Sir George Mbikwakhe Mamba	1987-1993
(Tanzania)	Tanzania	Ahmed Hassan Diria	1990-1993
(Togo)	Togo	Aboudou Tchiaka; Fambaré Ouattara Natchaba	1991-1992; 1992-1994
(Tunisia)	Tunisia	Habib Ben Yahia	1991-1997
(Uganda)	Uganda	Paul Ssemogerere	1988-1994
(Sahrawi Arab Democratic Republic)	Western Sahara	Mohamed Salem Ould Salek	1988-1995
(Zaire)	Zaire	Bagbeni Adeito Nzengeya; Pierre Lumbi	1991-1992; 1992-1993
(Zambia)	Zambia	Vernon Mwaanga	1991-1994
(Zimbabwe)	Zimbabwe	Nathan Shamuyarira	1987-1995

== Asia ==
Flag	Country	Foreign minister	Term
	Afghanistan	Abdul Wakil; Sayed Solaiman Gilani	1986-1992; 1992-1993
(Armenia)	Armenia	Raffi Hovannisian; Arman Kirakossian	1991-1992; 1992-1993
(Azerbaijan)	Azerbaijan	Huseynagha Sadigov; Tofig Gasimov	1988-1992; 1992-1993
(Bahrain)	Bahrain	Sheikh Muhammad ibn Mubarak ibn Hamad Al Khalifah	1971-2005
(Bangladesh)	Bangladesh	A.S.M. Mostafizur Rahman	1991-1996
(Bhutan)	Bhutan	Dawa Tsering	1972-1998
(Brunei)	Brunei	Pengiran Muda Mohamed Bolkiah	1984–2015
(Cambodia)	Cambodia	Hor Namhong	1990-1993
(China)	China (People's Republic)	Qian Qichen	1988-1998
(Georgia (country))	Georgia	Murman Omanidze; Aleksandre Chikvaidze	1991-1992; 1992-1995
(India)	India	Madhav Singh Solanki; P. V. Narasimha Rao	1991-1992; 1992-1993
(Indonesia)	Indonesia	Ali Alatas	1988-1999
(Iran)	Iran	Ali Akbar Velayati	1981-1997
(Iraq)	Iraq	Ahmad Husayn Khudayir as-Samarrai; Muhammad Saeed al-Sahhaf	1991-1992; 1992-2001
(Israel)	Israel	David Levy; Shimon Peres	1990-1992; 1992-1995
(Japan)	Japan	Michio Watanabe	1991-1993
(Jordan)	Jordan	Kamel Abu Jaber	1991-1994
(Kazakhstan)	Kazakhstan	Tuleutai Suleimenov	1991-1994
(North Korea)	North Korea	Kim Yong-nam	1983-1998
(South Korea)	South Korea	Yi Sang-ok	1990-1993
(Kuwait)	Kuwait	Sheikh Sabah Al-Ahmad Al-Jaber Al-Sabah	1978-2003
(Kyrgyzstan)	Kyrgyzstan	Muratbek Imanaliyev; Roza Otunbayeva; Marat Saralinov; Ednan Karabayev	1991-1992; 1992; 1992; 1992-1993
(Laos)	Laos	Phoune Sipraseuth	1975-1993
(Lebanon)	Lebanon	Farès Boueiz; Nasri Maalouf; Farès Boueiz	1990-1992; 1992; 1992-1998
(Malaysia)	Malaysia	Abdullah Ahmad Badawi	1991-1999
(Maldives)	Maldives	Fathulla Jameel	1978-2005
(Mongolia)	Mongolia	Tserenpiliyn Gombosüren	1988-1996
(Myanmar)	Myanmar (Burma)	Ohn Gyaw	1991-1998
(Nepal)	Nepal	Girija Prasad Koirala	1991-1994
(Oman)	Oman	Yusuf bin Alawi bin Abdullah	1982–2020
(Pakistan)	Pakistan	Siddiq Khan Kanju	1991-1993
(Philippines)	Philippines	Raul Manglapus; Roberto Romulo	1987-1992; 1992-1995
(Qatar)	Qatar	Mubarak Ali al-Khater; Sheikh Hamad bin Jassim bin Jaber Al Thani	1990-1992; 1992-2013
(Saudi Arabia)	Saudi Arabia	Prince Saud bin Faisal bin Abdulaziz Al Saud	1975–2015
(Singapore)	Singapore	Wong Kan Seng	1988-1994
(Sri Lanka)	Sri Lanka	Harold Herath	1990-1993
(Syria)	Syria	Farouk al-Sharaa	1984-2006
(Taiwan)	Taiwan (Republic of China)	Fredrick Chien	1990-1996
(Tajikistan)	Tajikistan	Khudoberdy Kholiknazarov; Rashid Alimov	1992; 1992-1994
(Thailand)	Thailand	Arsa Sarasin; Pongpol Adireksarn; Arsa Sarasin; Prasong Soonsiri	1991-1992; 1992; 1992; 1992-1994
(Turkey)	Turkey	Hikmet Çetin	1991-1994
(Turkmenistan)	Turkmenistan	Awdy Kulyýew; Halykberdi Ataýew	1990-1992; 1992-1993
(United Arab Emirates)	United Arab Emirates	Rashid Abdullah Al Nuaimi	1980-2006
(Uzbekistan)	Uzbekistan	Shahlo Mahmudova; Ubaidulla Abdurazzakov	1991-1992; 1992-1993
(Vietnam)	Vietnam	Nguyễn Mạnh Cầm	1991-2000
(Yemen)	Yemen	Abd Al-Karim Al-Iryani	1990-1993

== Australia and Oceania ==
Flag	Country	Foreign minister	Term
(Australia)	Australia	Gareth Evans	1988-1996
(Fiji)	Fiji	Ratu Sir Kamisese Mara; Filipe Bole	1988-1992; 1992-1994
(Kiribati)	Kiribati	Teatao Teannaki	1991-1994
(Marshall Islands)	Marshall Islands	Tom Kijiner	1988-1994
(Federated States of Micronesia)	Micronesia	Resio S. Moses	1991-1996
(Nauru)	Nauru	Bernard Dowiyogo	1989-1995
(New Zealand) (Cook Islands)	New Zealand Cook Islands	Don McKinnon Inatio Akaruru	1990-1999 1989-1999
(Papua New Guinea)	Papua New Guinea	Sir Michael Somare; John Kaputin	1988-1992; 1992-1994
(Solomon Islands)	Solomon Islands	Sir Peter Kenilorea	1990-1993
(Tonga)	Tonga	Prince Tupouto'a Tungi	1979-1998
(Tuvalu)	Tuvalu	Bikenibeu Paeniu	1989-1993
(Vanuatu)	Vanuatu	Serge Vohor	1991-1993
(Samoa)	Western Samoa	Tofilau Eti Alesana	1988-1998

== Europe ==
Flag	Country	Foreign minister	Term
(Albania)	Albania	Ilir Boçka; Alfred Serreqi	1991-1992; 1992-1996
(Austria)	Austria	Alois Mock	1987-1995
(Belarus)	Belarus	Petr Krauchenka	1990-1994
(Belgium) (Brussels) (Flanders) (Wallonia)	Belgium Brussels-Capital Region Flanders Wallonia	Mark Eyskens; Willy Claes Jos Chabert Luc Van den Brande Albert Liénard; Guy Spitaels	1989-1992; 1992-1994 1989-1999 1992-1999 1988-1992; 1992-1994
(Bosnia and Herzegovina) (Republika Srpska)	Bosnia and Herzegovina Republika Srpska	Haris Silajdžić Aleksa Buha	1990-1993 1992-1998
(Bulgaria)	Bulgaria	Stoyan Ganev	1991-1993
(Croatia)	Croatia	Zvonimir Šeparović; Zdenko Škrabalo	1991-1992; 1992-1993
(Cyprus) (Northern Cyprus)	Cyprus Northern Cyprus	Georgios Iacovou Kenan Atakol	1983-1993 1985-1993
(Czechoslovakia)	Czechoslovakia	Jiří Dienstbier; Jozef Moravčík	1989-1992; 1992
(Denmark)	Denmark	Uffe Ellemann-Jensen	1982-1993
(Estonia)	Estonia	Lennart Meri; Jaan Manitski; Trivimi Velliste	1990-1992; 1992; 1992-1994
(Finland)	Finland	Paavo Väyrynen	1991-1993
(France)	France	Roland Dumas	1988-1993
(Germany)	Germany	Hans-Dietrich Genscher; Klaus Kinkel	1982-1992; 1992-1998
(Greece)	Greece	Antonis Samaras; Konstantinos Mitsotakis; Michalis Papakonstantinou	1990-1992; 1992; 1992-1993
(Hungary)	Hungary	Géza Jeszenszky	1990-1994
(Iceland)	Iceland	Jón Baldvin Hannibalsson	1988-1995
(Republic of Ireland)	Ireland	Gerry Collins; David Andrews	1989-1992; 1992-1993
(Italy)	Italy	Gianni De Michelis; Vincenzo Scotti; Giuliano Amato; Emilio Colombo	1989-1992; 1992; 1992; 1992-1993
(Latvia)	Latvia	Jānis Jurkāns; Georgs Andrejevs	1990-1992; 1992-1994
(Liechtenstein)	Liechtenstein	Hans Brunhart	1978-1993
(Lithuania)	Lithuania	Algirdas Saudargas; Povilas Gylys	1990-1992; 1992-1996
(Luxembourg)	Luxembourg	Jacques Poos	1984-1999
(North Macedonia)	Republic of Macedonia	Denko Maleski	1991-1993
(Malta)	Malta	Guido de Marco	1989-1996
(Moldova)	Moldova	Nicolae Țâu	1991-1993
(Netherlands)	Netherlands	Hans van den Broek	1982-1993
(Norway)	Norway	Thorvald Stoltenberg	1990-1993
(Poland)	Poland	Krzysztof Skubiszewski	1989-1993
(Portugal)	Portugal	João de Deus Pinheiro; José Manuel Barroso	1987-1992 1992-1995
(Romania)	Romania	Adrian Năstase; Teodor Meleşcanu	1990-1992; 1992-1996
(Russia) (Chechen Republic of Ichkeria)	Russia Chechnya	Andrey Kozyrev Shamil Benno; Shamseddin Yusef	1990-1996 1991-1992; 1992-1996
(San Marino)	San Marino	Gabriele Gatti	1986-2002
(Slovenia)	Slovenia	Dimitrij Rupel	1990-1993
(Spain)	Spain	Francisco Fernández Ordóñez; Javier Solana	1985-1992; 1992-1995
(Sweden)	Sweden	Margaretha af Ugglas	1991-1994
(Switzerland)	Switzerland	René Felber	1988-1993
(Ukraine)	Ukraine	Anatoliy Zlenko	1990-1994
(United Kingdom)	United Kingdom	Douglas Hurd	1989-1995
(Vatican City)	Vatican City	Archbishop Jean-Louis Tauran	1990-2003
(Federal Republic of Yugoslavia) (Socialist Republic of Montenegro) (Serbia)	Yugoslavia Montenegro Serbia	Milivoje Maksić (acting); Vladislav Jovanović; Ilija Đukić Nikola Samardžić; Miodrag Lekić Vladislav Jovanović	1991-1992; 1992; 1992-1993 1991-1992; 1992-1995 1991-1993

== North America and the Caribbean ==
Flag	Country	Foreign minister	Term
(Antigua and Barbuda)	Antigua and Barbuda	Lester Bird	1991-2004
(The Bahamas)	The Bahamas	Clement T. Maynard; Orville Turnquest	1984-1992; 1992-1994
(Barbados)	Barbados	Maurice King	1989-1993
(Belize)	Belize	Said Musa	1989-1993
(Canada) (Quebec)	Canada Quebec	Barbara McDougall John Ciaccia	1991-1993 1989-1994
(Costa Rica)	Costa Rica	Bernd H. Niehaus Quesada	1990-1994
(Cuba)	Cuba	Isidoro Malmierca Peoli; Ricardo Alarcón	1976-1992; 1992-1993
(Dominica)	Dominica	Brian George Keith Alleyne	1990-1995
(Dominican Republic)	Dominican Republic	Juan Aristides Taveras Guzmán	1991-1994
(El Salvador)	El Salvador	José Manuel Pacas Castro	1989-1994
(Grenada)	Grenada	Nicholas Brathwaite; Dennis Noel; Nicholas Brathwaite	1991-1992; 1992; 1992-1995
(Guatemala)	Guatemala	Gonzalo Menéndez Park	1991-1993
(Haiti)	Haiti	Jean-Robert Simonise; François Benoît	1991-1992; 1992-1993
(Honduras)	Honduras	Mario Carías Zapata	1990-1994
(Jamaica)	Jamaica	David Coore	1989-1993
(Mexico)	Mexico	Fernando Solana	1988-1993
(Nicaragua)	Nicaragua	Enrique Dreyfus; Ernesto Leal	1990-1992; 1992-1997
(Panama)	Panama	Julio Linares	1989-1993
(Puerto Rico)	Puerto Rico	Antonio Colorado; Salvador M. Padilla Escabi	1990–1992; 1992–1993
(Saint Kitts and Nevis)	Saint Kitts and Nevis	Kennedy Simmonds	1983-1995
(Saint Lucia)	Saint Lucia	Neville Cenac; George Mallet	1987-1992; 1992-1996
(Saint Vincent and the Grenadines)	Saint Vincent and the Grenadines	James Fitz-Allen Mitchell; Herbert Young	1984-1992; 1992-1994
(Trinidad and Tobago)	Trinidad and Tobago	Ralph Maraj	1991-1995
(United States)	United States	James Baker; Lawrence Eagleburger	1989-1992; 1992-1993

== South America ==
Flag	Country	Foreign minister	Term
(Argentina)	Argentina	Guido di Tella	1991-1999
(Bolivia)	Bolivia	Carlos Iturralde Ballivián; Ronald MacLean Abaroa	1989-1992; 1992-1993
(Brazil)	Brazil	Francisco Rezek; Celso Lafer; Fernando Henrique Cardoso	1990-1992; 1992; 1992-1993
(Chile)	Chile	Enrique Silva Cimma	1990-1994
(Colombia)	Colombia	Noemí Sanín	1991-1994
(Ecuador)	Ecuador	Diego Cordovez Zegers; Diego Paredes Peña	1988-1992; 1992-1994
(Guyana)	Guyana	Desmond Hoyte; Clement Rohee	1990-1992; 1992-2001
(Paraguay)	Paraguay	Alexis Frutos Vaesken	1990-1993
(Peru)	Peru	Augusto Blacker Miller; Óscar de la Puente Raygada	1991-1992; 1992-1993
(Suriname)	Suriname	Subhas Mungra	1991-1996
(Uruguay)	Uruguay	Héctor Gros Espiell	1990-1993
(Venezuela)	Venezuela	Reinaldo Figueredo; Humberto Calderón Berti; Fernando Ochoa Antich	1989-1992; 1992; 1992-1994
