= Vehicle registration plates of Ivory Coast =

Republic of Ivory Coast
- Country: Ivory Coast
- Country code: CI

Current series
- Size: 520 mm × 110 mm 20.5 in × 4.3 in
- Serial format: AB123CD
- Colour (front): Black on white
- Colour (rear): Black on white

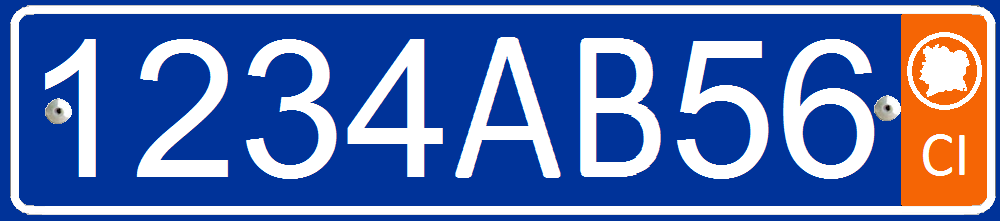
Plate of a private vehicle

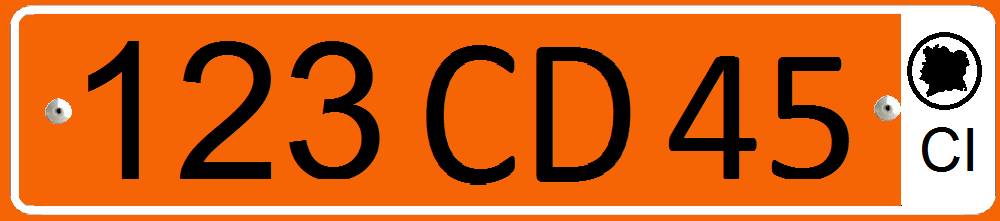
Plate of the diplomatic corps

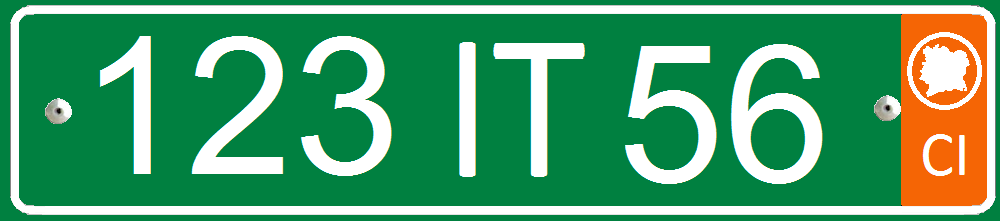
Temporary plate

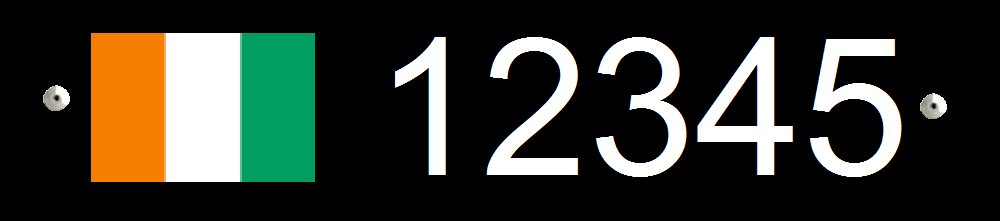
Military plate

Vehicle registration plates of Ivory Coast use European standard sizes. Ivory Coast plates are unique because of the color scheme and the location of the identifier band. The plate is white on blue and the identifier is located on the right with the colour scheme of white on orange with the outline of the country on its top and the letters CI, standing for Côte d'Ivoire (Ivory Coast) underneath. The registration identifier consists of four digits followed by two letters, then two digits. The final two digits indicate the region of origination of the vehicle.

Diplomatic plates are black on orange and contain a two-letter designation of the institute that the vehicle belongs to, for example CD for corps diplomatique (diplomatic corps), MD for mission diplomatique (diplomatic mission) or CMD chef du mission diplomatique (head of diplomatic mission). Temporary plates are white on green and contain the letters IT for immatriculation temporaire (temporary registration). Military plates white on black, with the registration identifier preceded by the flag of Ivory Coast.

Registration plates issued from 1 June 2023 use a XX-NNN-ZZ format, composed of a series of 7 alphanumeric characters: 2 letters, 3 numbers, and then 2 letters (e.g. AB-123-BC). This format is monitored nationwide and registration plates are permanently attached to a vehicle from its first registration to its disposal. Registration plates are made of reflex-reflecting material, white at the front and rear, with black characters. The old model plates remain valid and will be gradually phased out.
