= List of ambassadors of the Republic of the Congo to the United States =

Coordinates: 38.913528°N 77.036889°W

Ambassador of Republic of the Congo to the United States Embassy of the Republic of Congo in Washington, D.C.
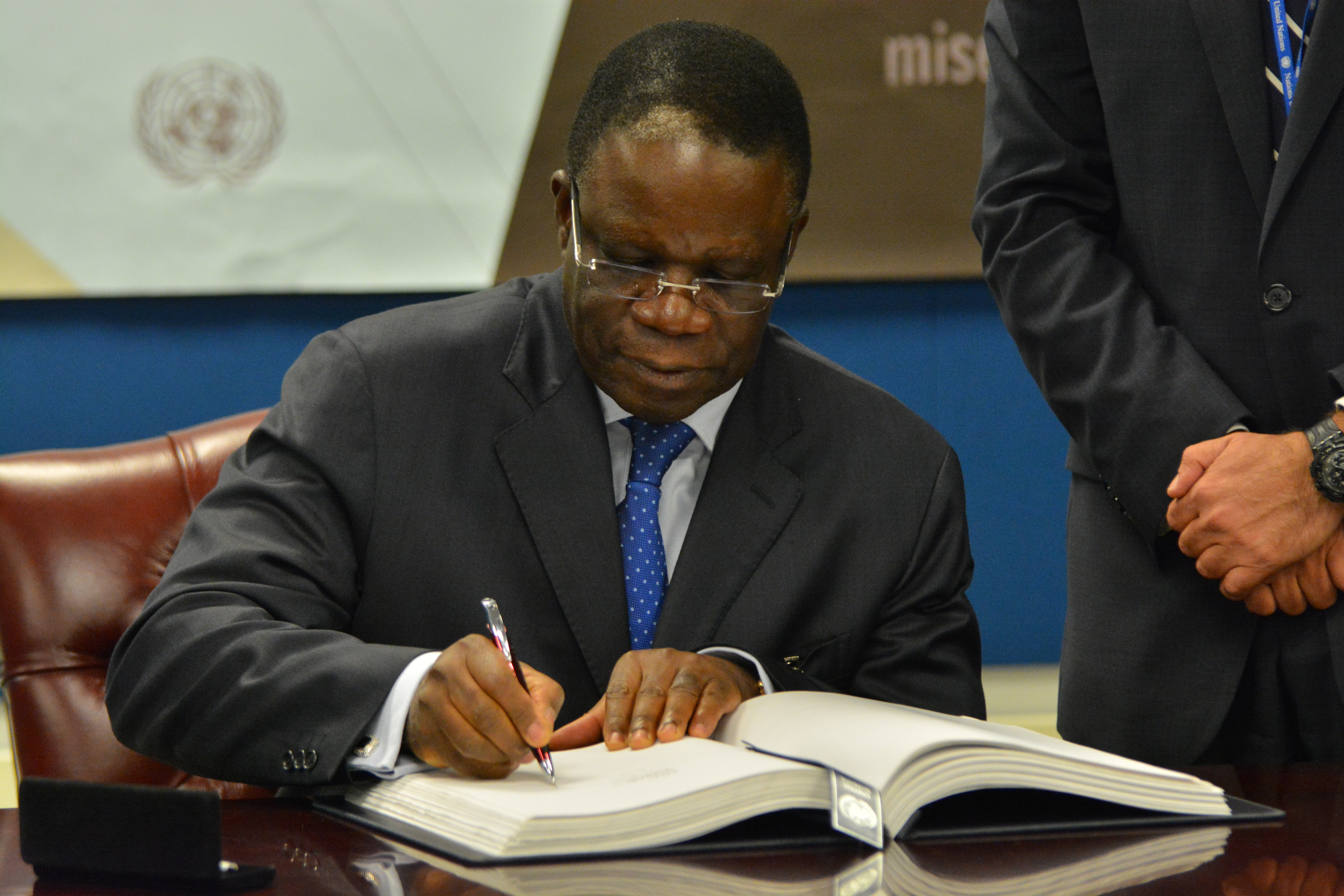
- Incumbent; Basile Ikouebe since 21 May 2026
- Inaugural holder: Charles David Ganao
- Formation: 1960

The Congolese ambassador in Washington, D. C. is the official representative of the Government in Brazzaville to the Government of the United States.

== List of representatives ==
| Diplomatic agrément | Diplomatic accreditation | Ambassador | Observations | List of presidents of the Republic of the Congo | List of presidents of the United States | Term end |
|---|---|---|---|---|---|---|
| 1960 | | Charles David Ganao | Upon independence, Ganao was named the country's first ambassador to the US and first permanent representative to the UN he then served as foreign minister from 1963 to 1974.; After brief specialized training in France, he joined the Congolese foreign ministry as head of its political division (1960–1963).; December 9, 1964: The Representative of the Congo (Brazzaville), Foreign Minister Ganao, opened the discussion in the United Nations General Assembly by stating that the Congo issue was of direct interest to his Government “. . . because it affects the race to which I have the misfortune of belonging—I refer to the black race, setting the tone by deploring the racism he saw as implicit in the Stanleyville rescue.; The mood of Black Africa after Stanleyville was summed up later by Charles-David Ganao, Foreign Minister of the Congo- Brazzaville, when he spoke in the United Nations; He was one of the leading critics at the UN of the US-Belgian airdrop in Stanleyville in 1964.; In 1964 M. Ganao had summoned the American Charge d'Affaires after a statement by Mr. Averell Harriman that discontented political; From September 1969 to 1973 he was Permanent Representative next the United Nations Office at Geneva., | Fulbert Youlou | Dwight D. Eisenhower | |
| March 21, 1961 | March 21, 1961 | | EMBASSY OPENED | Fulbert Youlou | John F. Kennedy | |
| December 9, 1960 | | Emmanuel Damongo-Dadet | | Fulbert Youlou | Dwight D. Eisenhower | January 14, 1965 |
| December 23, 1964 | | Jonas Mouanza | | Alphonse Massemba-Débat | Lyndon B. Johnson | |
| August 8, 1965 | | | EMBASSY CLOSED - Diplomats Recalled; U.S. Embassy Congo-Brazzaville closed about the same time.; DID NOT SEVER RELATIONS - most of Embassy staff removed to New York | Alphonse Massemba-Débat | Lyndon B. Johnson | |
| June 1, 1977 | | | Relations resumed under bilateral agreement | Joachim Yhombi-Opango | Jimmy Carter | |
| October 30, 1977 | | | U.S. Embassy at Brazzaville reopened in care of Jay Katzen as Charge d'Affaires. | Joachim Yhombi-Opango | Jimmy Carter | January 11, 1979 |
| October 24, 1978 | | Nicolas Mondjo | | Joachim Yhombi-Opango | Jimmy Carter | {November 5, 1985 |
| June 5, 1985 | | Stanislas Batchi | | Denis Sassou-Nguesso | Ronald Reagan | December 21, 1987 |
| November 19, 1987 | | Benjamin Bounkoulou | | Denis Sassou-Nguesso | Ronald Reagan | May 29, 1990 |
| May 21, 1990 | | Roger Issombo | | Denis Sassou-Nguesso | George H. W. Bush | December 9, 1993 |
| October 12, 1993 | | Pierre-Damien Boussoukou-Boumba | | Pascal Lissouba | Bill Clinton | April 30, 1996 |
| April 22, 1996 | | Dieudonne-Antoinne Ganga | | Pascal Lissouba | Bill Clinton | August 11, 2001 |
| June 27, 2001 | | Serge Mombouli | | Denis Sassou-Nguesso | George W. Bush | September 5, 2025 |
| | May 21, 2026 | Basile Ikouebe | | Denis Sassou-Nguesso | Donald J. Trump | |
