= Vehicle registration plates of Gabon =

Gabonese Republic
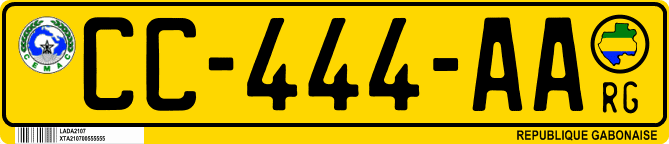
- Gabonese regular legal standard number plate.
- Country: Gabon
- Country code: G (unofficially using Guinea's code, RG)

Current series
- Size: 520 mm × 110 mm 20.5 in × 4.3 in
- Serial format: AB-123-CD
- Colour (front): Black on yellow
- Colour (rear): Black on yellow

The vehicle registration plates of Gabon is a legal form requiring the citizens of Gabon to have the car registered.

== Regular license plates ==
The current scheme of regular license plates Gabon introduced in 2013. This scheme copies the French SIV scheme of 2009 and has the format AS-123-SH, where AB-SH - Series 123 - Number. Regular plates have black letters and numbers on a yellow background. In the upper left corner of the plate are the emblem of the Central African economic and Monetary Community (CEMAC) in the right side of the plate in terms of image maps are the country's national flag colors under which the code has RG. Regional coding is missing.

=== Regular license plates until 2013 ===
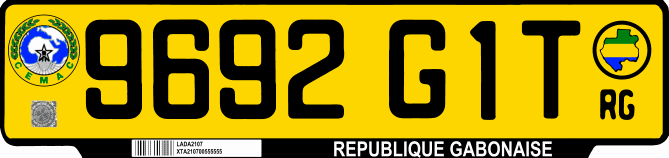
Regular license plate until 2013

By 2013, issued license plates 1234G5A format, which 1234 - number, G - pointer Gabon, 5 - a region code A - series. Regular plates had a yellow background with black marks. In the upper left corner of the plate was placed emblem Central African economic and Monetary Community (SEMAS) in the right side of the plate in the disk image was located a map of the country in the colors of the national flag under which the code was situated RG.

- G1 - Estuaire
- G2 - Haut Ogooue
- G3 - Moyen Ogooue
- G4 - Gouna
- G5 - Nyanga
- G6 - Ogooue-Ivindo
- G7 - Ogooue-Lolo
- G8 - Ogooue maritime
- G9 - Woleu-Ntem

== Other formats ==
=== Taxi ===
License plate for a taxi with black characters on a white background and format similar to regular.

=== Military transport ===
License plates military units are formatted 123456 white characters on a black background. In the left side plate affixed logo formation. The first figure, the French custom, mean kind of military formation.

=== Diplomatic license plates ===
Diplomatic license plates with white characters on a green background and 123CD45 format, which 123 - country code or international organization, CD - index diplomatic staff, 45 - number.

==== Temporary import ====
License plates for foreign NGOs have white characters on a red background and format 1234ITA where 1234 - serial number, IT - pointer temporary importation A - series.
