= Arsène Tsaty-Boungou =

Congolese political figure

Destin Arsène Tsaty-Boungou is a Congolese political figure. Tsaty Boungou was Minister of Foreign Affairs of the Republic of the Congo from 1995 to 1997 under President Pascal Lissouba.

Tsaty-Boungou is a lawyer from Niari Region. He earned a Ph.D. in law from Pantheon-Sorbonne University. During his studies, he served as President of the General Union of Congolese Pupils and Students (Union Générale des Élèves et Étudiants Congolais (UGEEC) ). He participated in the February–June 1991 National Conference and was included on the National Conference's committee for the drafting of internal regulations. Subsequently, he was legal adviser to President Lissouba for a time and was appointed as Minister of Foreign Affairs in 1995. Tsaty-Boungou remained in his post as Foreign Minister in the government of Prime Minister Bernard Kolélas, appointed in September 1997, but lost his position a month later when rebels loyal to Denis Sassou Nguesso captured Brazzaville. Tsaty-Boungou is currently a member of the Pan-African Union for Social Democracy (Union Panafricaine pour la Démocratie Sociale). Since September 2010, he has held the position of Vice-President of the UPADS (Union Panafricaine pour la Démocratie Sociale) and spokesman of the council of Vice-Presidents.

Preceded by Benjamin Bounkoulou	Foreign Minister of the Republic of the Congo; 1995–1997	Succeeded by Rodolphe Adada
