= Antoine Ndinga Oba =

Congolese politician, diplomat and linguist

Antoine Ndinga Oba (1941 – 17 May 2005) was a Congolese diplomat, political figure, and linguist. During the single-party rule of the Congolese Labour Party (PCT), he served in the government of Congo-Brazzaville as Minister of National Education from 1977 to 1984 and as Minister of Foreign Affairs from 1984 to 1991. Later, he was Congo-Brazzaville's Ambassador to UNESCO from 1998 until his death in 2005.

== Academic and diplomatic career ==
Ndinga Oba was born in 1941 at Biala, near Oyo, located in Cuvette Region. He worked as a professor of linguistics at the Marien Ngouabi University in Brazzaville. From 1972 to 1973, he was Director of the National Institute of Research and Pedagogy, and from 1973 to 1976 he was Director of INSSED; subsequently he was Rector of the University of Brazzaville (later Marien Ngouabi University) from 1976 to 1977.

In 1972, Ndinga Oba was elected to the Central Committee of the Congolese Labour Party (PCT), but he was dropped from the Central Committee in 1975. He was appointed as Minister of National Education on 5 April 1977 and returned to the Central Committee in 1979, when Denis Sassou Nguesso, a cousin of Ndinga Oba, became president. In August 1984, Ndinga Oba was moved from his post as Minister of National Education to that of Minister of Foreign Affairs and Cooperation; in the same year, he was elected to the PCT's expanded 13-member Political Bureau.

In a September 1986 speech at the United Nations, Ndinga Oba compared apartheid South Africa and Israel to Nazi Germany. Israel complained to the United States about this speech, and the United States in turn complained to Congo; it reportedly pressured the Congolese government with a warning that US president Ronald Reagan might decline to meet with Sassou Nguesso when the latter visited the US in October 1986. In the week after the speech, Ndinga Oba apologized to Israel. He was removed from the Political Bureau at a plenary session of the Central Committee in November 1986, when the Political Bureau's size was decreased from 13 members to 10 members. On 13 August 1989, he was promoted to the rank of Minister of State in the government, while remaining in charge of foreign affairs. He continued to serve as Foreign Minister until 1991, and from 1991 to 1992 he was the Personal Representative of President Sassou Nguesso.

Ndinga Oba became a professor at the Study Center of Congolese Languages in 1992, remaining there until 1998. He was appointed as Congo's Ambassador to UNESCO, located in Paris, on 20 August 1998. It was believed that he received this posting because he was in poor health and would have access to better medical treatment in Paris. On 7 February 2003, Ndinga Oba was elected as President of the African UNESCO Group by African ambassadors meeting at UNESCO's headquarters. In this capacity, he was charged with coordinating relations between UNESCO and African countries.

As a linguist, Ndinga Oba wrote extensively on Bantu languages. In 2004, he published a two-volume linguistic study, The Bantu Languages of Congo-Brazzaville: Typological Study of the Languages of Group C20 (Mbosi or Mbochi) (Les langues bantoues du Congo-Brazzaville – Étude typologique des langues du groupe C20 (mbosi ou mbochi)). Other linguistic books written by Ndinga Oba included Lingala and Mounoukoutouba: two variants of Kibangou (Le lingala et le Mounoukoutouba - deux variantes de Kibangou) and Lexical Structures of Lingala (Structures lexicologiques du lingala). He also wrote on the subject of education; in 1989, he published Education in Africa: the Case of Congo (L'Education en Afrique, le cas du Congo). Another book by Ndinga Oba, On the Banks of the Alima (Sur les rives de l'Alima), was published in Paris in 2003. On the Banks of the Alima (its title is a reference to the Alima River; Ndinga Oba was born near the Alima) is a philosophical story that takes the form of a dialogue between a father and daughter; it focuses on the need to maintain a connection to the past and preserve cultural heritage, while at the same time looking outward towards the world and embracing a positive form of globalization.

While serving as Ambassador to UNESCO, Ndinga Oba died on 17 May 2005 in Paris. His body was returned to Congo-Brazzaville, and after a tribute at the Palace of the Parliament in Brazzaville, he was buried at his family cemetery in Oyo on 27 May 2005. President Sassou Nguesso and Gabonese President Omar Bongo were present for his funeral.

Preceded by Pierre Nze	Foreign Minister of the Republic of the Congo; 1984–1991	Succeeded by Jean-Blaise Kololo
