= Rodolphe Adada =

Congolese politician and diplomat

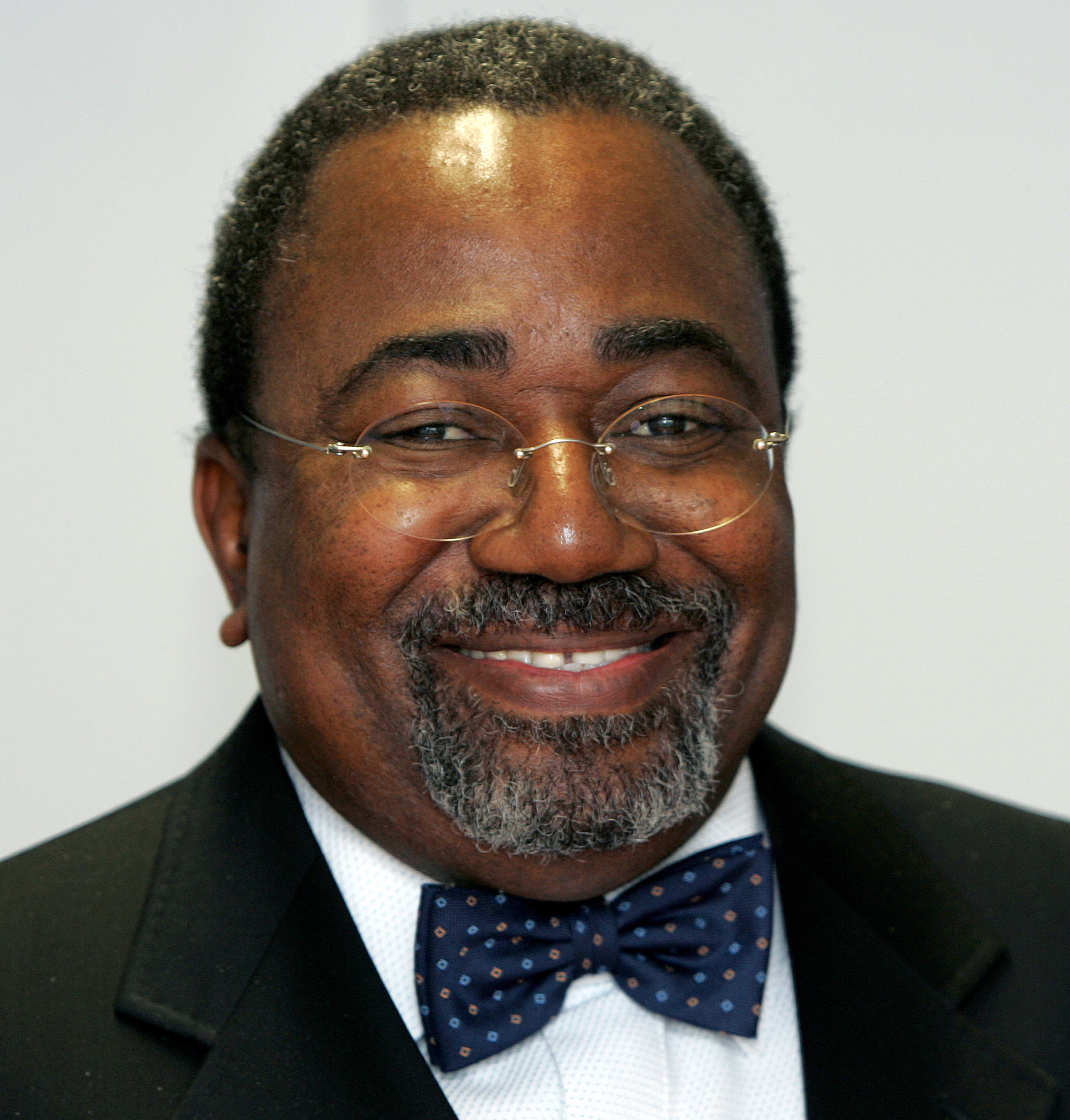
Rodolphe Adada in 2005.

Rodolphe Adada (born 24 April 1946) is a Congolese politician and diplomat. During the single-party rule of the Congolese Labour Party (PCT), he served in the government of Congo-Brazzaville as Minister of Mines and Energy from 1977 to 1984, as Minister of Mines and Oil from 1984 to 1989, and as Minister of Secondary and Higher Education from 1989 to 1991. Later, he was Minister of Foreign Affairs under President Denis Sassou Nguesso from 1997 to 2007 and Joint Special Representative of the United Nations and the African Union for Darfur from 2007 to 2009. He returned to the government of Congo-Brazzaville in 2009, serving as Minister of State for Industrial Development from 2009 to 2012, and as Minister of State for Transport from 2012 to 2016. He has been Ambassador to France since 2016.

== Political career ==
Adada, an ethnic Mbochi, was born in Gamboma, French Congo on 24 April 1946. He obtained a doctorate in mathematics from France in the early 1970s. He was a mathematician by profession and elected to the Central Committee of the PCT in 1972. In January 1976, he became the head of the newly created scientific research department and member of the state council, with the rank of cabinet minister. Under Joachim Yhombi-Opango, he was appointed as Minister of Mines and Energy in the government named on 5 April 1977. He remained in the government under Sassou Nguesso, who took power in 1979. He remained in his post as Minister of Mines and Energy until 1984, when he was instead appointed as Minister of Mines and Oil. In the government named on 13 August 1989, he was moved to the position of Minister of Secondary and Higher Education, in charge of Scientific Research; he remained in that position until 1991. With the fall of Sassou Nguesso regime, he went into exile in France in 1992 and returned in 1997.

After Sassou Nguesso returned to power in October 1997, he appointed Adada as Minister of Foreign Affairs and Cooperation on 2 November 1997. In the May 2002 parliamentary election, Adada was elected to the National Assembly as the PCT candidate in the first constituency of Ouenzé, the fifth arrondissement of Brazzaville; he won the seat in the first round with 67.46% of the vote. After the election, he retained his post as Minister of Foreign Affairs, Cooperation, and La Francophonie in the government appointed on 18 August 2002.

In March 2003, Adada visited Bangui in the wake of François Bozizé's seizure of power in the Central African Republic. He met with Bozizé and effectively endorsed the takeover, saying that Bozizé was trustworthy because he had expressed a "vision" of "openness" and "reconciliation". In doing so, Adada ignored the African Union's official condemnation of the takeover.

Adada was to visit the People's Republic of China on behalf of Congo-Brazzaville, as announced by the Chinese government on their Ministry of Foreign Affairs website on 16 March 2004. He was promoted to the rank of Minister of State for Foreign Affairs in the government named on 7 January 2005.

On 8 May 2007, Adada was named Joint Special Representative of the United Nations and the African Union for Darfur, in which capacity he was in charge of the peacekeeping mission there. On 31 May, Basile Ikouébé was appointed to replace him as Foreign Minister.

Speaking to the United Nations Security Council on 27 April 2009, Adada said the violence in Darfur had been reduced to the point that the conflict there was "low-intensity". This claim outraged many of those involved in the Darfur situation.

The United Nations–African Union peacekeeping mission, UNAMID, announced on 25 August 2009 that Adada was resigning from his post and that his resignation would take effect on 31 August. UNAMID's deployment was characterized as "slow and difficult", and Adada had faced some criticism from diplomats who argued he was not effective. UN Secretary General Ban Ki-moon praised Adada, writing to him that he had "led UNAMID with distinction during its most challenging initial deployment phase and in an environment of unprecedented difficulty." Speaking to Agence France-Presse in an interview, Adada argued that he had been successful in his mission because massacres no were no longer occurring: "I would like to be judged, for UNAMID to be judged, on the number of deaths in Darfur." He said that he resigned as a matter of "personal choice". He reiterated his view that "there is no more fighting on the ground" and that continued violence was due to crime, not warfare. Adada also said that the Sudanese government had not fully cooperated with UNAMID, but that he had no choice but to work with the government, and he criticized the international community for not sending helicopters to UNAMID. Before he departed Sudan, he was awarded the Order of the Two Niles by Sudanese President Omar el-Bashir on 7 September 2009.

Shortly after Adada left his post in Darfur, Sassou Nguesso reappointed him to the Congolese government as Minister of State for Industrial Development and the Promotion of the Private Sector on 15 September 2009. At the PCT's Sixth Extraordinary Congress, held in July 2011, Adada was elected to the PCT's 51-member Political Bureau.

Following the July–August 2012 parliamentary election, Adada was moved to the post of Minister of State for Transport, Civil Aviation, and the Merchant Marine on 25 September 2012. While Adada was serving in that post, a plane crash occurred at the Maya-Maya Airport in Brazzaville on the evening of 30 November 2012, killing 32 people. Adada visited the scene on the morning after the crash. At an official tribute to the victims held on 10 December 2012, he said that the cause of the crash was being investigated. Adada was believed to be "completely marginalized" by 2013, with matters falling under his ministerial portfolio effectively controlled by Jean-Jacques Bouya.

During the campaign for the September 2014 local elections, Adada was dispatched to Niari Department to campaign for the PCT's candidates there.

After Sassou Nguesso's victory in the March 2016 presidential election, Adada was dismissed from the government on 30 April 2016. He was appointed as Ambassador to France in July 2016, replacing Henri Lopes, and presented his credentials to French President François Hollande on 9 November 2016.

Preceded by Arsène Tsaty Boungou	Foreign Minister of the Republic of the Congo; 1997–2007	Succeeded by Basile Ikouébé
