= African Diplomatic Corps =

Lobbying group from Africa

The African Diplomatic Corps is a body consisting of the 53 ambassadors to the United States that represent African countries. Its goal is to lobby United States politicians and educate diplomats, educators, policy analysts, and the media about current events in Africa. The African Diplomatic Corps founded "Africa Week" in Washington, D.C., and the corps' most recent leader was Serge Mombouli, Ambassador of the Republic of Congo, from 2015 until his death in September 2025. He succeeded Ambassador Roble Olhaye of Djibouti who died July 22, 2015.

== See also ==
- Diplomatic Corps
