= Pierre Nzé =

Congolese politician and diplomat

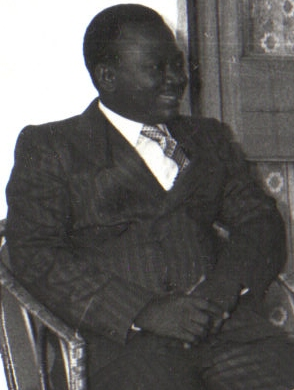
Pierre Nzé in 1979.

Pierre Nzé (born 1939) is a Congolese politician and diplomat. During the single-party rule of the Congolese Labour Party (PCT), he held leading positions in the government and party. Later, he was Minister of State for Justice from 1997 to 1999, and he served in the Senate of the Republic of the Congo from 2002 to 2011.

== Political career ==
Under Marien Ngouabi, Nzé was appointed as Minister of State for Information, Popular Education, and Cultural Affairs in the government named on January 1, 1969. On June 21, 1969, Nzé was included on the five-member Executive Committee of the ruling National Revolutionary Council (CNR) as President of the Education, Press, and Propaganda Committee. He was a founding member of the PCT in December 1969 and was one of the original members of its Central Committee; he was also included in the party's original Political Bureau and was assigned responsibility for propaganda. He was again included in the smaller, five-member Political Bureau elected in December 1971 and was assigned responsibility for organization and propaganda.

Acting as spokesman for the PCT Political Bureau, Nzé announced a new draft constitution following its adoption by the December 1972 PCT congress; at the same congress, he was included on the PCT's five-member Political Bureau. He was expelled from the party along with others on June 11, 1976, although he was subsequently readmitted and restored to a seat on the Political Bureau. He was later Minister of Foreign Affairs from 1979 to 1984 under President Denis Sassou Nguesso; he was also assigned responsibility for foreign relations on the Political Bureau during the same period. He made an official visit to the Soviet Union in May 1979.

In August 1984, Nzé was replaced as Foreign Minister by Antoine Ndinga Oba, who had previously served as Minister of Education; Nzé remained on the Political Bureau with responsibility for foreign relations. Although he was considered "one of the PCT's leading theoreticians", Nzé was subsequently removed from the PCT Political Bureau at a plenary session of the Central Committee in November 1986, when the Political Bureau's size was decreased from 13 members to 10 members.

Following the introduction of multiparty politics, Nzé led the National Union for Democracy and Progress (UNDP), a political party founded in 1990. In June 1997, following the outbreak of the 1997 civil war, Nzé was included on the National Mediation Committee. He represented Sassou Nguesso in a consultation meeting related to the conflict that took place in Brazzaville in mid-June. The war concluded with Sassou Nguesso's rebel forces capturing Brazzaville in October 1997, and in the national unity government formed under Sassou Nguesso on November 2, 1997, Nzé was appointed as Minister of State for Justice. He headed the Republic of Congo's delegation to a meeting, held in Kinshasa on September 22, 1998, in which bilateral relations between the Republic of Congo and Democratic Republic of the Congo were discussed. Acting on behalf of Congo-Brazzaville's government, he later signed a non-aggression pact with Democratic Republic of the Congo in December 1998.

In the government appointed on January 12, 1999, Nzé was replaced as Justice Minister, and he was not included in the government. He was then appointed as a Political Delegate to the President of the Republic on January 18, 1999.

Standing as a UNDP candidate, Nzé was elected as a Senator from Sangha Region in the 2002 Senate election. On August 23, 2002, he was elected by the Senate as a Vice-President of the Commission on Foreign Affairs, Regional Integration, and Development Cooperation. In the October 2005 Senate election, Nzé was re-elected to the Senate as a UNDP candidate in Sangha Region. He received the votes of 54 electors, placing sixth and therefore winning the last of the six available seats from Sangha Region.

The UNDP merged into the New Democratic Forces (FDN) in early 2007, and Nzé became one of three FDN senators. Following the FDN's First Ordinary Congress on 2–3 May 2010, Nze was installed as one of the seven members of the High Council of Dignitaries, a consultative body within the FDN leadership, on 1 June 2010.

Nzé was appointed as Personal Representative of the President on 20 September 2011. He was not re-elected to the Senate in the October 2011 Senate election.
