= Louis Kpado =

Mayor of Bangui
- In office 3 April 1970 – 26 April 1971
- President: Jean-Bédel Bokassa
- Preceded by: Jean Michel Benzot
- Succeeded by: Jean Louis Psimhis

Minister of Interior
- In office 4 February 1970 – 26 April 1971
- President: Jean-Bédel Bokassa
- Preceded by: ?
- Succeeded by: Jean Louis Psimhis

Deputy Minister of Interior
- In office 17 September 1969 – 4 February 1970
- President: Jean-Bédel Bokassa

Deputy Minister of National and Foreign Trade
- In office 28 February 1969 – 17 September 1969
- President: Jean-Bédel Bokassa

Personal details
- Born: 1940 (aged 84-85) Pouloubou, Ubangi-Shari (now the Central African Republic)
- Education: IHEOM
- Occupation: Bureaucrat; Politician

Louis Kpado (born 1940) is a Central African bureaucrat and politician who served in various ministerial positions during the Bokassa regime.

== Early and personal life ==
Kpado was born in Pouloubou in 1940. On 19 November 1958, during his final year in high school, the government granted him a scholarship to study as an auditor at IHEOM and also awarded him an allowance of 5,000 CFA francs before leaving Ubangi-Shari. Upon completing high school in 1959, he studied in IHEOM.

After completing study in IHEOM, Kpado returned to the Central African Republic and served as the Head of National Economy in 1962. On 7 August 1964, David Dacko appointed him as the Head of Trade and Industry. He also represented the government at the National Agricultural Operations Company (SNEA).

Jean-Bédel Bokassa named Kpado as Deputy Minister of National and Foreign Trade on 28 February 1969. He then became the Deputy Minister of Interior on 17 September 1969. Bokassa conducted a cabinet reshuffle on 4 February 1970, appointing Kpado as Minister of the Interior. While serving as the Minister of Interior, he also became the Mayor of Bangui from 3 April 1970 to 26 February 1971 and Director of National Industrial Manufacturing Company (SONAFI) in September 1970. He stepped down as Minister of Interior, and the position was replaced by Jean Louis Psimhis, who concurrently served as Mayor of Bangui.
