= Colonial School, Paris =

Higher education institution in Paris, France

Coordinates: 48°50′38″N 2°20′11″E

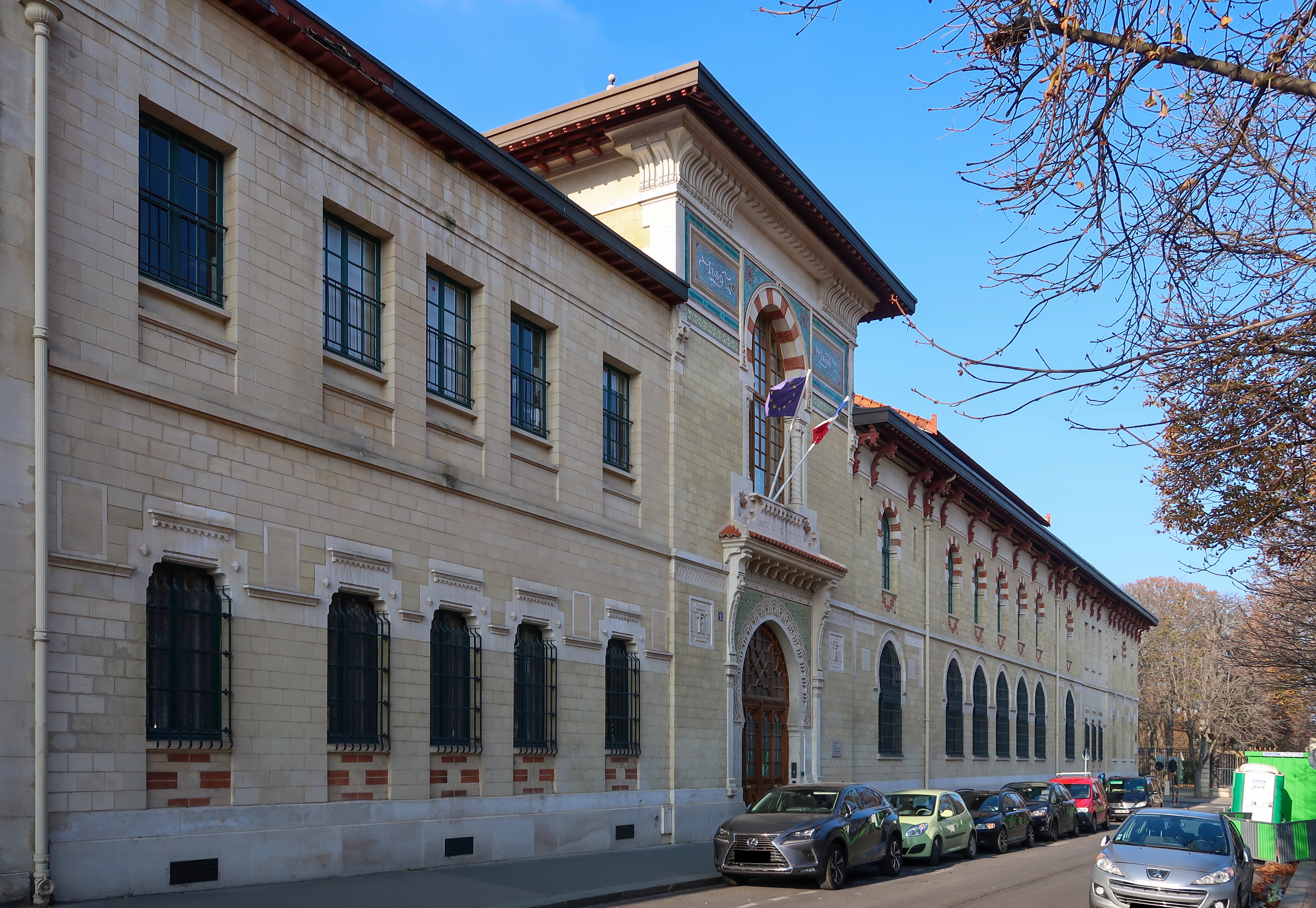
Façade of the Colonial School building on avenue de l'Observatoire in Paris

The Colonial School (French: École coloniale, also known colloquially as la Colo) was a French public higher education institution or grande école, created in Paris in 1889 to provide training for public servants and administrators of the French colonial empire. It also was a center for research in geography, anthropology, ethnology and other scientific endeavors with a focus on French-administered territories.

As France's overseas possessions changed and shrank, the school was restructured and renamed on several occasions: in 1934 as École nationale de la France d'outre-mer (ENFOM, "National School of Overseas France"), in 1959 as Institut des hautes études d'Outre-Mer (IHEOM, "Institute of Higher Overseas Studies"), and in 1966 as Institut international d’administration publique (IIAP, "International Institute of Public Administration"). It had students from both Metropolitan France and its overseas possessions and colonies. Its latest incarnation, the IIAP, was sometimes referred to as "the foreigners' ENA" with reference to France's École nationale d'administration, and was eventually merged into ENA in 2002.

== Background ==
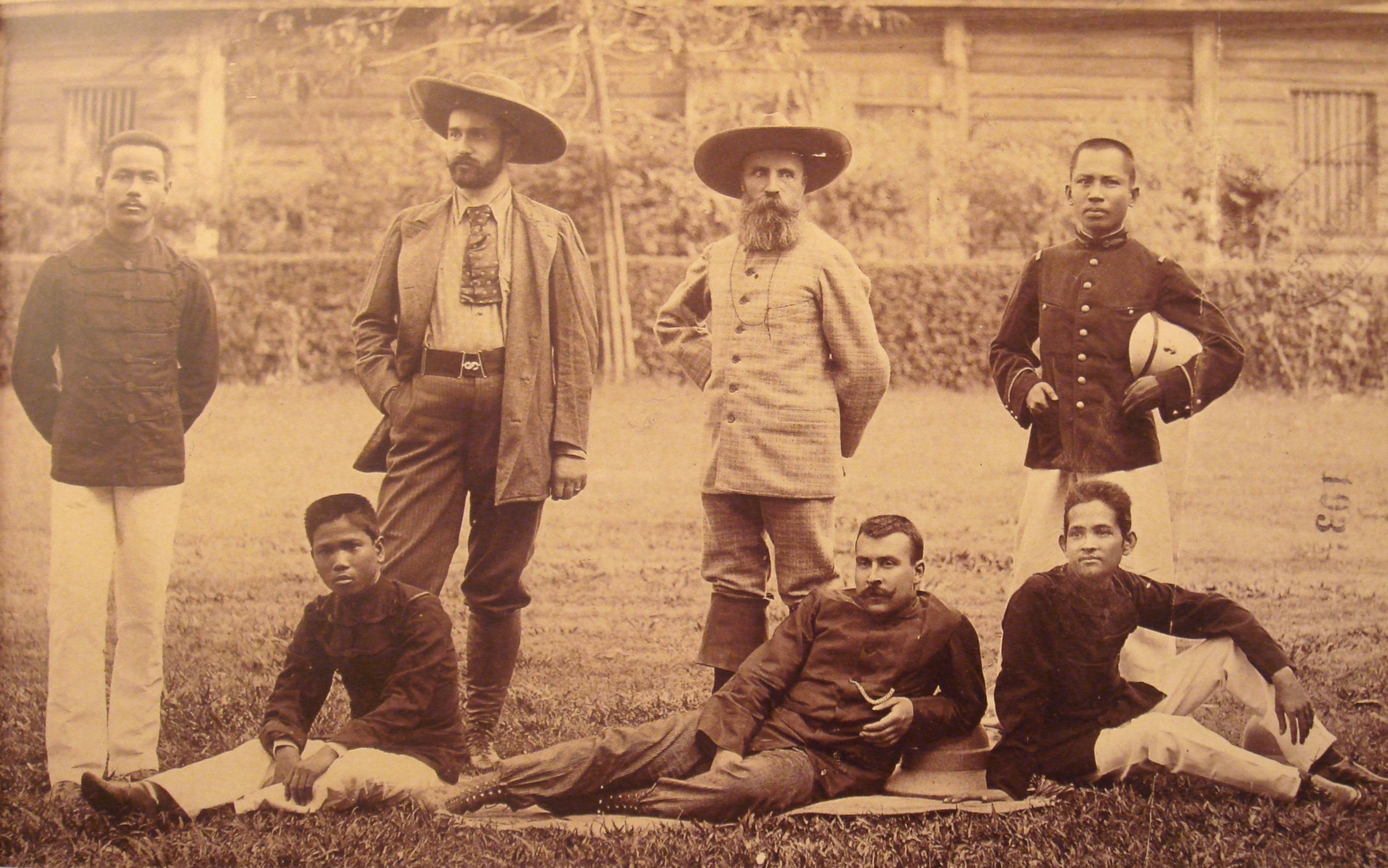
Auguste Pavie (third from left, standing) and Pierre Lefèvre-Pontalis in 1893 with Cambodian interpreters trained at the École coloniale.

In 1885, explorer and administrator Auguste Pavie created a training program for native employees of the telegraph service in French Cambodia, which took the name of mission cambodgienne ("Cambodian mission"). This was succeeded in 1889 by the Colonial School as a fully-fledged establishment for the professional education of colonial services staff. Its creation, supported by State Councillor Paul Dislère, was the first successful effort to create a permanent establishment specifically for the training of French civil servants, thus prefiguring both ENA and the French National School for the Judiciary.

African students were admitted from 1892 alongside the Cambodian class, and soon later, students from Metropolitan France as well.

In 1927, classes préparatoires were created at both Lycée Louis-le-Grand and Lycée Henri-IV to prepare future students of the Colonial School, and the latter's training was made free of charge in 1931.

== Building ==
The school's building in Paris, on 2 avenue de l'Observatoire near the Jardin du Luxembourg, was designed by architect Maurice Yvon and built from 1895 to 1911. The Colonial School moved there in 1896 after having been located during its first few years on rue Jacob.

It is a prime exemplar of French colonial Moorish Revival architecture, with inspiration principally from Moroccan architecture, and used to be known colloquially as the "old mosque" since it predated the Grand Mosque of Paris, built in a similar style. Its decorative features include works by painters Charles Lameire, Gabriel-Charles Deneux and Claude Bourgonnier, and by ceramic artist Jules Paul Loebnitz.

The building was successively the seat of ENFOM, IHEOM, and IIAP including after the latter's absorption by ENA in 2002. Some of the building's decoration evoking colonial glories was deemed inappropriate and removed in the 1970s.

In 2007, Sciences Po acquired ENA's Parisian campus on the rue de l'Université, and ENA made the Colonial School building its sole Parisian location at the end of that year. On 1 January 2022, ENA was in turn replaced by the Institut national du service public, which kept the Colonial School building as its Paris campus.

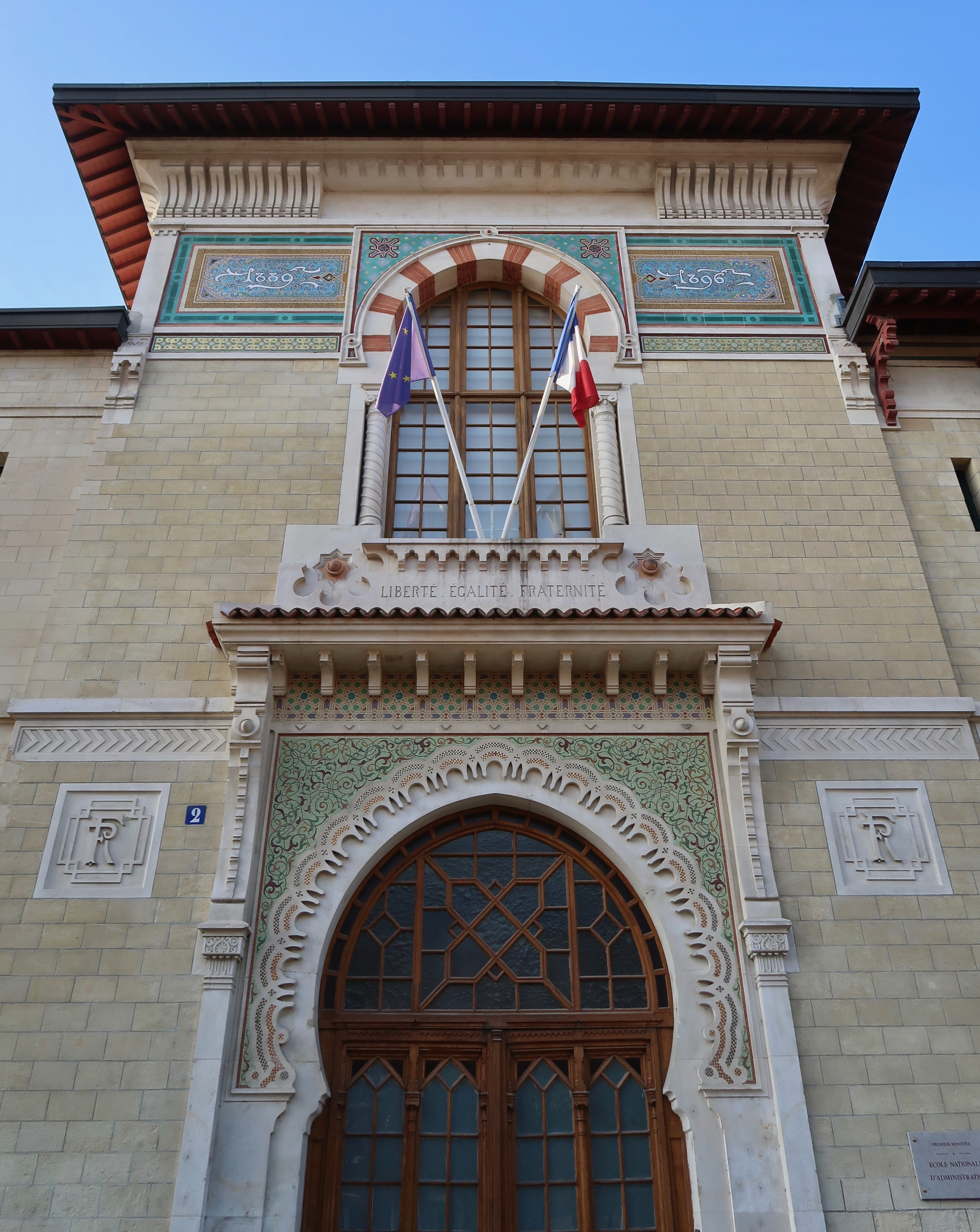
Main portal on avenue de l'Observatoire

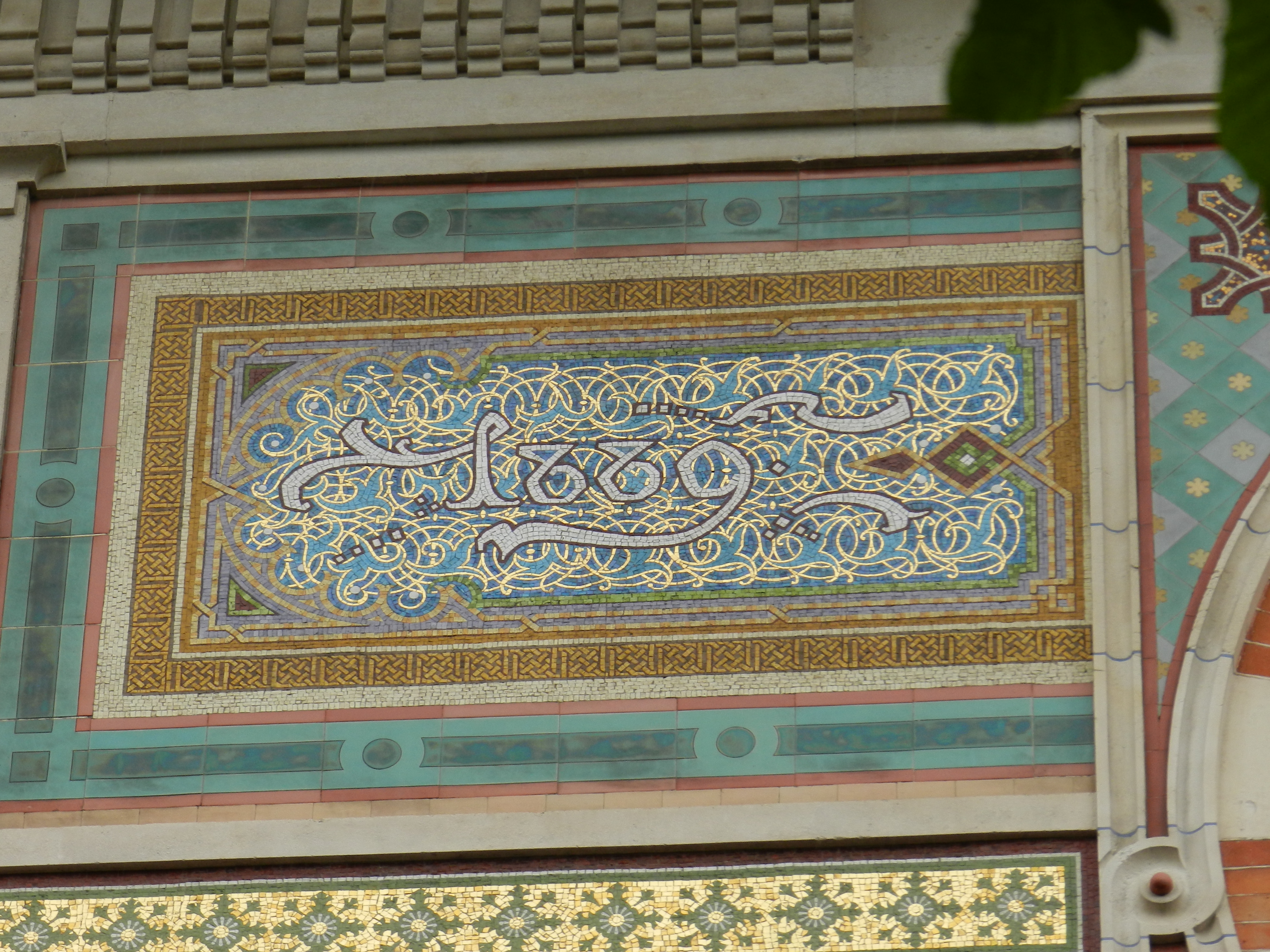
Ceramic detail displaying the date 1889 as reference to the school's creation

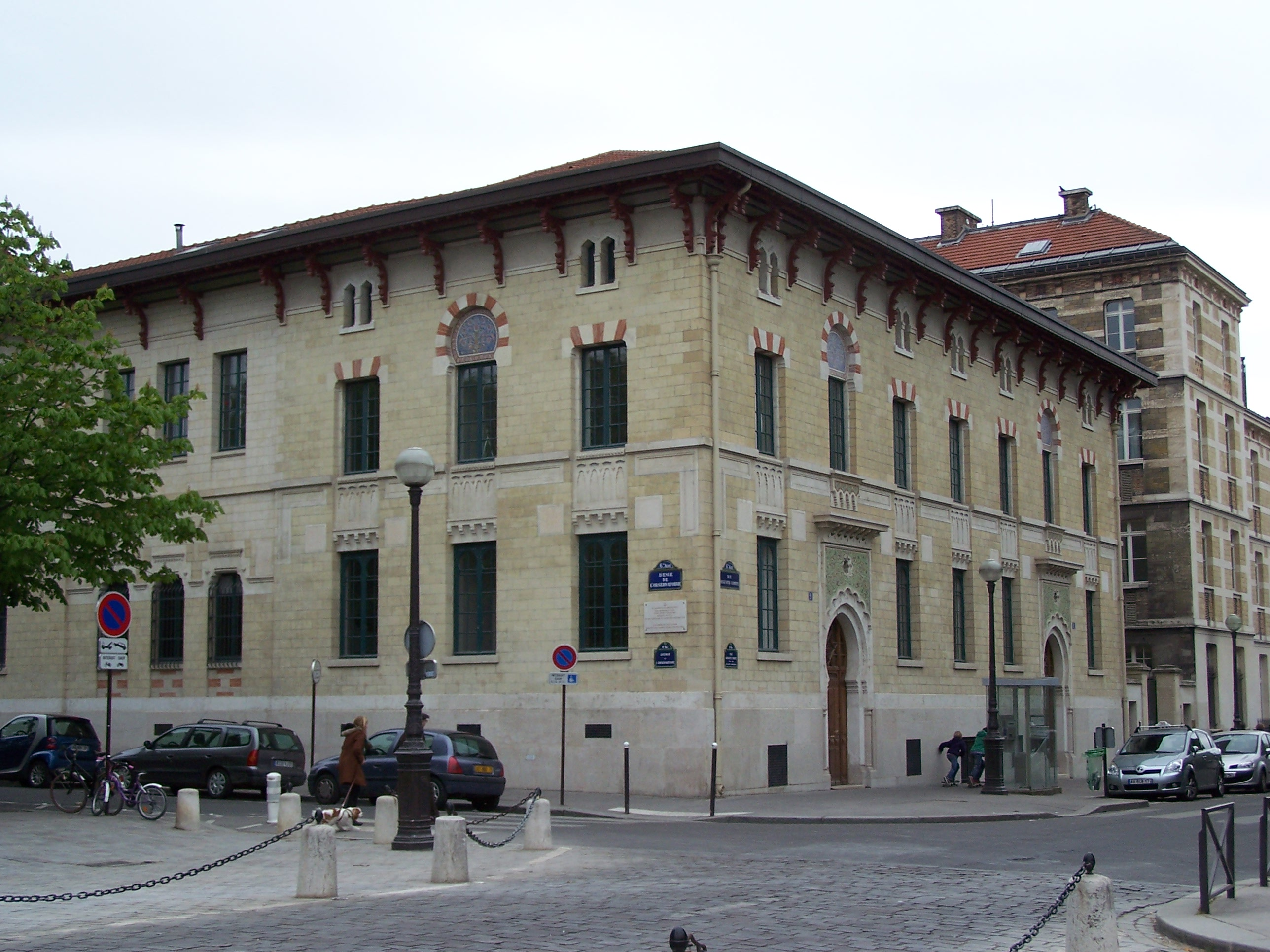
Corner with rue Auguste Comte, with adjacent Lycée Montaigne in the background

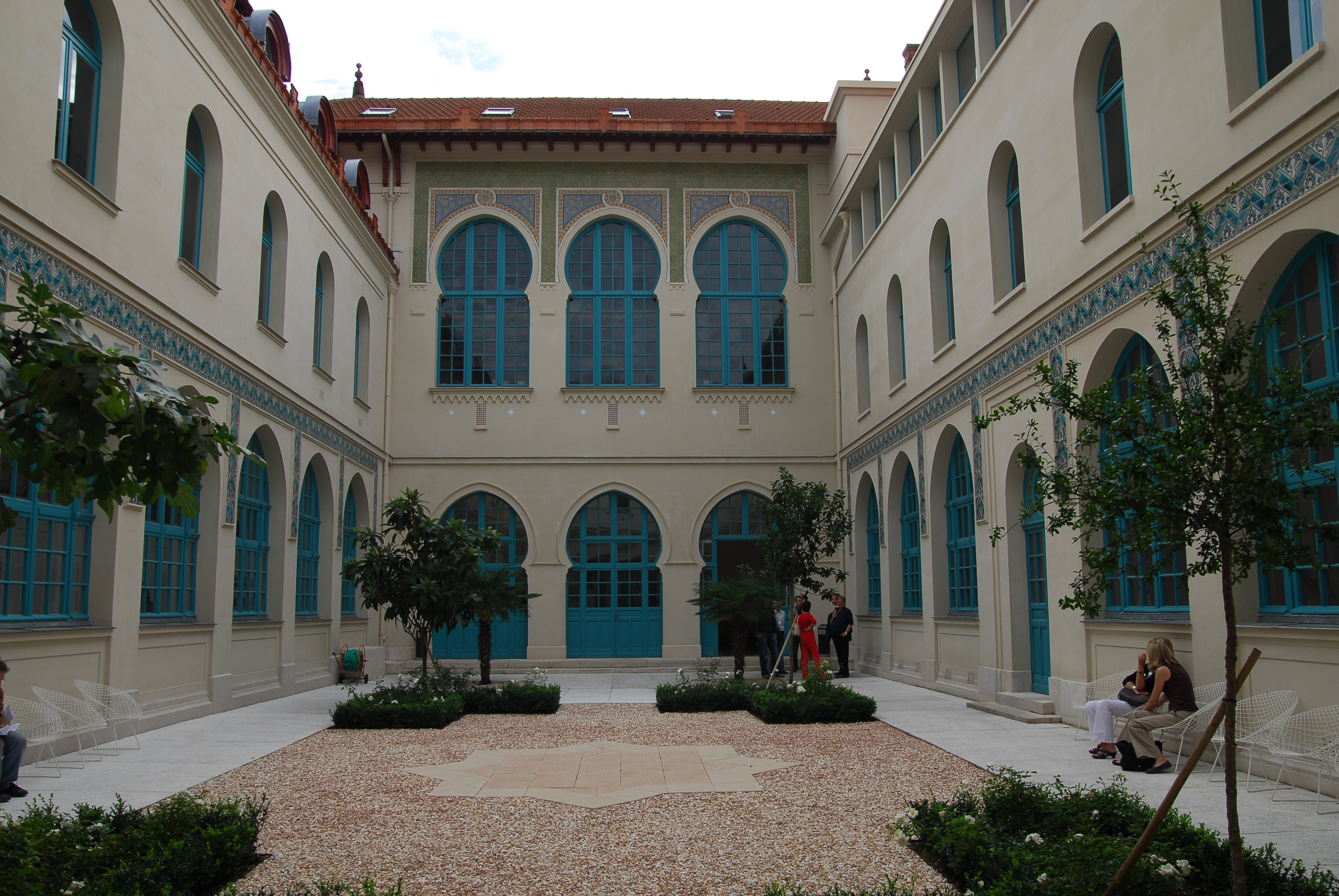
Main courtyard

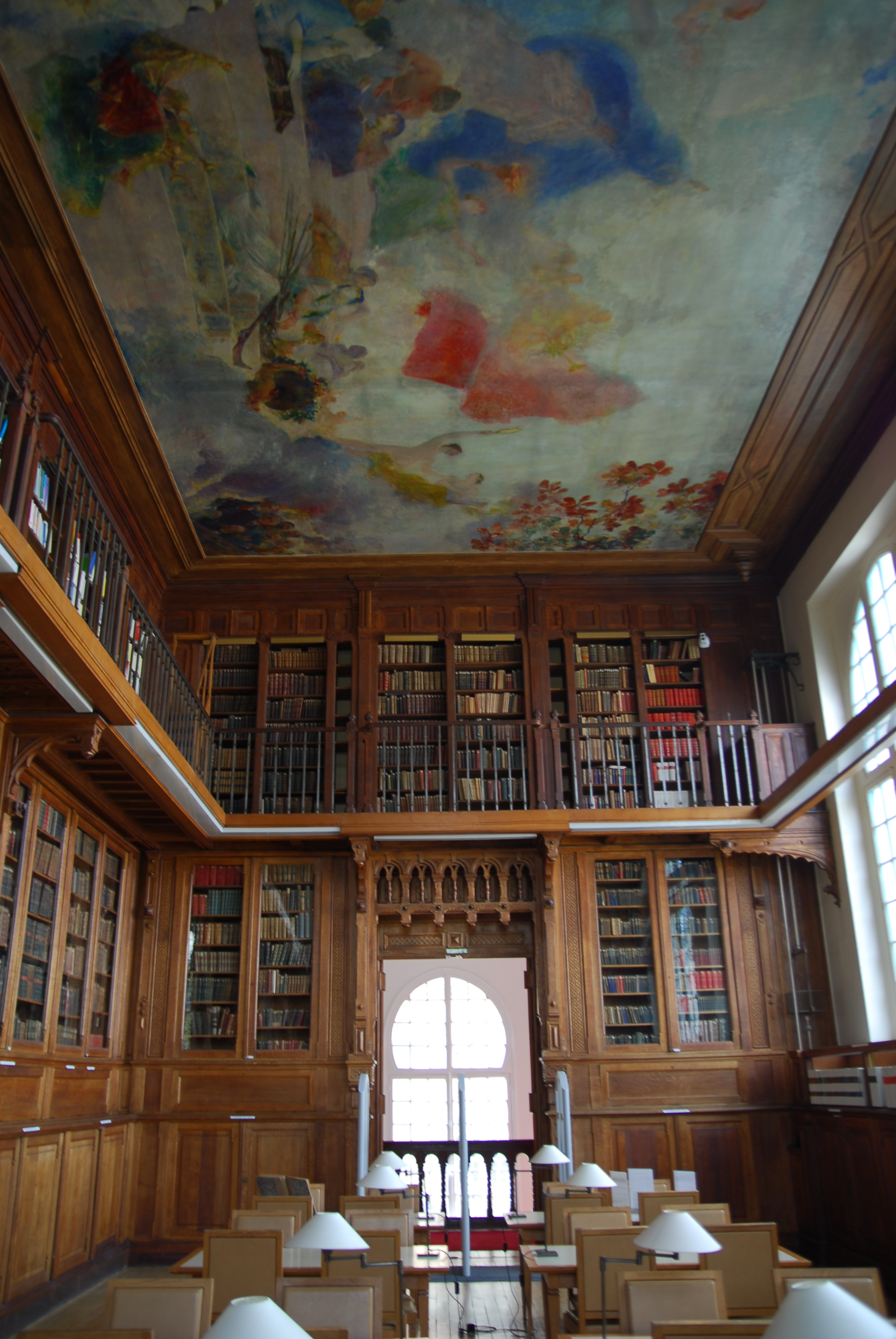
Library with painted ceiling by Claude Bourgonnier

== Leadership ==
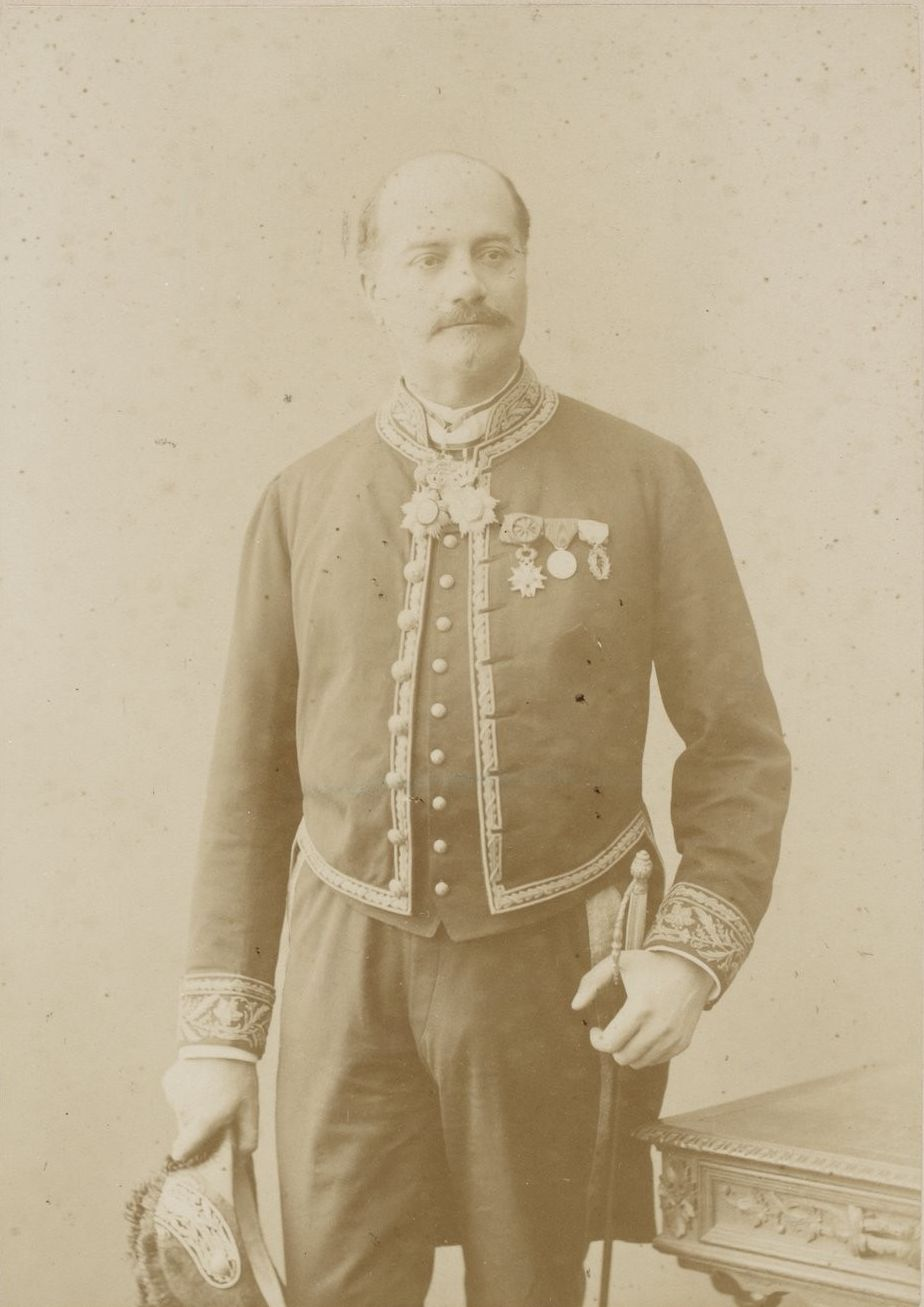
Etienne Aymonier, first director of the Colonial School

=== Directors ===
- 1889–1905: Etienne Aymonier
- 1905–1917: Maurice Doubrère
- 1918–1926: Max Outrey
- 1926–1933: Georges Hardy
- 1933–1937: Henri Gourdon
- 1937–1946: Robert Delavignette
- 1946–1950: Paul Mus
- 1950–1959: Paul Bouteille
- 1959–1964: François Luchaire
- 1965–1974: Jean Baillou
- 1974–1982: Henri Roson
- 1982–1985: Gaston Olive
- 1985–1993: Jean-Pierre Puissochet
- 1993: Michel Franc
- 1993–2001: Didier Maus

=== Selected faculty ===
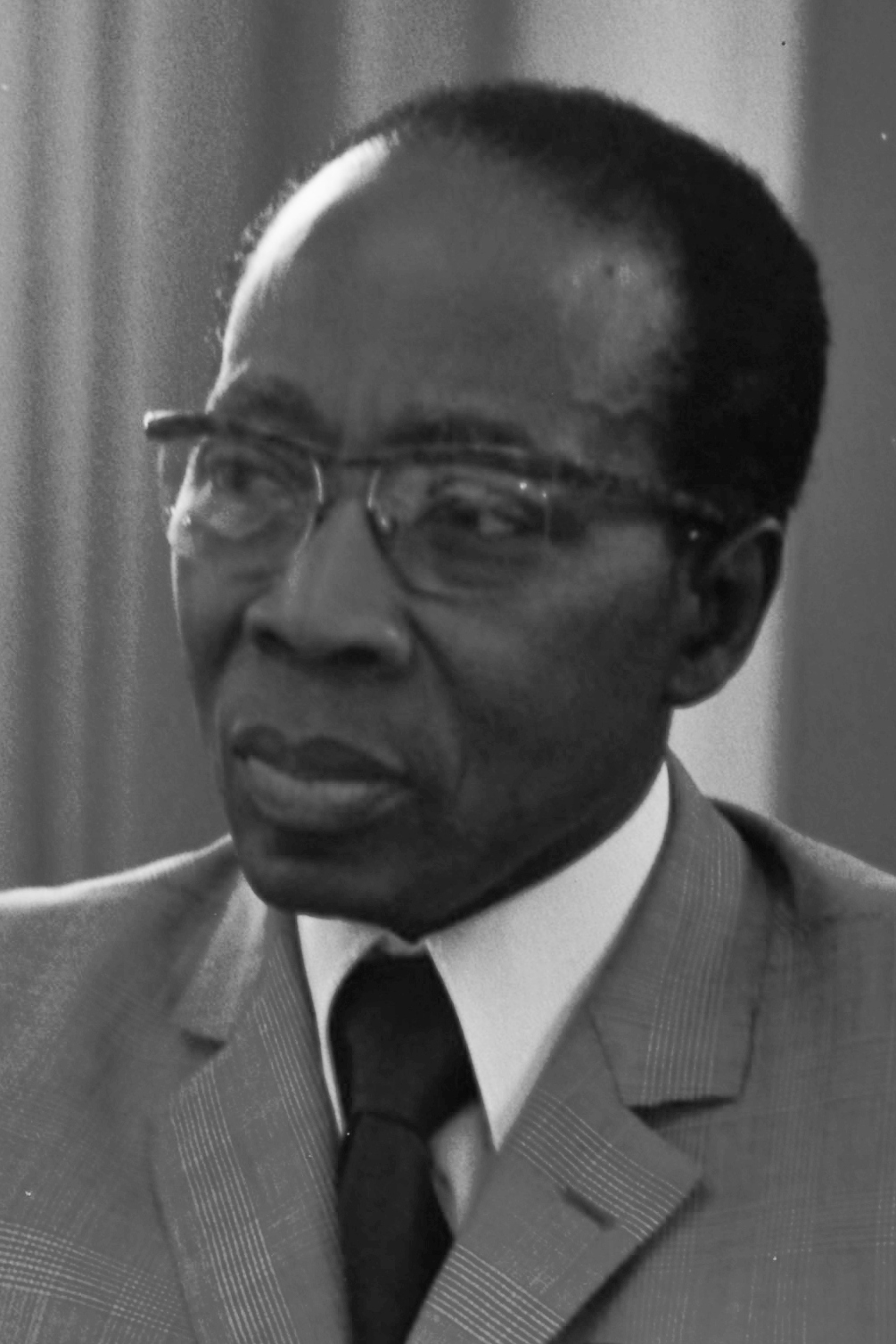
Léopold Sédar Senghor taught at ENFOM, then IHEOM from 1945 to 1960

- Hubert Lyautey
- Jules Brévié
- Pierre Moussa
- Louis Vignon
- Charles-André Julien
- Henri Brunschwig
- Léopold Sédar Senghor

== Selected alumni ==
- Max Jacob (1876–1944), French poet
- Félix Éboué (1884–1944), colonial administrator
- Sisavang Vong (1885–1959), King of Luang Prabang and of Laos
- Phetsarath Rattanavongsa (1890–1959), Prime Minister of Laos
- Raymond Dronne (1908–1991), French resistance fighter
- Pierre Messmer (1916–2007), French Prime Minister and colonial administrator
- Hamani Diori (1916–1989), first President of the Republic of Niger
- Gabriel Lisette (1919–2001), Chadian statesman
- Yves de Daruvar (1921–2018), French administrator
- Pierre Alexandre (1922–1994), French anthropologist
- Charles Assemekang (1926–1999), Congolese politician
- Cheikh Hamidou Kane (1928–), Senegalese writer
- Babacar Ba (1930–2006), Senegalese statesman
- Habib Thiam (1933–2017), Senegalese statesman
- Paul Biya (1933–), president of Cameroon
- Gervais Djondo (1934–), Togolese entrepreneur
- Abdou Diouf (1935–), second President of Senegal
- Adamou Ndam Njoya (1942–2020), Cameroonian politician
- Enrique Peñalosa (1954–), Mayor of Bogotá, Colombia
- Brahim Djamel Kassali (1954–), Algerian Minister of Finance
- Michel Gallin-Douathe (1920–1989), Central African diplomat and politician
- Benjamin Bounkoulou (1942-2023), Minister of foreign affairs of the Republic of Congo
- Louis Kpado (1940-), Central African bureaucrat and politician

== See also ==
- Institut national des langues et civilisations orientales
- Archives nationales d'outre-mer
