= Pierre Alexandre (anthropologist) =

French anthropologist and linguist

- Born: 1922; Algiers
- Died: 1994 (aged 71–72)
- Occupations: Anthropologist and linguist

Academic work
- Main interests: Anthropology and linguistics

Pierre Alexandre (1922 – 1994) was a French anthropologist and linguist.

== Biography ==
Born Pierre Hippolyte Henri Charles Alexandre in Algiers, he spent his childhood in mainland France. Alexandre studied at the Lycée Carnot in Paris. In 1943, he qualified for entry into the École nationale de la France d'Outre-Mer.

He was a colonial administrator in Cameroon and Togo. After the colonies gained independence, he returned to Paris, where he became lecturer at INALCO and taught Bantu languages.
