= Dieudonné Ganga =

Congolese political figure and diplomat

Dieudonné-Antoine Ganga (born 1945) is a Congolese political figure and diplomat. He briefly served in the government of Congo-Brazzaville as Minister of Foreign Affairs in 1992.

== Information ==
In 1992, Ganga briefly served in the transitional government headed by André Milongo as Minister of Foreign Affairs. Later, he was later appointed by President Pascal Lissouba as the Congo-Brazzaville's Ambassador to the United States from April 1996 to 1997.

After arriving in the United States capital of Washington, D.C., on 22 April 1996, Ganga presented his credentials to President Bill Clinton on 30 April 1996. As Ambassador, he focused on attracting American investors to Congo. Following the June–October 1997 civil war, in which Lissouba was ousted, Serge Mombouli took over as chargé d'affaires.

He currently resides in the Washington DC area, teaching advanced French classes at the Alliance Francaise in Washington.

| Preceded by Jean-Blaise Kololo | Foreign Minister of the Republic of the Congo; 1992 | Succeeded by Benjamin Bounkoulou |
