= Pouloubou =

- Town
- Location in Central African Republic
- Coordinates: 5°7′19″N 21°38′11″E
- Country: Central African Republic
- Prefecture: Basse-Kotto
- Sub-prefecture: Mingala
- Commune: Kotto

Population (2019)
  - Total: 10,000

Pouloubou, also known as Mbo-Pouloubou, is a town situated in Basse-Kotto Prefecture, Central African Republic. The town is known for its gold mine.

== History ==
A clash between two armed groups ensued in Pouloubou on 30 August 2017. A fire incident broke out in the town from 15 to 16 February 2019, affecting 24,4% of the residents.

In 2020, Pouloubou was isolated and had a security issue. FACA soldiers and Wagner members attacked the UPC position in the town on 30 September 2021. MINUSCA and the Central African police captured the town on 10 May 2022. Pouloubou was reportedly under control of UPC rebels in February 2024.

== Economy ==
There is a gold mine in the town, which was opened in 1932. The mine was abandoned in an unknown year since it produced a small amount of gold. However, it was later reopened in an unknown year. The town also has a market.

== Education ==
Pouloubou has a school.

== Healthcare ==
The town has health facility.

== Notable people ==
- Louis Kpado (born 1940), Minister of Interior (1970–1971) and Mayor of Bangui (1970–1971)
