= Charles Assemekang =

Congolese politician (1926–1999)

Charles Assemekang (16 June 1926 – 8 December 1999) was a Congolese politician.

== Biography ==
Charles Assemekang was born in Souanké on 16 June 1926. He was educated at the Institut des hautes études d'Outre-Mer and obtained a doctorate in law. He became president of the Supreme Court of the Republic of the Congo. In 1969 he was named Minister of Foreign Affairs. He was also a Central Committee member of the Congolese Party of Labour. In December 1971 his political career was cut short, as he was expelled from the party for 'occult practices'. He died in Bondy, France on 8 December 1999, at the age of 73.
