= Minister of Foreign Affairs (Republic of the Congo) =

Foreign minister of Congo-Brazzaville

Minister of Foreign Affairs of the Republic of the Congo (French: Ministre des Affaires étrangères de la République du Congo) (known as the People's Republic of the Congo in 1969–92) is a government minister in charge of the Ministry of Foreign Affairs of the Republic of the Congo, responsible for conducting foreign relations of the country.

The following is a list of foreign ministers of the Republic of the Congo since its founding in 1960:

No.	Name (Birth–Death)	Portrait	Tenure
Republic of the Congo (1960–1969)
1	Stéphane Tchichelle (1915–1984)		1960–1963
2	Charles David Ganao (1926–2012)		1963–1968
3	Nicolas Mondjo (1933–1996)		1968–1969
People's Republic of the Congo (1969–1992)
4	Charles Assemekang (1926–1999)		1969–1970
5	Auxence Ickonga (1937–1989)		1970–1971
6	Henri Lopès (1937–2023)		1971–1973
(2)	Charles David Ganao (1926–2012)		1973–1975
7	Théophile Obenga (b. 1936)		1975–1979
8	Pierre Nzé (b. 1939)		1979–1984
9	Antoine Ndinga Oba (1941–2005)		1984–1991
10	Jean-Blaise Kololo (1952?–1999)		1991–1992
Republic of the Congo (1992–present)
11	Dieudonné Ganga (b. 1945?)		1992
12	Benjamin Bounkoulou (1942–2023)		1992–1995
13	Arsène Tsaty-Boungou (b. 1952)		1995–1997
14	Rodolphe Adada (b. 1946)		1997–2007
15	Basile Ikouébé (b. 1946)		2007–2015
16	Jean-Claude Gakosso (b. 1957)		2015–present
