= Jean-Claude Gakosso =

Congolese politician

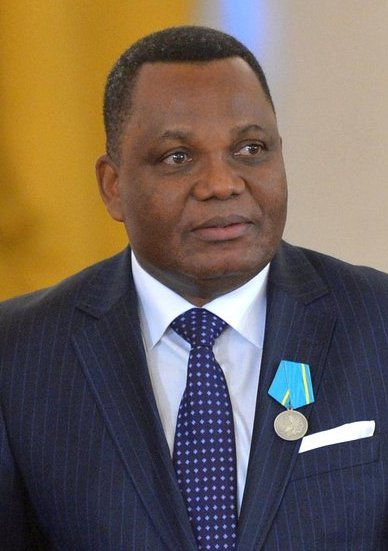
- Jean-Claude Gakosso in 2015

Minister of Foreign Affairs
- Incumbent
- Assumed office 10 August 2015
- President: Denis Sassou Nguesso
- Preceded by: Basile Ikouébé

Minister of Culture and Arts
- In office 18 August 2002 – 10 August 2015
- Preceded by: Mambou Aimée Gnali

Personal details
- Born: 25 July 1957 (age 69)
- Party: Congolese Labour Party
- Education: Sorbonne

Jean-Claude Gakosso (born 25 July 1957) is a Congolese politician who has served in the government of the Republic of the Congo as Minister of Foreign Affairs since 2015. Previously, he was Minister of Culture and the Arts from 2002 to 2015.

== Professional and political career ==
Gakosso, an ethnic Mbochi, was born in Inkouélé, located in the Gamboma District of Plateaux Region, He graduated with a degree in journalism from Leningrad State University in 1983, then joined Sorbonne in France. He was a lecturer on journalism at the Marien Ngouabi University in Brazzaville, and in 1995 he criticized a press law passed by the National Assembly, accusing the government of "working to restrict press freedom". After the June–October 1997 civil war, he was Special Adviser for Communication, Posts, and Telecommunications to President Denis Sassou Nguesso from 1997 to 2002.

On 18 August 2002, he was appointed to the government as Minister of Culture, Arts, and Tourism; he succeeded Mambou Aimée Gnali at the head of that ministry on 22 August.

In a ceremony at the Marien Ngouabi Mausoleum, Gakosso rekindled the eternal flame commemorating President Marien Ngouabi on 11 November 2002. The flame had been extinguished since the 1997 war. Speaking on the occasion, Gakosso said that he had prioritized the restoration of the flame when he took over as Minister of Culture because "it symbolizes the pain, resistance, self-sacrifice, and courage embodied by President Marien Ngouabi." At the time of the fifth Panafrican Music Festival in Brazzaville in July 2005, Gakosso was President of the Festival's Steering Committee.

While serving as Minister of Culture, Gakosso also served for a time as Interim Minister of Communication and Relations with Parliament, as well as Government Spokesman. His portfolio was reduced in scope on 3 March 2007, when he was appointed as Minister of Culture and the Arts.

In the June 2007 parliamentary election, Gakosso stood as the Congolese Labour Party (PCT) candidate in the Ongogni constituency of Plateaux Region. He replaced Pierre Ngollo as the PCT candidate; although there were rumors of rivalry between the two, Gakosso and Ngollo appeared together when Gakosso announced his candidacy, and Ngollo instead stood as the PCT candidate in the Ouenzé I constituency of Brazzaville. Gakosso won his seat in the first round with 99.72% of the vote. Following the election, he retained his post as Minister of Culture and the Arts in the government appointed on 30 December 2007.

Prior to the July 2009 presidential election, Gakosso was Rapporteur of the National Initiative for Peace (INP), a political association promoting Sassou Nguesso's re-election while stressing the importance of peace.

In the July–August 2012 parliamentary election, Gakosso was again elected to the National Assembly as the PCT candidate in Ongogni; he won the seat in the first round of voting, receiving 95.26% of the vote. He was retained as Minister of Culture and the Arts in the government named after the election, on 25 September 2012.

=== Foreign minister ===
On 10 August 2015, Gakosso was moved to the post of Minister of Foreign Affairs and Cooperation. Gakosso formally succeeded Ikouébé at a ceremony on 25 August 2015. Describing the Foreign Ministry as "the iconic symbol of our sovereignty in the concert of nations" and "the refuge of our dignity in the face of the other peoples of the world", he vowed that in "the best Congolese diplomatic traditions in the service of peace, neighborliness, cooperation and development" he would "continue to promote our country in the world".

Gakosso met with Russia's Minister of Foreign Affairs, Sergei Lavrov, in Moscow on 3 November 2015, and the two reaffirmed the good relations between their countries. Lavrov expressed support for the outcome of Congo-Brazzaville's October 2015 constitutional referendum, which paved the way for Sassou Nguesso to run for another term as President.

After Sassou Nguesso's victory in the March 2016 presidential election, Gakosso sent a letter to the European Union on 9 May 2016 requesting that it recall its ambassador to Congo-Brazzaville, Saskia de Lang, in response to criticism of Sassou Nguesso's re-election.

As part of a restructuring of Congolese diplomacy, Gakosso sent letters to 16 Congolese ambassadors on 25 January 2017 dismissing them from their posts and recalling them. Gakosso visited Russia in March 2017 and met with Russian Foreign Minister Sergei Lavrov to discuss continued and improved cooperation between their two countries.

== Published work ==
Gakosso's writings include The New Congolese Press: From the Gulag to the Agora (La nouvelle presse congolaise : du goulag à l'agora), published by L'Harmattan in 1997.

== See also ==
- List of current foreign ministers
