= Mambou Aimée Gnali =

Republic of the Congo politician

Minister of Culture and the Arts
- In office 1999–2002
- Succeeded by: Jean-Claude Gakosso

Member of the National Assembly
- In office 1963–1968
- Constituency: Pointe-Noire

Personal details
- Born: 18 October 1935 (age 90) Brazzaville, French Congo

Mambou Aimée Gnali (born 18 October 1935) is a Congolese former politician. In 1963 she became one of the first group of women elected to the National Assembly. She subsequently served as Minister of Culture and the Arts from January 1999 to August 2002.

== Biography ==
A member of the Vili ethnic group, Gnali was born in Brazzaville in October 1935. Her family moved to Nkayi when her father was transferred to the city. After two years of schooling in Pointe-Noire, she started attending the Sisters of Saint-Joseph de Cluny boarding school in Brazzaville. In 1947, she transferred to the Jeanne d'Arc high school in Orléans in France. However, she was expelled and returned to Congo in 1952, completing her education at the Savorgnan de Brazza school and becoming the first girl in French Equatorial Africa to earn a baccalaureate. She returned to France and studied modern literature at the University of Paris, where she joined the Black African Students Federation in France, becoming a member of its executive committee.

After earning her diploma, making her one of the first Congolese women to gain a university degree, she returned to Congo in September 1963 and began teaching at a high school in Pointe-Noire. However, having become a member of the National Movement of the Revolution (MNR), she was a candidate for the party in the December 1963 parliamentary elections. With no opposition contesting the elections, she was elected to the National Assembly from the Pointe-Noire constituency, becoming one of the first group of three women to enter parliament.

After being rejected for a teaching post at a school in Brazzaville in 1965, she moved to the United States to continue her education, completing courses at Lawrence University, Saint Louis University and Columbia University. After returning to Congo in 1967, she was appointed Director General of the Department of Education in 1968, holding the post until the following year. She also taught at the École normale supérieure in Brazzaville until joining UNESCO in 1971. She oversaw education projects in several African countries, living in Paris until 1978 and then Dakar until 1991.

After returning to Congo, she was elected to the municipal council of Pointe-Noire in 1992, becoming deputy mayor in 1995. In January 1999 she was appointed Minister of Culture and the Arts, in charge of Tourism. Jean-Claude Gakosso was appointed to replace her on 18 August 2002. She subsequently joined the Party pour l'Alternance Democratique, becoming its secretary general.
