= Serge Mombouli =

Congolese diplomat

His Excellency Serge Mombouli
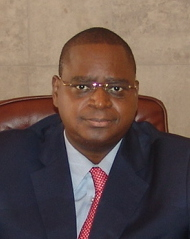

Republic of the Congo Ambassador to the United States
- In office 31 July 2001 – 5 september 2025
- President: Denis Sassou Nguesso
- Preceded by: Dieudonne-Antoinne Ganga

Serge Mombouli (July 22, 1959 – September 5, 2025) was the Republic of the Congo's ambassador to the United States from 2001 until his death in September 2025. He lived in Washington, D.C. He has six children and was married to Stella Mombouli.

== Education ==
Serge Mombouli graduated with a degree in corporate law from the National Conservatory of Arts and Professions in Paris, France.

== Career ==
Mombouli’s career began in the private sector, where he worked in corporate sales for Air Afrique in Paris. He later became vice president of the A.W.E. Group in Houston, Texas. In 1995, he joined Transworld Consortium Corporation, also in Houston, as vice president for international operations and project development and owned P.I. Travel Corporation. He worked in the oil and gas business, facilitating contract negotiations for corporations in Japan, South Africa and other countries.

His diplomatic career in Washington started in 1997, when he was named the Republic of Congo’s chargé d’affaires, before being appointed ambassador to the United States in July 2001.

In an interview on NPR's All Things Considered broadcast in June 2007, he stated: "Tangible development means you can see, you can touch. We need both. We cannot be talking just about democracy, transparency, good governance. At the end of the day the population does not have anything to eat, does not have water to drink, no electricity at night, industry to provide work, so we need both. People do not eat democracy." This comment was quoted in Foreign Policy's Passport blog and in the book La Chinafrique by French journalists Serge Michel and Michel Beuret.

On August 31, 2015, Mombouli became Dean of the African Diplomatic Corps to the United States.

== Death ==
Serge Mombouli died in Washington on September 5 at the age of 66 after an illness.

Diplomatic posts
| Preceded by Dieudonne-Antoinne Ganga | Ambassador of the Republic of the Congo to the United States; 2001–2025 | Incumbent |
| Preceded by Roble Olhaye | Dean of the African Diplomatic Corps in the United States; 2015–2025 | Incumbent |
