= Diplomatic corps =

Body of foreign diplomats accredited to one country or body

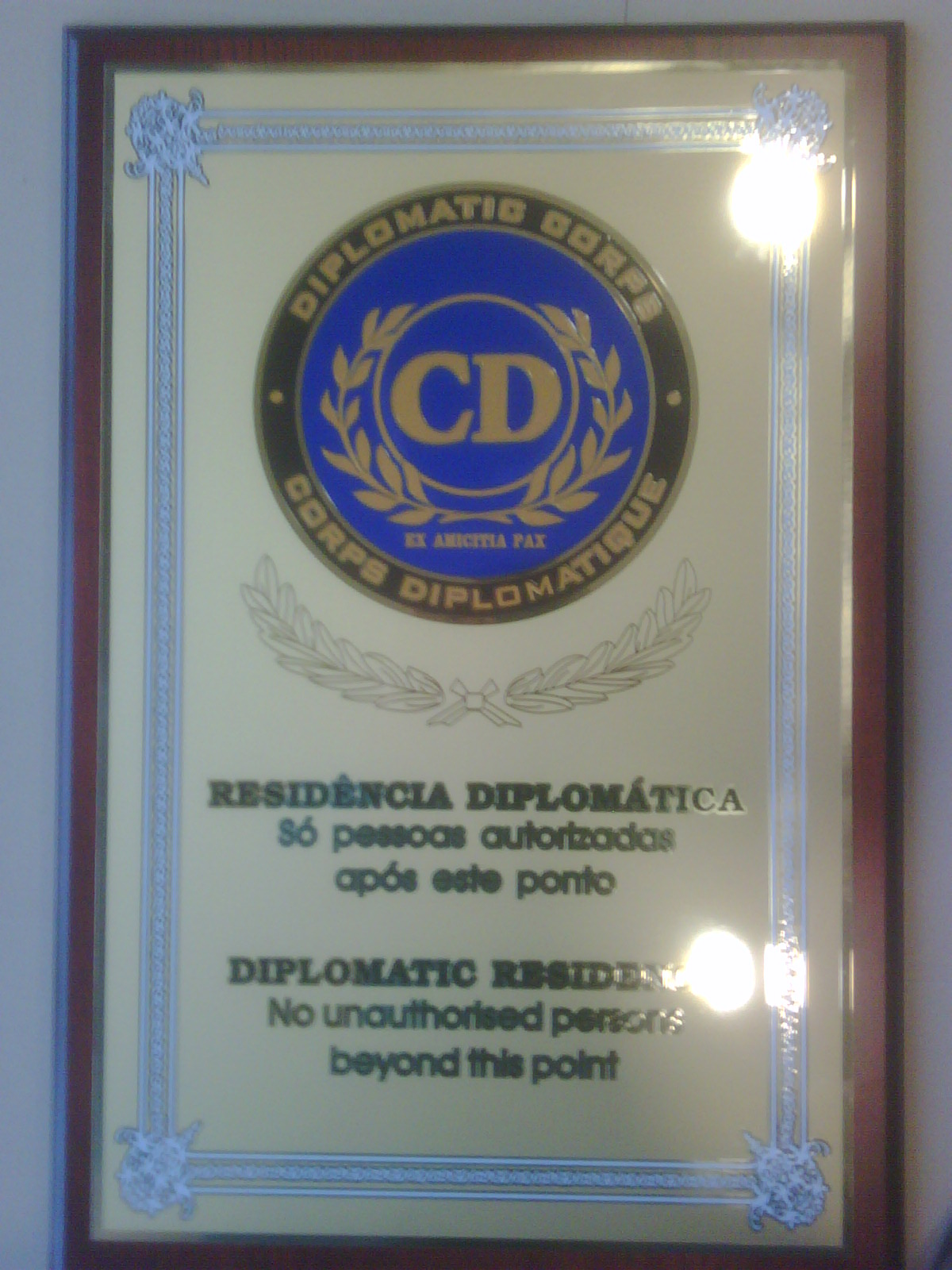
Diplomatic corps plaque used on some embassies and diplomatic missions

The diplomatic corps (French: corps diplomatique) is the collective body of foreign diplomats accredited to a particular country or body.

The diplomatic corps may, in certain contexts, refer to the collection of accredited heads of mission (ambassadors, high commissioners, nuncios and others) who represent their countries in another state or country. As a body, they usually only assemble to attend state functions like a coronation, inauguration, national day or State Opening of Parliament, depending on local custom. They may also assemble in the royal or presidential palace to give their own head of state's New Year greeting to the head of state of the country in which they are based.

The term is sometimes confused with the collective body of diplomats from a particular country—the proper term for which is diplomatic service. The diplomatic corps is not always given any formal recognition by its host country, but can be referenced by official orders of precedence.

In many countries, and especially in Africa, the heads and the foreign members of the country offices of major international organizations (United Nations agencies, the European Union, the International Committee of the Red Cross, agencies of the African Union, etc.) are considered members—and granted the rights and privileges—of the diplomatic corps.

Diplomatic vehicles in most countries have distinctive diplomatic license plates, often with the prefix or suffix CD, the abbreviation for the French corps diplomatique.

== Doyen of the Diplomatic Corps ==
In most countries, the longest-serving ambassador to a country is given the title Doyen of the Diplomatic Corps (French: Doyen du Corps Diplomatique). The doyen is often accorded a high position in the order of precedence. In New Zealand, for example, the doyen takes precedence over figures such as the deputy prime minister and former governors-general.

In many countries that have Catholicism as the official or dominant religion, the apostolic nuncio (the diplomatic representative of the Holy See) serves as doyen by virtue of his office, regardless of seniority; in other cases, the nuncio is treated as an ordinary ambassador of the Holy See and has no special precedence. The Congress of Vienna and the Vienna Convention on Diplomatic Relations provided that any country may choose to give nuncios a different precedence than other ambassadors.

The diplomatic corps may also cooperate amongst themselves on a number of matters, including certain dealings with the host government. In practical terms, the doyen of the diplomatic corps may have a role to play in negotiating with local authorities regarding the application of aspects of the Vienna Convention on Diplomatic Relations and diplomatic immunity, such as the payment of certain fees or taxes, since the receiving country is required "not to discriminate between states". In this sense, the doyen has the role of representing the entire diplomatic corps for matters that affect the corps as a whole, although this function is rarely formalized.

== See also ==
- African Diplomatic Corps
- Marshal of the Diplomatic Corps (United Kingdom)
- Consular corps
