= Benjamin Bounkoulou =

Congolese politician (1942–2023)

Minister of Foreign Affairs
- In office 1992–1995
- President: Pascal Lissouba
- Prime Minister: André Milongo; Stéphane Maurice Bongho-Nouarra; Claude Antoine Dacosta; Joachim Yhombi-Opango
- Preceded by: Dieudonné Ganga
- Succeeded by: Arsène Tsaty-Boungou

Personal details
- Born: 25 September 1942 Kinkengué, French Congo
- Died: 23 August 2023 (aged 80) Paris, France
- Party: Union for the Republic
- Occupation: Politician

Benjamin Bounkoulou (25 September 1942 – 23 August 2023) was a Congolese politician who served in the government of the Republic of the Congo as Minister of Foreign Affairs from 1992 to 1995 under President Pascal Lissouba. He was President of the Union for the Republic (UR), a political party, from 1995. Bounkoulou was Second Vice-President of the National Transitional Council from 1998 to 2002, and First Vice-President of the Senate from 2002 to 2011. After failing to win re-election to the Senate in 2011, he was instead elected to the National Assembly in 2012 and served as President of the National Assembly's Foreign Affairs Commission.

== Background ==
Bounkoulou was born on 25 September 1942, in Kinkengué, located in southern Congo. He attended the Institut international d’administration publique in Paris, the Hague Academy of International Law and the Geneva Graduate Institute.

== Diplomatic career ==
From 1967 to 1975, Bounkoulou worked at the Ministry of Foreign Affairs; at the ministry, he held the post of Director of Political Affairs. Bounkoulou was Diplomatic Adviser to President Marien Ngouabi from 1975 to 1976. Subsequently, he was Congo's Ambassador to Angola from 1976 to 1979 and was Ambassador to Algeria, Libya, Mauritania, Egypt, and Tunisia from 1978 to 1983. He served as Ambassador to the Organization of African Unity and Ethiopia from 1983 to 1987.

On 19 November 1987, replacing Stanislas Batchi, Bounkoulou was appointed Congo-Brazzaville's Ambassador to the United States; he presented his credentials on 21 December 1987. He was replaced by Roger Issombo in May 1990.

== Political career ==
In 1990, Bounkoulou returned to Congo as Director-General of the Congolese Maritime Transport Company (Socotram) and remained in that post for two years. Pascal Lissouba won the August 1992 presidential election, and after taking office he appointed Bounkoulou to the government as Minister of Foreign Affairs, Cooperation, and Hydrocarbons in September 1992. Bounkoulou left the government in 1995.

When the Union for the Republic (UR) was founded in March 1995, Bounkoulou became its President, and he has led the party since then. The UR was established by members of parliament from Bouenza Region who left the ruling Pan-African Union for Social Democracy (UPADS) and another party in January 1995, complaining of government favoritism towards people from Niari Region, Lékoumou Region, and another part of Bouenza Region.

In the short-lived government of Prime Minister Bernard Kolelas, appointed in September 1997 during the 1997 civil war, Bounkoulou was appointed Minister of Privatisation, in charge of the Inspection générale d'Etat. That government lasted only one month; rebels loyal to Denis Sassou Nguesso captured Brazzaville and Pointe-Noire on 14–15 October 1997, thereby ousting Lissouba and Kolelas.

Bounkoulou was subsequently included as one of the 75 members of the National Transitional Council (CNT), which served as a transitional legislature from 1998 to 2002, and he was designated as Second Vice-President of the CNT. Standing as a UR candidate, Bounkoulou was elected as a Senator from Bouenza Region in the 2002 Senate election, at the end of the transitional period. Subsequently, he was elected as First Vice-President of the Senate on 10 August 2002. Bounkoulou was additionally designated as the head of the Senate's Congo–Egypt friendship group on 13 December 2004.

In the October 2005 Senate election, Bounkoulou was re-elected to the Senate as a UR candidate in Bouenza Region. He received the votes of 64 electors and was tied for the highest total of any of the candidates in Bouenza.

At an extraordinary general assembly of the UR, held in Nkayi on 18 December 2006, Bounkoulou was unanimously re-elected as President of the UR. He was re-elected as First Vice-President of the Senate on 12 August 2008. He headed the African Union's electoral observer mission for Angola's September 2008 parliamentary election; according to Bounkoulou, the vote was "transparent, free and ... in line with the African Union's standards", and he called for the results to be respected.

Shortly before the July 2009 presidential election, Bounkoulou stressed the importance of having a peaceful election and urged the people to behave in a responsible and civic manner so that the election would be an example to Africa and the world. He headed the African Union's observer mission for the October 2009 Tunisian election and expressed approval of the election, saying that voters were not pressured to vote for President Zine El Abidine Ben Ali.

Seeking another term in the Senate in the October 2011 Senate election, Bounkoulou failed to win a seat. His defeat was deemed "the only real surprise" in the results, which saw Sassou Nguesso's Congolese Labour Party (PCT) and other pro-government parties retaining an overwhelming majority in the Senate.

Less than a year after losing his Senate seat, Bounkoulou sought election to the National Assembly instead, standing as the UR candidate in Boko-Songho constituency, located in Bouenza Region, in the July–August 2012 parliamentary election. In the first round, he placed second with 28.45% of the vote, slightly behind Joseph Dadhié Yedikissa of the opposition UPADS, who received 30.13%. However, Bounkoulou won the seat in a second round of voting against Yedikissa, receiving 55.10% of the vote; he described the outcome as "a complete victory, without cheating", although Yedikissa subsequently alleged fraud. Bounkoulou was the only UR candidate to win a seat in the National Assembly; the party had held two seats in the previous legislature. On 19 September 2012, Bounkoulou was designated as President of the National Assembly's Foreign Affairs and Cooperation Commission.

== Death ==
Bounkoulou died in Paris, France on 23 August 2023, at age 80.

Preceded by Dieudonné Ganga	Foreign Minister of the Republic of the Congo; 1992–1995	Succeeded by Arsène Tsaty Boungou
