= Jean-Blaise Kololo =

Congolese politician and diplomat

Jean-Blaise Kololo (1952? – 28 April 1999) was a Congolese politician and diplomat who served in the government of the Republic of the Congo as Minister of Foreign Affairs and Cooperation from 1991 to 1992 as part of the transitional government of Prime Minister André Milongo.

== Political career ==
Kololo, a professor of political science, was a member of the Congolese Movement for Democracy and Integral Development (MCDDI), led by Bernard Kolélas, during the early 1990s, and he participated in the February–June 1991 National Conference. At the National Conference, he was included on the committee for the drafting of internal regulations. At the end of the conference, he was appointed to the transitional government of Prime Minister André Milongo as Minister of Foreign Affairs and Cooperation.

Kololo remained a member of the MCDDI until splitting from it in 1994 to form a new party, the Congolese Alliance for Unity and People's Freedoms (ACULP). He was then appointed as High Commissioner for Human Rights by President Pascal Lissouba. In the midst of the June–October 1997 civil war, he urged France to not recognize any "political leaders with armed militias" in late July 1997.

During the December 1998 violence in Brazzaville, Kololo fled the city's Bacongo neighborhood and spent three months hiding in the Pool Region before arriving across the Congo River in Kinshasa; he was "in a state of total exhaustion" by that point and was hospitalized in Kinshasa. An emissary of President Denis Sassou Nguesso offered to pay for Kololo to be evacuated to Europe for urgent medical treatment, but the Belgian airline Sabena refused to accept him as a passenger on 27 April 1999 out of concern that he would die during the flight. Kololo then died of amoebic dysentery in Kinshasa on the next day, on 28 April.

Preceded by Antoine Ndinga Oba	Foreign Minister of the Republic of the Congo; 1991-1992	Succeeded by Dieudonné Ganga
