= Basile Ikouébé =

Congolese ambassador

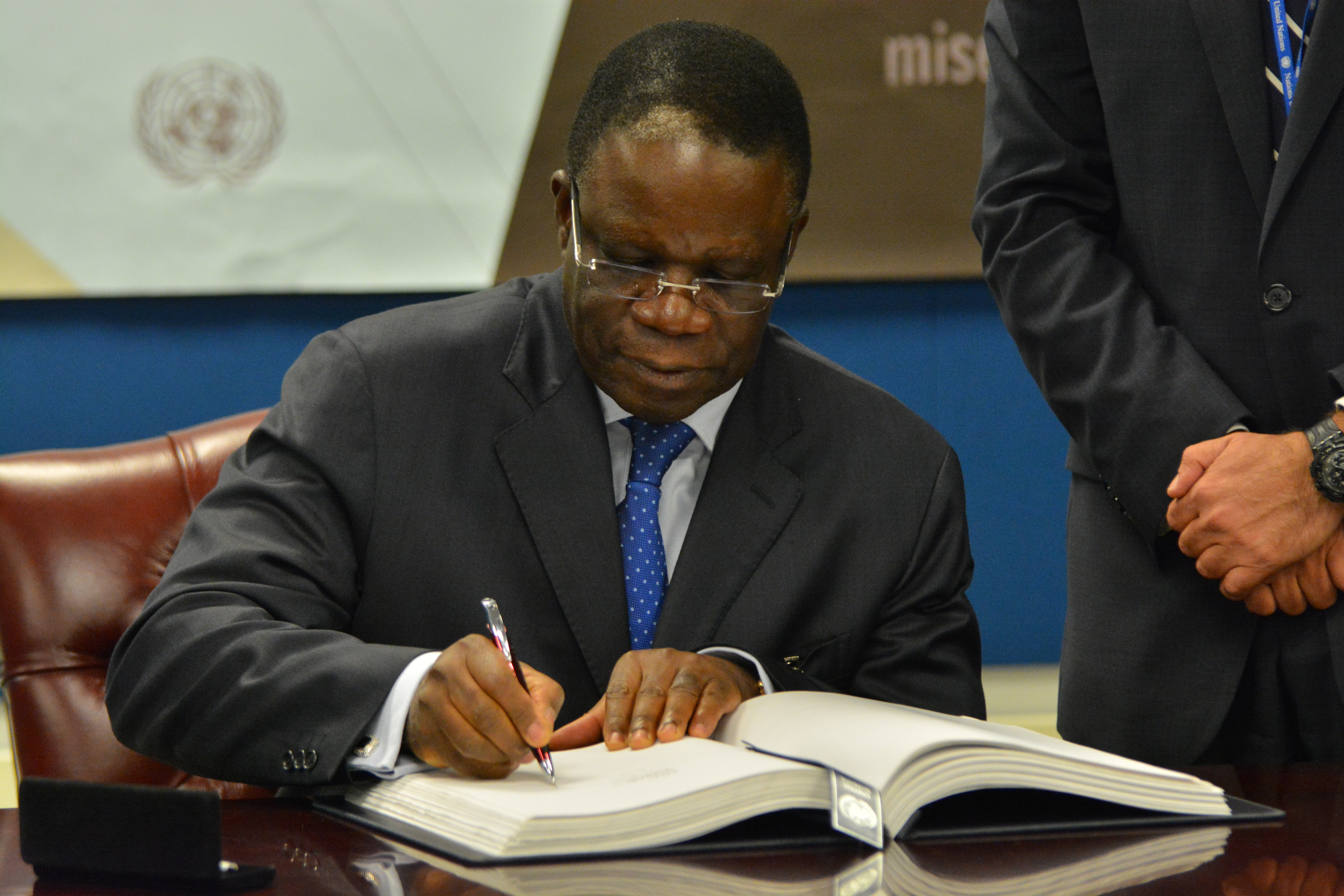

Minister of Foreign Affairs
- In office 31 May 2007 – 10 August 2015
- President: Denis Sassou Nguesso
- Preceded by: Rodolphe Adada
- Succeeded by: Jean-Claude Gakosso

Personal details
- Born: 1 July 1946 (age 80)
- Children: 6
- Education: École nationale d'administration Institut d'études politiques de Bordeaux

Basile Ikouébé (born 1 July 1946 in Congo-Brazzaville) is a Congolese former ambassador who is Special representative of the President of the African Union Commission for the Great Lakes region, Head of the Liaison Office for Burundi since October 2017.

== Diplomatic career ==
Previously, he held the following offices:

- Minister of Foreign Affairs and Cooperation (2007 - 2015);

- Ambassador, Permanent Representative of Congo to the United Nations

in New York (1998 - 2007);

- Permanent Secretary of the Ministry of Foreign Affairs (1996 - 1998);

- Itinerant Ambassador (1994 - 1996);

- Diplomatic Advisor, then, cumulatively; Minister-Chief of Cabinet of the

President of the Republic (1982 – 1992);

- Permanent Secretary, Ministry of Foreign Affairs (1977 - 1979);

- Chief of Staff, Ministry of Foreign Affairs (1975 - 1977).

Higher studies in Modern Literature, political science and international relations in Brazzaville, Bordeaux and Paris.

Married, father of 6 children.

== See also ==
- Foreign relations of the Republic of the Congo

Preceded by Rodolphe Adada	Minister of Foreign Affairs of Congo-Brazzaville; 2007–2015	Succeeded by Jean-Claude Gakosso
