= Diplomatic vehicle registration plate =

Diplomatic vehicle license plates

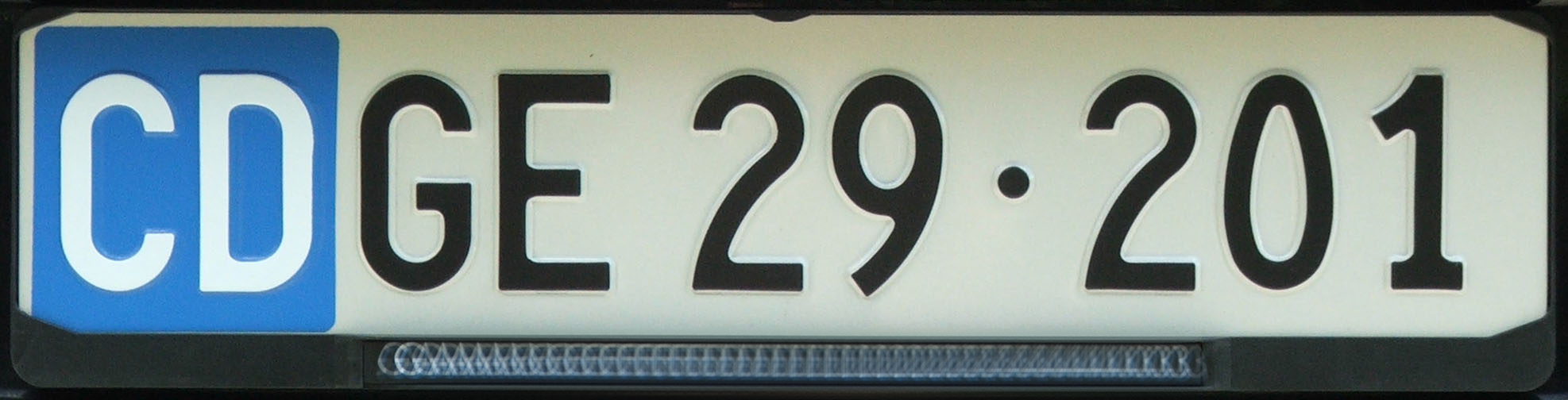
Swiss diplomatic plate

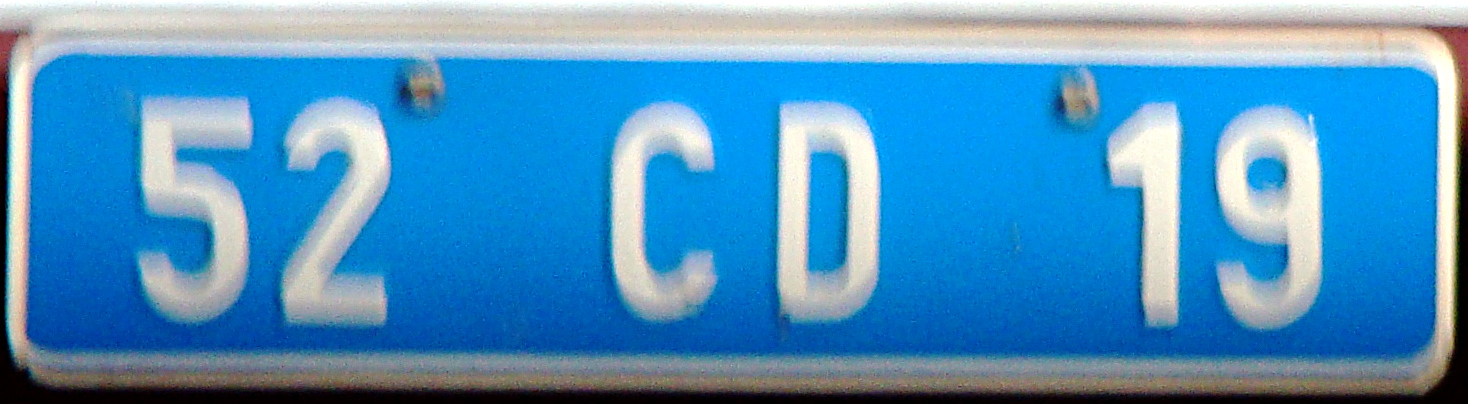
Indian vehicle registration plate of a car belonging to the diplomatic mission of The Netherlands (code 52)

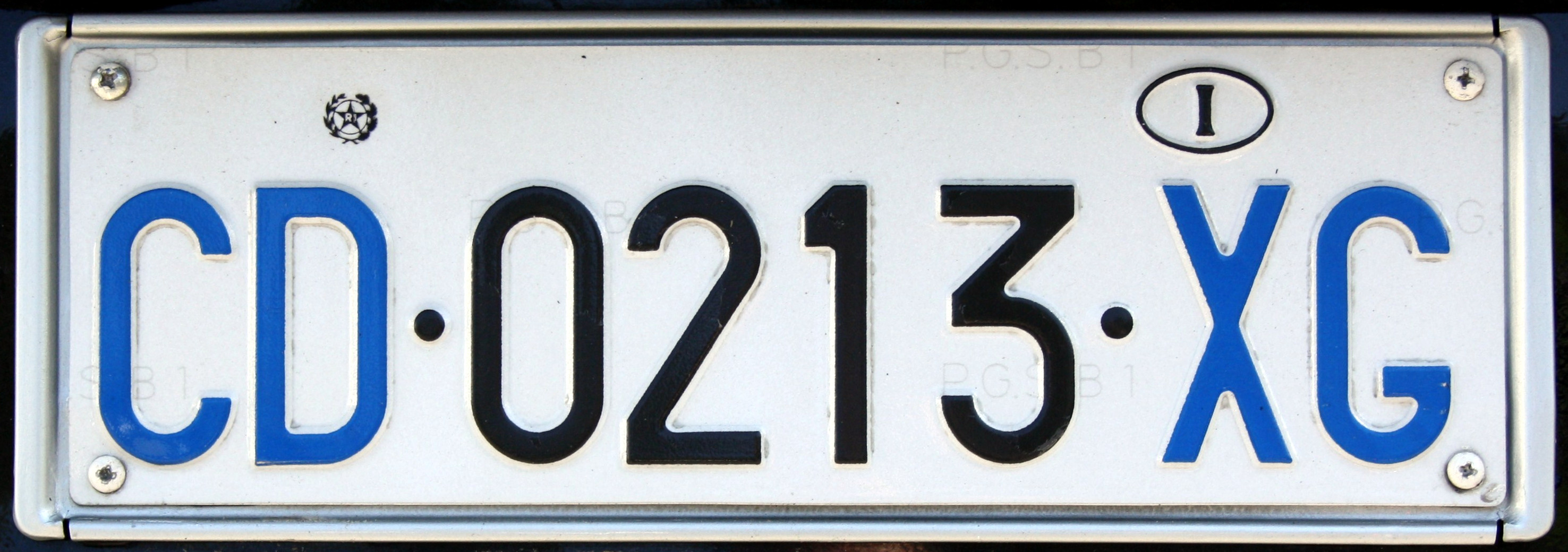
Italian diplomatic plate, XG is the code of Vatican City

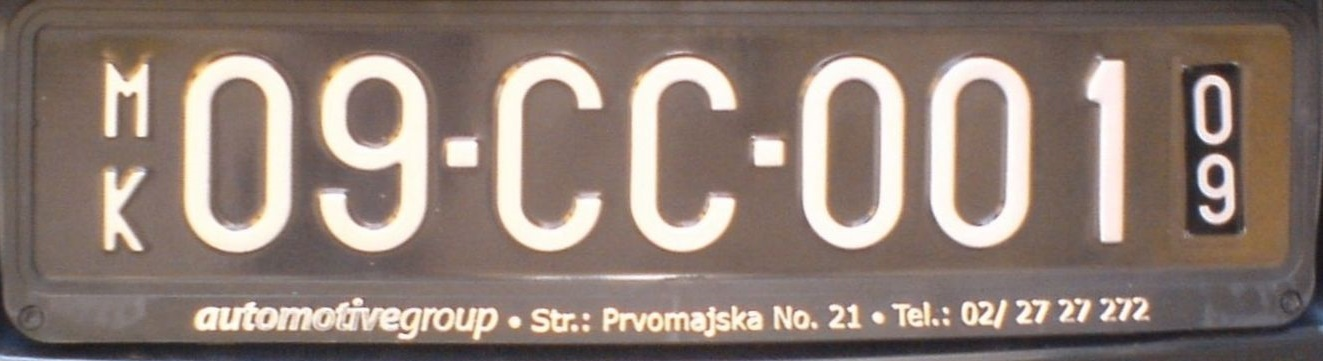
North Macedonian diplomatic plate

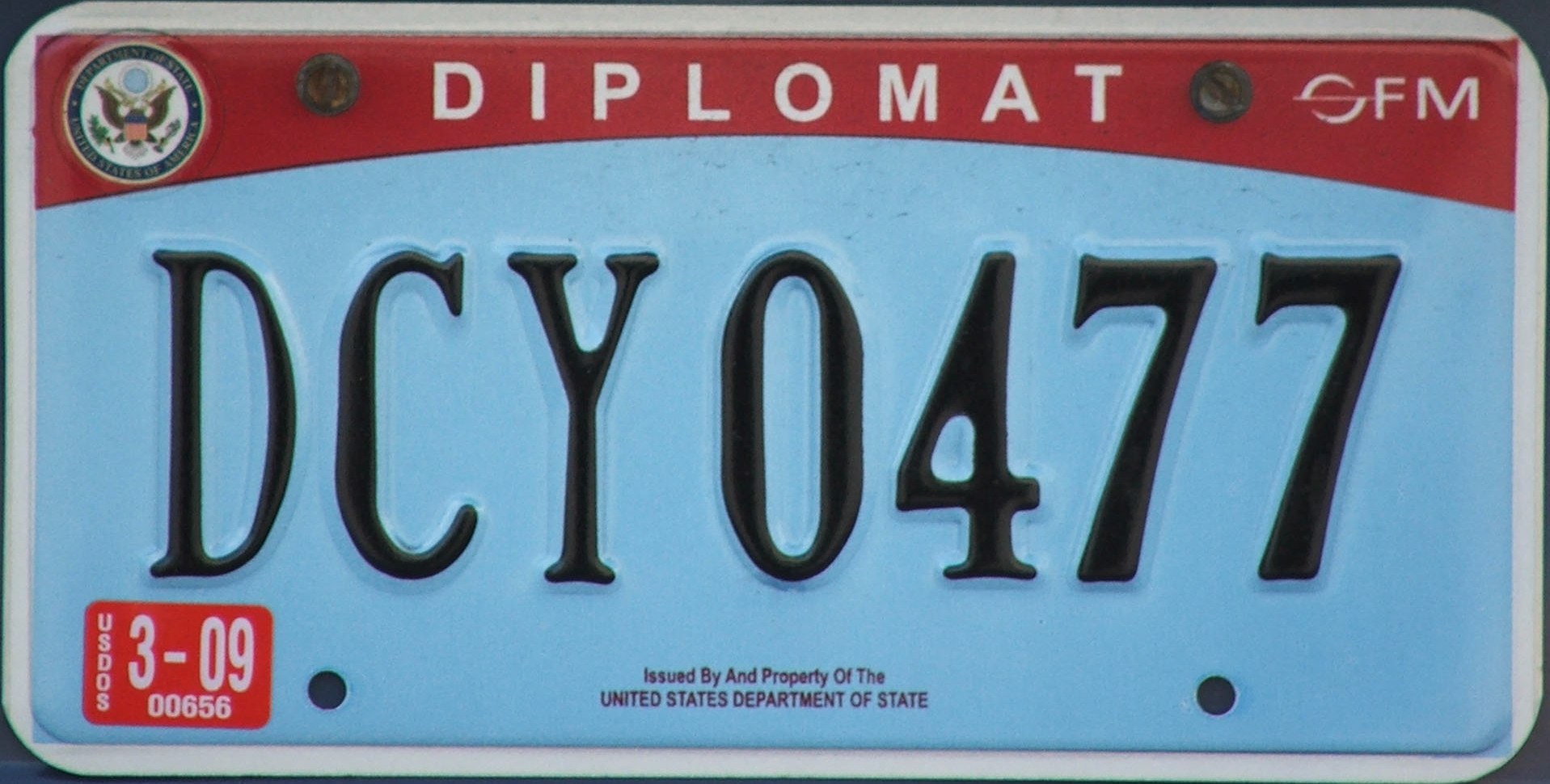
Current-style U.S. diplomatic plate, issued since the late 2000s ("CY" for a Chinese diplomat).

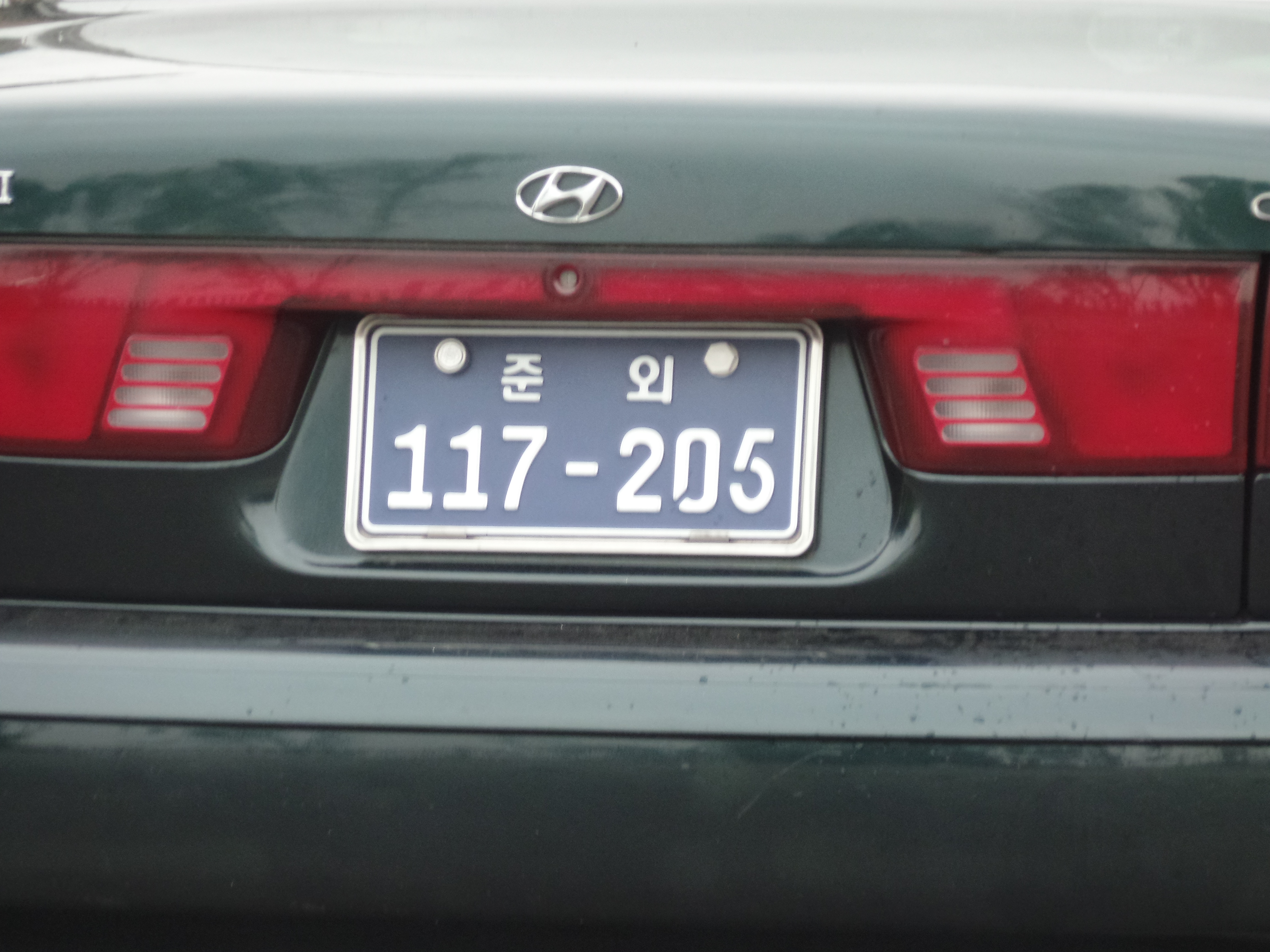
South Korean diplomatic license plate issued in North American aspect ratio

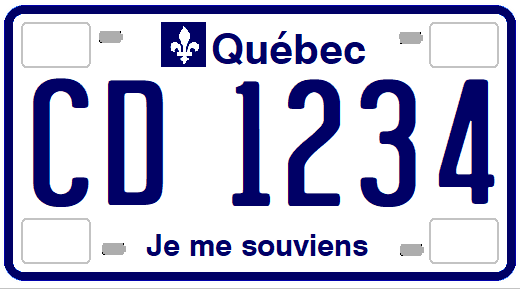
Québecois diplomatic plate

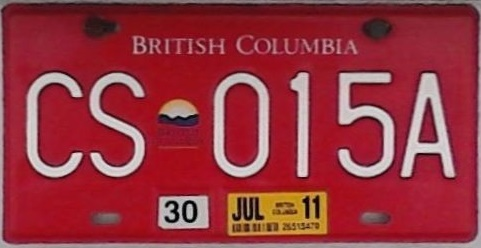
British Columbian consular plate

Most countries issue diplomatic vehicle registration plates to accredited diplomats. These are special vehicle registration plates which typically have distinctive features to allow diplomatic vehicles to be distinguished from other vehicles by police and other bodies, allowing them to give diplomatic vehicles special treatment and warning them that the operators and passengers of those vehicles may have diplomatic immunity.

== Conventions ==
Conventions on the format of diplomatic license plates vary from country to country. They often feature the letters "CD" (for "corps diplomatique"), “CC” (for “corps consulaire”), "D" (for "diplomat") or prefix of international organizations with diplomatic privileges, such as "EU" (for "European Union") and "OSCE" (for Organization for Security and Co-operation in Europe").

== Criticism ==
Critics of these plates say that operators of these vehicles abuse these privileges, often parking in illegal spaces and breaking vehicular law without fear of repercussion.

In 2019, in Japan, 2,600 parking violations involved diplomatic cars, out of which only 25% paid the fine. There are around 1900 cars with diplomatic license plates in Japan. In Washington, D.C., from 2002 to 2019, cars with diplomatic plates have accumulated $745,280 in unpaid traffic and parking tickets, Including in Thailand, where diplomatic license plates have poor traffic discipline by violating various traffic laws, which has been criticized on Pantip.com and mentioned in the media during the year 2014.
