= Zainab Bangura =

Sierra Leonean politician and activist

Zainab Hawa Bangura
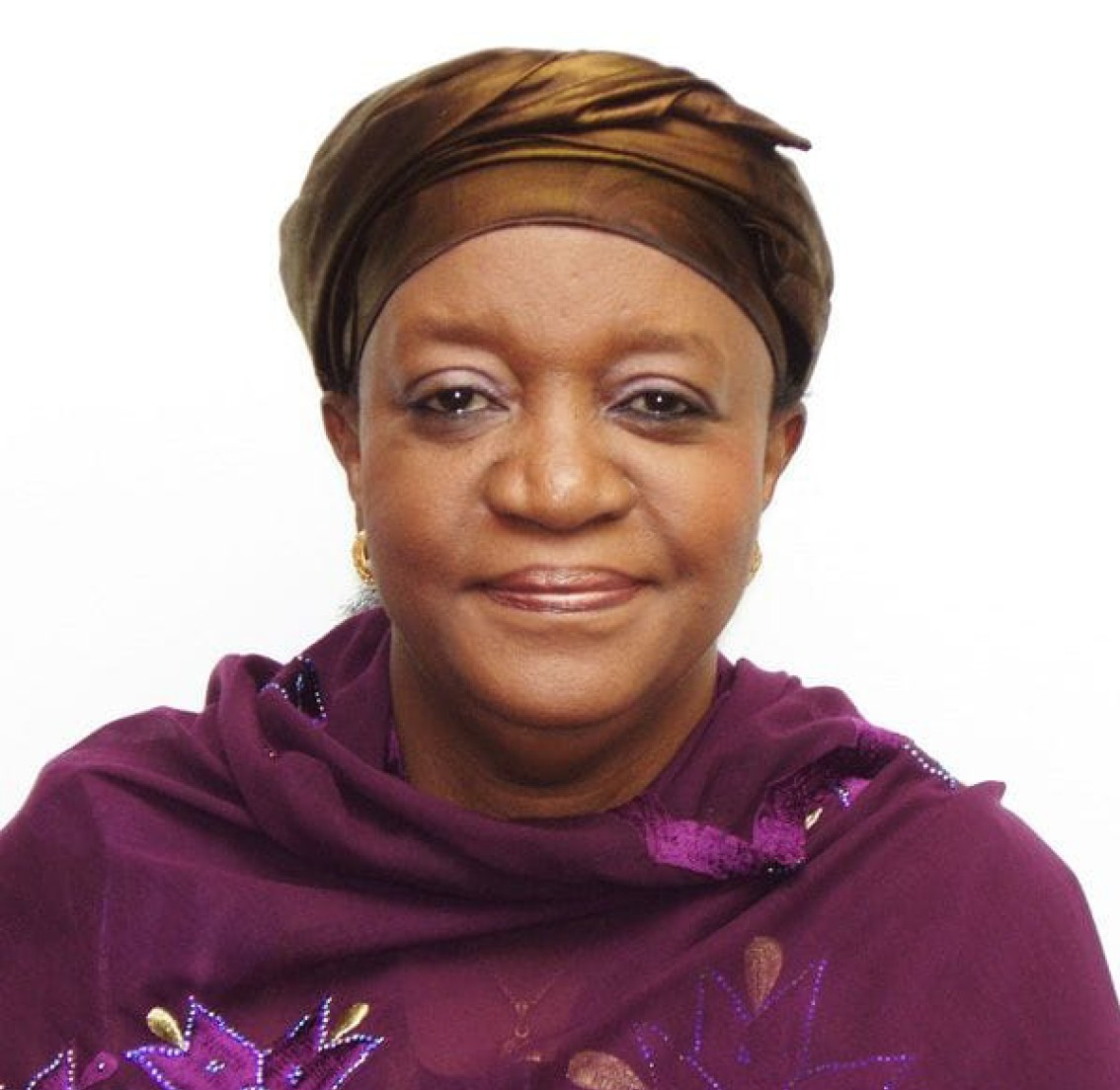
- Bangura in 2013

Director-General, United Nations Office at Nairobi
- Incumbent
- Assumed office January 2020
- Preceded by: Hanna Tetteh

United Nations Special Representative on Sexual Violence in Conflict
- In office 2 September 2012 – 31 March 2017
- Preceded by: Margot Wallström
- Succeeded by: Pramila Patten

Sierra Leone Minister of Health and Sanitation
- In office 10 December 2010 – 1 September 2012
- Preceded by: Soccoh Kabia
- Succeeded by: Tamba Borbor-Sawyer

Sierra Leone Minister of Foreign Affairs
- In office 14 October 2007 – 3 December 2010
- Preceded by: Momodu Koroma
- Succeeded by: Joseph Bandabla Dauda

Personal details
- Born: Zainab Hawa Sesay; 18 December 1959 (age 66) Yonibana, Tonkolili District, Sierra Leone
- Party: All People's Congress (APC)
- Spouse: The Late Shekie Gibril Bangura
- Children: Ibrahim Bangura and Tahira Bangura
- Education: Fourah Bay College-University of Sierra Leone, University of Nottingham City University Business School of London
- Profession: Social activist

Haja Zainab Hawa Bangura (/ˈzaɪnəb ˈhɑːwə bəŋˈɡuːrə/; born 18 December 1959) is a Sierra Leonean politician and social activist who has been serving as the Director-General of the United Nations Office at Nairobi (UNON) since 2018, appointed by United Nations Secretary-General António Guterres. She served as the second United Nations Special Representative on Sexual Violence in Conflict at the level of Under-Secretary-General of the United Nations from 2012 to 2017, in succession to the first holder of the post, Margot Wallström. In 2017 she was succeeded by Pramila Patten.

In 2007, Bangura became Sierra Leone's foreign minister in the government of President Ernest Bai Koroma of the All People's Congress (APC) Party. She was the second woman to serve in that post, following Shirley Gbujama who held that position from 1996 to 1997. She served as Minister of Health and Sanitation from 2010 to 2012.

== Early life ==
The daughter of an imam, Zainab Hawa Bangura was born "Zainab Hawa Sesay" in the small rural town of Yonibana, Tonkolili District in the Northern Province of British Sierra Leone. She hails from the Temne ethnic group. She was born into a family of limited means, and she attended secondary school on a scholarship that was awarded to her by the Government of Sierra Leone. She later attended the Annie Walsh Memorial Girls Secondary School in the capital city of Freetown.

Then, after graduating from Sierra Leone's Fourah Bay College, Bangura moved to the United Kingdom for advanced Diplomas in Insurance Studies and Insurance Management at the University of Nottingham and the City University Business School of London respectively. While in her early 30s, she became the second most senior official of the 3rd Largest Insurance company in the country - Reliance Insurance Trust Corporation (Ritcorp).

Bangura speaks three languages: Temne, Krio, and English. She has lived and worked in several cities, including Freetown, Sierra Leone; Nottingham, London, United Kingdom; Conakry, Guinea; Monrovia, Liberia; New York City, United States; and Nairobi, Kenya.

== Public life ==
=== Early activism ===
Bangura became a social activist during the difficult period when Sierra Leone was ruled by the NPRC military junta. She began with consciousness-raising efforts among urban market women, reminding her followers that her own mother was a market woman. In 1995, she and lawyer Yasmin Jusu-Sheriff founded Women Organized for a Morally Enlightened Nation (W.O.M.E.N.). She campaigned for the holding of national elections that finally drove the NPRC from power in 1996 and restored democratic government after almost 3 decades. This was Sierra Leone's first democratic election in 25 years, and the Sierra Leonean media and the general public attributed that success largely to her efforts. She co-founded the Campaign for Good Governance(CGG) for the consolidation of the democratic governance after the election of 1996, building of democratic institutions, monitoring, documenting and reporting on the human rights violation committed during the war and the promotion of the empowerment of women.

During Sierra Leone's civil war (1991–2002) Bangura spoke out forcefully against the atrocities committed against the civilian population by the Revolutionary United Front (RUF) and was targeted for assassination several times by that group. She also spoke against the corruption in the civilian government of President Ahmad Tejan Kabbah and the atrocities committed against civilians by government soldiers. In June 1997, as fighting engulfed the country, Bangura fled on a fishing boat to neighbouring Guinea.

=== Political career ===
In the 2002 elections, Bangura ran against Kabbah for the presidency of Sierra Leone, departing for the first time from her accustomed role as a non-partisan civil society activist. She won less than one percent of the vote, and her Movement for Progress (MOP) party failed to gain any seats in Sierra Leone's parliament. Bangura claimed that her party's low vote count resulted from corruption in the voting system.

After the 2002 elections Bangura founded the National Accountability Group (NAG) which later became Transparency International Sierra Leone (TISL), whose mission was to fight against official corruption and to promote transparency and accountability in government. In 2006 she left Sierra Leone for neighbouring Liberia where she was appointed Director of the Civil Affairs Office in the United Nations Mission in Liberia (UNMIL) and given responsibility for the reconstruction of 16 Liberian ministries and 30 government agencies following that country's devastating civil war.

Bangura returned to Sierra Leone in 2007 after Ernest Bai Koroma won the presidency in a hard-fought national election and was named foreign minister shortly thereafter. At the time, many Sierra Leoneans believed that the new president elevated this well known critic of government to such a high position to demonstrate his good faith in promising reform.

As a devoted Muslim, Bangura took time off politics in 2009 to travel to the Holy city of Mecca in Saudi Arabia to participate in her first Hajj in 2009 Hajj pilgrimage ceremony.

=== Career in international politics ===
In 2012, Bangura served on the United Nations Commission on Life-Saving Commodities, which was jointly chaired by Goodluck Jonathan and Jens Stoltenberg, and issued recommendations to increase access to and use of 13 essential commodities for women's and children's health.

Bangura subsequently assumed her next position as Special Representative of the Secretary-General on Sexual Violence in Conflict at the level of Under-Secretary-General on 4 September 2012. In this capacity, she also chaired the interagency network UN Action Against Sexual Violence in Conflict. During her time in office, she helped launch an international protocol in 2014 for dealing with rape and sexual violence in conflict, providing guidelines on the investigation of sex crimes and the collection of evidence for future prosecutions. She notably negotiated a June 2015 deal with military commanders in Ivory Coast to prosecute soldiers accused of sexual violence. That same year, she visited Iraq and Syria and worked on an action plan to address the sexual violence being waged by Islamic State of Iraq and the Levant (ISIS) fighters.

From 2018 until 2019, Bangura co-chaired (alongside Katherine Sierra) an Independent Commission on Sexual Misconduct, Accountability and Culture Change at Oxfam. In 2019, the UN Secretary-General Antonio Gutiérrez appointed her as Director-General of the United Nations Office at Nairobi, at the level of the Under Secretary-General of the United Nations.

== Other activities ==
- International Gender Champions (IGC), Member
- Africa Group for Justice and Accountability, Member
- Interpeace, Member of the Governing Board
- United Nations Institute for Training and Research (UNITAR), Member of the Division for Peace Advisory Board
- Women Political Leaders Global Forum (WPL), Member of the Global Advisory Board
- World Movement for Democracy, Chair of the Steering Committee
- International Crisis Group, Board Member

== Recognition ==
Bangura has won several international awards for her promotion of democracy and human rights in Africa, including: the African International Award of Merit for Leadership (Nigeria, 1999); the Human Rights Award given by the Lawyers Committee for Human Rights (New York, 2000); the Bayard Rustin Humanitarian Award given by the A. Philip Randolph Institute (Washington, DC); the Democracy Award given by the National Endowment for Democracy (Washington, DC, 2006); and the Hillary Rodham Clinton Award for Advancing Women in Peace and Security (United States, 2012).

In November 2013, Bangura received an award from Project 1808 Inc, an organisation in partnership with University of Wisconsin Madison African Studies, Division of International Studies. The award recognised Bangura for her effectiveness in bringing attention to the issues surrounding sexual violence throughout the world by engaging fellow world leaders, rebels, militants, victims and communities. In the same year, she was also recognized as one of the BBC's 100 women. and on several occasions has been named among the 100 most influential African women.

Between 2014 and 2019, Bangura received honorary doctorate awards from Ursinus College, Pennsylvania, USA; Oxford Brookes University, UK; the University of Aberdeen, Scotland; Atlantic University, Florida, USA; and Syracuse University, USA

== See also ==
- United Nations Office at Nairobi
- Office of the Special Representative of the Secretary-General on Sexual Violence in Conflict

== Sources ==
- UN brief official biography
- Profile of Zainab Bangura
- BBC television interview on "Hardtalk", 10 May 2013
- Letter from Zainab Bangura to Britain's Commission for Africa, ca. 2002
- Keynote Speech by Zainab Bangura, Durban, South Africa, 2004
- Profile of Zainab Bangura's Performance as Foreign Minister
- Article critical of Zainab Bangura and CGG

Political offices
Preceded by Momodu Koroma	Foreign Minister of Sierra Leone; 2007–2010	Succeeded by J. B. Dauda
