= List of foreign ministers in 1996 =

This is a list of foreign ministers in 1996.

== Africa ==
- Algeria -
  1. Mohamed Salah Dembri (1993-1996)
  2. Ahmed Attaf (1996-1999)
- Angola - Venâncio da Silva Moura (1992-1999)
- Benin -
  1. Edgar Yves Monnou (1995-1996)
  2. Pierre Osho (1996-1998)
- Botswana - Mompati Merafhe (1994-2008)
- Burkina Faso - Ablassé Ouedraogo (1994-1999)
- Burundi -
  1. Vénérand Bakevyumusaya (1995-1996)
  2. Luc Rukingama (1996-1998)
- Cameroon - Ferdinand Oyono (1992-1997)
- Cape Verde -
  1. José Tomás Veiga (1995-1996)
  2. Amílcar Spencer Lopes (1996-1998)
- Central African Republic -
  1. Simon Bedaya-Ngaro (1993-1996)
  2. Michel Gbezera-Bria (1996-1997)
- Chad -
  1. Ahmat Abderahmane Haggar (1994-1996)
  2. Saleh Kebzabo (1996-1997)
- Comoros -
  1. Abdallah Mouzaoir (1995-1996)
  2. Said Omar Said Ahmed (1996-1997)
- Congo - Arsène Tsaty Boungou (1995-1997)
- Côte d'Ivoire - Amara Essy (1990-2000)
- Djibouti - Mohamed Moussa Chehem (1995-1999)
- Egypt - Amr Moussa (1991-2001)
- Equatorial Guinea - Miguel Oyono Ndong Mifumu (1993-1999)
- Eritrea - Petros Solomon (1994-1997)
- Ethiopia - Seyoum Mesfin (1991-2010)
- Gabon - Casimir Oyé-Mba (1994-1999)
- The Gambia - Baboucarr-Blaise Jagne (1995-1997)
- Ghana - Obed Asamoah (1981-1997)
- Guinea -
  1. Kozo Zoumanigui (1994-1996)
  2. Lamine Camara (1996-1999)
- Guinea-Bissau -
  1. Ansumane Mané (1995-1996)
  2. Fernando Delfim da Silva (1996-1999)
- Kenya - Kalonzo Musyoka (1993-1998)
- Lesotho - Kelebone Maope (1995-1998)
- Liberia -
  1. Momolu Sirleaf (1995-1996)
  2. Monie Captan (1996-2003)
- Libya - Umar Mustafa al-Muntasir (1992-2000)
- Madagascar -
  1. Jacques Sylla (1993-1996)
  2. Evariste Marson (1996-1997)
- Malawi -
  1. Edward Bwanali (1994-1996)
  2. George Ntafu (1996-1997)
- Mali - Dioncounda Traoré (1994-1997)
- Mauritania -
  1. Mohamed Salem Ould Lekhal (1994-1996)
  2. Lemrabott Sidi Mahmoud Ould Cheikh Ahmed (1996-1997)
- Mauritius - Paul Bérenger (1995-1997)
- Morocco - Abdellatif Filali (1985-1999)
  - Western Sahara - Malainine Sadik (1995-1997)
- Mozambique - Leonardo Simão (1994-2005)
- Namibia - Theo-Ben Gurirab (1990-2002)
- Niger -
  1. Mohamed Bazoum (1995-1996)
  2. André Salifou (1996)
  3. Ibrahim Hassane Mayaki (1996-1997)
- Nigeria - Tom Ikimi (1995-1998)
- Rwanda - Anastase Gasana (1994-1999)
- São Tomé and Príncipe -
  1. Guilherme Posser da Costa (1994-1996)
  2. Homero Jeronimo Salvaterra (1996-1999)
- Senegal - Moustapha Niasse (1993-1998)
- Seychelles - Danielle de St. Jorre (1989-1997)
- Sierra Leone -
  1. Alusine Fofanah (1995-1996)
  2. Louisin Chaluba (1996)
  3. Maigore Kallon (1996)
  4. Shirley Gbujama (1996-1997)
- Somalia - Abdullahi Sheikh Ismail (?1996?)
  - Somaliland - Sulayman Mahmud Adan (1996)
- South Africa - Alfred Baphethuxolo Nzo (1994-1999)
- Sudan - Ali Osman Taha (1995-1998)
- Swaziland - Arthur Khoza (1995-1998)
- Tanzania - Jakaya Kikwete (1995-2006)
- Togo -
  1. Barry Moussa Barqué (1995-1996)
  2. Koffi Panou (1996-1998)
- Tunisia - Habib Ben Yahia (1991-1997)
- Uganda -
  1. Ruhakana Rugunda (1994-1996)
  2. Eriya Kategaya (1996-2001)
- Zaire -
  1. Gérard Kamanda Wa Kamanda (1995-1996)
  2. Jean-Marie Kititwa (1996)
  3. Gérard Kamanda Wa Kamanda (1996-1997)
- Zambia -
  1. Christon Tembo (1995-1996)
  2. Lawrence Shimba (1996-1997)
- Zimbabwe - Stan Mudenge (1995-2005)

== Asia ==
- Afghanistan -
  1. Najibullah Lafraie (1994-1996)
  2. Abdul Rahim Ghafoorzai (1996)
  3. Mohammad Ghous (1996-1997)
- Armenia -
  1. Vahan Papasyan (1993-1996)
  2. Alexander Arzumanyan (1996-1998)
- Azerbaijan - Hasan Hasanov (1993-1998)
  - Nagorno-Karabakh - Arkadi Ghukasyan (1993-1997)
- Bahrain - Sheikh Muhammad ibn Mubarak ibn Hamad Al Khalifah (1971-2005)
- Bangladesh -
  1. A.S.M. Mostafizur Rahman (1991-1996)
  2. Mohammad Habibur Rahman (1996)
  3. Abdus Samad Azad (1996-2001)
- Bhutan - Dawa Tsering (1972-1998)
- Brunei - Pengiran Muda Mohamed Bolkiah (1984–2015)
- Cambodia - Ung Huot (1994-1998)
- China - Qian Qichen (1988-1998)
- Georgia - Irakli Menagarishvili (1995-2003)
  - Abkhazia -
    1. Leonid Lakerbaia (1995-1996)
    2. Konstantin Ozgan (1996-1997)
- India -
  1. Pranab Mukherjee (1995-1996)
  2. Atal Bihari Vajpayee (1996)
  3. Sikander Bakht (1996)
  4. I. K. Gujral (1996-1998)
- Indonesia - Ali Alatas (1988-1999)
- Iran - Ali Akbar Velayati (1981-1997)
- Iraq - Muhammad Saeed al-Sahhaf (1992-2001)
- Israel -
  1. Ehud Barak (1995-1996)
  2. David Levy (1996-1998)
- Japan -
  1. Yōhei Kōno (1994-1996)
  2. Yukihiko Ikeda (1996-1997)
- Jordan - Abdul Karim al-Kabariti (1995-1997)
- Kazakhstan - Kassym-Jomart Tokayev (1994-1999)
- North Korea - Kim Yong-nam (1983-1998)
- South Korea -
  1. Gong Ro-myeong (1994-1996)
  2. Yu Jong-ha (1996-1998)
- Kuwait - Sheikh Sabah Al-Ahmad Al-Jaber Al-Sabah (1978-2003)
- Kyrgyzstan - Roza Otunbayeva (1994-1997)
- Laos - Somsavat Lengsavad (1993-2006)
- Lebanon - Farès Boueiz (1992-1998)
- Malaysia - Abdullah Ahmad Badawi (1991-1999)
- Maldives - Fathulla Jameel (1978-2005)
- Mongolia -
  1. Tserenpiliyn Gombosüren (1988-1996)
  2. Mendsaikhany Enkhsaikhan (1996-1997)
- Myanmar - Ohn Gyaw (1991-1998)
- Nepal - Prakash Chandra Lohani (1995-1997)
- Oman - Yusuf bin Alawi bin Abdullah (1982–2020)
- Pakistan -
  1. Aseff Ahmad Ali (1993-1996)
  2. Sahabzada Yaqub Khan (1996-1997)
- Philippines - Domingo Siazon, Jr. (1995-2001)
- Qatar - Sheikh Hamad bin Jassim bin Jaber Al Thani (1992-2013)
- Saudi Arabia - Prince Saud bin Faisal bin Abdulaziz Al Saud (1975–2015)
- Singapore - S. Jayakumar (1994-2004)
- Sri Lanka - Lakshman Kadirgamar (1994-2001)
- Syria - Farouk al-Sharaa (1984-2006)
- Taiwan -
  1. Fredrick Chien (1990-1996)
  2. John Chiang (1996-1997)
- Tajikistan - Talbak Nazarov (1994-2006)
- Thailand -
  1. Kasem S. Kasemsri (1995-1996)
  2. Amnuay Viravan (1996)
  3. Thepkamol Devakula (acting) (1996)
  4. Prachuab Chaiyasan (1996-1997)
- Turkey -
  1. Deniz Baykal (1995-1996)
  2. Emre Gönensay (1996)
  3. Tansu Çiller (1996-1997)
- Turkmenistan - Boris Şyhmyradow (1995-2000)
- United Arab Emirates - Rashid Abdullah Al Nuaimi (1980-2006)
- Uzbekistan - Abdulaziz Komilov (1994-2003)
- Vietnam - Nguyễn Mạnh Cầm (1991-2000)
- Yemen - Abd al-Karim al-Iryani (1994-1998)

== Australia and Oceania ==
- Australia -
  1. Gareth Evans (1988-1996)
  2. Alexander Downer (1996-2007)
- Fiji - Filipe Bole (1994-1997)
- Kiribati - Teburoro Tito (1994-2003)
- Marshall Islands - Phillip H. Muller (1994-2000)
- Micronesia -
  1. Resio S. Moses (1991-1996)
  2. Asterio R. Takesy (1996-1997)
- Nauru -
  1. Lagumot Harris (1995-1996)
  2. Bernard Dowiyogo (1996)
  3. Kennan Adeang (1996)
  4. Rueben Kun (1996-1997)
- New Zealand - Don McKinnon (1990-1999)
  - Cook Islands - Inatio Akaruru (1989-1999)
- Palau - Andres Uherbelau (1994-1996)
- Papua New Guinea -
  1. Sir Julius Chan (1994-1996)
  2. Kilroy Genia (1996-1997)
- Solomon Islands -
  1. Danny Philip (1995-1996)
  2. David Sitai (1996-1997)
- Tonga - Prince Tupouto'a Tungi (1979-1998)
- Tuvalu -
  1. Kamuta Latasi (1993-1996)
  2. Bikenibeu Paeniu (1996-1999)
- Vanuatu -
  1. Alfred Maseng (1995-1996)
  2. Amos Bangabiti (1996)
  3. Willie Jimmy (1996-1997)
- Western Samoa - Tofilau Eti Alesana (1988-1998)

== Europe ==
- Albania -
  1. Alfred Serreqi (1992-1996)
  2. Tritan Shehu (1996-1997)
- Andorra - Manuel Mas Ribó (1994-1997)
- Austria - Wolfgang Schüssel (1995-2000)
- Belarus - Uladzimir Syanko (1994-1997)
- Belgium - Erik Derycke (1995-1999)
  - Brussels-Capital Region - Jos Chabert (1989-1999)
  - Flanders - Luc Van den Brande (1992-1999)
  - Wallonia -
    1. Jean-Pierre Grafé (1995-1996)
    2. William Ancion (1996-1999)
- Bosnia and Herzegovina -
  1. Muhamed Sacirbey (1995-1996)
  2. Jadranko Prlić (1996-2001)
  - Republika Srpska - Aleksa Buha (1992-1998)
- Bulgaria -
  1. Georgi Pirinski, Jr. (1995-1996)
  2. Irina Bokova (acting) (1996-1997)
- Croatia - Mate Granić (1993-2000)
- Cyprus - Alekos Michaelides (1993-1997)
  - Northern Cyprus -
    1. Atay Ahmet Raşit (1994-1996)
    2. Taner Etkin (1996-1998)
- Czech Republic - Josef Zieleniec (1992-1997)
- Denmark - Niels Helveg Petersen (1993-2000)
- Estonia -
  1. Siim Kallas (1995-1996)
  2. Toomas Hendrik Ilves (1996-1998)
- Finland - Tarja Halonen (1995-2000)
- France - Hervé de Charette (1995-1997)
- Germany - Klaus Kinkel (1992-1998)
- Greece -
  1. Karolos Papoulias (1993-1996)
  2. Theodoros Pangalos (1996-1999)
- Hungary - László Kovács (1994-1998)
- Iceland - Halldór Ásgrímsson (1995-2004)
- Ireland - Dick Spring (1994-1997)
- Italy -
  1. Susanna Agnelli (1995-1996)
  2. Lamberto Dini (1996-2001)
- Latvia - Valdis Birkavs (1994-1999)
- Liechtenstein - Andrea Willi (1993-2001)
- Lithuania -
  1. Povilas Gylys (1992-1996)
  2. Algirdas Saudargas (1996-2000)
- Luxembourg - Jacques Poos (1984-1999)
- Republic of Macedonia -
  1. Stevo Crvenkovski (1993-1996)
  2. Ljubomir Frckovski (1996-1997)
- Malta -
  1. Guido de Marco (1989-1996)
  2. George Vella (1996-1998)
- Moldova - Mihai Popov (1994-1997)
- Netherlands - Hans van Mierlo (1994-1998)
- Norway - Bjørn Tore Godal (1994-1997)
- Poland - Dariusz Rosati (1995-1997)
- Portugal - Jaime Gama (1995-2002)
- Romania -
  1. Teodor Meleşcanu (1992-1996)
  2. Adrian Severin (1996-1997)
- Russia -
  1. Andrey Kozyrev (1990-1996)
  2. Yevgeny Primakov (1996-1998)
  - Chechnya -
    1. Shamseddin Yusef (1992-1996)
    2. Ruslan Chimayev (1996-1997)
- San Marino - Gabriele Gatti (1986-2002)
- Slovakia -
  1. Juraj Schenk (1994-1996)
  2. Pavol Hamžík (1996-1997)
- Slovenia -
  1. Zoran Thaler (1995-1996)
  2. Davorin Kračun (1996-1997)
- Spain -
  1. Carlos Westendorp (1995-1996)
  2. Abel Matutes (1996-2000)
- Sweden - Lena Hjelm-Wallén (1994-1998)
- Switzerland - Flavio Cotti (1993-1999)
- Ukraine - Hennadiy Udovenko (1994-1998)
- United Kingdom - Malcolm Rifkind (1995-1997)
- Vatican City - Archbishop Jean-Louis Tauran (1990-2003)
- Yugoslavia - Milan Milutinović (1995-1998)
  - Montenegro - Janko Jeknić (1995-1997)

== North America and the Caribbean ==
- Antigua and Barbuda - Lester Bird (1991-2004)
- The Bahamas - Janet Bostwick (1994-2002)
- Barbados - Billie Miller (1994-2008)
- Belize - Dean Barrow (1993-1998)
- Canada -
  1. André Ouellet (1993-1996)
  2. Lloyd Axworthy (1996-2000)
  - Quebec -
    1. Bernard Landry (1994-1996)
    2. Sylvain Simard (1996-1998)
- Costa Rica - Fernando Naranjo Villalobos (1994-1998)
- Cuba - Roberto Robaina (1993-1999)
- Dominica - Edison James (1995-1998)
- Dominican Republic -
  1. Carlos Morales Troncoso (1994-1996)
  2. Eduardo Latorre Rodríguez (1996-2000)
- El Salvador - Ramón Ernesto González Giner (1995-1999)
- Grenada - Keith Mitchell (1995-1997)
- Guatemala -
  1. Alejandro Maldonado Aguirre (1995-1996)
  2. Eduardo Stein (1996-2000)
- Haiti - Fritz Longchamp (1995-2001)
- Honduras - Delmer Urbizo Panting (1995-1998)
- Jamaica - Seymour Mullings (1995-2000)
- Mexico - José Ángel Gurría (1994-1998)
- Nicaragua - Ernesto Leal (1992-1997)
- Panama -
  1. Gabriel Lewis Galindo (1994-1996)
  2. Ricardo Alberto Arias (1996-1998)
- Puerto Rico – Norma Burgos (1995–1999)
- Saint Kitts and Nevis - Denzil Douglas (1995-2000)
- Saint Lucia -
  1. George Mallet (1992-1996)
  2. Vaughan Lewis (1996-1997)
- Saint Vincent and the Grenadines - Alpian Allen (1994-1998)
- Trinidad and Tobago - Ralph Maraj (1995-2000)
- United States - Warren Christopher (1993-1997)

== South America ==
- Argentina - Guido di Tella (1991-1999)
- Bolivia - Antonio Araníbar Quiroga (1993-1997)
- Brazil - Luiz Felipe Palmeira Lampreia (1995-2001)
- Chile - José Miguel Insulza (1994-1999)
- Colombia -
  1. Rodrigo Pardo García-Peña (1994-1996)
  2. María Emma Mejía Vélez (1996-1998)
- Ecuador - Galo Leoro Franco (1994-1997)
- Guyana - Clement Rohee (1992-2001)
- Paraguay -
  1. Luis María Ramírez Boettner (1993-1996)
  2. Rubén Melgarejo Lanzoni (1996-1998)
- Peru - Francisco Tudela (1995-1997)
- Suriname -
  1. Subhas Mungra (1991-1996)
  2. Faried Pierkhan (1996-1997)
- Uruguay - Álvaro Ramos Trigo (1995-1998)
- Venezuela - Miguel Ángel Burelli Rivas (1994-1999)
