= Minister of Foreign Affairs and International Cooperation (Sierra Leone) =

The Minister of Foreign Affairs and International Cooperation of the Republic of Sierra Leone is a cabinet minister in charge of the Ministry of Foreign Affairs and International Cooperation of Sierra Leone, responsible for conducting foreign relations of the country.

The following is a list of foreign ministers of Sierra Leone since its founding in 1961:

No.	Name (Birth–Death)	Portrait	Tenure
1	John Karefa-Smart (1915–2010)		1961–1964
2	Cyril B. Rogers-Wright (1910–1971)		1964–1965
3	Maigore Kallon (1929–2015)		1965–1967
4	Leslie William Leigh (1921–1980)		1967–1968
5	Luseni A. M. Brewah (1925–?)		1968–1969
6	Cyril Foray (1934–2003)		1969–1971
7	Solomon Athanasius James Pratt (1921–2017)		1971–1973
8	Desmind Luke (b. 1935)		1973–1975
9	Francis Minah (1929–1989)		1975–1977
10	Abdulai Conteh (1945–2024)		1977–1984
11	Sheka Hassan Kanu (b. 1932)		1984–1985
12	Abdul Karim Koroma (b. 1944)		1985–1991
13	Ahmed Ramadan Dumbuya (b. 1942)		1991–1992
14	Mohamed Lamin Kamara (b. 1943)		1992–1993
15	Karefa Kargbo		1993–1994
16	Abass Bundu (b. 1948)		1994–1995
17	Alusine Fofanah (b. 1952)		1995–1996
18	Melvin Chalobah (b. 1944)		1996
(3)	Maigore Kallon (1929–2015)		1996
19	Shirley Gbujama (b. 1936)		1996–1997
20	Alimamy Pallo Bangura (b. 1950?)		1997–1998
21	Sama Banya (b. 1930)		1998–2001
(13)	Ahmed Ramadan Dumbuya (b. 1942)		2001–2002
22	Momodu Koroma (b. 1956)		2002–2007
23	Zainab Bangura (b. 1959)		2007–2010
24	J. B. Dauda (1942–2017)		2010–2012
25	Samura Kamara (b. 1963)		2012–2017
26	Kaifala Marah		2017–2018
27	Alie Kabba		2018–2019
28	Nabeela Tunis		2019–2021
29	David J. Francis (b. 1965)		2021–2023
30	Timothy Kabba		2023–present
