= Committee of Ministers of the Council of Europe =

Council of Europe's decision-making body

- Logo

Leadership
- President: Ervin Ibrahimović

Meeting place
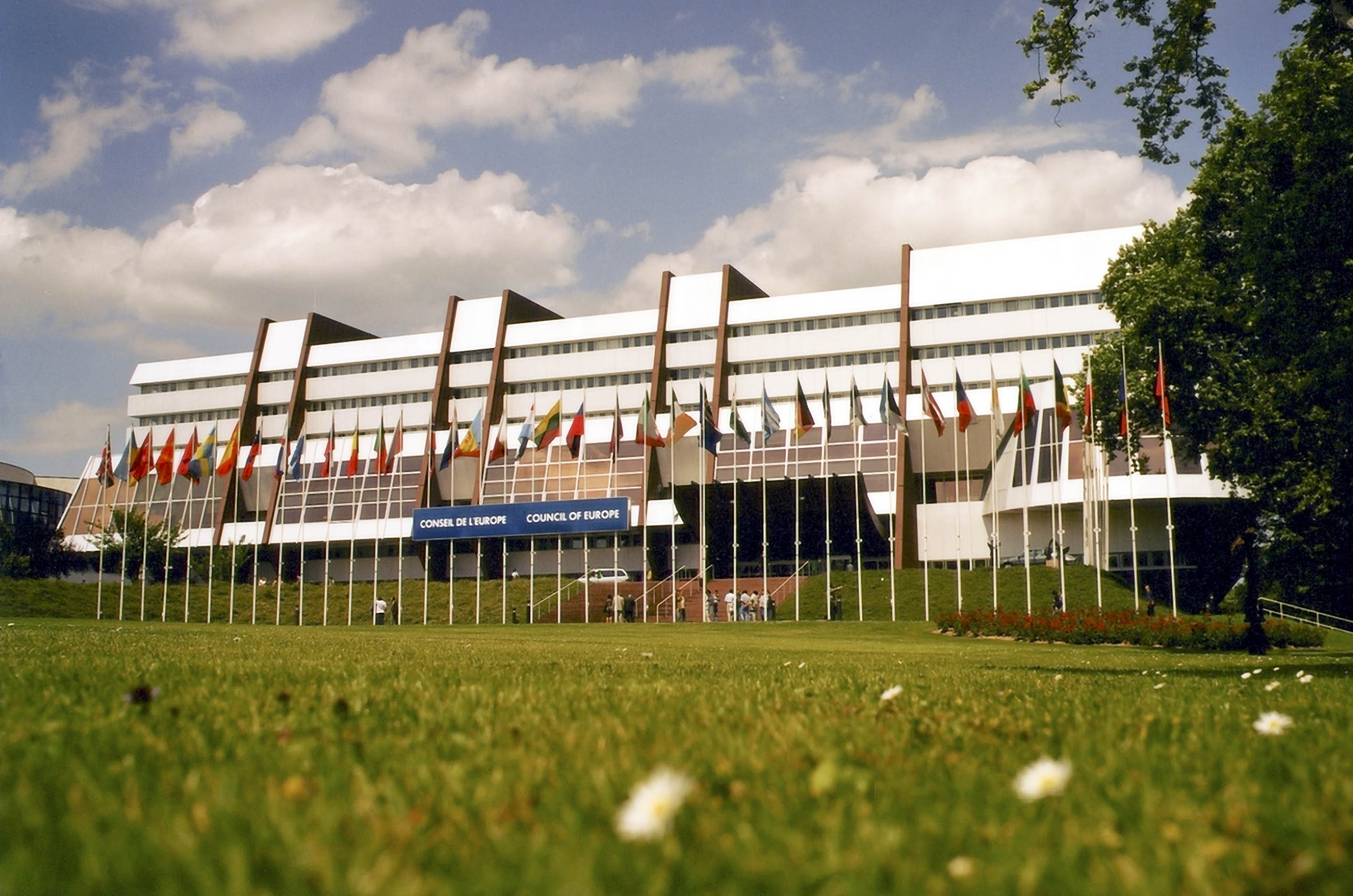
- Palace of Europe, Strasbourg, France

Website
- https://www.coe.int/en/web/cm

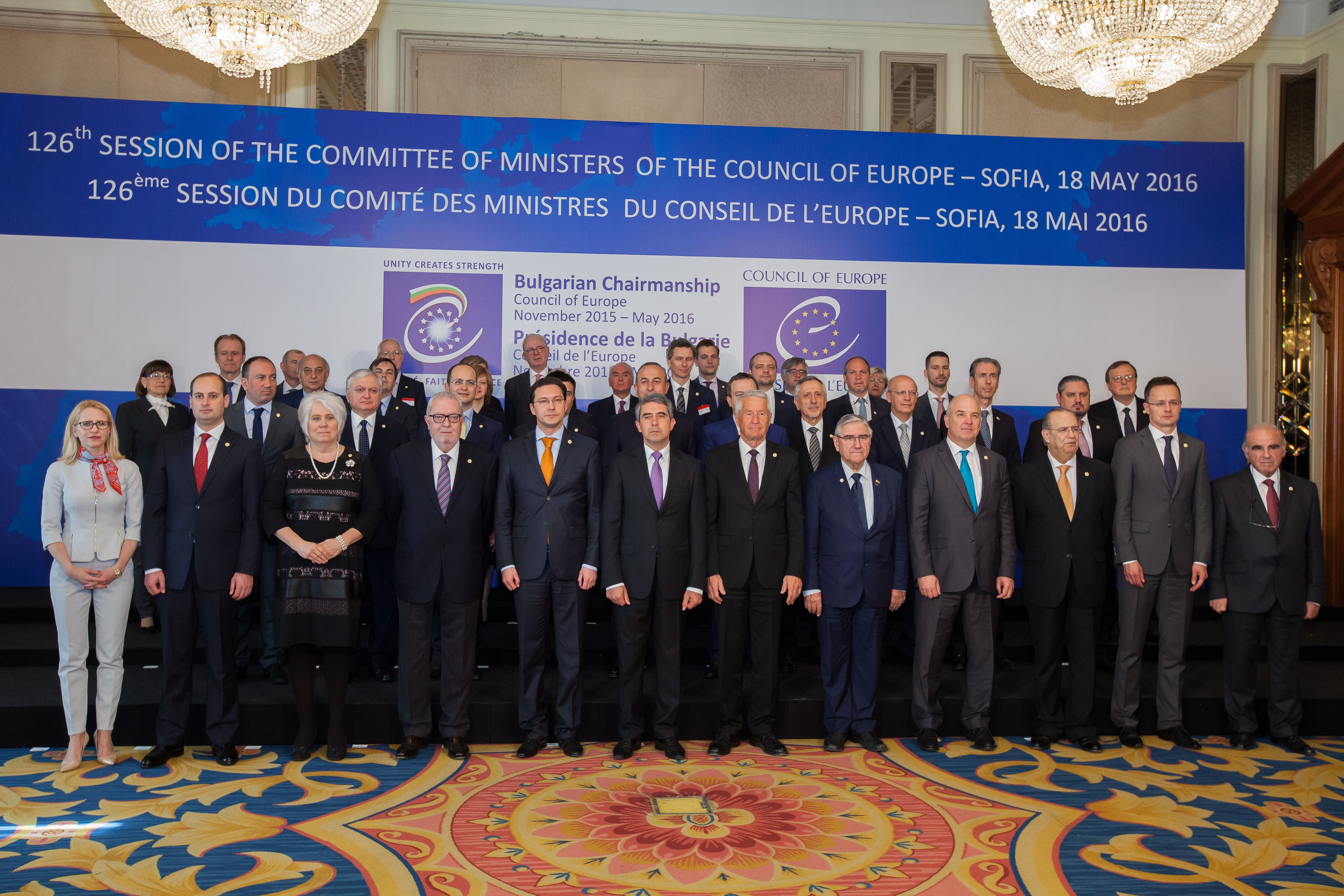
126th session of the Committee of Ministers of the Council of Europe in Sofia, 2016

The Committee of Ministers of the Council of Europe (French: Comité des ministres du Conseil de l'Europe) or Committee of Ministers (French: Comité des ministres) is the Council of Europe's decision-making body. It comprises the Foreign Affairs Ministers of all the member states, or their permanent diplomatic representatives in Strasbourg. It is both a governmental body, where national approaches to problems facing European society can be discussed on an equal footing, as well as a collective forum, where Europe-wide responses to such challenges are formulated. In collaboration with the Parliamentary Assembly, it is the guardian of the Council's fundamental values; it monitors member states' compliance with their undertakings. The Holy See, Japan, Mexico, and the US are observer states in the Committee of Ministers.

== Members of the Committee of Ministers ==
The Minister of Foreign Affairs of each Council of Europe member state sits on the Committee of Ministers. In May 1951 the Committee of Ministers invited each member state to appoint a Permanent Representative who would be in constant touch with the organisation. All Permanent Representatives reside in Strasbourg. They are usually senior diplomats with ambassadorial rank, occasionally chargés d'affaires.

In 1952 the Committee of Ministers decided that each Minister could appoint a Deputy. The Ministers' Deputies have the same decision-making powers as the Ministers. A Deputy is usually also the Permanent Representative of the member state.

The second in rank in a delegation usually has the title "Deputy Permanent Representative", not to be confused with "Ministers' Deputy".

Current Chair of the Committee is highlighted, with the position being currently held by Dominique Hasler from Liechtenstein from November 2023 until May 2024.

On 25 February 2022, following the Russian invasion of Ukraine, Russia's rights of representation were suspended, but it remained a member of the Council of Europe and party to the relevant Council of Europe conventions, including the European Convention on Human Rights.

Member	Minister	Member	Minister	Member	Minister
Republic of Albania; Shqipëria – Member since 13 July 1995	Ferit Hoxha	Principality of Andorra; Andorra – Member since 10 November 1994	Imma Tor Faus	Republic of Armenia; Հայաստան/Hayastan – Member since 25 January 2001	Ararat Mirzoyan
Republic of Austria; Österreich – Member since 16 April 1956	Beate Meinl-Reisinger	Republic of Azerbaijan; Azərbaycan – Member since 25 January 2001	Jeyhun Bayramov	Kingdom of Belgium; België/Belgique/Belgien (Note: Short names used within EU institutions.) – Member since 5 May 1949	Maxime Prévot
Bosnia and Herzegovina; Bosna i Hercegovina / Боснa и Херцеговина – Member since 24 April 2002	Elmedin Konaković	Republic of Bulgaria; България/Bǎlgariya – Member since 7 May 1992	Velislava Petrova-Chamova	Republic of Croatia; Hrvatska – Member since 6 November 1996	Gordan Grlić-Radman
Republic of Cyprus; Κύπρος/Kýpros/Kıbrıs – Member since 24 May 1961	Constantinos Kombos	Czech Republic; Česko – Member since 30 June 1993	Petr Macinka	Kingdom of Denmark; Danmark – Member since 5 May 1949	Lars Løkke Rasmussen
Republic of Estonia; Eesti – Member since 14 May 1993	Margus Tsahkna	Republic of Finland; Suomi/Finland – Member since 5 May 1989	Elina Valtonen	French Republic; France – Member since 5 May 1949	Jean-Noël Barrot
Georgia საქართველო/Sakartvelo – Member since 27 April 1999	Maka Bochorishvili	Federal Republic of Germany; Deutschland – Member since 13 July 1950	Johann Wadephul	Hellenic Republic; Ελλάδα/Elláda – Member since 9 August 1949	Giorgos Gerapetritis
Hungary; Magyarország – Member since 6 November 1990	Anita Orbán	Iceland; Ísland – Member since 7 March 1950	Þorgerður Katrín Gunnarsdóttir	Ireland; Éire/Ireland – Member since 5 May 1949	Helen McEntee
Italian Republic; Italia – Member since 5 May 1949	Antonio Tajani	Republic of Latvia; Latvija – Member since 10 February 1995	Baiba Braže	Principality of Liechtenstein; Liechtenstein – Member since 23 November 1978	Sabine Monauni
Republic of Lithuania; Lietuva – Member since 14 May 1993	Kęstutis Budrys	Grand Duchy of Luxembourg; Lëtzebuerg/Luxembourg/Luxemburg – Member since 5 May 1949	Xavier Bettel	Republic of Malta; Malta – Member since 29 April 1965	Chris Fearne
Republic of Moldova; Moldova – Member since 13 July 1995	Mihai Popșoi	Principality of Monaco; Monaco – Member since 5 October 2004	Isabelle Berro-Amadeï	Montenegro; Црна Гора/Crna Gora – Member since 11 May 2007	Ervin Ibrahimović
Kingdom of the Netherlands; Nederland – Member since 5 May 1949	Tom Berendsen	Republic of North Maecedonia; Северна Македонија/Severna Makedonija – Member since 9 November 1995	Timčo Mucunski	Kingdom of Norway; Norge/Noreg/Norga – Member since 5 May 1949	Espen Barth Eide
Republic of Poland; Polska – Member since 26 November 1991	Radosław Sikorski	Portuguese Republic; Portugal – Member since 22 September 1976	Paulo Rangel	Romania; România – Member since 7 October 1993	Oana Țoiu
Republic of San Marino; San Marino – Member since 16 November 1988	Luca Beccari	Republic of Serbia; Србија/Srbija – Member since 14 June 2006	Marko Đurić	Slovak Republic; Slovensko – Member since 30 June 1993	Juraj Blanár
Republic of Slovenia; Slovenija – Member since 14 May 1993	Tone Kajzer	Kingdom of Spain; España – Member since 24 November 1977	José Manuel Albares	Kingdom of Sweden; Sverige – Member since 5 May 1949	Maria Malmer Stenergard
Swiss Confederation; Schweiz/Suisse/Svizzera/Svizra – Member since 6 May 1963	Ignazio Cassis	Republic of Turkey; Türkiye – Member since 13 April 1950	Hakan Fidan	Ukraine; Україна/Ukrayina – Member since 9 November 1995	Andrii Sybiha
United Kingdom of Great Britain and Northern Ireland; United Kingdom – Member since 5 May 1949	Ed Miliband				

== Meetings of the Committee of Ministers ==
The Committee meets at ministerial level once a year, in May or in November. The meetings, known as "sessions", are normally held in Strasbourg and usually last one full day or two half days. While the greater part of each session is usually devoted to political dialogue, the Ministers may discuss all matters of mutual interest with the exception of national defence. Although the records of the sessions are confidential, a final communiqué is issued at the end of each meeting. The Ministers may also issue one or more declarations.

"Meetings of the Ministers' Deputies" are usually held in the Committee of Ministers' meeting room once a week. The Deputies also meet several times a week in subsidiary groups.

== The role of the Committee of Ministers ==
The Committee of Ministers performs a triple role; as the emanation of the governments which enables them to express on equal terms their national approaches to the problems confronting Europe's societies; as the collective forum where European responses to these challenges are worked out, alongside the Parliamentary Assembly of the Council of Europe and as guardian of the values for which the Council of Europe exists.

The work and activities of the Committee of Ministers include political dialogue, developing public international law through Council of Europe conventions, interacting with the Parliamentary Assembly of the Council of Europe, interacting with the Congress of Local and Regional Authorities of the Council of Europe.

=== Admitting new member States ===
The Committee of Ministers has the authority to invite European States to become members of the Council of Europe (Articles 4, 5 and 6 of the Statute). It may also suspend or terminate membership.

The process of admission begins when the Committee of Ministers, having received an official application for membership, consults the Parliamentary Assembly of the Council of Europe (under Statutory Resolution (51) 30). The Assembly adopts an opinion which is published in the Assembly's texts adopted.

If the Committee decides that a state can be admitted, it adopts a resolution inviting that state to become a member. The invitation specifies the number of seats that the state will have in the Assembly as well as its contribution to the budget. Recently the invitations have included a number of conditions concerning the implementation of democratic reforms in the applicant state.

Once invited, a state becomes a member by depositing, normally by the Minister for Foreign Affairs, an instrument of accession with the Secretary General of the Council of Europe.

The only European states which are not members of the Council of Europe and thus could in principle be admitted are Belarus, Kazakhstan and Vatican City as well as Kosovo pending clarification of its international legal status. Once the European Union has attained full legal personality, it could also accede to the Council of Europe. So far, the European Community has only signed Council of Europe treaties.

=== Concluding Conventions and agreements ===
Article 15.a of the Statute states that the Committee of Ministers of the Council of Europe "shall consider the action required to further the aim of the Council of Europe, including the conclusion of conventions and agreements".

Over 190 treaties have now been opened for signature. The European Convention of Human Rights of 1950 is the treaty with the strongest supervision mechanism by the European Court of Human Rights in Strasbourg and the Committee of Ministers.

The text of any treaty is finalised when it is adopted by the Committee. Under Article 20 of the Statute adoption of a treaty requires:

- a two-thirds majority of the representatives casting a vote;
- a majority of those entitled to vote.

The same majorities are required to authorise the publication of any explanatory report. The Committee also fixes the date that the treaty will be opened for signature. Conventions are legally binding for those States which ratify them.

=== Adopting recommendations to member states ===
Article 15.b of the Statute provides for the Committee of Ministers to make recommendations to member states on matters for which the Committee has agreed "a common policy".

Under Article 20 of the Statute, adoption of a recommendation requires a unanimous vote of all representatives present and a majority of those entitled to vote.

However, at their 519 bis meeting (November 1994) the Ministers' Deputies decided to make their voting procedure more flexible and made a "Gentleman's agreement" not to apply the unanimity rule to recommendations. Recommendations are not binding on member States.

Since 1993 the Committee has also adopted recommendations in accordance with its role in the implementation of the European Social Charter (Article 29 of the Social Charter). Recommendations adopted before 1979 were issued in the "Resolutions" series of texts adopted.

The Statute permits the Committee of Ministers to ask member governments "to inform it of the action taken by them" in regard to recommendations (Article 15.b). In 1987, at their 405th meeting, the Ministers' Deputies adopted a message to the intergovernmental committees (steering committees and committees of experts), urging them to improve their monitoring of the implementation of recommendations and resolutions.

=== Adopting the budget ===
Under Article 38.c of the Statute the Secretary General is required to prepare a draft budget each year and submit it to the Committee of Ministers for adoption. The draft budget is presented to the Deputies in November of each year. It is adopted, along with the Programme of Activities, in the form of resolutions. Under Article 29 of the Financial Regulations (revised in May 1997) the Deputies are assisted by a Budget Committee composed of eleven independent experts, appointed by the Committee of Ministers acting on proposals from member governments. An abridged version of the adopted budget is available in electronic form.

=== Communication ===
In 2006 the Committee of Ministers launched the "Council of Europe Communication Strategy", the first time that the Council of Europe had had a proper communication policy.

==== Adopting and monitoring the Programme of Activities ====
Since 1966 the Council of Europe has organised, planned and budgeted its activities according to an annual work programme, published as the "Intergovernmental Programme of Activities". The Deputies adopt the programme towards the end of each year and are entrusted with overseeing its implementation. Article 17 of the Statute authorises the Committee of Ministers to set up "advisory or technical committees". This has led to the creation of some 30 steering committees and a large number of ad hoc expert committees, which assist the Committee of Ministers in the implementation of the programme of activities.

==== Supervising the execution of judgments of the European Court of Human Rights ====
In accordance with Article 46 of the Convention as amended by Protocol No. 11, the Committee of Ministers supervises the execution of judgments of the European Court of Human Rights. This work is carried out mainly at four regular meetings (DH/HR meetings) every year. Documentation for these meetings takes the form of the Annotated Agenda and Order of Business. These documents are made public, as are, in general, the decisions taken in each case. The Committee of Ministers' essential function is to ensure that member states comply with the judgments of the European Court of Human Rights. The Committee completes each case by adopting a final resolution. In some cases, interim resolutions may prove appropriate. Both kinds of Resolutions are public.

== Chairmanship ==
Incumbent listed in bold.

- Switzerland : November 1991 – May 1992 (René Felber)
- Turkey : May – November 1992 (Hikmet Çetin)
- United Kingdom : November 1992 – May 1993 (Douglas Hurd)
- Austria : May – November 1993 (Alois Mock)
- Belgium : November 1993 – May 1994 (Willy Claes)
- Bulgaria : May – November 1994 (Stanislav Daskalov, Ivan Stanchov)
- Cyprus : November 1994 – May 1995 (Alekos Michaelides)
- Czechia : May – November 1995 (Josef Zieleniec)
- Denmark : November 1995 – May 1996 (Niels Helveg Petersen)
- Estonia : May – November 1996 (Siim Kallas)
- Finland : November 1996 – May 1997 (Tarja Halonen)
- France : May – November 1997 (Hervé de Charette, Hubert Védrine)
- Germany : November 1997 – May 1998 (Klaus Kinkel)
- Greece : May – November 1998 (Theodoros Pangalos)
- Hungary : November 1998 – May 1999 (János Martonyi)
- Iceland : May – November 1999 (Halldór Ásgrímsson)
- Ireland : November 1999 – May 2000 (David Andrews, Brian Cowen)
- Italy : May – November 2000 (Lamberto Dini)
- Latvia : November 2000 – May 2001 (Indulis Bērziņš)
- Liechtenstein : May – November 2001 (Ernst Walch)
- Lithuania : November 2001 – May 2002 (Antanas Valionis)
- Luxembourg : May – November 2002 (Lydie Polfer)
- Malta : November 2002 – May 2003 (Joe Borg)
- Moldova : May – November 2003 (Nicolae Dudău)
- Netherlands : November 2003 – May 2004 (Jaap de Hoop Scheffer, Ben Bot)
- Norway : May – November 2004 (Jan Petersen)
- Poland : November 2004 – May 2005 (Włodzimierz Cimoszewicz, Adam Daniel Rotfeld)
- Portugal : May – November 2005 (Diogo Freitas do Amaral)
- Romania : November 2005 – May 2006 (Mihai Răzvan Ungureanu)
- Russia : May – November 2006 (Sergey Lavrov)
- San Marino : November 2006 – May 2007 (Fiorenzo Stolfi)
- Serbia : May – November 2007 (Vuk Jeremić)
- Slovakia : November 2007 – May 2008 (Ján Kubiš)
- Sweden : May – November 2008 (Carl Bildt)
- Spain : November 2008 – May 2009 (Miguel Ángel Moratinos)
- Slovenia : May – November 2009 (Samuel Žbogar)
- Switzerland : November 2009 – May 2010 (Micheline Calmy-Rey)
- Republic of Macedonia : May – November 2010 (Antonio Milošoski)
- Turkey : November 2010 – May 2011 (Ahmet Davutoğlu)
- Ukraine : May – November 2011 (Kostyantyn Gryshchenko)
- United Kingdom : November 2011 – May 2012 (William Hague)
- Albania : May – November 2012 (Edmond Haxhinasto, Edmond Panariti)
- Andorra : November 2012 – May 2013 (Gilbert Saboya Sunyé)
- Armenia : May – November 2013 (Eduard Nalbandyan)
- Austria : November 2013 – May 2014 (Michael Spindelegger, Sebastian Kurz)
- Azerbaijan : May – November 2014 (Elmar Mammadyarov)
- Belgium : November 2014 – May 2015 (Didier Reynders)
- Bosnia and Herzegovina : May – November 2015 (Igor Crnadak)
- Bulgaria : November 2015 – May 2016 (Daniel Mitov)
- Estonia : May – November 2016 (Marina Kaljurand, Jürgen Ligi)
- Cyprus : November 2016 – May 2017 (Ioannis Kasoulidis)
- Czechia : May – November 2017 (Lubomír Zaorálek)
- Denmark : November 2017 – May 2018 (Anders Samuelsen)
- Croatia : May – November 2018 (Marija Pejčinović Burić)
- Finland : November 2018 – May 2019 (Timo Soini)
- France : May – November 2019 (Jean-Yves Le Drian)
- Georgia : November 2019 – May 2020 (David Zalkaliani)
- Greece : May – November 2020 (Nikos Dendias)
- Germany : November 2020 – May 2021 (Heiko Maas)
- Hungary : May – November 2021 (Péter Szijjártó)
- Italy : November 2021 – May 2022 (Luigi Di Maio)
- Ireland : May – November 2022 (Simon Coveney)
- Iceland : November 2022 – May 2023 (Þórdís Kolbrún R. Gylfadóttir)
- Latvia : May – November 2023 (Edgars Rinkēvičs, Arturs Krišjānis Kariņš)
- Liechtenstein : November 2023 – May 2024 (Dominique Hasler)
- Lithuania : May – November 2024 (Gabrielius Landsbergis)
- Luxembourg : November 2024 – May 2025 (Xavier Bettel)
- Malta : May – November 2025 (Ian Borg)
- Moldova : November 2025 – May 2026 (Mihai Popșoi)
- Monaco : May – November 2026 (Isabelle Berro-Amadeï)
- **Montenegro : November 2026 – May 2027** (Ervin Ibrahimović)
- Netherlands : May – November 2027
- North Macedonia : November 2027 – May 2028
- Norway : May – November 2028
- Poland : November 2028 – May 2029
- Portugal : May – November 2029
