= Ganev =

Ganev (masculine, Bulgarian: Ганев) or Ganeva (feminine, Bulgarian: Ганева) is a Bulgarian surname. Notable people with the surname include:

- Dimitar Ganev (1898–1964), Bulgarian communist politician
- Guinio Ganev (1928–2016), Bulgarian politician, MP and national ombudsman
- Lyubomir Ganev (born 1965), Bulgarian volleyball player
- Mihail Ganev (born 1985), Bulgarian sport wrestler
- Nikolay Ganev (born 1955), Bulgarian former swimmer
- Petko Ganev (born 1996), Bulgarian professional footballer
- Stoyan Ganev (1955–2013), Bulgarian diplomat, politician and jurist
- Valentin Ganev (born 1956), Bulgarian theatre and film actor and theatre director
- Venelin Ganev (1880–1966), Bulgarian lawyer, diplomat and politician
- Veselin Ganev (born 1987), Bulgarian footballer
- Hennadiy Hanyev (born 1990), Ukrainian footballer of Bulgarian descent
