= List of foreign ministers in 1993 =

This is a list of foreign ministers in 1993.

== Africa ==
| Flag | Country | Foreign minister | Term |
|---|---|---|---|
| (Algeria) | Algeria | Lakhdar Brahimi; Redha Malek; Mohamed Salah Dembri | 1991-1993; 1993; 1993-1996 |
| (Angola) | Angola | Venâncio da Silva Moura | 1992-1999 |
| (Benin) | Benin | Saturnin Soglo; Robert Dossou | 1992-1993; 1993-1995 |
| (Botswana) | Botswana | Gaositwe K.T. Chiepe | 1985-1994 |
| (Burkina Faso) | Burkina Faso | Thomas Sanou | 1992-1994 |
| (Burundi) | Burundi | Libère Bararunyeretse; Sylvestre Ntibantunganya; Jean-Marie Ngendahayo | 1992-1993; 1993; 1993-1995 |
| (Cameroon) | Cameroon | Ferdinand Oyono | 1992-1997 |
| (Cape Verde) | Cape Verde | Jorge Carlos Fonseca; Manuel Casimiro de Jesus Chantre | 1991-1993; 1993-1995 |
| (Central African Republic) | Central African Republic | Jean-Marie Bassia; Simon Bedaya-Ngaro | 1992-1993; 1993-1996 |
| (Chad) | Chad | Mahamat Ali Adoum; Korom Ahmad | 1992-1993; 1993-1994 |
| (Comoros) | Comoros | Said Hassane Said Hachim; Athoumane Said Ahmed; Mouslim Ben Moussa | 1991-1993; 1993; 1993-1994 |
| (Republic of the Congo) | Congo | Benjamin Bounkoulou | 1992-1995 |
| (Djibouti) | Djibouti | Moumin Bahdon Farah; Mohamed Bolock Abdou | 1978-1993; 1993-1995 |
| (Egypt) | Egypt | Amr Moussa | 1991-2001 |
| (Equatorial Guinea) | Equatorial Guinea | Benjamín Mba Ekua Mikó; Miguel Oyono Ndong Mifumu | 1992-1993; 1993-1999 |
| | Eritrea | Mahmoud Ahmed Sherifo | 1993-1994 |
| (Ethiopia) | Ethiopia | Seyoum Mesfin | 1991-2010 |
| (Gabon) | Gabon | Pascaline Mferri Bongo | 1991-1994 |
| (The Gambia) | The Gambia | Omar Sey | 1987-1994 |
| (Ghana) | Ghana | Obed Asamoah | 1981-1997 |
| (Guinea) | Guinea | Jean Traoré; Ibrahima Sylla | 1985-1993; 1993-1994 |
| (Guinea-Bissau) | Guinea-Bissau | Bernardino Cardoso | 1992-1995 |
| (Ivory Coast) | Ivory Coast | Amara Essy | 1990-2000 |
| (Kenya) | Kenya | Wilson Ndolo Ayah; Kalonzo Musyoka | 1990-1993; 1993-1998 |
| (Lesotho) | Lesotho | Pius Tanki Molapo; Molapo Qhobela | 1991-1993; 1993-1994 |
| (Liberia) | Liberia | Gabriel Bacchus Matthews; Momolu Sirleaf | 1990-1993; 1993-1994 |
| (Libya) | Libya | Umar Mustafa al-Muntasir | 1992-2000 |
| (Madagascar) | Madagascar | Césaire Rabenoro; Jacques Sylla | 1991-1993; 1993-1996 |
| (Malawi) | Malawi | Hastings Banda; Hetherwick Ntaba | 1964-1993; 1993-1994 |
| (Mali) | Mali | Mohamed Aloussine Touré; Ibrahim Boubacar Keïta | 1992-1993; 1993-1994 |
| (Mauritania) | Mauritania | Mohamed Abderahmane Ould Moine | 1992-1994 |
| (Mauritius) | Mauritius | Paul Bérenger; Swalay Kasenally | 1991-1993; 1993-1994 |
| (Morocco) | Morocco | Abdellatif Filali | 1985-1999 |
| (Mozambique) | Mozambique | Pascoal Mocumbi | 1987-1994 |
| (Namibia) | Namibia | Theo-Ben Gurirab | 1990-2002 |
| (Niger) | Niger | Hassan Hamidou; Abdourahmane Hama | 1991-1993; 1993-1995 |
| (Nigeria) | Nigeria | Ike Nwachukwu; Matthew Mbu; Baba Gana Kingibe | 1990-1993; 1993; 1993-1995 |
| (Rwanda) | Rwanda | Boniface Ngulinzira; Anastase Gasana | 1992-1993; 1993-1994 |
| (São Tomé and Príncipe) | São Tomé and Príncipe | Alda Bandeira; Albertino Bragança | 1991-1993; 1993-1994 |
| (Senegal) | Senegal | Djibo Leyti Kâ; Moustapha Niasse | 1991-1993; 1993-1998 |
| (Seychelles) | Seychelles | Danielle de St. Jorre | 1989-1997 |
| (Sierra Leone) | Sierra Leone | Mohamed Lamin Kamara; Karefa Kargbo | 1992-1993; 1993-1994 |
| (Somalia) (Somaliland) | Somalia Somaliland | no central government Yusuf Ali Guray Sheikh Madar | 1991-1993 |
| (South Africa) | South Africa | Pik Botha | 1977-1994 |
| (Sudan) | Sudan | Ali Sahloul; Hussein Suleiman Abu Saleh | 1989-1993; 1993-1995 |
| (Eswatini) | Swaziland | Sir George Mbikwakhe Mamba; Solomon Dlamini | 1987-1993; 1993-1995 |
| (Tanzania) | Tanzania | Ahmed Hassan Diria; Joseph Rwegasira | 1990-1993; 1993-1995 |
| (Togo) | Togo | Fambaré Ouattara Natchaba | 1992-1994 |
| (Tunisia) | Tunisia | Habib Ben Yahia | 1991-1997 |
| (Uganda) | Uganda | Paul Ssemogerere | 1988-1994 |
| (Sahrawi Arab Democratic Republic) | Western Sahara | Mohamed Salem Ould Salek | 1988-1995 |
| (Zaire) | Zaire | Pierre Lumbi; Mpinga Kasenda | 1992-1993; 1993-1994 |
| (Zambia) | Zambia | Vernon Mwaanga | 1991-1994 |
| (Zimbabwe) | Zimbabwe | Nathan Shamuyarira | 1987-1995 |

== Asia ==
| Flag | Country | Foreign minister | Term |
|---|---|---|---|
| (Afghanistan) | Afghanistan | Sayed Solaiman Gilani; Hedayat Amin Arsala | 1992-1993; 1993-1994 |
| (Armenia) | Armenia | Arman Kirakossian; Vahan Papasyan | 1992-1993; 1993-1996 |
| (Azerbaijan) (Republic of Artsakh) | Azerbaijan Nagorno-Karabakh | Tofig Gasimov; Albert Salsamov; Hasan Hasanov Arkadi Ghukasyan | 1992-1993; 1993; 1993-1998 1993-1997 |
| (Bahrain) | Bahrain | Sheikh Muhammad ibn Mubarak ibn Hamad Al Khalifah | 1971-2005 |
| (Bangladesh) | Bangladesh | A.S.M. Mostafizur Rahman | 1991-1996 |
| (Bhutan) | Bhutan | Dawa Tsering | 1972-1998 |
| (Brunei) | Brunei | Pengiran Muda Mohamed Bolkiah | 1984–2015 |
| (Cambodia) | Cambodia | Hor Namhong; Prince Norodom Sirivudh | 1990-1993; 1993-1994 |
| (China) | China (People's Republic) | Qian Qichen | 1988-1998 |
| (Georgia (country)) (Abkhazia) | Georgia Abkhazia | Aleksandre Chikvaidze Said Tarkil; Sokrat Jinjolia | 1992-1995 1993; 1993-1994 |
| (India) | India | P. V. Narasimha Rao; Dinesh Singh | 1992-1993; 1993-1995 |
| (Indonesia) | Indonesia | Ali Alatas | 1988-1999 |
| (Iran) | Iran | Ali Akbar Velayati | 1981-1997 |
| (Iraq) | Iraq | Muhammad Saeed al-Sahhaf | 1992-2001 |
| (Israel) | Israel | Shimon Peres | 1992-1995 |
| (Japan) | Japan | Michio Watanabe; Kabun Mutō; Tsutomu Hata | 1991-1993; 1993; 1993-1994 |
| (Jordan) | Jordan | Kamel Abu Jaber | 1991-1994 |
| (Kazakhstan) | Kazakhstan | Tuleutai Suleimenov | 1991-1994 |
| (North Korea) | North Korea | Kim Yong-nam | 1983-1998 |
| (South Korea) | South Korea | Yi Sang-ok; Han Seung-ju | 1990-1993; 1993-1994 |
| (Kuwait) | Kuwait | Sheikh Sabah Al-Ahmad Al-Jaber Al-Sabah | 1978-2003 |
| (Kyrgyzstan) | Kyrgyzstan | Ednan Karabayev; Myrza Kaparov | 1992-1993; 1993-1994 |
| (Laos) | Laos | Phoune Sipraseuth; Somsavat Lengsavad | 1975-1993; 1993-2006 |
| (Lebanon) | Lebanon | Farès Boueiz | 1992-1998 |
| (Malaysia) | Malaysia | Abdullah Ahmad Badawi | 1991-1999 |
| (Maldives) | Maldives | Fathulla Jameel | 1978-2005 |
| (Mongolia) | Mongolia | Tserenpiliyn Gombosüren | 1988-1996 |
| (Myanmar) | Myanmar (Burma) | Ohn Gyaw | 1991-1998 |
| (Nepal) | Nepal | Girija Prasad Koirala | 1991-1994 |
| (Oman) | Oman | Yusuf bin Alawi bin Abdullah | 1982–2020 |
| (Pakistan) | Pakistan | Siddiq Khan Kanju; Abdul Sattar; Farooq Leghari; Aseff Ahmad Ali | 1991-1993; 1993; 1993; 1993-1996 |
| (Philippines) | Philippines | Roberto Romulo | 1992-1995 |
| (Qatar) | Qatar | Sheikh Hamad bin Jassim bin Jaber Al Thani | 1992-2013 |
| (Saudi Arabia) | Saudi Arabia | Prince Saud bin Faisal bin Abdulaziz Al Saud | 1975–2015 |
| (Singapore) | Singapore | Wong Kan Seng | 1988-1994 |
| (Sri Lanka) | Sri Lanka | Harold Herath; Abdul Cader Shahul Hameed | 1990-1993; 1993-1994 |
| (Syria) | Syria | Farouk al-Sharaa | 1984-2006 |
| (Taiwan) | Taiwan (Republic of China) | Fredrick Chien | 1990-1996 |
| (Tajikistan) | Tajikistan | Rashid Alimov | 1992-1994 |
| (Thailand) | Thailand | Prasong Soonsiri | 1992-1994 |
| (Turkey) | Turkey | Hikmet Çetin | 1991-1994 |
| (Turkmenistan) | Turkmenistan | Halykberdi Ataýew | 1992-1993 |
| (United Arab Emirates) | United Arab Emirates | Rashid Abdullah Al Nuaimi | 1980-2006 |
| (Uzbekistan) | Uzbekistan | Ubaidulla Abdurazzakov; Sodiq Safoyev; Saidmukhtar Saidkasimov | 1992-1993; 1993; 1993-1994 |
| (Vietnam) | Vietnam | Nguyễn Mạnh Cầm | 1991-2000 |
| (Yemen) | Yemen | Abd Al-Karim Al-Iryani; Mohammed Basindawa | 1990-1993; 1993-1994 |

== Australia and Oceania ==
| Flag | Country | Foreign minister | Term |
|---|---|---|---|
| (Australia) | Australia | Gareth Evans | 1988-1996 |
| (Fiji) | Fiji | Filipe Bole | 1992-1994 |
| (Kiribati) | Kiribati | Teatao Teannaki | 1991-1994 |
| (Marshall Islands) | Marshall Islands | Tom Kijiner | 1988-1994 |
| (Federated States of Micronesia) | Micronesia | Resio S. Moses | 1991-1996 |
| (Nauru) | Nauru | Bernard Dowiyogo | 1989-1995 |
| (New Zealand) (Cook Islands) | New Zealand Cook Islands | Don McKinnon Inatio Akaruru | 1990-1999 1989-1999 |
| (Papua New Guinea) | Papua New Guinea | John Kaputin | 1992-1994 |
| (Solomon Islands) | Solomon Islands | Sir Peter Kenilorea; Job Tausinga | 1990-1993; 1993-1994 |
| (Tonga) | Tonga | Prince Tupouto'a Tungi | 1979-1998 |
| (Tuvalu) | Tuvalu | Bikenibeu Paeniu; Kamuta Latasi | 1989-1993; 1993-1996 |
| (Vanuatu) | Vanuatu | Serge Vohor; Maxime Carlot Korman | 1991-1993; 1993-1995 |
| (Samoa) | Western Samoa | Tofilau Eti Alesana | 1988-1998 |

== Europe ==
| Flag | Country | Foreign minister | Term |
|---|---|---|---|
| (Albania) | Albania | Alfred Serreqi | 1992-1996 |
| (Andorra) | Andorra | Antoni Armengol | 1993-1994 |
| (Austria) | Austria | Alois Mock | 1987-1995 |
| (Belarus) | Belarus | Petr Krauchenka | 1990-1994 |
| (Belgium) (Brussels) (Flanders) (Wallonia) | Belgium Brussels-Capital Region Flanders Wallonia | Willy Claes Jos Chabert Luc Van den Brande Guy Spitaels | 1992-1994 1989-1999 1992-1999 1992-1994 |
| (Bosnia and Herzegovina) (Republika Srpska) | Bosnia and Herzegovina Republika Srpska | Haris Silajdžić; Irfan Ljubijankić Aleksa Buha | 1990-1993; 1993-1995 1992-1998 |
| (Bulgaria) | Bulgaria | Stoyan Ganev; Slavi Pashovski; Stanislav Daskalov | 1991-1993; 1993; 1993-1995 |
| (Croatia) | Croatia | Zdenko Škrabalo; Mate Granić | 1992-1993; 1993-2000 |
| (Cyprus) (Northern Cyprus) | Cyprus Northern Cyprus | Georgios Iacovou; Alekos Michaelides Kenan Atakol | 1983-1993; 1993-1997 1985-1993 |
| (Czech Republic) | Czech Republic | Josef Zieleniec | 1992-1997 |
| (Denmark) | Denmark | Uffe Ellemann-Jensen; Niels Helveg Petersen | 1982-1993; 1993-2000 |
| (Estonia) | Estonia | Trivimi Velliste | 1992-1994 |
| (Finland) | Finland | Paavo Väyrynen; Heikki Haavisto | 1991-1993; 1993-1995 |
| (France) | France | Roland Dumas; Alain Juppé | 1988-1993; 1993-1995 |
| (Germany) | Germany | Klaus Kinkel | 1992-1998 |
| (Greece) | Greece | Michalis Papakonstantinou; Karolos Papoulias | 1992-1993; 1993-1996 |
| (Hungary) | Hungary | Géza Jeszenszky | 1990-1994 |
| (Iceland) | Iceland | Jón Baldvin Hannibalsson | 1988-1995 |
| (Republic of Ireland) | Ireland | David Andrews; Dick Spring | 1992-1993; 1993-1994 |
| (Italy) | Italy | Emilio Colombo; Beniamino Andreatta | 1992-1993; 1993-1994 |
| (Latvia) | Latvia | Georgs Andrejevs | 1992-1994 |
| (Liechtenstein) | Liechtenstein | Hans Brunhart; Markus Büchel; Andrea Willi | 1978-1993; 1993; 1993-2001 |
| (Lithuania) | Lithuania | Povilas Gylys | 1992-1996 |
| (Luxembourg) | Luxembourg | Jacques Poos | 1984-1999 |
| (North Macedonia) | Republic of Macedonia | Denko Maleski; Stevo Crvenkovski | 1991-1993; 1993-1996 |
| (Malta) | Malta | Guido de Marco | 1989-1996 |
| (Moldova) | Moldova | Nicolae Țâu; Ion Botnaru | 1991-1993; 1993-1994 |
| (Netherlands) | Netherlands | Hans van den Broek; Pieter Kooijmans | 1982-1993; 1993-1994 |
| (Norway) | Norway | Thorvald Stoltenberg; Johan Jørgen Holst | 1990-1993; 1993-1994 |
| (Poland) | Poland | Krzysztof Skubiszewski; Andrzej Olechowski | 1989-1993; 1993-1995 |
| (Portugal) | Portugal | José Manuel Barroso | 1992-1995 |
| (Romania) | Romania | Teodor Meleşcanu | 1992-1996 |
| (Russia) (Chechen Republic of Ichkeria) | Russia Chechnya | Andrey Kozyrev Shamseddin Yusef | 1990-1996 1992-1996 |
| (San Marino) | San Marino | Gabriele Gatti | 1986-2002 |
| (Slovakia) | Slovakia | Milan Kňažko; Jozef Moravčík | 1992-1993; 1993-1994 |
| (Slovenia) | Slovenia | Dimitrij Rupel; Lojze Peterle | 1990-1993; 1993-1994 |
| (Spain) | Spain | Javier Solana | 1992-1995 |
| (Sweden) | Sweden | Margaretha af Ugglas | 1991-1994 |
| (Switzerland) | Switzerland | René Felber; Flavio Cotti | 1988-1993; 1993-1999 |
| (Ukraine) | Ukraine | Anatoliy Zlenko | 1990-1994 |
| (United Kingdom) | United Kingdom | Douglas Hurd | 1989-1995 |
| (Vatican City) | Vatican City | Archbishop Jean-Louis Tauran | 1990-2003 |
| (Federal Republic of Yugoslavia) (Montenegro) (Serbia) | Yugoslavia Montenegro Serbia | Ilija Đukić; Vladislav Jovanović Miodrag Lekić Vladislav Jovanović | 1992-1993; 1993-1995 1992-1995 1991-1993 |

== North America and the Caribbean ==
| Flag | Country | Foreign minister | Term |
|---|---|---|---|
| (Antigua and Barbuda) | Antigua and Barbuda | Lester Bird | 1991-2004 |
| (The Bahamas) | The Bahamas | Orville Turnquest | 1992-1994 |
| (Barbados) | Barbados | Maurice King; Branford Taitt | 1989-1993; 1993-1994 |
| (Belize) | Belize | Said Musa; Dean Barrow | 1989-1993; 1993-1998 |
| (Canada) (Quebec) | Canada Quebec | Barbara McDougall; Perrin Beatty; André Ouellet John Ciaccia | 1991-1993; 1993; 1993-1996 1989-1994 |
| (Costa Rica) | Costa Rica | Bernd H. Niehaus Quesada | 1990-1994 |
| (Cuba) | Cuba | Ricardo Alarcón; Roberto Robaina | 1992-1993; 1993-1999 |
| (Dominica) | Dominica | Brian George Keith Alleyne | 1990-1995 |
| (Dominican Republic) | Dominican Republic | Juan Aristides Taveras Guzmán | 1991-1994 |
| (El Salvador) | El Salvador | José Manuel Pacas Castro | 1989-1994 |
| (Grenada) | Grenada | Nicholas Brathwaite | 1992-1995 |
| (Guatemala) | Guatemala | Gonzalo Menéndez Park; Arturo Fajardo Maldonado | 1991-1993; 1993-1994 |
| (Haiti) | Haiti | François Benoît; Claudette Werleigh | 1992-1993; 1993-1995 |
| (Honduras) | Honduras | Mario Carías Zapata | 1990-1994 |
| (Jamaica) | Jamaica | David Coore; Paul Robertson | 1989-1993; 1993-1995 |
| (Mexico) | Mexico | Fernando Solana; Manuel Camacho Solís | 1988-1993; 1993-1994 |
| (Nicaragua) | Nicaragua | Ernesto Leal | 1992-1997 |
| (Panama) | Panama | Julio Linares; José Raúl Mulino | 1989-1993; 1993-1994 |
| (Puerto Rico) | Puerto Rico | Salvador M. Padilla Escabi; Baltasar Corrada del Río | 1992–1993; 1993–1995 |
| (Saint Kitts and Nevis) | Saint Kitts and Nevis | Kennedy Simmonds | 1983-1995 |
| (Saint Lucia) | Saint Lucia | George Mallet | 1992-1996 |
| (Saint Vincent and the Grenadines) | Saint Vincent and the Grenadines | Herbert Young | 1992-1994 |
| (Trinidad and Tobago) | Trinidad and Tobago | Ralph Maraj | 1991-1995 |
| (United States) | United States | Lawrence Eagleburger; Arnold Kanter (acting); Frank G. Wisner (acting); Warren Christopher | 1992-1993; 1993; 1993; 1993-1997 |

== South America ==
| Flag | Country | Foreign minister | Term |
|---|---|---|---|
| (Argentina) | Argentina | Guido di Tella | 1991-1999 |
| (Bolivia) | Bolivia | Ronald MacLean Abaroa; Roberto Peña Rodríguez; Antonio Araníbar Quiroga | 1992-1993; 1993; 1993-1997 |
| (Brazil) | Brazil | Fernando Henrique Cardoso; Luiz Felipe Palmeira Lampreia (acting); Celso Amorim | 1992-1993; 1993; 1993-1995 |
| (Chile) | Chile | Enrique Silva Cimma | 1990-1994 |
| (Colombia) | Colombia | Noemí Sanín | 1991-1994 |
| (Ecuador) | Ecuador | Diego Paredes Peña | 1992-1994 |
| (Guyana) | Guyana | Clement Rohee | 1992-2001 |
| (Paraguay) | Paraguay | Alexis Frutos Vaesken; Diogenes Martínez; Luis María Ramírez Boettner | 1990-1993; 1993; 1993-1996 |
| (Peru) | Peru | Óscar de la Puente Raygada; Efrain Goldenberg | 1992-1993; 1993-1995 |
| (Suriname) | Suriname | Subhas Mungra | 1991-1996 |
| (Uruguay) | Uruguay | Héctor Gros Espiell; Sergio Abreu Bonilla | 1990-1993; 1993-1995 |
| (Venezuela) | Venezuela | Fernando Ochoa Antich | 1992-1994 |
