= Alusine Fofanah =

Alusine Fofanah may refer to:

- Alusine Fofanah (politician) (fl. 1990s), Sierra Leonean diplomat and scholar
- Alusine Fofanah (soccer) (born 1997), Australian football player
