= Karefa =

Karefa is an African given name and surname. Notable people with the name include:

- Karefa Kargbo, Sierra Leonean politician
- John Karefa-Smart (1915–2010), Sierra Leonean politician, medical doctor, and university professor
- Rena Karefa-Smart (1921–2019), American theologian, university professor, ecumenical leader
