= Abdul Karim Koroma =

Sierra Leonean politician

Abdul Karim Koroma (born 25 September 1944 in Mabonto, Tonkolili District) is a former Sierra Leonean politician. Koroma served in the Sierra Leonean government as Minister of Education (1977–1982), Regional Minister of the Northern Province (1982–1985), and foreign minister (1985–1992). From 1998 to 2000, Koroma served on the President's National Policy Advisory Committee during the end of the Sierra Leone Civil War. He has also been the High Commissioner to Australia. Author of the following publications: (1) Sierra Leone The Agony of a Nation and (2) Crisis and Intervention in Sierra Leone 1996 to 2003. Andromeda Publications

Political offices
Preceded by Lecturer in History, Freetown Teachers College, Sierra Leone. Holds Bachelor of Arts Degree in History and Politics Durham University (U.K.), And Master of Science, Social Science in International Relations, Southampton University in U.K.	Education Minister of Sierra Leone; 1977–1982	Succeeded by unknown
Preceded by Sheka Hassan Kanu	Minister of Foreign Affairs of Sierra Leone; 1985–1992	Succeeded by Ahmed Ramadan Dumbuya
