= Africa Group for Justice and Accountability =

International non-governmental group

The Africa Group for Justice and Accountability (AGJA) is an international, non-governmental group made up of public figures, academics, lawyers and human rights advocates. Its stated purpose is to advocate for justice and accountability for international crimes.

It endeavours to build the capacity of African judiciaries to investigate and prosecute crimes. It has also issued public statements on global justice and human rights.

== History ==
The group was established in 2015 with a mandate to “strengthen justice and accountability measures in Africa through domestic and regional capacity building, advice and outreach, and enhancing cooperation between Africa and the International Criminal Court”.

In 2016 it established five core operating principles, which it calls the Kilimanjaro Principles on Justice and Accountability.

The Wayamo Foundation serves as AGJA´s secretariat.

== Members ==
There are currently 12 members.

- Abdul Tejan-Cole, former attorney at the Special Court for Sierra Leone
- Athaliah Molokomme, ambassador and permanent representative of Botswana to Switzerland and the UN office in Geneva
- Betty Kaari Murungi, Advocate of the High Court of Kenya
- Catherine Samba-panza, former transitional president of the Central African Republic
- Dapo Akande professor of public international law at the University of Oxford
- Fatiha Serour, director of Serour Associates for Inclusion and Equity, former Deputy Special Representative of the UN Secretary General in Somalia
- Hassan Bubacar Jallow, Chief Justice of The Gambia and current AGJA Chairman
- Mohamed Chande Othman, former Chief Justice of Tanzania
- Navanethem “Navi” Pillay, former UN High Commissioner for Human Rights
- Richard J. Goldstone, former Chief Prosecutor of the United Nations International Criminal Tribunals for the former Yugoslavia and Rwanda
- Tiyanjana Maluwa, H. Laddie Montague Chair in Law, Pennsylvania State University School of Law

== Activities and campaigns ==
=== “Fighting Impunity and Ensuring Accountability in East Africa” project ===
AGJA and its partner organisation, the Wayamo Foundation, are providing training to investigators, prosecutors and judges on international criminal justice and transnational organised crime, organising public outreach activities, and building diplomatic and political collaboration with regional and international stakeholders. In order to strengthen regional cooperation, AGJA and Wayamo support the establishment of an East African network of Directors of Public Prosecution and Heads of Criminal Investigation Departments.

=== Capacity Building Workshops for the Members of the Special Criminal Court in the Central African Republic ===
The Africa Group has been working with the authorities of the Central African Republic since September 2016, to support the establishment and operationalisation of the Special Criminal Court (SCC) in Bangui. The AGJA and the Wayamo Foundation have been organising international Symposia to raise awareness of the court, as well as capacity building workshops for the newly nominated members of the SCC to support the operationalisation of the court.

=== Transitional Justice Advice to The Gambia ===
At the request of Attorney General and Minister of Justice Mr. Aboubacarr Tambadou, AGJA and the Wayamo Foundation provided a joint expert advisory report on the Truth, Reparation and Reconciliation Commission Bill.

=== The Hybrid Justice Project ===
AGJA is participating in the Hybrid Justice Project, launched in January 2017, which analyses the impact of hybrid justice mechanisms in post-conflict societies. The project also aims at producing guidelines for future hybrid courts as well as a policy advice for the ICC on their complementarity role.

=== Advocacy on international criminal justice issues in Africa ===
AGJA seeks to improve relations between African states and the ICC. It issues regular public statements in response to developments relating to this relationship (E.g.: Statements on South Africa, The Gambia, and Burundi).
