= UN Action Against Sexual Violence in Conflict =

Cross-UN initiative

United Nations Action Against Sexual Violence in Conflict (UN Action) a cross-UN initiative that unites the work of 24 United Nations entities tasked with the goal of ending sexual violence in conflict. The 24 UN entities are from sectors that include peacekeeping, political affairs, justice, human rights, humanitarian, health, gender equality and women's empowerment. The Special Representative of the Secretary-General Pramila Patten chairs the network, which represents an effort by the UN to improve its coordination and accountability, amplify advocacy, and support national efforts to prevent sexual violence and respond effectively to the needs of survivors. The UN Action Secretariat is based in the Office of the Special Representative of the Secretary-General on Sexual Violence in Conflict.

== Areas of focus ==
UN Action has three main pillars of activity:

1. Country-Level Action: support to United Nations Action Against Sexual Violence in Conflict at country level, including efforts to build capacity and train advisers in gender-based violence programming and coordination, as well as targeted support for joint UN programming in selected countries,
2. Advocating for Action: action to raise public awareness and generate political will to address sexual violence as part of a broader campaign to Stop Rape Now,
3. Learning by Doing: creation of a knowledge hub on sexual violence in conflict and effective responses.

== Members ==
UN Action is composed of 24 UN entities including

- Department of Peacekeeping Operations (DPO)
- International Labour Organization (ILO)
- International Organization for Migration (IOM)
- International Trade Centre (ITC)
- Joint United Nations Program of HIV/AIDS (UNAIDS)
- Office for the Coordination of Humanitarian Affairs (OCHA)
- Office of the High Commissioner for Human Rights (OHCHR)
- Office of the Special Representative of the Secretary-General for Children and Armed Conflict (OSRSG/CAAC)
- Office of the Special Representative of the Secretary-General on Violence against Children (OSRSG-VAC)
- United Nations Children's Fund (UNICEF)
- United Nations Counter-Terrorism Committee Executive Directorate (CTED)
- United Nations Department of Global Communications (UNDGC)
- United Nations Department of Political Affairs (DPA)
- United Nations Development Programme (UNDP)
- United Nations Entity for Gender Equality and the Empowerment of Women (UN Women)
- United Nations Environment Programme (UNEP)
- United Nations High Commissioner for Refugees (UNHCR)
- United Nations Office for Disarmament Affairs (UNODA)
- United Nations Office on Drugs and Crime (UNODC)
- United Nations Office on Genocide Prevention (OSAPG)
- United Nations Peacebuilding Support Office (UN-PBSO)
- United Nations Population Fund (UNFPA)
- World Food Programme (WFP)
- World Health Organization (WHO)
