= Momodu Koroma =

Sierra Leonean politician (born 1956)

Momodu Koroma (born 1956 in Yonibana, Tonkolili District, British Sierra Leone) is a Sierra Leonean politician. He is a former Minister of Foreign Affairs and a member of the Sierra Leone Peoples Party (SLPP). He became foreign minister in May 2002, as part of a new cabinet appointed following President Ahmed Tejan Kabbah's re-election earlier in the month. Koroma had previously been Minister of Presidential Affairs. Koroma was born in the small town of Yonibana in the Tonkolili District, his father was from the Temne ethnic group, while his mother came from the Mende ethnic group. It is very rare in Sierra Leone to see inter-ethnic marriages between Sierra Leone's two largest ethnic group the Temne and Mende.

On 2 July 2007, he was named as the vice-presidential candidate of the ruling Sierra Leone People's Party (SLPP) in the August 2007 election. He was the running mate of SLPP presidential candidate Solomon Berewa. The SLPP was defeated by the All People's Congress (APC) in the election.

Political offices
Preceded by Ahmed Ramadan Dumbuya	Minister of Foreign Affairs of Sierra Leone; 2002–2007	Succeeded by Zainab Bangura
