= Ginyo Ganev =

Bulgarian politician

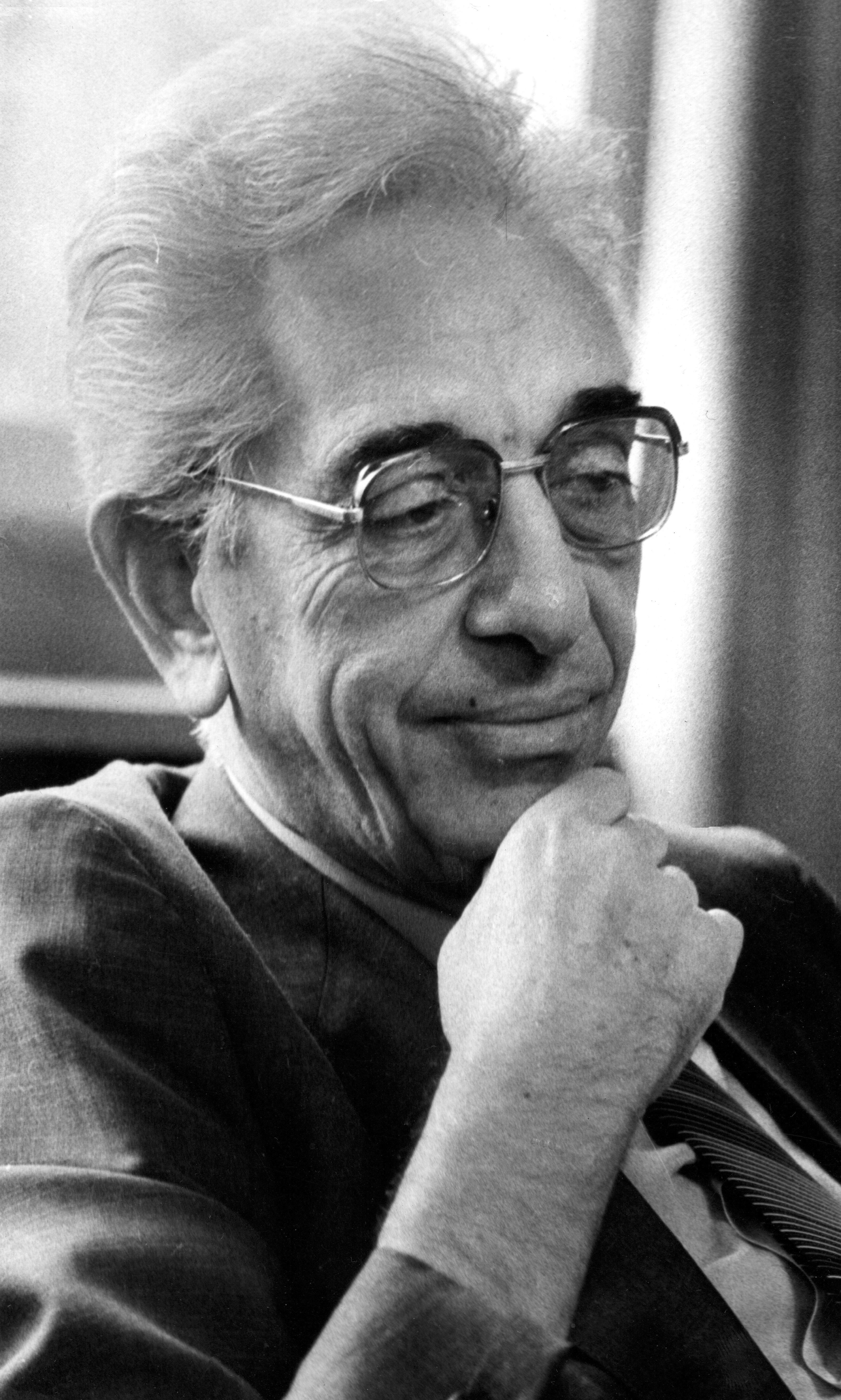

1st Ombudsman of Bulgaria
- In office 13 April 2005 – 20 October 2010
- Preceded by: Position established
- Succeeded by: Konstantin Penchev

Personal details
- Born: 2 March 1928 Burgas, Bulgaria
- Died: 18 December 2016 (aged 88) Sofia, Bulgaria
- Spouse: Maria Georgieva
- Education: Sofia University
- Occupation: Politician, lawyer

Ginyo Gochev Ganev (Bulgarian: Гиньо Гочев Ганев; 2 March 1928 – 18 December 2016) was a prominent Bulgarian politician, MP and national ombudsman. He is known as "Man-Parliament" as a deputy in 8 consecutive National Assemblies (3 before 10 November 1989 and 5 thereafter). On 13 April 2005 he was selected from the 39 National Assembly for the first National Ombudsman of the Republic of Bulgaria.

He graduated from the Law Faculty of Sofia University. Then he married the daughter of Kimon Georgiev, the first Prime Minister of Bulgaria after the 1944 coup d'état.

After graduation, he became legal adviser to the initially led by his father-in law Department of Energy from 1953 to 1977. In 1977 he was elected secretary of the National Council of the Fatherland Front, where he remained until 1989.

Ganev is a member of the State Council of the People's Republic of Bulgaria from 1986 to 1990. He refused twice to become Prime minister of Bulgaria – so his place took Dimitar Popov and Lyuben Berov.

He was awarded the Georgi Dimitrov Order. On the occasion of his 75th birthday he was awarded with the Stara Planina Order by President Georgi Parvanov.

Ganev was married to Mariya Georgieva from 1953 until hеr death in 1986, the daughter of Kimon Georgiev. They had two sons – Kimon (psychiatrist) and Ivaylo (engineer), two grandsons and two granddaughters.

== Awards ==
- 1978 – Order of the People's Republic of Bulgaria II class "for the 50th anniversary of his birth and to actively participate in the construction of socialism."
- 2003 – Order of Stara Planina I class for his 75th birthday.
- 2008 – Order of Saints Cyril and Methodius for his 80th birthday

== Works ==
- Избрани произведения. София: Партиздат, 1982
- Style: Сентенции. София: Еркюл, 1991, 72 с.
- Викове и шепот. София: Сиела, 1997
- Парламентарен говор и безмълвие. Пловдив: Пигмалион, 2000, 246 с.
- Измислени цитати. София: Сиела, 2003
- Три държавни преврата или Кимон Георгиев и неговото време. София: Сиела, 2007
- Омбудсманиада. София: Сиела, 2010
