= Timothy Kabba =

Sierra Leonean politician

Timothy Musa Kabba
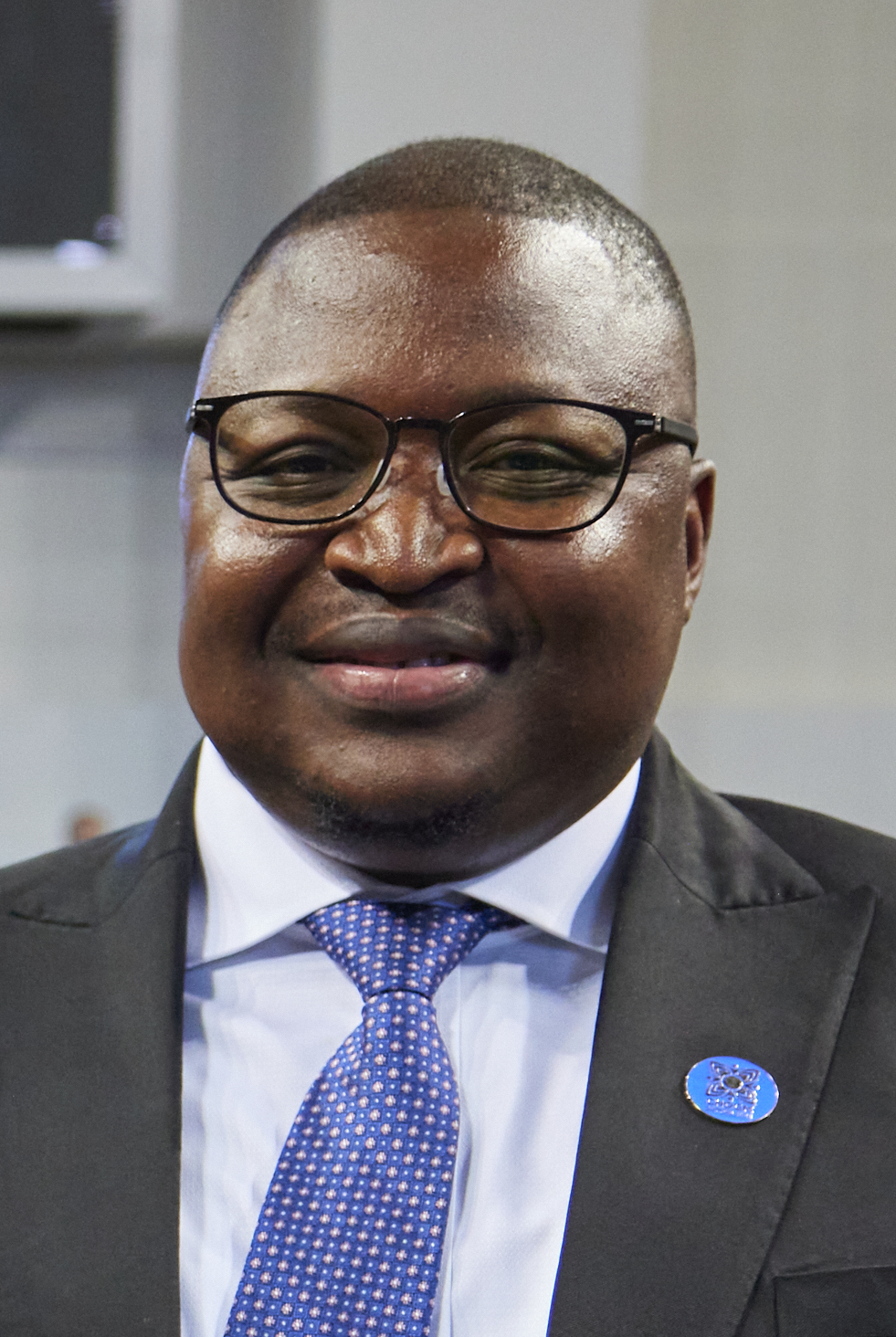

Foreign Minister of Sierra Leone
- Incumbent
- Assumed office 2023
- President: Julius Maada Bio
- Preceded by: David J. Francis

Personal details
- Born: Timothy Musa Kabba Kenema District, Sierra Leone
- Party: Sierra Leone People's Party
- Education: Fourah Bay College

Timothy Musa Kabba is a Sierra Leonean petroleum engineer, diplomat and politician, currently the Minister Of Foreign Affairs for the Republic of Sierra Leone. He previously served as the minister of Mines and Mineral Resources and also held the position of Director-General at the petroleum directorate in Sierra Leone.

== Early life and education ==
He was born in the Kenema District in the Eastern Province of Sierra Leone. He graduated from Fourah Bay College.

== Professional career ==
Kabba began his career as an Engineer at Rosneft, a significant Russian oil company, from July 2008 to July 2009. Following this role, he transitioned into the private sector, accumulating substantial experience in the energy industry with LUKOIL, a multinational energy corporation. Serving as a Reservoir Engineer from September 2011 to September 2017 and as a Wellsite Drilling Engineer from January 2011 to December 2017, Mr. Kabba operated across diverse regions including Ghana, Ivory Coast, Sierra Leone, the Middle East, and Russia.

== Government of Sierra Leone ==
Transitioning from the private sector to governmental roles, Kabba assumed the position of Executive Director General of the Petroleum Directorate Sierra Leone from July 2018 to July 2020, overseeing operations within the organization. Subsequently, he served as the Minister of Mines and Mineral Resources for the Government of Sierra Leone from July 2020 to September 2023, contributing to the strategic management of natural resources within the country. Currently, Mr. Kabba serves as the Minister of Foreign Affairs and International Cooperation for the Government of Sierra Leone, a role he undertook in July 2023.

== Personal life ==
He is fluent in English, French and Russian. On June 12, 2024, Timothy Musa Kabba announced on Twitter that he had been granted the favor to perform Hajj on the special invite of His Royal Highness, the Custodian of the Two Holy Mosques of Mecca.
