= Samir Shihabi =

Saudi Arabian diplomat (1925–2010)

Samir al Shihabi
- سمير الشهابي

President of the United Nations General Assembly
- In office 1991–1992
- Preceded by: Guido de Marco
- Succeeded by: Stoyan Ganev

Personal details
- Born: 27 May 1925
- Died: 25 August 2010 (aged 85)

Samir al Shihabi (Arabic: سمير الشهابي; 27 May 1925 – 25 August 2010) was a Palestine-born Saudi lawyer who served as President of the United Nations General Assembly from 1991 to 1992.

== Early life and education ==
Shihabi was born in Jerusalem on 27 May 1925. He did his undergraduate work at the American University of Cairo (AUC), and his graduate work at the Yale Law School and the University of Cambridge.

== Career ==
One of the most prominent Saudi diplomats of his generation, Shihabi joined the Saudi Ministry of Foreign Affairs in 1949. He rose quickly to become Charge d'Affairs in Italy in 1959 and then served as Saudi Ambassador to Turkey from 1964 to 1973, Ambassador to Somalia for six months in 1974 and then assumed the post of Deputy Foreign Minister early in the tenure of Foreign Minister Saud Al Faisal. He was then appointed Ambassador to Pakistan in 1979, before becoming Saudi Arabia's Permanent Representative to the United Nations in 1983.

In 1991, he was elected as President of the United Nations General Assembly. His final diplomatic posting, in 1994, was as Ambassador to Switzerland after which he retired in 1999.

His career was marked by a close personal and working relationship with the late King Faisal and also the late King Fahd. He carried out sensitive missions for King Faisal in support of Saudi efforts to limit Soviet influence in the region. With King Fahd he worked closely on the Afghanistan file, post the Soviet invasion.

His posting to Pakistan in 1979 was directly related to these efforts, and to putting in place the military alliance between Pakistan and Saudi Arabia that by the early 1980s had over 10,000 Pakistani troops posted in the Kingdom.

His election to the Presidency of the U.N General Assembly in 1991, was one of the few hard-fought elections for what had traditionally been a consensus appointment by rotation among regions.

This followed the Gulf War and the deep split in the Middle East between pro-Saddam Iraq nations and the GCC. Shihabi had also entered the race very late in the game, months after three other candidates had already declared their intent to run, including the Foreign Minister of Yemen and also after the US and UK governments had publicly pledged their support for another candidate (a Foreign Minister of a British Commonwealth country). His surprise victory, and by a wide margin, was commented on by the New York Times and Time magazine.

== Personal life ==
Shihabi married Norwegian-born (Widad) Kari Stonjum. They met in 1946 at Cambridge University where he was studying. They then settled in Saudi Arabia. Their son, Ali Shihabi, is a former chairman of a bank and an author and Founder of the Arabia Foundation in Washington DC.

== Death ==
Shihabi died on 20 August 2010, in Portugal, Algarve, where he retired.

Diplomatic posts
Preceded by Guido de Marco	President of the United Nations General Assembly; 1991–1992	Succeeded by Stoyan Ganev
