= Lyuben Berov =

Bulgarian politician and economist (1925–2006)

- Любен Беров
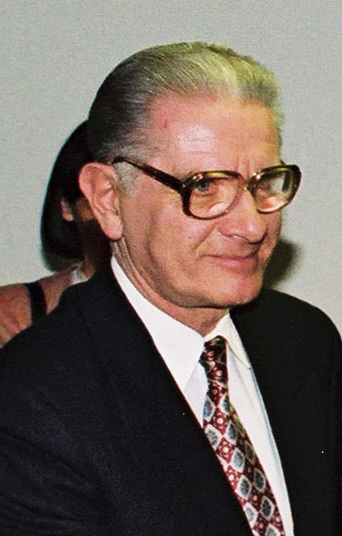
- Berov in 1993

Prime Minister of Bulgaria
- In office 30 December 1992 – 17 October 1994
- President: Zhelyu Zhelev
- Deputy: Neycho Neev
- Preceded by: Philip Dimitrov
- Succeeded by: Reneta Indzhova

Minister of Foreign Affairs
- In office 30 December 1992 – 23 June 1993
- Prime Minister: Himself
- Preceded by: Stoyan Ganev
- Succeeded by: Stanislav Daskalov

Personal details
- Born: Lyuben Borisov Berov; 6 October 1925 Sofia, Tsardom of Bulgaria
- Died: 7 December 2006 (aged 81) Sofia, Bulgaria
- Party: Independent
- Spouse: Tanya Berova
- Children: 2
- Occupation: Politician; economist

Lyuben Borisov Berov (Bulgarian: Любен Борисов Беров; 6 October 1925 – 7 December 2006) was a Bulgarian economist who served as the Prime Minister of Bulgaria from 1992 to 1994. A political independent, he previously held the role of an economic adviser to President Zhelyu Zhelev.

== See also ==
- List of foreign ministers in 1993
- Foreign relations of Bulgaria
- List of Bulgarians
- History of Bulgaria since 1989

Political offices
Preceded by Philip Dimitrov	Prime Minister of Bulgaria; 1992–1994	Succeeded by Reneta Indzhova
Preceded by Stoyan Ganev	Foreign Minister of Bulgaria; 30 December 1992 – 23 June 1993	Succeeded by Stanislav Daskalov
