= Ivan Stanchov =

Bulgarian politician and diplomat (1929–2021)

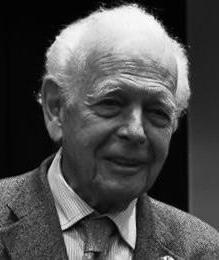
Ivan Stanchov

Ivan Ivanov Stanchov (1 April 1929 – 24 November 2021) was a Bulgarian politician and diplomat who served as Minister of Foreign Affairs. He served in the non-party, interim Cabinet led by Prime Minister Reneta Indzhova from 1994 and 1995.

Political offices
Preceded by Stanislav Daskalov	Minister of Foreign Affairs of Bulgaria; 1994–1995	Succeeded by Georgi Pirinski Jr.
