= Cyril Foray =

Sierra Leonean politician and historian (1934–2003)

Cyril Patrick Foray

6th Minister of Foreign Affairs of Sierra Leone
- In office 1969–1971
- Monarch: Elizabeth II
- Preceded by: Luseni A.M. Brewah
- Succeeded by: Solomon Athanasius James Pratt

Personal details
- Born: 16 March 1934 Rotifunk, Moyamba, British Sierra Leone
- Died: 31 July 2003 (aged 69) Freetown, Sierra Leone
- Party: All People's Congress (APC)
- Spouse: Arabella

Professor Cyril Patrick Foray (16 March 1934 – 31 July 2003) was a Sierra Leonean educator, politician, diplomat and historian.

== Early life ==
Foray was a graduate of St. Edward's Secondary School. He continued his education at Fourah Bay College (then affiliated with Durham University) and eventually moved on to Durham proper, where he was a member of St Cuthbert's Society.

== Public service ==
Professor Foray was widely considered one of the most respected and accomplished men of his generation. He spent his life serving his country in a variety of roles.

=== Cabinet Minister ===
Foray was a member of the All People's Congress (APC) party of Sierra Leone. He served as a cabinet minister to Siaka Stevens.

=== Foreign minister ===
Foray was appointed Sierra Leone's Foreign Minister from 1969 to 1971. After an alleged coup attempt by Foray's close friend Brigadier John Bangura, Stevens asked for his resignation.

=== High Commissioner to the Court of St. James ===
He served as the Sierra Leone High Commissioner to the Court of St. James's in London under two governments: Valentine Strasser's short-lived NPRC military regime and Ahmad Tejan Kabbah's.

==== Real-estate debacle ====
By the time Foray arrived at his new post in London, years of corruption and the astronomical cost of the Sierra Leone Civil War had depleted the financial resources of the government. The office of the Sierra Leone High Commission was located at the exclusive address of 33 Portland Place, in Mayfair. However, when Foray took up residence at the five-story mansion, it had fallen into a state of hazardous disrepair. More than one ceiling had caved in and the Sierra Leonean government was unable to cover the cost of restorations and even the most basic maintenance. Because of the deteriorating state of the property, the landlord threatened eviction. Before it came to this, Foray decided to downsize and downscale so that he could successfully run the high commission on the limited budget available to him. The remaining 20 years on the lease were sold for £50,000 to Edward Davenport's property development firm Capricorn Investments.

Outraged by the paltry profit from the sale, the Sierra Leonean government sued Capricorn Investments and accused Davenport of being a war profiteer. Foray resigned from office on Friday, 28 April 2000. The Sierra Leonean government proceeded to file a suit against him in 2000. However, the government lost both cases when it was proven that Capricorn Investments paid a fair price for the dilapidated 24-room mansion. Foray was cleared of any wrongdoing when the court determined that at the time of the sale the property at 33 Portland Place was in need of several million pounds' worth of repairs.

=== Scholar ===
Foray was always passionate about education and teaching. He was appointed head of the history department at Fourah Bay College and later became Chancellor.

=== Historian ===
Foray is the author of several history books, including: An Outline of Fourah Bay College History (1827–1977) and The Road to the One-Party State: The Sierra Leone Experience and Historical Dictionary of Sierra Leone.

== Death ==
On 31 July 2003, Professor Foray suffered a massive heart attack and died in Freetown, Sierra Leone, aged 69.

Political offices
Preceded by Luseni A.M. Brewah	Minister of Foreign Affairs of Sierra Leone; 1969–1972	Succeeded by Solomon Athanasius James Pratt
Preceded by unknown	High Commissioner to the Court of St. James's; 1993–1994 and 1996	Succeeded by unknown
Preceded by unknown	Chancellor of Forah Bay College; 1969–1972	Succeeded by unknown
