= Ahmed Ramadan Dumbuya =

Sierra Leonean politician

Ahmed Ramadan Dumbuya is a former Sierra Leonean politician. Dumbuya served as foreign minister twice; for a brief time in 1992 and from 2001 to 2002. He is a member of the Susu ethnic group.

Political offices
Preceded by Abdul Karim Koroma	Minister of Foreign Affairs of Sierra Leone; 1992	Succeeded by Mohamed Lamin Kamara
Preceded by Sama Banya	Minister of Foreign Affairs of Sierra Leone; 2001–2002	Succeeded by Momodu Koroma
