= Neycho Neev =

Bulgarian politician

Personal details
- Born: 9 February 1948 (age 78) Prisadets, Haskovo Province, Bulgaria
- Profession: Politician

Neycho Hristov Neev (Bulgarian: Нейчо Христов Неев) (born 9 February 1948) is a Bulgarian politician who served as vice-Prime Minister and Minister of Transport in the Berov government from December 1992 to June 1993.

Between 1980 and 1989, he was employed as the main energy specialist in Kremikovtzi. In the early 1990s, Neev was a member of the UDF before turning to business in 1995.
