= Nabeela Tunis =

Sierra Leonean politician

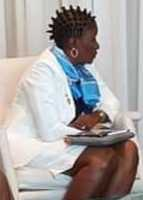
Nabeela Tunis in 2019

Nabeela Farida Tunis (née Koroma) is a Sierra Leonean politician who served as the country's Foreign Minister from May 2019 to October 2021 and Minister of Tourism since October 2023.

== Education and early career ==
Tunis has a Bachelor of Arts in political science from Fourah Bay College and English and a Master's in Rural Development from Njala University, both part of the University of Sierra Leone. She worked as Program Manager of the Women's Network for Environmental Sustainability and as a Senior National Officer within the United Nations office in Sierra Leone.

== Political career ==
Tunis was appointed the Minister of Planning and Economic Development on 8 May 2018. In this role she helped produce the president's National Economic Development Plan, but was also responsible for a controversial NGO policy that activists considered "unfriendly".

Tunis was appointed Foreign Minister in a cabinet reshuffle by President Julius Maada Bio in May 2019, replacing 2018 presidential candidate Alie Kabba, who was demoted to the role of UN representative. She has described her foreign policy direction as "Sierra Leone first" and said that her foreign policy objectives are linked to boosting the country's image and prestige, including transparency in business as part of the president's renewed fight against corruption.

In April 2021, Tunis was replaced by David J. Francis as Foreign Minister and given the new cabinet role of Minister of the Western Region. In October 2023, President Bio appointed her as the Minister for Tourism.

== Awards and honours ==
Tunis was named one of Sierra Leone's Fifty Most Influential Women in 2019 and nominated again for the award in 2020.

== Personal life ==
Tunis is married to Sidie Mohammed Tunis, the Parliamentary Leader of the governing Sierra Leone People's Party and former Speaker of the ECOWAS Parliament. They have three children.
