= Fatiha Serour =

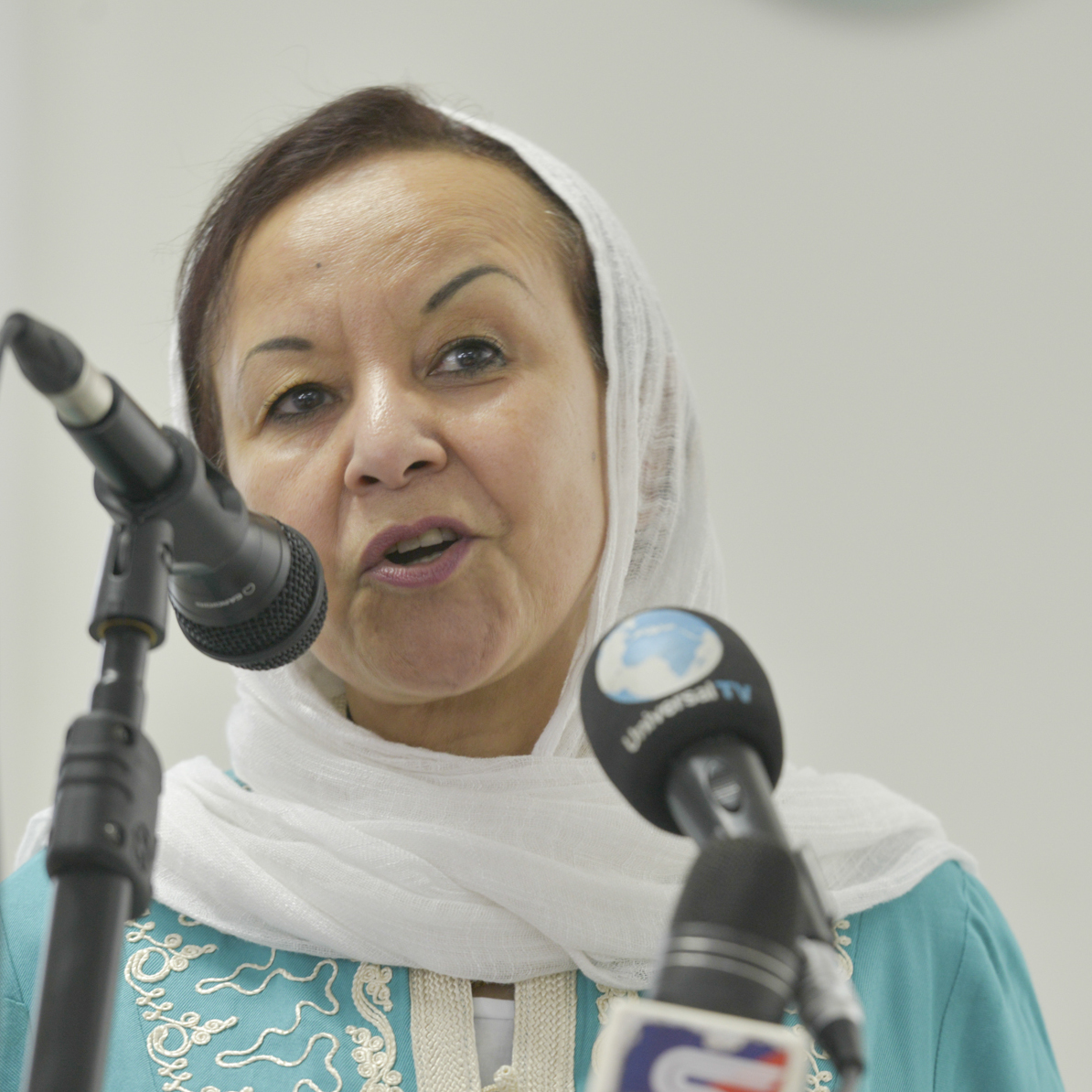
- in 2014

United Nations Deputy Special Representative for Somalia
- Incumbent
- Assumed office 3 June 2013
- Appointed by: Ban Ki-moon
- Preceded by: Peter de Clerq

Fatiha Serour (Arabic: الفاتحة سرور) was the Deputy Special Representative for Somalia. She was appointed to this position by United Nations Secretary-General Ban Ki-moon on 30 October 2013.

== Biography ==
Fatiha Serour, an Algerian national, studied at the University of Aberdeen, where she received a Ph.D. in Development Strategies for Africa. She also holds a Master of Arts in International Relations from the University of Lille, France.

Serour has held numerous posts within the United Nations, including as senior adviser in the Department of Economic and Social Affairs and with the United Nations Assistance Mission in Afghanistan, UNAMA, and most recently, the United Nations Office for Project Services. She has also held the post of Director of Youth at the Commonwealth Secretariat.

Before taking up her post as Deputy Special Representative for Somalia, Serour was a Director with Serour Associates for Inclusion and Equity.
