= Pramila Patten =

Mauritian barrister, women's rights activist, and United Nations official (born 1958)

Pramila Patten GOSK
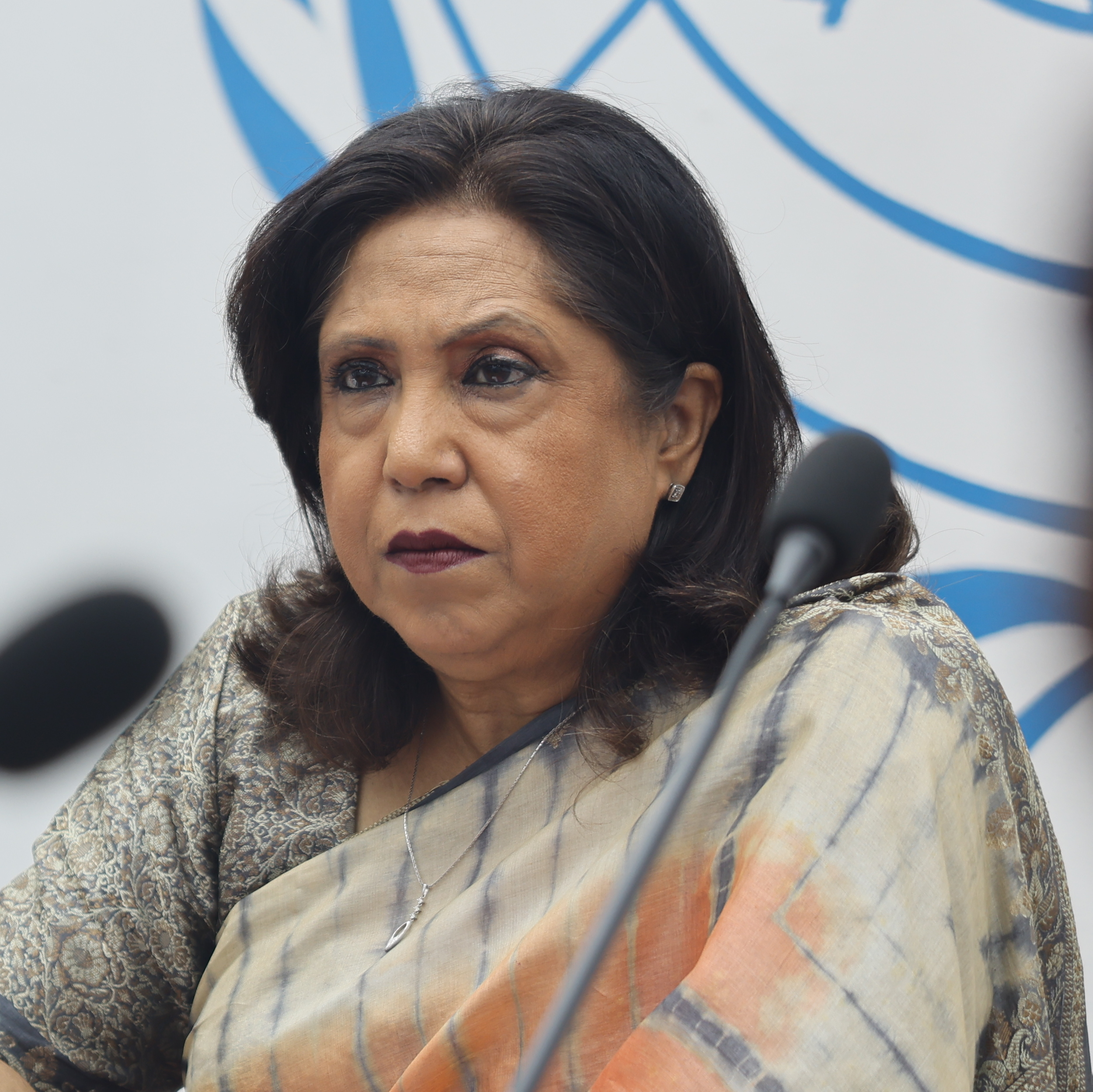
- Patten in 2025

United Nations Special Representative on Sexual Violence in Conflict
- Incumbent
- Assumed office 12 April 2017
- Preceded by: Zainab Bangura

Member of the United Nations Committee on the Elimination of Discrimination Against Women
- In office 2003–2017

Personal details
- Born: June 29, 1958 (age 67) British Mauritius
- Occupation: Lawyer

Pramila Patten (/prəˈmɪlə ˈpætən/; born 29 June 1958) is a Mauritian barrister, women's rights activist, and United Nations official, who currently serves as the United Nations Special Representative on Sexual Violence in Conflict and Under-Secretary-General of the United Nations; she was appointed in 2017. Her office was established by Security Council Resolution 1888, introduced by Hillary Clinton, and she succeeded Margot Wallström and Zainab Bangura.

Patten served as a member of the United Nations Committee on the Elimination of Discrimination Against Women from 2003 to 2017, and was the committee's vice chairperson.

== Early life and education ==
Patten obtained a Bachelor of Laws (LL.B.) at the University of London, a Diploma in Criminology at King's College, Cambridge, a Master of Laws (LL.M.) at the University of London and was called to the bar in England as a member of Gray's Inn.

== Career ==
Patten practised as a barrister in England from 1982 to 1986 before she returned to Mauritius, where she served as a district court judge between 1987 and 1988, and from 1987 to 1992 as a lecturer at the Faculty of Law of the University of Mauritius. Since 1995, she has been the director of the law firm Patten & Co Chambers.

Patten was a member of the International Women's Rights Action Watch between 1993 and 2002, and from 2000 to 2004 she was a consultant to the Ministry of Gender Equality, Child Development and Family Welfare of Mauritius.

Patten was elected as a member of the United Nations Committee on the Elimination of Discrimination Against Women in 2003. At times, she served as the committee's vice chairperson. In 2017, she resigned from the committee.

In 2022, she was awarded an honorary degree from the University of Ottawa.

=== United Nations Special Representatives, 2017–present ===
On 12 April 2017, Patten was appointed by UN Secretary-General António Guterres as Special Representative on Sexual Violence in Conflict with the rank of Under-Secretary-General of the United Nations.

In November 2017, Patten visited Bangladesh to interview survivors of the 2016 Rohingya persecution in Myanmar.

That same month, she welcomed the Elsie Initiative to help increase women's participation in peacekeeping operations in a joint statement with fellow UN Under-Secretary-General and Executive Director of UN Women Phumzile Mlambo-Ngcuka.

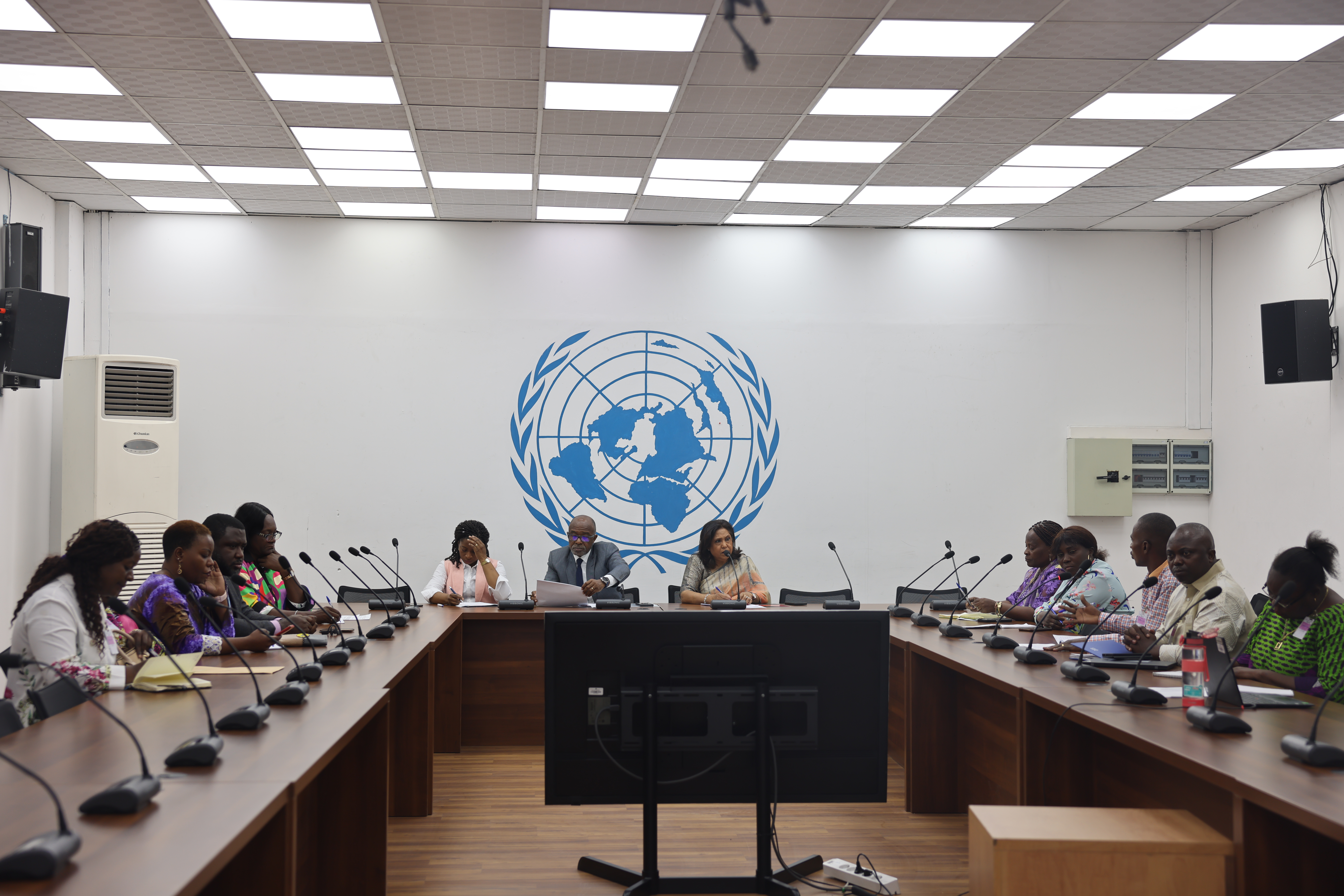
Pramila Patten in Kinshasa in July 2025

In February 2025 she spoke out against the increasing levels of sexual violence in the DRC. In July she visited Kinshasa and met with Mireille Masangu who is the DRC's responsible minister to discuss the devastating sexual violence against women and very small children. Patten visited the Bulengo camp near Goma which held over 120,000 people (in 2023). The DRC's army is on the UN blacklist for the number of rapes carried out by its soldiers. At the meeting General Batabombi Apanza said that over 1,300 soldiers had either been convicted or were under investigation.
