= Karefa Kargbo =

Sierra Leonean politician

- Born: 1967 (age 58–59)
- Citizenship: Sierra Leone
- Occupation: Politician diplomat Minister
- Employer: National Provisional Ruling Council
- Known for: Minister of Foreign Affairs and International Cooperation

Karefa Kargbo (born in August 1967) is a Sierra Leonean politician. He was the foreign minister under Valentine Strasser in 1993 and 1994 under the National Provisional Ruling Council, the military coup that overthrew Joseph Saidu Momoh as president.

He is the Chief Accountant at the Petroleum Resources Unit {PRU} he was appointed by Ernest Bai Koroma.

== Early life ==
Kargbo served in the Sierra Leone Armed Forces and later built a professional career in finance and accounting. He is a certified public accountant and has worked in both the public and private sectors, gaining experience in financial management and corporate governance. He later held senior financial and administrative roles in government institutions and international organizations.

== Career ==
During the rule of the National Provisional Ruling Council, Kargbo served as Minister of Foreign Affairs of Sierra Leone from 1993 to 1994, under the military government led by Valentine Strasser.

As foreign minister, he represented Sierra Leone in international diplomacy and addressed the United Nations General Assembly during the 48th session in 1993, where Sierra Leone participated in debates on global political and economic issues.

He succeeded Mohamed Lamin Kamara and was later replaced by Abass Bundu as foreign minister in 1994.

After his tenure in government, Kargbo continued to work in financial administration and public sector management. He later served in senior roles related to the management of Sierra Leone’s natural resource sector, including leadership positions connected to the Sierra Leone Mines and Minerals Development and Management Corporation (SLMMDMC)

Political offices
Preceded by Mohamed Lamin Kamara	Minister of Foreign Affairs of Sierra Leone; 1993–1994	Succeeded by Abass Bundu
