= Mohamed Lamin Kamara =

Sierra Leonean politician

Mohamed Lamin Kamara (born 1943) is a former Sierra Leonean politician. Kamara served as foreign minister from 1992 to 1993. Under the Ahmed Tejan Kabbah administration, he was the deputy foreign minister.

Political offices
Preceded by Ahmed Ramadan Dumbuya	Minister of Foreign Affairs of Sierra Leone; 1992–1993	Succeeded by Karefa Kargbo
