= Sheka Hassan Kanu =

Sierra Leonean politician (1932–1998)

Sheka Hassan Kanu (1932–1998) was a Sierra Leonean politician.

== Biography ==
Kanu was born in 1932, in the Port Loko District. He earned a doctorate at the University of Alberta He was the Minister of Foreign Affairs and International Cooperation from 1984 to 1985. He then held the position of Minister of Finance from 1985 to 1987.

He also worked as an Ambassador, being Sierra Leone’s ambassador to West Germany in 1973.

He died in 1998.
