= Reneta Indzhova =

Prime Minister of Bulgaria

- Ренета Инджова
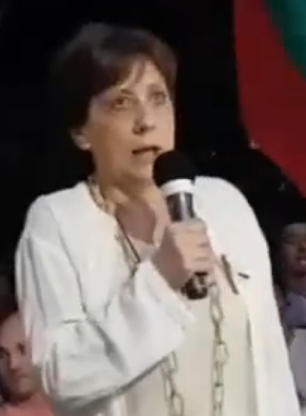
- Indzhova in 2020

Prime Minister of Bulgaria
- In office 17 October 1994 – 25 January 1995
- President: Zhelyu Zhelev
- Deputy: Hristina Vucheva; Ivailo Trifonov; Nikola Vasilev
- Preceded by: Lyuben Berov
- Succeeded by: Zhan Videnov

Personal details
- Born: Reneta Ivanova Indzhova; 6 July 1953 (age 73) Nova Zagora, PR Bulgaria
- Party: Independent
- Spouse: Boyan Slavenkov (divorced)
- Children: 1
- Education: University of National and World Economy
- Occupation: Politician; economist

Reneta Ivanova Indzhova (Bulgarian: Ренета Иванова Инджова; born 6 July 1953) is a Bulgarian economist who served as the caretaker Prime Minister of Bulgaria from 1994 to 1995, appointed by President Zhelyu Zhelev. A political independent, she is the first woman to have served as Prime Minister in Bulgaria. Prior to that, she chaired the Privatisation Agency and later on, from 2012 to 2014, she chaired the National Statistical Institute.

== Biography ==
Reneta Indzhova was born 6 July 1953 in Nova Zagora. She studied at the university, obtained a PhD and became professor of political economy. She married and had a child, but later divorced. She worked as a financial expert for the liberal-conservative Democratic Union (UDF) and was head of Bulgaria's Privatization Agency (1992–1994).

=== Interim Prime Minister of Bulgaria ===
Indzhova was appointed by President Zhelev, former leader of the UDF, to head a caretaker government after the collapse of Lyuben Berov's cabinet. During her brief time in office she gained some popularity for her efforts to combat organized crime.

=== Subsequent roles ===
In 1995 Indzhova ran for Mayor of Sofia as an independent, finishing third. In 2001 she took part in the presidential elections but failed to garner significant support.

In 2014 she appeared in the headlines for the first time in more than a decade. As head of the National Statistical Institute of Bulgaria, she accused her two direct subordinates for exerting undue political pressure in the institution.

== Notes ==
Political offices
Preceded by Lyuben Berov	Prime Minister of Bulgaria; 1994-1995	Succeeded by Zhan Videnov
