= Stanislav Daskalov =

Bulgarian politician

- Станислав Даскалов

Minister of Foreign Affairs
- In office 23 June 1993 – 17 October 1994
- Prime Minister: Lyuben Berov
- Preceded by: Lyuben Berov
- Succeeded by: Ivan Stanchov

Personal details
- Born: Stanislav Borisov Daskalov; 4 April 1952 Bezhanovo, PR Bulgaria
- Party: Independent
- Education: Moscow State Institute of International Relations
- Occupation: Politician; diplomat

Stanislav Penkov Daskalov is a Bulgarian politician and diplomat who served as the Minister of Foreign Affairs from 1993 to 1994. A political independent, he previously held various positions, including that of a deputy minister with a foreign trade portfolio. He negotiated the Europe Agreement of Bulgaria and was the deputy chief negotiator of Bulgaria's membership in the EU. He served as Bulgaria's first Permanent Representative of Bulgaria to the EU.

Daskalov was also exposed to have served from 1985 to 1989 as an agent and secret informant of the Committee for State Security, of the People’s Republic of Bulgaria.

Political offices
Preceded by Lyuben Berov	Minister of Foreign Affairs of Bulgaria; 1993–1994	Succeeded by Ivan Stanchov
