= Stoyan Ganev =

Bulgarian diplomat (1955–2013)

- Стоян Ганев

President of the United Nations General Assembly
- In office 1992–1993
- Preceded by: Samir Shihabi
- Succeeded by: Rudy Insanally

Personal details
- Born: July 23, 1955 Pazardzhik, Bulgaria
- Died: July 1, 2013 (aged 57) Greenwich, Connecticut, U.S.

Stoyan Ganev (Bulgarian: Стоян Ганев; July 23, 1955 – July 1, 2013) was a UN official, Bulgarian diplomat (foreign minister), politician (Union of Democratic Forces) and jurist.

== Early life ==
Ganev was born in Pazardzhik. He graduated from the high school in mathematics (1973) and studied at the Faculty of law in the Sofia University (1979). He defended a thesis on constitutional law at the Moscow State University (1985).

== Political career ==
- President of the United Nations General Assembly (1992 - 1993)
- Foreign minister of Bulgaria (November 8, 1991 – December 30, 1992)
- Deputy prime minister of Bulgaria (November 8, 1991 – May 20, 1992)
- Member of the Bulgarian Parliament from UDF (1990 - 1991, 1992 - 1993)
- President of the United Christian Democratic Union (former UDC, October 18, 1992 - May 16, 1993)
- Co-president of the United Democratic Center (UDC, April - July, 1990)

Lecturer:

- Sofia University, in Constitutional Law (1979 - 1989)
- G. Dimitrov Higher Special Institut (now Academy of the Ministry of Interior)
- Konrad Adenauer Foundation in Germany, in International politics and law
- Rotary International, in International politics and law
- University of Bridgeport
- New York University

Awards:

- Gold medal for peace for his contributions to the preservation of peace and security on the planet, the UN (1992)
- Great honorable Cross, the Association for the unity of Latin America (1992)

== Death ==
Ganev died aged 57 on July 1, 2013, in Greenwich, Connecticut, United States.

== See also ==
- List of foreign ministers in 1992
- Foreign relations of Bulgaria
- List of Bulgarians

Political offices
Preceded by Viktor Valkov	Foreign Minister of Bulgaria; 8 November 1991 – 30 December 1992	Succeeded by Lyuben Berov
Diplomatic posts
Preceded by Samir Shihabi	President of the United Nations General Assembly; 1992–1993	Succeeded by Rudy Insanally
