= Shirley Gbujama =

Sierra Leonean politician

Madam Shirley Yema Gbujama (born 1936, as Shirley Macaulay) is a Sierra Leonean politician who served in a number of cabinet positions, including minister for foreign affairs, minister of social welfare, minister of tourism and culture, and minister of gender and children’s affairs. She was one of the most respected and longest-serving cabinet ministers in President Ahmad Tejan Kabbah's government. Gbujama belongs to the Mende ethnic group.

== Early life and career ==
Gbujama was born in 1936 as Shirley Macaulay, in Kent, a coastal fishing village around the peninsular in the Western Area Rural District of British Sierra Leone. Her father was Fredrick Sherman Macaulay (ca. 1904–1986), a teacher, local politician, and later a justice of the peace. Her mother was Violet Keitel, a Methodist Mission School teacher from the Bonthe District. Her parents named her, their eldest daughter, after American actress Shirley Temple, a child star of the day.

Gbujama started her career as a school teacher in mathematics, in 1959. She then moved to New York City, in the United States, to pursue a Master of Arts degree in mathematics, graduating in 1964. She also worked as a Christian preacher.

== Diplomatic and political career ==
Gbujama was appointed as Sierra Leone's ambassador to Ethiopia, Tanzania and Zambia, presenting her credentials to Haile Selassie in Addis Ababa, and serving in that position from 1972 to 1976. She then moved back to New York City, where she served as the country's ambassador to the United Nations until 1978.

In 1996, Gbujama had a short stint as Minister of Tourism, before moving to the prestigious post of Minister of Foreign Affairs and International Cooperation in Ahmad Tejan Kabbah's government, succeeding Maigore Kallon.
