= Maigore Kallon =

Maigore Kallon (1 February 1929 – 5 March 2015) was a Sierra Leonean politician and diplomat. A founding member of the Sierra Leone People's Party (SLPP), he later served as the chairman of the party. Kallon served as the third Minister of Foreign Affairs and International Cooperation of Sierra Leone from 1965 to 1967. He briefly regained the position of Foreign Minister in 1996 during the first cabinet of President Ahmad Tejan Kabbah, a member of the SLPP.

== Political career ==
Kallon was one of the founding members of the Sierra Leone People's Party (SLPP), which was formed in 1951. Ten years later, he became the country's first Interior Minister of Sierra Leone following independence from the United Kingdom in 1961. He also served as the Chief Whip for the SLPP as a member of the Parliament of Sierra Leone. Kallon became Foreign Minister from 1965 to 1967.

Maigore Kallon went into exile in neighboring Liberia during the 1970s following a dispute with President Siaka Stevens. He returned to Sierra Leone during the 1980s once President Stevens had left office and Joseph Saidu Momoh had assumed the presidency.

Kallon played a pivotal role in SLPP's victory in the 1996 general election, which brought President Ahmad Tejan Kabbah to power. He was appointed Foreign Minister during Kabbah's first cabinet in 1996. Kallon later became the chairman of the SLPP.

== Personal life ==
Kallon was born in the Kailahun District, Sierra Leone, within the Jawei Chiefdom. Maigore Kallon died from a long illness at his home in Byrne Lane, Freetown, Sierra Leone, on 5 March 2015, at the age of 89.
