= Ministry of Foreign Affairs and International Cooperation (Sierra Leone) =

Government ministry of Sierra Leone

Agency overview
- Formed: 1961
- Jurisdiction: Government agency
- Headquarters: Freetown, Sierra Leone
- Agency executive: Timothy Kabba, Minister of Foreign Affairs
- Parent agency: Government of Sierra Leone

The Ministry of Foreign Affairs and International Cooperation is the foreign policy department of the Government of Sierra Leone.

The department issues Sierra Leonean visas to foreign nationals before visiting Sierra Leone, except foreign nationals of Economic Community of West African States (ECOWAS) States who do not require visas to visit other ECOWAS nations. All of Sierra Leone embassies abroad are part of the Ministry.

The Ministry's building is located in the capital Freetown, Sierra Leone. The Ministry is headed by the Minister of Foreign Affairs, who is appointed by the president of Sierra Leone and must be confirmed by the parliament of Sierra Leone before taking office. The Sierra Leone president has the constitutional authority to sack the Minister of Foreign Affairs at any time. The current Sierra Leone minister of Foreign Affairs and International Cooperation is Timothy Kabba.

== Duties ==
The duties of the Minister include:

- In charge of Sierra Leone Foreign policies
- Advises the president on Foreign policy issues
- Speak and lobby on the interest of Sierra Leone
- Gives or reject Visa to Foreign national visiting Sierra Leone, except citizens of Ecowas nations, who do not require visas
- Supervises Sierra Leone's embassies abroad; and supervises activities of Sierra Leonean diplomats
- Represent the Government of Sierra Leone in other country's
- maintains relations with other country's and international organizations
- Represent Sierra Leoneans in Foreign country's
- Gives basic information about other country's to Sierra Leoneans
