= Alusine Fofanah (politician) =

Sierra Leonean politician and diplomat

Alusine Fofanah is a Sierra Leonean politician and diplomat. A member of the Sierra Leone People's Party, Fofanah was the Minister of Foreign Affairs and International Cooperation from 1995–1996 and a member of Sierra Leone's Parliament for many years. He is also a lecturer in the graduate school for social sciences at Njala University.
