= List of foreign ministers in 2022 =

This is a list of foreign ministers in 2022.

== Africa ==
- Algeria – Ramtane Lamamra (2021–present)
- Angola – Tete António (2020–present)
- Benin – Aurélien Agbénonci (2016–2023)
- Botswana – Lemogang Kwape (2020–present)
- Burkina Faso –
  - Rosine Sori-Coulibaly (2021–2022)
  - Olivia Rouamba (2022–2023)
- Burundi – Albert Shingiro (2020–present)
- Cameroon – Lejeune Mbella Mbella (2015–present)
- Cape Verde – Rui Figueiredo Soares (2021–present)
- Central African Republic – Sylvie Baïpo-Temon (2018–present)
- Chad – Mahamat Zene Cherif (2017–2022)
- Comoros – Dhoihir Dhoulkamal (2020–present)
- Congo–Brazzaville (Republic of the Congo) – Jean-Claude Gakosso (2015–present)
- Congo–Kinshasa (Democratic Republic of the Congo) – Christophe Lutundula (2021–present)
- Djibouti – Mahamoud Ali Youssouf (2005–present)
- Egypt – Sameh Shoukry (2014–present)
- Equatorial Guinea – Simeón Oyono Esono Angue (2018–present)
- Eritrea – Osman Saleh Mohammed (2007–present)
- Ethiopia – Demeke Mekonnen (2020–present)
- Gabon –
  1. Pacôme Moubelet Boubeya (2020–2022)
  2. Michael Moussa Adamo (2022–2023)
- The Gambia – Mamadou Tangara (2018–present)
- Ghana – Shirley Ayorkor Botchway (2017–present)
- Guinea – Morissanda Kouyaté (2021–present)
- Guinea-Bissau – Suzi Barbosa (2020–2023)
- Ivory Coast (Côte d'Ivoire) – Kandia Camara (2021–2023)
- Kenya – Raychelle Omamo (2020–2022)
- Lesotho – 'Matšepo Ramakoae (2020–2022)
- Liberia – Dee-Maxwell Saah Kemayah, Sr (2020–present)
- Libya –
  - Najla Mangoush (2021–present)
  - Hafez Kaddour (2022–present)
- Madagascar –
  1. Patrick Rajoelina (2021–2022)
  2. Richard Randriamandrato (2022–present)
- Malawi –
  1. Eisenhower Mkaka (2020–2022)
  2. Nancy Tembo (2022–present)
- Mali – Abdoulaye Diop (2021–present)
- Mauritania – Ismail Ould Cheikh Ahmed (2018–2022)
- Mauritius – Alan Ganoo (2021–present)
- Morocco – Nasser Bourita (2017–present)
- Mozambique – Verónica Macamo (2020–present)
- Namibia – Netumbo Nandi-Ndaitwah (2012–present)
- Niger – Hassoumi Massaoudou (2021–2023)
- Nigeria – Geoffrey Onyeama (2015–2023)
- Rwanda – Vincent Biruta (2019–present)
- Sahrawi Arab Democratic Republic – Mohamed Salem Ould Salek (1998–2023)
- São Tomé and Príncipe – Edite Tenjua (2020–2022)
- Senegal – Aïssata Tall Sall (2020–present)
- Seychelles – Sylvestre Radegonde (2020–2025)
- Sierra Leone – David J. Francis (2021–2023)
- Somalia – Abdisaid Muse Ali (2021–2022)
- Somaliland – Essa Kayd (2020–present)
- South Africa – Naledi Pandor (2019–present)
- South Sudan – Mayiik Ayii Deng (2021–2023)
- Sudan –
  1. Abdalla Omar Bashir (acting) (2021–2022)
  2. Ali Sadiq Ali (acting) (2022–present)
- Swaziland – Thuli Dladla (2018–present)
- Tanzania – Liberata Mulamula (2021–2022)
- Togo – Robert Dussey (2013–present)
- Tunisia – Othman Jerandi (2020–2023)
- Uganda – Jeje Odongo (2021–present)
- Zambia – Stanley Kakubo (2021–2023)
- Zimbabwe – Frederick Shava (2021–present)

== Asia ==
- Abkhazia – Inal Ardzinba (2021–present)
- Afghanistan – Amir Khan Muttaqi (acting) (2021–present)
- Armenia – Ararat Mirzoyan (2021–present)
- Artsakh – David Babayan (2021–2023)
- Azerbaijan – Jeyhun Bayramov (2020–present)
- Bahrain – Abdullatif bin Rashid Al Zayani (2020–present)
- Bangladesh – AK Abdul Momen (2019–2024)
- Bhutan – Tandi Dorji (2018–present)
- Brunei – Hassanal Bolkiah (2015–present)
- Cambodia – Prak Sokhonn (2016–2023)
- China (People's Republic of China) –
  1. Wang Yi (2013–2022)
  2. Qin Gang (2022–2023)
- East Timor – Adaljiza Magno (2020–2023)
- Georgia –
1. David Zalkaliani (2018–2022)
2. Ilia Darchiashvili (2022–present)
- India – Subrahmanyam Jaishankar (2019–present)
- Indonesia – Retno Marsudi (2014–present)
- Iran – Hossein Amir-Abdollahian (2021–present)
- Iraq – Fuad Hussein (2020–present)
  - Kurdistan – Safeen Dizayee (2019–present)
- Israel – Eli Cohen (2022–2024)
- Japan – Yoshimasa Hayashi (2021–2023)
- Jordan – Ayman Safadi (2017–present)
- Kazakhstan – Mukhtar Tleuberdi (2019–2023)
- North Korea (Democratic People's Republic of Korea) –
  1. Ri Son-gwon (2020–2022)
  2. Choe Son-hui (2022-present)
- South Korea (Republic of Korea) –
  1. Chung Eui-yong (2021–2022)
  2. Park Jin (2022–2024)
- Kuwait –
  1. Sheikh Ahmad Nasser Al-Mohammad Al-Sabah (2019–2022)
  2. Sheikh Salem Abdullah Al-Jaber Al-Sabah (2022–present)
- Kyrgyzstan –
1. Ruslan Kazakbayev (2020–2022)
2. Jeenbek Kulubaev (2022–present)
- Laos – Saleumxay Kommasith (2016–present)
- Lebanon – Abdallah Bou Habib (2021–present)
- Malaysia –
  1. Saifuddin Abdullah (2021–2022)
  2. Zambry Abdul Kadir (2022–2023)
- Maldives – Abdulla Shahid (2018–2023)
- Mongolia – Battsetseg Batmunkh (2021–present)
- Myanmar
  - Myanmar – Wunna Maung Lwin (2021–2023)
  - National Unity Government of Myanmar (body claiming to be the legitimate government of Myanmar (Burma), existing in parallel with State Administration Council military junta) – Zin Mar Aung (2021–present)
- Nepal – Narayan Khadka (2021–2022)
- Oman – Badr bin Hamad Al Busaidi (2020–present)
- Pakistan –
1. Shah Mahmood Qureshi (2018–2022)
2. Bilawal Bhutto Zardari (2022–2023)
- Palestine – Riyad al-Maliki (2007–present)
- Philippines –
  1. Teodoro Locsin Jr. (2018–2022)
  2. Enrique Manalo (2022–2025)
- Qatar – Mohammed bin Abdulrahman bin Jassim Al Thani (2016–present)
- Saudi Arabia – Prince Faisal bin Farhan Al Saud (2019–present)
- Singapore – Vivian Balakrishnan (2015–present)
- South Ossetia – Dmitry Medoyev (2017–2022)
- Sri Lanka –
1. Prof. Gamini Lakshman Peiris (2021–2022)
2. Ali Sabry (2022–present)
- Syria (Syrian Arab Republic) – Faisal Mekdad (2020–present)
- Taiwan (Republic of China) – Joseph Wu (2018–present)
- Tajikistan – Sirodjidin Aslov (2013–present)
- Thailand – Don Pramudwinai (2015–2023)
- Turkey – Mevlüt Çavuşoğlu (2015–2023)
- Turkmenistan – Raşit Meredow (2001–present)
- United Arab Emirates – Sheikh Abdullah bin Zayed Al Nahyan (2006–present)
- Uzbekistan –
1. Abdulaziz Kamilov (2012–2022)
2. Vladimir Norov (acting) (2022-present)
- Vietnam – Bùi Thanh Sơn (2021–present)
- Yemen
  - Republic of Yemen – Ahmad Awad bin Mubarak (2020–present)
  - Supreme Political Council (unrecognised, rival government) – Hisham Abdullah (2016–present)

== Europe ==
- Albania – Olta Xhaçka (2020–2023)
- Andorra – Maria Ubach i Font (2017–2023)
- Austria – Alexander Schallenberg (2021–present)
- Belarus
  - Belarus –
  1. Vladimir Makei (2012–2022)
  2. Sergei Aleinik (2022–2024)
  - National Anti-Crisis Management ("Shadow-government-like" organisation) – Anatoly Kotov (2020–present)
- Belgium –
  1. Sophie Wilmès (2020–2022)
  2. Hadja Lahbib (2022–present)
  - Brussels – Pascal Smet (2019–present)
  - Flanders – Jan Jambon (2019–present)
  - Wallonia – Elio Di Rupo (2019–present)
- Bosnia and Herzegovina – Bisera Turković (2019–2023)
- Bulgaria –
  1. Teodora Genchovska (2021–2022)
  2. Nikolay Milkov (2022–2023)
- Croatia – Gordan Grlić-Radman (2019–present)
- Cyprus –
  1. Nikos Christodoulides (2018–2022)
  2. Ioannis Kasoulidis (2022–2023)
- Czech Republic – Jan Lipavský (2021–present)
- Denmark – Jeppe Kofod (2019–2022)
  - Faroe Islands – Jenis av Rana (2019–2022)
- Estonia –
1. Eva-Maria Liimets (2021–2022)
2. Andres Sutt (2022) (acting)
3. Urmas Reinsalu (2022–2023)
- Finland – Pekka Haavisto (2019–2023)
- France –
  1. Jean-Yves Le Drian (2017–2022)
  2. Catherine Colonna (2022–2024)
- Germany – Annalena Baerbock (2021–present)
- Greece – Nikos Dendias (2019–2023)
- Guernsey – Jonathan Le Tocq (2016–present)
- Hungary – Péter Szijjártó (2014–present)
- Iceland – Þórdís Kolbrún R. Gylfadóttir (2021–2023)
- Ireland – Simon Coveney (2017–2022)
- Italy – Luigi Di Maio (2019–2022)
  1. Antonio Tajani (2022–present)
- Jersey – Ian Gorst (2018–2022)
- Kosovo – Donika Gërvalla-Schwarz (2021–present)
- Latvia – Edgars Rinkēvičs (2011–2023)
- Liechtenstein – Dominique Hasler (2021–present)
- Lithuania – Gabrielius Landsbergis (2020–present)
- Lugansk People's Republic – Vladislav Deinevo (2017–present)
- Luxembourg – Jean Asselborn (2004–2023)
- Malta –
1. Evarist Bartolo (2020–2022)
2. Ian Borg (2022–present)
- Moldova – Nicu Popescu (2021–2024)
  - Gagauzia – Vitaliy Vlah (2015–present)
- Monaco –
  1. Laurent Anselmi (2019–2022)
  2. Isabelle Berro-Amadeï (2022–present)
- Montenegro –
1. Đorđe Radulović (2020–2022)
2. Ranko Krivokapić (2022)
3. Dritan Abazović (2022–2023)
- Netherlands –
  1. Ben Knapen (2021–2022)
  2. Wopke Hoekstra (2022–2023)
- North Macedonia – Bujar Osmani (2020–present)
- Northern Cyprus –
  1. Tahsin Ertuğruloğlu (2020–2022)
  2. Hasan Taçoy (2022)
  3. Tahsin Ertuğruloğlu (2022–present)
- Norway –
  1. Anniken Huitfeldt (2021–2023)
  2. Espen Barth Eide (2023–present)
- Poland – Zbigniew Rau (2020–2023)
- Portugal –
  1. Augusto Santos Silva (2015–2022)
  2. António Costa (2022)
  3. João Gomes Cravinho (2022–present)
- Romania – Bogdan Aurescu (2019–2023)
- Russia – Sergey Lavrov (2004–present)
- San Marino – Luca Beccari (2020–present)
- Serbia – Nikola Selaković (2020–2022)
- Slovakia – Ivan Korčok (2021–present)
- Slovenia –
1. Anže Logar (2020–2022)
2. Tanja Fajon (2022–present)
- Spain – José Manuel Albares (2021–present)
  - Catalonia – Victòria Alsina Burgués (2021–present)
- Sweden –
  1. Ann Linde (2019–2022)
  2. Tobias Billström (2022–present)
- Switzerland – Ignazio Cassis (2017–present)
- Transnistria – Vitaly Ignatiev (2015–present)
- Ukraine – Dmytro Kuleba (2020–present)
- United Kingdom – James Cleverly (2022–2023)
  - Scotland – Angus Robertson (2021–present)
- Vatican City – Archbishop Paul Gallagher (2014–present)

== North America and the Caribbean ==
- Antigua and Barbuda – E.P. Chet Greene (2018–present)
- The Bahamas – Fred Mitchell (2021–present)
- Barbados – Jerome Walcott (2018–present)
- Belize – Eamon Courtenay (2020–present)
- Canada – Mélanie Joly (2021–2025)
  - Quebec –
  1. Nadine Girault (2018–2022)
  2. Martine Biron (2022–present)
- Costa Rica –
  1. Rodolfo Solano (2020–2022)
  2. Arnoldo André Tinoco (2022–present)
- Cuba – Bruno Rodríguez Parrilla (2009–present)
- Dominica – Kenneth Darroux (2019–present)
- Dominican Republic – Roberto Álvarez Gil (2020–present)
- El Salvador – Alexandra Hill Tinoco (2019–present)
- Greenland – Múte Bourup Egede (2021–present)
- Grenada –
  1. Oliver Joseph (2020–2022)
  2. Joseph Andall (2022–present)
- Guatemala –
  1. Pedro Brolo (2020–2022)
  2. Mario Búcaro (2022–2024)
- Haiti – Jean Victor Généus (2021–present)
- Honduras –
  1. Lisandro Rosales (2019–2022)
  2. Eduardo Enrique Reina (2022–present)
- Jamaica – Kamina Johnson-Smith (2016–present)
- Mexico – Marcelo Ebrard (2018–2023)
- Nicaragua – Denis Moncada (2017–present)
- Panama –
  1. Erika Mouynes (2020–2022)
  2. Janaina Tewaney (2022–present)
- Puerto Rico – Omar J. Marrero (2021–present)
- Saint Kitts and Nevis –
  1. Mark Brantley (2015–2022)
  2. Vincent Byron (2022)
  3. Denzil Douglas (2022–present)
- Saint Lucia – Alva Baptiste (2021–present)
- Saint Vincent and the Grenadines – Ralph Gonsalves (2020–2022)
- Trinidad and Tobago – Amery Browne (2020–present)
- United States – Antony Blinken (2021–2025)

== Oceania ==
- Australia –
  1. Marise Payne (2018–2022)
  2. Penny Wong (2022–present)
- Cook Islands – Mark Brown (2013–present)
- Fiji –
  1. Frank Bainimarama (2020–2022)
  2. Sitiveni Rabuka (2022–present)
- French Polynesia – Édouard Fritch (2014–2023)
- Kiribati – Taneti Mamau (2016–present)
- Marshall Islands – Casten Nemra (2020–present)
- Micronesia – Kandhi A. Elieisar (2019–present)
- Nauru –
  1. Lionel Aingimea (2019–2022)
  2. Russ Kun (2022–2023)
- New Zealand – Nanaia Mahuta (2020–2023)
- Niue – Dalton Tagelagi (2020–present)
- Palau – Gustav Aitaro (2021–present)
- Papua New Guinea –
  1. Soroi Eoe (2020–2022)
  2. Justin Tkatchenko (2022–2023)
- Samoa – Fiamē Naomi Mataʻafa (2021–present)
- Solomon Islands – Jeremiah Manele (2019–present)
- Tokelau – Kelihiano Kalolo (2021–present)
- Tonga – Fekitamoeloa ʻUtoikamanu (2021–present)
- Tuvalu – Simon Kofe (2019–2023)
- Vanuatu –
  1. Mark Ati (2020–2022)
  2. Jotham Napat (2022–2023)

== South America ==
- Argentina – Santiago Cafiero (2021–2023)
- Bolivia – Rogelio Mayta (2020–2023)
- Brazil – Mauro Luiz Iecker Vieira (2022–present)
- Chile –
  1. Andrés Allamand (2020–2022)
  2. Carolina Valdivia (acting) (2022)
  3. Antonia Urrejola (2022–2023)
- Colombia –
  1. Marta Lucía Ramírez (2021–2022)
  2. Álvaro Leyva (2022–present)
- Ecuador –
  1. Mauricio Montalvo Samaniego (2021–2022)
  2. Juan Carlos Holguín (2022–2023)
- Guyana – Hugh Todd (2020–present)
- Paraguay –
  1. Euclides Acevedo (2021–2022)
  2. Julio Arriola (2022–2023)
- Peru –
  1. Óscar Maúrtua (2021–2022)
  2. César Landa (2022)
  3. Miguel Ángel Rodríguez Mackay (2022)
  4. César Landa (2022)
  5. Ana Gervasi (2022–2023)
- Suriname – Albert Ramdin (2020–present)
- Uruguay – Francisco Bustillo (2020–2023)
- Venezuela – Félix Plasencia (2021–present)

== See also ==
- List of current foreign ministers
