= List of female foreign ministers =

A foreign minister or minister of foreign affairs (sometimes external affairs minister) is generally a cabinet minister in charge of a nation's foreign policy and relations. There have been many women appointed to this post around the world. This list shows female foreign ministers from around the world, either from sovereign states, unrecognized states, autonomous regions, or sui generis entities. Some countries have varied titles for this particular position, such as minister for external affairs in Brazil and India. In the United States and the United Kingdom, the position is titled as Secretary of State and Secretary of State for Foreign and Commonwealth Affairs respectively.

In some cases, the prime minister has concurrently served as foreign minister. This was the case with Indira Gandhi and Sirimavo Bandaranaike, who served as prime ministers of India and Ceylon respectively. Sweden has had nine female ministers, a world record.

== Sovereign states ==
Denotes incumbent foreign minister
- Italics denotes an acting foreign minister and states that are defunct.

Name	Image	Country	Region	Mandate start	Mandate end	Term length
Ana Pauker		Romania	Europe	30 December 1947	9 July 1952	4 years, 192 days
Golda Meir		Israel	Asia	18 June 1956	12 January 1966	9 years, 208 days
Tahira Tahirova		Azerbaijan SSR	Asia	26 March 1959	24 November 1983	24 years, 212 days
Sirimavo Bandaranaike (Note: Served concurrently as prime minister.)		Ceylon (Note: Ceylon changed its name into Sri Lanka in 1977.)	Asia	21 July 1960	27 March 1965	4 years, 249 days
Sirimavo Bandaranaike		Ceylon/Sri Lanka	Asia	29 May 1970	23 July 1977	7 years, 55 days
Indira Gandhi (Note: Served concurrently as prime minister)		India	Asia	6 September 1967	13 February 1969	1 year, 160 days
Indira Gandhi		India	Asia	19 July 1984	31 October 1984	104 days
Princess Elizabeth of Toro		Uganda	Africa	February 1974	November 1974	273 days
Licelott Marte de Barrios		Dominican Republic	Americas	1975	1975	?
Karin Söder		Sweden	Europe	8 October 1976	18 October 1978	2 years, 10 days
Maria do Nascimento da Graça Amorim		São Tomé and Príncipe	Africa	1978	1985	7 years, 0 days
Flora MacDonald		Canada	Americas	4 June 1979	2 March 1980	272 days
Gloria Amon Nikoi		Ghana	Africa	26 June 1979	24 September 1979	90 days
Eugenia Charles (Note: Served concurrently as prime minister.)		Dominica	Americas	21 July 1980	1990	9 years, 164 days
Colette Flesch		Luxembourg	Europe	22 November 1980	20 July 1984	3 years, 241 days
Gaositwe Chiepe		Botswana	Africa	1984	1994	10 years, 0 days
Adrienne Liyonda		Zaire (Note: Zaire changed its name into Democratic Republic of the Congo in 1997.)	Africa	1987	1988	1 year, 0 days
Danielle de St. Jorre		Seychelles	Africa	1989	25 February 1997	8 years, 55 days
Akmaral Arystanbekova		Kazakhstan	Asia	1989	1991	2 years, 0 days
Susana Ruiz Cerutti		Argentina	Americas	26 May 1989	8 July 1989	43 days
Pascaline Bongo Ondimba		Gabon	Africa	1991	1994	3 years, 0 days
Shahlo Mahmudova		Uzbekistan	Asia	1991	1992	1 year, 0 days
Marie-Denise Fabien-Jean-Louis		Haiti	Americas	19 February 1991	19 September 1991	240 days
Barbara McDougall		Canada	Americas	21 April 1991	24 June 1993	2 years, 64 days
Margaretha af Ugglas		Sweden	Europe	4 October 1991	7 October 1994	3 years, 3 days
Noemí Sanín		Colombia	Americas	8 November 1991	7 August 1994	2 years, 272 days
Roza Otunbayeva		Kyrgyzstan	Asia	26 February 1992	10 October 1992	227 days
Roza Otunbayeva		Kyrgyzstan	Asia	1994	1 July 1997	3 years, 0 days
Roza Otunbayeva		Kyrgyzstan	Asia	25 March 2005	30 September 2005	189 days
Andrea Willi		Liechtenstein	Europe	1993	5 April 2001	8 years, 94 days
Motarilavoa Hilda Lin̄i		Vanuatu	Oceania	1993	1993	?
Claudette Werleigh		Haiti	Americas	1 September 1993	16 May 1994	257 days
Claudette Werleigh		Haiti	Americas	8 November 1994	7 November 1995	364 days
Billie Miller		Barbados	Americas	1994	19 January 2008	14 years, 18 days
Dorothy Musuleng-Cooper		Liberia	Africa	1994	1995	1 year, 0 days
Janet Bostwick		Bahamas	Americas	1994	3 May 2002	8 years, 122 days
Gladys Maritza Ruiz de Vielman		Guatemala	Americas	1994	1995	1 year, 0 days
Sy Kadiatou Sow		Mali	Africa	1994	1995	1 year, 0 days
Lena Hjelm-Wallén		Sweden	Europe	7 October 1994	7 October 1998	4 years, 0 days
Susanna Agnelli		Italy	Europe	17 January 1995	17 May 1996	1 year, 121 days
Tarja Halonen		Finland	Europe	13 April 1995	25 February 2000	4 years, 318 days
Tansu Çiller		Turkey	Europe	28 June 1996	30 June 1997	1 year, 2 days
María Emma Mejía Vélez		Colombia	Americas	10 July 1996	25 March 1998	1 year, 258 days
Irina Bokova		Bulgaria	Europe	13 November 1996	13 February 1997	92 days
Shirley Gbujama		Sierra Leone	Africa	21 November 1996	25 May 1997	185 days
Madeleine Albright		United States	Americas	23 January 1997	20 January 2001	3 years, 363 days
Nadezhda Neynsky (Note: Nadezhda Mihaylova until 2006, Neynsky since 2009.)		Bulgaria	Europe	21 May 1997	24 July 2001	4 years, 64 days
Nadezhda Neynsky		Bulgaria	Europe	19 February 2026	8 May 2026	78 days
Zdenka Kramplová		Slovakia	Europe	25 May 1997	30 October 1998	1 year, 158 days
Naira Melkumian		Artsakh	Europe	1997	11 October 2002	5 years, 283 days
Rosario Green		Mexico	Americas	1 January 1998	30 November 2000	2 years, 334 days
Lila Ratsifandrihamanana		Madagascar	Africa	31 July 1998	28 February 2002	3 years, 212 days
Anna Lindh		Sweden	Europe	7 October 1998	11 September 2003	4 years, 339 days
Nyam-Osoryn Tuyaa		Mongolia	Asia	9 December 1998	9 August 2000	1 year, 244 days
Hilia Barber		Guinea-Bissau	Africa	8 January 1999	7 May 1999	119 days
Aïchatou Mindaoudou		Niger	Africa	16 April 1999	5 January 2000	264 days
Aïchatou Mindaoudou		Niger	Africa	17 September 2001	21 April 2011	9 years, 216 days
María Eugenia Brizuela de Ávila		El Salvador	Americas	1 June 1999	1 June 2004	5 years, 0 days
Nkosazana Dlamini-Zuma		South Africa	Africa	14 June 1999	10 May 2009	9 years, 330 days
Lydie Polfer		Luxembourg	Europe	7 August 1999	31 July 2004	4 years, 359 days
Benita Ferrero-Waldner		Austria	Europe	4 February 2000	20 October 2004	4 years, 259 days
Lilian Patel		Malawi	Africa	1 March 2000	16 June 2004	4 years, 107 days
Soledad Alvear		Chile	Americas	11 March 2000	1 October 2004	4 years, 204 days
Mahawa Bangoura		Guinea	Africa	7 June 2000	10 June 2002	2 years, 3 days
Marie Levens		Suriname	Americas	12 August 2000	12 August 2005	5 years, 0 days
Antonieta Rosa Gomes		Guinea-Bissau	Africa	25 March 2001	21 November 2001	241 days
Makiko Tanaka		Japan	Asia	26 April 2001	26 January 2002	275 days
Ilinka Mitreva		FYR Macedonia	Europe	13 May 2001	23 November 2001	194 days
Ilinka Mitreva		FYR Macedonia	Europe	1 November 2002	28 August 2006	3 years, 298 days
Gloria Macapagal Arroyo (Note: Served concurrently as president.)		Philippines	Asia	15 July 2002	16 July 2002	1 day
Arta Dade		Albania	Europe	12 September 2001	31 July 2002	322 days
Filomena Mascarenhas Tipote		Guinea-Bissau	Africa	12 December 2001	17 November 2002	340 days
Kristiina Ojuland		Estonia	Europe	28 January 2002	8 February 2005	3 years, 11 days
Yoriko Kawaguchi		Japan	Asia	16 February 2002	27 September 2004	2 years, 224 days
Alda Bandeira		São Tomé and Príncipe	Africa	28 March 2002	7 October 2002	193 days
Ana Palacio		Spain	Europe	9 July 2002	17 April 2004	1 year, 283 days
Carolina Barco		Colombia	Americas	7 August 2002	7 August 2006	4 years, 0 days
Fátima Veiga		Cape Verde	Africa	19 October 2002	3 April 2004	1 year, 167 days
Sandra Kalniete		Latvia	Europe	7 November 2002	9 March 2004	1 year, 123 days
Micheline Calmy-Rey		Switzerland	Europe	1 January 2003	31 December 2011	8 years, 364 days
Nina Pacari		Ecuador	Americas	15 January 2003	6 August 2003	203 days
Fatumata Djau Baldé		Guinea-Bissau	Africa	4 July 2003	14 September 2003	72 days
Edna Adan Ismail		Somaliland	Africa	30 July 2003	30 July 2006	3 years, 0 days
Leila Rachid de Cowles		Paraguay	Americas	15 August 2003	21 August 2006	3 years, 6 days
Teresa Patrício de Gouveia		Portugal	Europe	9 October 2003	17 July 2004	282 days
Laila Freivalds		Sweden	Europe	10 October 2003	21 March 2006	2 years, 162 days
Delia Albert		Philippines	Asia	23 December 2003	18 August 2004	239 days
Salome Zurabishvili		Georgia	Europe	20 March 2004	19 October 2005	1 year, 213 days
Ursula Plassnik		Austria	Europe	20 October 2004	2 December 2008	4 years, 43 days
Helēna Demakova		Latvia	Europe	28 October 2004	29 November 2004	32 days
Helēna Demakova		Latvia	Europe	29 October 2007	8 November 2007	10 days
Condoleezza Rice		United States	Americas	26 January 2005	20 January 2009	3 years, 360 days
Alcinda Abreu		Mozambique	Africa	3 February 2005	10 March 2008	3 years, 36 days
Kolinda Grabar-Kitarović		Croatia	Europe	17 February 2005	12 January 2008	2 years, 329 days
Fatoumata Kaba		Guinea	Africa	8 March 2005	6 September 2006	1 year, 182 days
Rita Kieber-Beck		Liechtenstein	Europe	21 April 2005	25 March 2009	3 years, 338 days
Ana Trišić-Babić		Bosnia and Herzegovina	Europe	9 June 2005	15 June 2005	6 days
Lygia Kraag-Keteldijk		Suriname	Americas	12 August 2005	12 August 2010	5 years, 0 days
Antoinette Batumubwira		Burundi	Africa	30 August 2005	29 January 2009	3 years, 152 days
Rosemary Museminali		Rwanda	Africa	2 September 2005	4 December 2009	4 years, 93 days
Asha-Rose Migiro		Tanzania	Africa	6 January 2006	11 January 2007	1 year, 5 days
Tzipi Livni		Israel	Asia	18 January 2006	1 April 2009	3 years, 73 days
Dora Bakoyannis		Greece	Europe	15 February 2006	6 October 2009	3 years, 233 days
Carin Jämtin		Sweden	Europe	27 March 2006	24 April 2006	28 days
Mariam Aladji Boni Diallo		Benin	Africa	10 April 2006	17 June 2007	1 year, 68 days
Margaret Beckett		United Kingdom	Europe	5 May 2006	28 June 2007	1 year, 54 days
Anna Fotyga		Poland	Europe	9 May 2006	15 November 2007	1 year, 190 days
Joyce Banda		Malawi	Africa	1 June 2006	29 May 2009	2 years, 362 days
Kinga Göncz		Hungary	Europe	9 June 2006	14 April 2009	2 years, 309 days
Valgerður Sverrisdóttir		Iceland	Europe	15 June 2006	24 May 2007	343 days
Ngozi Okonjo-Iweala		Nigeria	Africa	21 June 2006	30 August 2006	70 days
María Consuelo Araújo		Colombia	Americas	7 August 2006	19 February 2007	196 days
Joy Ogwu		Nigeria	Africa	30 August 2006	29 May 2007	272 days
Patricia Espinosa		Mexico	Americas	1 December 2006	1 December 2012	6 years, 0 days
Maia Chigoyeva-Tsaboshvili		South Ossetia	Europe	2006	2007	?
María Fernanda Espinosa		Ecuador	Americas	15 January 2007	7 December 2007	326 days
María Fernanda Espinosa		Ecuador	Americas	24 May 2017	12 June 2018	1 year, 19 days
Sahana Pradhan		Nepal	Asia	1 April 2007	22 August 2008	1 year, 143 days
Maria da Conceição Nobre Cabral		Guinea-Bissau	Africa	18 April 2007	7 January 2009	1 year, 264 days
Meritxell Mateu Pi		Andorra	Europe	2 May 2007	9 June 2009	2 years, 38 days
Adaljiza Magno		East Timor	Asia	19 May 2007	8 August 2007	81 days
Adaljiza Magno		East Timor	Asia	24 June 2020	1 July 2023	3 years, 7 days
Ingibjörg Sólrún Gísladóttir		Iceland	Europe	24 May 2007	1 February 2009	1 year, 253 days
Lisa Shoman		Belize	Americas	4 June 2007	12 February 2008	253 days
Erato Kozakou-Marcoullis		Cyprus	Europe	16 July 2007	2 March 2008	230 days
Erato Kozakou-Marcoullis		Cyprus	Europe	5 August 2011	1 March 2013	1 year, 208 days
Olubanke King Akerele		Liberia	Africa	22 August 2007	3 November 2010	3 years, 73 days
Zainab Bangura		Sierra Leone	Africa	14 October 2007	3 December 2010	3 years, 50 days
Paula Gopee-Scoon		Trinidad and Tobago	Americas	7 November 2007	28 May 2010	2 years, 202 days
Sanjaasürengiin Oyuun		Mongolia	Asia	4 December 2007	20 September 2008	291 days
María Isabel Salvador		Ecuador	Americas	7 December 2007	12 December 2008	1 year, 5 days
Marisol Argueta de Barillas		El Salvador	Americas	16 January 2008	1 June 2009	1 year, 136 days
Carolyn Rodrigues		Guyana	Americas	10 April 2008	19 May 2015	7 years, 39 days
Laure Olga Gondjout		Gabon	Africa	28 April 2008	9 October 2008	164 days
Eka Tkeshelashvili		Georgia	Europe	5 May 2008	6 December 2008	215 days
Helen Clark		New Zealand	Oceania	29 August 2008	19 November 2008	82 days
Maxine McClean		Barbados	Americas	24 November 2008	27 May 2018	9 years, 184 days
Antonella Mularoni		San Marino	Europe	4 December 2008	5 December 2012	4 years, 1 day
Dipu Moni		Bangladesh	Asia	6 January 2009	20 November 2013	4 years, 318 days
Adiato Djaló Nandigna		Guinea-Bissau	Africa	7 January 2009	28 October 2009	294 days
Hillary Clinton		United States	Americas	21 January 2009	1 February 2013	4 years, 11 days
Patricia Isabel Rodas		Honduras	Americas	31 January 2009	28 June 2009	148 days
Sandra Pierantozzi		Palau	Oceania	6 February 2009	19 March 2010	1 year, 41 days
Aurelia Frick		Liechtenstein	Europe	25 March 2009	2 July 2019	10 years, 99 days
Maite Nkoana-Mashabane		South Africa	Africa	10 May 2009	27 February 2018	8 years, 293 days
Sujata Koirala		Nepal	Asia	25 May 2009	6 February 2011	1 year, 257 days
Etta Banda		Malawi	Africa	17 June 2009	19 August 2011	2 years, 63 days
Rumiana Jeleva		Bulgaria	Europe	27 July 2009	27 January 2010	184 days
Naha Mint Mouknass		Mauritania	Africa	5 August 2009	22 March 2011	1 year, 229 days
Marie-Michèle Rey		Haiti	Americas	8 November 2009	24 October 2011	2 years, 296 days
Louise Mushikiwabo		Rwanda	Africa	4 December 2009	19 October 2018	8 years, 319 days
Rasa Juknevičienė		Lithuania	Europe	26 January 2010	11 February 2010	16 days
Lene Espersen		Denmark	Europe	23 February 2010	3 October 2011	1 year, 222 days
Aminatou Maïga Touré		Niger	Africa	1 March 2010	21 April 2011	1 year, 51 days
María Ángela Holguín		Colombia	Americas	7 August 2010	7 August 2018	8 years, 0 days
Vlora Çitaku		Kosovo	Europe	18 October 2010	22 February 2011	127 days
Trinidad Jiménez		Spain	Europe	20 October 2010	22 December 2011	1 year, 63 days
Michèle Alliot-Marie		France	Europe	14 November 2010	27 February 2011	105 days
Hina Rabbani Khar		Pakistan	Asia	11 February 2011	16 March 2013	2 years, 33 days
Yvette Sylla		Madagascar	Africa	26 March 2011	21 November 2011	240 days
Vesna Pusic		Croatia	Europe	23 December 2011	22 January 2016	4 years, 30 days
Nina Shtanski		Transnistria	Europe	18 January 2012	14 September 2015	3 years, 239 days
Maia Panjikidze		Georgia	Europe	25 October 2012	5 November 2014	2 years, 11 days
Susan Waffa-Ogoo		The Gambia	Africa	1 November 2012	31 October 2013	364 days
Fowsiyo Yussuf Haji Aadan		Somalia	Africa	4 November 2012	17 January 2014	1 year, 74 days
Netumbo Nandi-Ndaitwah		Namibia	Africa	4 December 2012	4 February 2024	11 years, 62 days
Natália Pedro da Costa Umbelina Neto		São Tomé and Príncipe	Africa	12 December 2012	25 December 2014	2 years, 13 days
Hanna Tetteh		Ghana	Africa	30 January 2013	7 January 2017	3 years, 343 days
Emma Bonino		Italy	Europe	28 April 2013	22 February 2014	300 days
Mireya Agüero		Honduras	Americas	2 May 2013	8 January 2015	1 year, 251 days
Mireya Agüero		Honduras	Americas	27 January 2026	Incumbent	270 days
Eda Rivas		Peru	Americas	15 May 2013	23 June 2014	1 year, 39 days
Amina Mohamed		Kenya	Africa	19 May 2013	16 February 2018	4 years, 273 days
Natalia Gherman		Moldova	Europe	30 May 2013	20 January 2016	2 years, 235 days
Léonie Banga-Bothy		Central African Republic	Africa	13 June 2013	27 January 2014	228 days
Mariyam Shakeela		Maldives	Asia	12 September 2013	17 November 2013	66 days
Viola Onwuliri		Nigeria	Africa	13 September 2013	5 March 2014	173 days
Julie Bishop		Australia	Oceania	18 September 2013	26 August 2018	4 years, 342 days
Dunya Maumoon		Maldives	Asia	17 November 2013	5 July 2016	2 years, 231 days
Sheikh Hasina (Note: Served concurrently as prime minister.)		Bangladesh	Asia	5 January 2014	26 February 2014	52 days
Federica Mogherini		Italy	Europe	22 February 2014	31 October 2014	251 days
Arisoa Razafitrimo		Madagascar	Africa	18 April 2014	25 January 2015	282 days
Sushma Swaraj		India	Asia	26 May 2014	31 May 2019	5 years, 5 days
Isabel Saint Malo		Panama	Americas	1 July 2014	1 July 2019	5 years, 0 days
Margot Wallström		Sweden	Europe	3 October 2014	10 December 2019	5 years, 68 days
Retno Marsudi		Indonesia	Asia	27 October 2014	20 October 2014	9 years, 359 days
Pelonomi Venson-Moitoi		Botswana	Africa	31 October 2014	4 April 2018	3 years, 155 days
Anne Sulling		Estonia	Europe	3 November 2014	17 November 2014	14 days
Tamar Beruchashvili		Georgia	Europe	11 November 2014	1 September 2015	294 days
Keit Pentus-Rosimannus		Estonia	Europe	17 November 2014	1 July 2015	226 days
Clarice Modeste-Curwen		Grenada	Americas	1 December 2014	1 July 2016	1 year, 213 days
Francine Baron		Dominica	Americas	13 December 2014	25 December 2019	5 years, 12 days
Delcy Rodríguez		Venezuela	Americas	26 December 2014	21 June 2017	2 years, 177 days
Neneh MacDouall-Gaye		The Gambia	Africa	6 January 2015	17 January 2017	2 years, 11 days
Béatrice Atallah		Madagascar	Africa	25 January 2015	25 August 2017	2 years, 212 days
Vatma Vall Mint Soueina		Mauritania	Africa	25 January 2015	2 September 2015	220 days
Aïchatou Kané Boulama		Niger	Africa	25 February 2015	11 April 2016	1 year, 46 days
Ana María Sánchez		Peru	Americas	2 April 2015	28 July 2016	1 year, 117 days
Marina Kaljurand		Estonia	Europe	16 July 2015	12 September 2016	1 year, 58 days
Emine Çolak		Northern Cyprus	Europe	16 July 2015	16 April 2016	275 days
Niermala Badrising		Suriname	Americas	12 August 2015	1 February 2017	1 year, 173 days
Claudia Ruiz Massieu		Mexico	Americas	27 August 2015	4 January 2017	1 year, 130 days
Susana Malcorra		Argentina	Americas	10 December 2015	29 May 2017	1 year, 170 days
Makalé Camara		Guinea	Africa	4 January 2016	22 August 2017	1 year, 230 days
Marjon Kamara		Liberia	Africa	6 January 2016	22 January 2018	2 years, 16 days
Kamina Johnson Smith		Jamaica	Americas	7 March 2016	Incumbent	10 years, 231 days
Aung San Suu Kyi (Note: Served concurrently as State Counsellor.)		Myanmar	Asia	30 March 2016	1 February 2021	4 years, 308 days
Lilja Dögg Alfreðsdóttir		Iceland	Europe	7 April 2016	11 January 2017	279 days
'Mamphono Khaketla		Lesotho	Africa	8 November 2016	16 June 2017	220 days
Chrystia Freeland		Canada	Americas	10 January 2017	20 November 2019	2 years, 314 days
Shirley Ayorkor Botchwey		Ghana	Africa	28 January 2017	7 January 2025	7 years, 345 days
Yldiz Pollack-Beighle		Suriname	Americas	1 February 2017	16 July 2020	3 years, 166 days
María Dolores Agüero		Honduras	Americas	27 March 2017	23 July 2019	2 years, 118 days
Ekaterina Zaharieva		Bulgaria	Europe	4 May 2017	12 May 2021	4 years, 8 days
Faustina Rehuher-Marugg		Palau	Oceania	13 June 2017	21 January 2021	3 years, 222 days
Kang Kyung-wha		South Korea	Asia	18 June 2017	8 February 2021	3 years, 235 days
Marija Pejčinović Burić		Croatia	Europe	19 June 2017	19 July 2019	2 years, 30 days
Maria Ubach i Font		Andorra	Europe	17 July 2017	15 May 2023	5 years, 304 days
Sandra Jovel		Guatemala	Americas	27 August 2017	14 January 2020	2 years, 140 days
Ine Eriksen Søreide		Norway	Europe	20 October 2017	14 October 2021	3 years, 359 days
Karin Kneissl		Austria	Europe	18 December 2017	3 June 2019	1 year, 167 days
Cayetana Aljovín		Peru	Americas	9 January 2018	2 April 2018	8 years, 288 days
Sigrid Kaag		Netherlands	Europe	13 February 2018	7 March 2018	22 days
Sigrid Kaag		Netherlands	Europe	25 May 2021	16 September 2021	114 days
Monica Juma		Kenya	Africa	16 February 2018	14 January 2020	1 year, 332 days
Lindiwe Sisulu		South Africa	Africa	27 February 2018	29 May 2019	1 year, 91 days
Tehmina Janjua		Pakistan	Asia	26 April 2018	5 June 2018	40 days
Epsy Campbell Barr		Costa Rica	Americas	8 May 2018	11 December 2018	217 days
Unity Dow		Botswana	Africa	20 June 2018	26 August 2020	2 years, 67 days
Marise Payne		Australia	Oceania	28 August 2018	23 May 2022	3 years, 268 days
Kamissa Camara		Mali	Africa	9 September 2018	18 April 2019	221 days
Thuli Dladla		Eswatini	Africa	2 November 2018	12 November 2023	5 years, 10 days
Elsa Teixeira Pinto		São Tomé and Príncipe	Africa	3 December 2018	19 September 2020	1 year, 291 days
Lorena Aguilar Revelo (acting)		Costa Rica	Americas	11 December 2018	8 January 2019	28 days
Sylvie Baïpo-Temon		Central African Republic	Africa	14 December 2018	Incumbent	7 years, 314 days
Karen Cummings		Guyana	Americas	2 May 2019	2 August 2020	1 year, 92 days
Nabeela Tunis		Sierra Leone	Africa	9 May 2019	30 April 2021	1 year, 356 days
Naledi Pandor		South Africa	Africa	29 May 2019	30 June 2024	5 years, 32 days
Alexandra Hill Tinoco		El Salvador	Americas	1 June 2019	Incumbent	7 years, 145 days
Suzi Barbosa		Guinea-Bissau	Africa	3 July 2019	24 January 2020	205 days
Ramona Mănescu		Romania	Europe	24 July 2019	4 November 2019	103 days
Awut Deng Acuil		South Sudan	Africa	19 August 2019	12 March 2020	206 days
Asma Mohamed Abdalla		Sudan	Africa	8 September 2019	9 July 2020	305 days
Marie Tumba Nzeza		Democratic Republic of the Congo	Africa	9 September 2019	12 April 2021	1 year, 215 days
Ann Linde		Sweden	Europe	10 September 2019	17 October 2022	3 years, 37 days
Katrin Eggenberger		Liechtenstein	Europe	11 November 2019	25 March 2021	1 year, 134 days
Karen Longaric		Bolivia	Americas	13 November 2019	9 November 2020	362 days
Claudia Blum		Colombia	Americas	27 November 2019	9 May 2021	1 year, 163 days
Margarita Robles		Spain	Europe	30 November 2019	13 January 2020	44 days
Bisera Turković		Bosnia and Herzegovina	Europe	23 December 2019	25 January 2023	3 years, 33 days
Arancha González Laya		Spain	Europe	13 January 2020	12 July 2021	1 year, 180 days
Raychelle Omamo		Kenya	Africa	14 January 2020	27 October 2022	2 years, 286 days
Verónica Macamo		Mozambique	Africa	17 January 2020	15 January 2025	4 years, 364 days
Ruth Monteiro		Guinea-Bissau	Africa	4 February 2020	2 March 2020	27 days
Suzi Barbosa		Guinea-Bissau	Africa	2 March 2020	13 August 2023	3 years, 164 days
Beatrice Wani-Noah		South Sudan	Africa	12 March 2020	9 September 2021	1 year, 181 days
'Matšepo Ramakoae		Lesotho	Africa	21 May 2020	27 October 2022	2 years, 159 days
Meliza Haradinaj-Stublla		Kosovo	Europe	3 June 2020	9 March 2021	279 days
Edite Tenjua		São Tomé and Príncipe	Africa	19 September 2020	14 November 2022	2 years, 56 days
Sophie Wilmès		Belgium	Europe	1 October 2020	14 July 2022	1 year, 286 days
Aïssata Tall Sall		Senegal	Africa	1 November 2020	Incumbent	5 years, 357 days
Nanaia Mahuta		New Zealand	Oceania	6 November 2020	11 November 2023	3 years, 5 days
Elizabeth Astete		Peru	Americas	18 November 2020	15 February 2021	89 days
Olta Xhaçka		Albania	Europe	4 January 2021	12 September 2023	2 years, 251 days
Uduch Sengebau Senior		Palau	Oceania	21 January 2021	16 January 2025	3 years, 361 days
Eva-Maria Liimets		Estonia	Europe	26 January 2021	3 June 2022	1 year, 128 days
Battsetseg Batmunkh		Mongolia	Asia	29 January 2021	Incumbent	5 years, 268 days
Mariam al-Mahdi		Sudan	Africa	11 February 2021	22 November 2021	284 days
Najla Mangoush		Libya	Africa	15 March 2021	Incumbent; Suspended 28 August 2023	5 years, 223 days 2 years, 166 days
Donika Gërvalla-Schwarz		Kosovo	Europe	22 March 2021	Incumbent	5 years, 216 days
Dominique Hasler		Liechtenstein	Europe	25 March 2021	10 April 2025	4 years, 16 days
Liberata Mulamula		Tanzania	Africa	31 March 2021	3 October 2022	1 year, 186 days
Kandia Camara		Ivory Coast	Africa	6 April 2021	Incumbent	5 years, 201 days
Marta Lucía Ramírez		Colombia	Americas	19 May 2021	7 August 2022	1 year, 80 days
Fiamē Naomi Mataʻafa		Samoa	Oceania	24 May 2021	16 September 2025	4 years, 115 days
Liz Truss		United Kingdom	Europe	15 September 2021	6 September 2022	356 days
Anniken Huitfeldt		Norway	Europe	14 October 2021	16 October 2023	2 years, 2 days
Mélanie Joly		Canada	Americas	26 October 2021	13 May 2025	3 years, 199 days
Þórdís Kolbrún R. Gylfadóttir		Iceland	Europe	28 November 2021	14 October 2023	1 year, 320 days
Þórdís Kolbrún R. Gylfadóttir		Iceland	Europe	9 April 2024	21 December 2024	256 days
Annalena Baerbock		Germany	Europe	8 December 2021	6 May 2025	3 years, 149 days
Teodora Genchovska		Bulgaria	Europe	13 December 2021	2 August 2022	232 days
Rosine Sori-Coulibaly		Burkina Faso	Africa	10 December 2021	24 January 2022	45 days
Fekitamoeloa ʻUtoikamanu		Tonga	Oceania	28 December 2021	Incumbent	4 years, 300 days
Isabelle Berro-Lefèvre		Monaco	Europe	17 January 2022	Incumbent	4 years, 280 days
Nancy Tembo		Malawi	Africa	27 January 2022	Incumbent	4 years, 270 days
Olivia Rouamba		Burkina Faso	Africa	5 March 2022	17 December 2023	1 year, 287 days
Antonia Urrejola		Chile	Americas	11 March 2022	10 March 2023	364 days
Jovana Marović		Montenegro	Europe	28 April 2022	25 November 2022	211 days
Catherine Colonna		France	Europe	20 May 2022	11 January 2024	1 year, 236 days
Penny Wong		Australia	Oceania	23 May 2022	Incumbent	4 years, 154 days
Tanja Fajon		Slovenia	Europe	1 June 2022	4 June 2026	4 years, 3 days
Choe Son-hui		North Korea	Asia	11 June 2022	Incumbent	4 years, 135 days
Hadja Lahbib		Belgium	Europe	15 July 2022	1 December 2024	2 years, 139 days
Stergomena Tax		Tanzania	Africa	3 October 2022	31 August 2023	332 days
Janaina Tewaney		Panama	North America	10 October 2022	1 July 2024	1 year, 265 days
Ana Gervasi		Peru	Americas	10 December 2022	6 November 2023	331 days
Bimala Rai Paudyal		Nepal	Asia	17 January 2023	27 February 2023	41 days
Imma Tor Faus		Andorra	Europe	17 May 2023	Incumbent	3 years, 160 days
Paulette Marcelline Adjovi		Benin	Africa	23 May 2023	6 June 2023	14 days
Mariya Gabriel		Bulgaria	Europe	6 June 2023	9 April 2024	308 days
Alicia Bárcena		Mexico	North America	12 June 2023	1 October 2024	1 year, 111 days
Luminița Odobescu		Romania	Europe	15 June 2023	23 December 2024	1 year, 191 days
Elina Valtonen		Finland	Europe	20 June 2023	Incumbent	3 years, 126 days
Liesje Schreinemacher		Netherlands	Europe	1 September 2023	5 September 2023	4 days
Hanke Bruins Slot		Netherlands	Europe	5 September 2023	2 July 2024	301 days
Yōko Kamikawa		Japan	Asia	13 September 2023	1 October 2024	1 year, 18 days
Pholile Shakantu		Eswatini	Africa	13 November 2023	Incumbent	2 years, 345 days
Celinda Sosa Lunda		Bolivia	Americas	15 November 2023	9 November 2025	1 year, 359 days
Gabriela Sommerfeld		Ecuador	Americas	23 November 2023	Incumbent	2 years, 335 days
Diana Mondino		Argentina	Americas	10 December 2023	30 October 2024	325 days
Rasata Rafaravavitafika		Madagascar	Africa	14 January 2024	28 October 2025	1 year, 287 days
Sara Beysolow Nyanti		Liberia	Africa	9 February 2024	Incumbent	2 years, 257 days
Yassine Fall		Senegal	Africa	7 April 2024	Incumbent	2 years, 200 days
Baiba Braže		Latvia	Europe	19 April 2024	Incumbent	2 years, 188 days
Thérèse Kayikwamba Wagner		DR Congo	Africa	13 June 2024	Incumbent	2 years, 133 days
Arzu Rana Deuba		Nepal	Asia	15 July 2024	9 September 2025	1 year, 56 days
Maria Malmer Stenergard		Sweden	Europe	10 September 2024	Incumbent	2 years, 44 days
Maka Bochorishvili		Georgia	Europe	28 November 2024	Incumbent	1 year, 330 days
Þorgerður Katrín Gunnarsdóttir		Iceland	Europe	21 December 2024	Incumbent	1 year, 307 days
Maria Manuela Lucas		Mozambique	Africa	17 January 2025	Incumbent	1 year, 280 days
Laura Sarabia		Colombia	Americas	29 January 2025	3 July 2025	155 days
Beate Meinl-Reisinger		Austria	Europe	3 March 2025	Incumbent	1 year, 235 days
Selma Ashipala-Musavyi		Namibia	Africa	21 March 2025	Incumbent	1 year, 217 days
Sabine Monauni		Liechtenstein	Europe	10 April 2025	Incumbent	1 year, 197 days
Anita Anand		Canada	Americas	13 May 2025	Incumbent	1 year, 164 days
Oana Țoiu		Romania	Europe	23 June 2025	20 October 2026	1 year, 119 days
Tess Lazaro		Philippines	Asia	1 July 2025	Incumbent	1 year, 115 days
Rosa Yolanda Villavicencio		Colombia	Americas	8 July 2025	Incumbent	1 year, 108 days
Yvette Cooper		United Kingdom	Europe	5 September 2025	20 July 2026	318 days
Elisa Spiropali		Albania	Europe	19 September 2025	26 February 2026	160 days
Christine Razanamahasoa		Madagascar	Africa	28 October 2025	25 March 2026	148 days
Helen McEntee		Ireland	Europe	18 November 2025	Incumbent	340 days
Alice N'Diaye		Madagascar	Africa	25 March 2026	Incumbent	213 days
Velislava Petrova-Chamova		Bulgaria	Europe	8 May 2026	Incumbent	169 days
Anita Orbán		Hungary	Europe	13 May 2026	Incumbent	164 days

== Autonomous and constituent regions ==
Denotes incumbent foreign minister
- Italics denotes an acting foreign minister and states that are defunct.

Name	Image	Country/Region	Continent	Mandate start	Mandate end	Term length
Nguyễn Thị Bình		South Vietnam (provisional government)	Asia	1969	1976	7 years, 0 days
Emily de Jongh-Elhage		Netherlands Antilles	North America	26 March 2006	10 October 2010	4 years, 198 days
Linda Fabiani		Scotland	Europe	17 May 2007	12 February 2009	1 year, 271 days
Aleqa Hammond		Greenland	North America	30 May 2007	26 September 2008	1 year, 119 days
Aleqa Hammond		Greenland	North America	5 April 2013	12 December 2014	1 year, 251 days
Fiona Hyslop		Scotland	Europe	1 December 2009	17 February 2020	10 years, 78 days
Christine St-Pierre		Quebec	North America	23 April 2014	18 October 2018	4 years, 178 days
Suka Frederiksen		Greenland	North America	24 April 2017	11 May 2018	1 year, 17 days
Vivian Motzfeldt		Greenland	North America	11 May 2018	5 October 2018	147 days
Ane Lone Bagger		Greenland	North America	5 October 2018	29 May 2020	1 year, 237 days
Nadine Girault		Quebec	North America	18 October 2018	20 October 2022	4 years, 2 days
Eluned Morgan		Wales	Europe	3 December 2018	8 October 2020	1 year, 310 days
Victòria Alsina		Catalonia	Europe	26 May 2021	10 October 2022	1 year, 137 days
Meritxell Serret		Catalonia	Europe	10 October 2022	12 August 2024	1 year, 307 days
Martine Biron		Quebec	North America	20 October 2022	10 September 2025	2 years, 325 days

== Sui generis entities ==
Denotes incumbent foreign minister

Name	Image	Entity	Continent	Mandate start	Mandate end	Term length
Benita Ferrero-Waldner		European Union	Europe	22 November 2004	1 December 2009	5 years, 9 days
Catherine Ashton		European Union	Europe	1 December 2009	1 November 2014	4 years, 335 days
Federica Mogherini		European Union	Europe	1 November 2014	30 November 2019	5 years, 29 days
Kaja Kallas		European Union	Europe	1 December 2024	Incumbent	1 year, 327 days

== See also ==
- Foreign minister
- List of current foreign ministers
- List of current permanent representatives to the United Nations
