= List of current foreign ministers =

This is a list of current foreign ministers of the 193 United Nations member states as well as the Holy See (Vatican City) and the State of Palestine.

Foreign ministers of sovereign countries with limited recognition, some alternative governments, some dependent territories and some autonomous administrative divisions are included in separate tables.

== Generally recognized sovereign states ==
State	List	Current foreign minister	Political affiliation	Assumed office
Afghanistan	List	Amir Khan Muttaqi	Taliban	7 September 2021
Albania	List	Ferit Hoxha	Independent	19 September 2025
Algeria	List	Ahmed Attaf	RND	6 March 2026
Andorra	List	Imma Tor Faus		17 May 2023
Angola	List	Tete António	MPLA	20 April 2020
Antigua and Barbuda	List	Paul Chet Greene	ABLP	21 March 2018
Argentina	List	Pablo Quirno	LLA	23 October 2025
Armenia	List	Ararat Mirzoyan	Civil Contract	19 August 2021
Australia	List	Penny Wong	Labor	23 May 2022
Austria	List	Beate Meinl-Reisinger	NEOS	3 March 2025
Azerbaijan	List	Jeyhun Bayramov	Independent	16 July 2020
The Bahamas	List	Fred Mitchell	PLP	20 September 2021
Bahrain	List	Abdullatif bin Rashid Al Zayani	—N/a (Note: The polity to which this foreign minister belongs has either banned political parties or does not have any.)	11 February 2020
Bangladesh	List	Khalilur Rahman		17 February 2026
Barbados	List	Christopher Sinckler	DLP	16 February 2026
Belarus	List	Maxim Ryzhenkov	Independent	27 June 2024
Belgium	List	Maxime Prévot	LE	3 February 2025
Belize	List	Francis Fonseca	PUP	1 January 2024
Benin	List	Corinne Amori Brunet		24 May 2026
Bhutan	List	D. N. Dhungyel	PDP	28 January 2024
Bolivia	List	Fernando Aramayo		9 November 2025
Bosnia and Herzegovina	List	Elmedin Konaković	NiP	25 January 2023
Botswana	List	Phenyo Butale	Independent	11 November 2024
Brazil	List	Mauro Vieira	Independent	1 January 2023
Brunei	List	Prince Abdul Mateen	—N/a	4 June 2026
Bulgaria	List	Velislava Petrova-Chamova	Independent	8 May 2026
Burkina Faso	List	Karamoko Jean-Marie Traoré	Independent	17 December 2023
Burundi	List	Édouard Bizimana	CNDD–FDD	5 August 2025
Cambodia	List	Prak Sokhonn	CPP	20 November 2024
Cameroon	List	Lejeune Mbella Mbella	RDPC	2 October 2015
Canada	List	Anita Anand	Liberal	13 May 2025
Cape Verde	List	José Luís Livramento	MpD	29 October 2025
Central African Republic	List	Sylvie Baïpo-Temon	Independent	14 December 2018
Chad	List	Abdoulaye Sabre Fadoul	MPS	14 October 2022
Chile	List	Francisco Pérez Mackenna	Independent	11 March 2026
China	List	Wang Yi	Communist	25 July 2023
Colombia	List	Omar Bula	Defenders of the Homeland	7 August 2026
Comoros	List	Mohamed Mbaé Chanfiou	Independent	9 July 2024
Congo, Democratic Republic of the	List	Thérèse Kayikwamba Wagner	Independent	13 June 2024
Congo, Republic of the	List	Constant-Serge Bounda	Independent	24 April 2026
Costa Rica	List	Ana Elena Pinto		15 October 2026
Croatia	List	Gordan Grlić-Radman	HDZ	19 July 2019
Cuba	List	Bruno Rodríguez Parrilla	PCC	2 March 2009
Cyprus	List	Constantinos Kombos	Independent	1 March 2023
Czech Republic	List	Petr Macinka	Motorists	15 December 2025
Denmark	List	Lars Løkke Rasmussen	Moderates	15 December 2022
Djibouti	List	Abdoulkader Houssein Omar	Independent	1 April 2025
Dominica	List	Vince Henderson	DLP	13 December 2022
Dominican Republic	List	Roberto Álvarez Gil	PRM	16 August 2020
Ecuador	List	Gabriela Sommerfeld	Independent	23 November 2023
Egypt	List	Badr Abdelatty	Independent	3 July 2024
El Salvador	List	Alexandra Hill Tinoco	Independent	1 June 2019
Equatorial Guinea	List	Simeón Oyono Esono Angüe	PDGE	6 February 2018
Eritrea	List	Osman Saleh Mohammed	PFDJ	18 April 2007
Estonia	List	Margus Tsahkna	E200	17 April 2023
Eswatini	List	Pholile Shakantu	Independent	13 November 2023
Ethiopia	List	Gedion Timothewos	Independent	18 October 2024
European Union	List	Kaja Kallas	RE	1 December 2024
Fiji	List	Sakiasi Ditoka	People's Alliance	19 January 2026
Finland	List	Elina Valtonen	National Coalition	20 June 2023
France	List	Jean-Noël Barrot	MoDem	21 September 2024
Gabon	List	Marie-Édith Tassyla-Ye-Doumbeneny	Independent	1 January 2026
The Gambia	List	Serign Modou Njie	Independent	14 July 2025
Georgia	List	Maka Bochorishvili	Georgian Dream	28 November 2024
Germany	List	Johann Wadephul	CDU	6 May 2025
Ghana	List	Samuel Okudzeto Ablakwa	NDC	7 February 2025
Greece	List	Giorgos Gerapetritis	ND	27 June 2023
Grenada	List	Joseph Andall	NDC	30 June 2022
Guatemala	List	Carlos Ramiro Martínez	Independent	15 January 2024
Guinea	List	Morissanda Kouyaté	Independent	25 October 2021
Guinea-Bissau	List	João Bernardo Vieira	PAIGC	29 November 2025
Guyana	List	Hugh Todd	PPP	5 August 2020
Haiti	List	Raina Forbin	Independent	2 March 2026
Holy See	List	Archbishop Paul Gallagher	—N/a	8 November 2014
Honduras	List	Mireya Agüero	National	27 January 2026
Hungary	List	Anita Orbán	Tisza	13 May 2026
Iceland	List	Þorgerður Katrín Gunnarsdóttir	Viðreisn	21 December 2024
India	List	S. Jaishankar	BJP	31 May 2019
Indonesia	List	Arrmanatha Nasir	Independent	1 October 2026
Iran	List	Abbas Araghchi	Independent	21 August 2024
Iraq	List	Fuad Hussein	KDP	6 June 2020
Ireland	List	Helen McEntee	Fine Gael	18 November 2025
Israel	List	Gideon Sa'ar	New Hope	5 November 2024
Italy	List	Antonio Tajani	Forza Italia	22 October 2022
Ivory Coast	List	Kaba Nialé	RHDP	7 January 2026
Jamaica	List	Kamina Johnson Smith	JLP	7 March 2016
Japan	List	Toshimitsu Motegi	LDP	21 October 2025
Jordan	List	Ayman Safadi	Independent	15 January 2017
Kazakhstan	List	Ermek Köşerbaev	Amanat	26 September 2025
Kenya	List	Musalia Mudavadi	Amani	5 October 2023
Kiribati	List	Taneti Mamau (president)	TKP	11 March 2016
Kuwait	List	Jarrah Jaber Al-Ahmad Al-Sabah	—N/a	1 February 2026
Kyrgyzstan	List	Jeenbek Kulubaev	Independent	22 April 2022
Laos	List	Thongsavanh Phomvihane	LPRP	18 November 2024
Latvia	List	Baiba Braže	Unity	19 April 2024
Lebanon	List	Youssef Rajji	Lebanese Forces	8 February 2025
Lesotho	List	Lejone Mpotjoane	RFP	28 October 2022
Liberia	List	Sara Beysolow Nyanti	UP	9 February 2024
Libya	List	Abdul Hamid Dbeibeh (Acting)	Independent	3 September 2023
Liechtenstein		Sabine Monauni	FBP	10 April 2025
Lithuania	List	Kęstutis Budrys	Independent	12 December 2024
Luxembourg	List	Xavier Bettel	DP	17 November 2023
Madagascar	List	Alice N'Diaye	Independent	15 March 2026
Malawi	List	George Chaponda	DPP	5 October 2025
Malaysia	List	Mohamad Hasan	UMNO	12 December 2023
Maldives	List	Iruthisham Adam	Independent	14 April 2026
Mali	List	Abdoulaye Diop	Independent	11 June 2021
Malta	List	Chris Fearne	Labour	4 June 2026
Marshall Islands	List	Kalani Kaneko	Independent	8 January 2024
Mauritania	List	Mohamed Salem Ould Merzoug	El Insaf	31 March 2022
Mauritius	List	Ritish Ramful	Labour	22 November 2024
Mexico	List	Roberto Velasco Álvarez	MORENA	8 April 2026
Federated States of Micronesia	List	Lorin S. Robert	—N/a	9 September 2023
Moldova	List	Mihai Popșoi	PAS	29 January 2024
Monaco		Isabelle Berro-Amadeï	Independent	17 January 2022
Mongolia	List	Battsetseg Batmunkh	MPP	29 January 2021
Montenegro	List	Ervin Ibrahimović	BS	23 July 2024
Morocco	List	Nasser Bourita	Independent	5 April 2017
Mozambique	List	Maria Manuela Lucas	FRELIMO	20 January 2025
Myanmar	List	Tin Maung Swe	Independent	10 April 2026
Namibia	List	Selma Ashipala-Musavyi	SWAPO	22 March 2025
Nauru		Lionel Aingimea	Independent	30 October 2023
Nepal	List	Shishir Khanal	RSP	27 March 2026
Netherlands	List	Tom Berendsen	CDA	23 February 2026
New Zealand	List	Winston Peters	NZ First	27 November 2023
Nicaragua	List	Denis Moncada and Valdrack Jaentschke	FSLN	23 September 2025
Niger	List	Bakary Yaou Sangaré		10 August 2023
Nigeria	List	Yusuf Tuggar	APC	21 August 2023
North Korea	List	Choe Son-hui	Workers' Party	11 June 2022
North Macedonia	List	Timčo Mucunski	VMRO-DPMNE	23 June 2024
Norway	List	Espen Barth Eide	Labour	16 October 2023
Oman	List	Badr bin Hamad Al Busaidi	—N/a	26 August 2020
Pakistan	List	Ishaq Dar	PML(N)	11 March 2024
Palau		Gustav Aitaro	Independent	3 September 2021
Palestine	List	Varsen Aghabekian	Independent	23 June 2025
Panama	List	Javier Martínez-Acha	PRD	1 July 2024
Papua New Guinea	List	Justin Tkatchenko	Pangu Pati	18 January 2024
Paraguay	List	Rubén Ramírez Lezcano	Independent	15 August 2023
Peru	List	Carlos Espá	Partido SíCreo	28 July 2026
Philippines	List	Tess Lazaro	Independent	1 July 2025
Poland	List	Radosław Sikorski	PO	13 December 2023
Portugal	List	Paulo Rangel	PSD	2 April 2024
Qatar	List	Sheikh Mohammed bin Abdulrahman Al Thani (prime minister)	—N/a	27 January 2016
Romania	List	Dan Neculăescu	Independent	20 October 2026
Russia	List	Sergey Lavrov	United Russia	9 March 2004
Rwanda	List	Olivier Nduhungirehe	RPF	12 June 2024
Saint Kitts and Nevis	List	Denzil Douglas	SKNLP	13 August 2022
Saint Lucia	List	Alva Baptiste	Labour Party	5 August 2021
Saint Vincent and the Grenadines	List	Fitzgerald Bramble	New Democratic	2 December 2025
Samoa	List	Laʻauli Leuatea Schmidt (prime minister)	FAST	16 September 2025
San Marino	List	Luca Beccari	PDCS	8 January 2020
São Tomé and Príncipe	List	Ilza Amado Vaz	ADI	13 January 2025
Saudi Arabia	List	Prince Faisal bin Farhan Al Saud	—N/a	29 October 2019
Senegal	List	Cheikh Niang	Independent	5 September 2025
Serbia	List	Marko Đurić	SNS	2 May 2024
Seychelles	List	Barry Faure	US	6 November 2025
Sierra Leone	List	Timothy Kabba	SLPP	10 July 2023
Singapore	List	Vivian Balakrishnan	PAP	1 October 2015
Slovakia	List	Juraj Blanár	Smer	25 October 2023
Slovenia	List	Tone Kajzer	SDS	4 June 2026
Solomon Islands	List	Rick Houenipwela	Democratic Alliance	17 May 2026
Somalia	List	Abdisalam Abdi Ali	Mideeye	3 May 2025
South Africa	List	Ronald Lamola	ANC	30 June 2024
South Korea	List	Cho Hyun	Democratic	19 July 2025
South Sudan	List	James Pitia Morgan		29 April 2026
Spain	List	José Manuel Albares	PSOE	10 July 2021
Sri Lanka	List	Vijitha Herath	NPP	25 September 2024
Sudan	List	Mohieldin Salim Ahmed Ibrahim	Independent	4 September 2025
Suriname	List	Melvin Bouva	NDP	16 July 2025
Sweden	List	Maria Malmer Stenergard	Moderate	10 September 2024
Switzerland	List	Ignazio Cassis	FDP.The Liberals	1 November 2017
Syria	List	Asaad al-Shaibani	HTS	21 December 2024
Tajikistan	List	Sirojiddin Muhriddin	Independent	29 November 2013
Tanzania	List	Mahmoud Thabit Kombo	CCM	26 July 2024
Thailand	List	Sihasak Phuangketkeow	Bhumjaithai	30 March 2026
Timor-Leste	List	Bendito Freitas	CNRT	1 July 2023
Togo	List	Robert Dussey		17 September 2013
Tonga	List	Crown Prince Tupoutoʻa ʻUlukalala	Independent	28 January 2025
Trinidad and Tobago	List	Sean Sobers	UNC	3 May 2025
Tunisia	List	Mohamed Ali Nafti	Independent	25 August 2024
Turkey	List	Hakan Fidan	AK Party	4 June 2023
Turkmenistan	List	Raşit Meredow	TDP	7 July 2001
Tuvalu	List	Paulson Panapa	—N/a	27 February 2024
Uganda	List	Adonia Ayebare	Independent	8 June 2026
Ukraine	List	Andrii Sybiha	Servant of the People	5 September 2024
United Arab Emirates	List	Sheikh Abdullah bin Zayed Al Nahyan	—N/a	9 February 2006
United Kingdom	List	Ed Miliband	Labour	20 July 2026
United States	List	Marco Rubio	Republican	21 January 2025
Uruguay	List	Mario Lubetkin	Broad Front	1 March 2025
Uzbekistan	List	Baxtiyor Saidov		30 December 2022
Vanuatu	List	Marc Ati	Iauko	11 February 2025
Venezuela	List	Oliver Blanco	Independent	29 October 2026
Vietnam	List	Lê Hoài Trung	Communist Party	25 October 2025
Yemen	List	Afrah al-Zouba	Independent	23 July 2026
Zambia	List	Mulambo Haimbe	UPND	28 December 2023
Zimbabwe	List	Amon Murwira	ZANU–PF	15 October 2024

== Other states ==
The following states control their territory and are recognized by at least one UN member state.

State	List	Current foreign minister	Political affiliation		Assumed office
Abkhazia	List	Sergei Shamba		United Abkhazia	6 August 2024
Republic of China (Taiwan)	List	Lin Chia-lung	20 May 2024		
Cook Islands	List	Mark Brown (prime minister)		Independent	8 October 2020
Kosovo	List	Glauk Konjufca		LVV	11 February 2026
Niue	List	Dalton Tagelagi (prime minister)		Independent	11 June 2020
Northern Cyprus	List	Tahsin Ertuğruloğlu		UBP	9 March 2022
Sahrawi Arab Democratic Republic	List	Mohamed Yeslem Beissat		Polisario	12 April 2025
South Ossetia	List	Akhsar Dzhioev			15 August 2022

The following states/governments control their territory, but are not recognized by any UN member states.

State	List	Current foreign minister	Political affiliation	Assumed office
Somaliland	List	Abdirahman Dahir Adam Bakal	Waddani	14 December 2024
Transnistria	List	Vitaly Ignatiev		14 September 2015 (Note: Acting to 30 August 2016 and from 17 December 2016 to 30 January 2017.)

== Other governments ==
The following alternative governments are recognized as a sovereign state by at least one UN member.

State	Government	Current foreign minister	Political affiliation	Assumed office
Myanmar	National Unity Government of Myanmar	Zin Mar Aung	NLD	16 April 2021
Yemen	Supreme Political Council	Hisham Sharaf		28 November 2016

The following alternative governments are not recognized by any UN member states.

State	Government	Current foreign minister	Political affiliation	Assumed office
Libya	Government of National Stability (Note: Alternative government, approved by Parliament, in opposition to the government of Abdul Hamid Dbeibeh.)	Hafez Kaddour		3 March 2022
Tibet	Central Tibetan Administration (Note: Government of Parliament in exile.)	Lobsang Sangay	National Democratic	28 February 2016

== Sui generis entities ==
Entity	List	Current foreign minister	Political affiliation	Assumed office
European Union	List	Kaja Kallas	RE (European)	1 December 2024
European Union	List	Kaja Kallas	Reform (national)	1 December 2024
Sovereign Military Order of Malta		Riccardo Paternò di Montecupo	—N/a	3 September 2022

== Dependent territories ==
Territory	Current foreign minister	Political affiliation	Assumed office
Faroe Islands	Høgni Hoydal		22 December 2022
French Polynesia	Moetai Brotherson (president)	Tāvini Huiraʻatira	15 May 2023
Greenland	Vivian Motzfeldt	Siumut	5 April 2022
Guernsey	Jonathan Le Tocq	Future Guernsey	6 May 2016
Jersey	Philip Ozouf		12 July 2022
New Caledonia	Louis Mapou (President of the Government)	UNI	22 July 2021
Puerto Rico	Rosachely Rivera	New Progressive	3 July 2025
Tokelau	Alapati Tavite (prime minister)	—N/a	12 March 2024

== Autonomous administrative divisions ==
Autonomous region	List	Current foreign minister	Political affiliation	Assumed office
Brussels-Capital Region		Pascal Smet		20 July 2019
Catalonia		Jaume Duch		12 August 2024
Cantabria		Isabel Urrutia	PP	10 July 2023
Flanders		Jan Jambon (Minister-President)	N-VA	2 October 2019
Gagauzia		Vitaliy Vlah		30 April 2015
Kurdistan Region		Safeen Dizayee	KDP	21 July 2019
Quebec		Martine Biron	CAQ	20 October 2022
Scotland	List	Angus Robertson	SNP	21 May 2021
Wallonia		Elio Di Rupo (Minister-President)	PS	13 September 2019

== See also ==
- Category:Lists of foreign ministers by year
- Lists of office-holders
- List of current presidents of legislatures
- List of current heads of state and government
- List of current vice presidents and designated acting presidents
- List of current permanent representatives to the United Nations
- List of female foreign ministers
