= 2025 African Union Commission Chairperson election =

2025 AUC Chairperson election
- 15 February 2025

49 eligible (Note: As of February 2025, six member states were suspended.) votes of the AU member states 33 votes needed to win
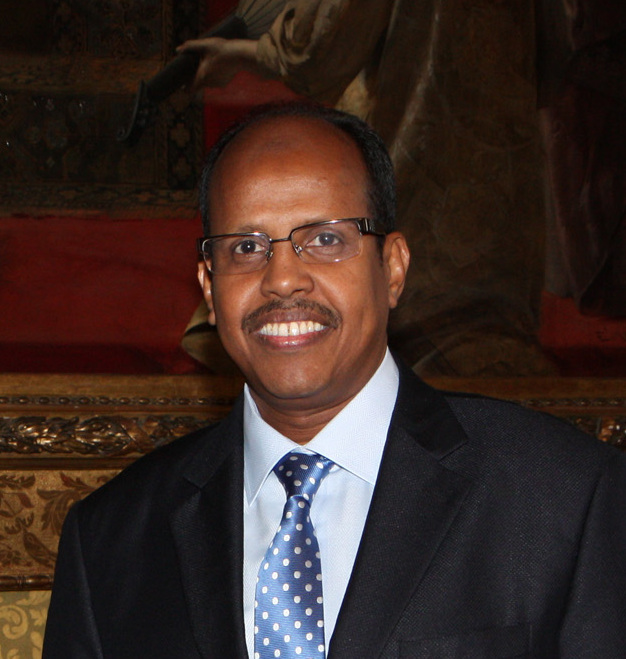

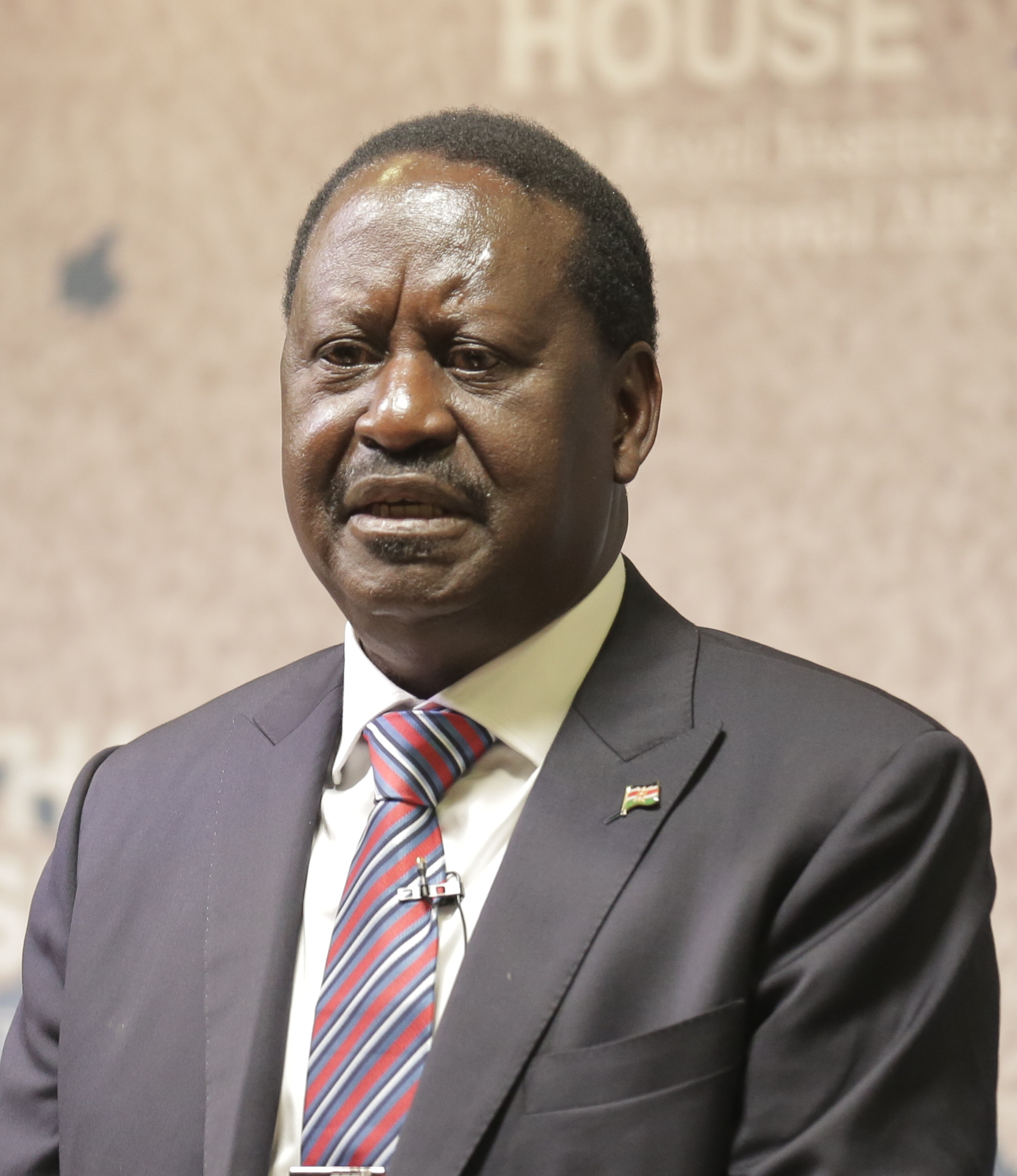
Candidate	Mahamoud Ali Youssouf	Raila Odinga
Country	Djibouti	Kenya
Votes (6th round)	26	22
Votes (7th round)	33	–
Commission Chair before election
Moussa Faki
Elected Commission Chair
Mahamoud Ali Youssouf

An African Union (AU) Commission Chairperson election was held in February 2025 to choose the fifth Commission Chair to succeed Chairperson Moussa Faki. On 15 February 2025, Djibouti's Mahamoud Ali Youssouf was elected with 33 votes in the seventh round of voting. He was inaugurated on 13 March.

== Background ==
Nominations were open until 6 August 2024. The new chair was elected at the 38th AU Summit in Addis Ababa, Ethiopia, in February 2025 by the AU Assembly via a secret ballot.

Past chairpersons have hailed from western, central and southern regions of the African Union. The AU Executive Council asserted the right of the East African region to produce the next chairperson and North Africa was therefore assigned the deputy chairperson post.

The election was overshadowed by various conflicts afflicting the continent, particularly the M23 offensive in the DR Congo.

== Candidates ==
Candidates are nominated by their respective countries. The three final candidates had varying campaign agendas.

Kenya's Raila Odinga is a well-known figure in Kenyan politics with a strong reputation, and was considered by many to have been the leading candidate. He wanted to use Africa's natural and human resources to ensure prosperity. He prioritised the African Continental Free Trade Area, managing conflicts, and propelling Africa's global influence.

Djibouti's Mahamoud Ali Youssouf is the longest serving Djiboutian Foreign Minister and is well-versed in international diplomacy. He emphasised integration, peace, and good governance.

Madagascar's Richard Randriamandrato is an expert in governance and international relations. He emphasised solidarity between nation states amid fierce global competition, particularly around natural resources and international powers. He also emphasised the need for the AU to be more proactive in conflict mediation and sustainable development.

Official candidates
Image	Name	Prior experience	Nominator	Endorsements	Vote pledges (including nominating country)
	Mahamoud Ali Youssouf	Foreign Minister (2005–)	Djibouti	Somalia; Organisation of Islamic Cooperation	2
	Raila Odinga	Former AU High Representative for Infrastructure Development (2018–2023); Former Prime Minister (2008–2013)	Kenya	Algeria; Angola; Botswana; Burundi; Central African Republic; Congo; Democratic Republic of the Congo; Equatorial Guinea; The Gambia; Ghana; Guinea-Bissau; Malawi; Mauritius; Nigeria; Rwanda; Seychelles; South Sudan; Tanzania; Togo; Uganda; Zambia; Zimbabwe; East African Community (Note: According to Kenyan President William Ruto.)	23
	Richard Randriamandrato	Former Foreign Minister	Madagascar	Southern African Development Community	1

=== Withdrew ===
Official candidates
Image	Name	Prior experience	Nominator	Notes
	Anil Gayan	Former Foreign Minister	Mauritius	After the 2024 general election, Prime Minister Navin Ramgoolam endorsed Raila Odinga.
	Fawzia Yusuf Adam	Former Deputy Prime Minister and Foreign Minister (2012–2014)	Somalia	Was asked by her government to withdraw in order to support Djibouti's candidacy.; She endorsed Raila Odinga instead.
	Vincent Meriton	Former Vice-President (2016–2020)	Seychelles	Withdrew interest due to arising health concerns.

=== Potential candidates ===
Image	Name	Prior experience	Country	Regional group
	Hery Rajaonarimampianina	Former President (2014–2018)	Madagascar	East Africa
	Jakaya Kikwete	African Union High Representative for Libya (2016–), former President (2005–2015), former African Union Chairperson (2008–2009), former Foreign Minister (1995–2005); He has played a pivotal role in peace processes in the Arusha Accords (Burundi), Democratic Republic of the Congo, 2007–2008 Kenyan crisis, Operation Democracy in Comoros, 2008–2009 Zimbabwean political negotiations and 2009 Malagasy political crisis.	Tanzania	East Africa
	January Makamba	Former Foreign Minister (2023–2024)	Tanzania	East Africa
	Mohamed El-Amine Souef	Special Representative of the AUC Chairperson (SRCC) for Somalia and Head of the African Union Transition Mission in Somalia (2022–); Former Foreign Minister	Comoros	East Africa
	Specioza Kazibwe	Former Vice President (1994–2013)	Uganda	East Africa
	Uhuru Kenyatta	East African Community–Led Nairobi Process Facilitator (2022–) of peace talks in eastern Democratic Republic of the Congo; Former President (2013–2022)	Kenya	East Africa

== Mjadala Afrika ==
The 2024 edition of the Mjadala Afrika ("African debate" in Swahili) took place on 13 December. It offered the three candidates an opportunity to lay out their vision for the continent and how to deal with its pressing challenges. The candidates introduced themselves and answered questions posed by two moderators (one English-speaking, the other French-speaking), along with questions from online participants. The debate's format sought to encourage transparency and direct communication with the African people. The debate was televised via public broadcasters of the 55 member states.

All three candidates supported Africa's bid to have two seats with veto power on the United Nations Security Council in order to amplify the continent's voice in global affairs and have representation at the highest levels of decision-making. The candidates discussed the issue of dependency in security matters, highlighting the importance of the African Standby Force. The candidates also discussed ways to enhance the African Continental Free Trade Area by introducing a single currency and payment compensation systems, aimed at improving economic growth. They also all emphasised structural reforms and cooperation between member states. Candidates also lamented the decline of pan-Africanism.

Kenya's Raila Odinga emphasised the power of youth and women in driving economic growth and proposed policies accordingly. He also noted the need for better infrastructure to improve connectivity across the continent.

Djibouti's Mahamoud Ali Youssouf highlighted Africa's geopolitical position and emphasised partnerships with the global community. He also noted the importance of technology and innovation in making Africa more competitive globally. Analyst Ueli Staeger noted that Youssouf demonstrated a better grasp of the internal financial mechanisms in the AU's reforms than his competitors, and fared well in the overall debate.

Madagascar's Richard Randriamandrato focussed on climate change, and proposed policies addressing biodiversity loss. He also emphasised the role of education and healthcare in long-term development.

== Result ==
On 15 February 2025, Djibouti's Mahamoud Ali Youssouf was elected with 33 votes in the seventh round of voting. He was sworn in on 13 March.

Result
Candidate	Round 1	Round 2	Round 3	Round 4	Round 5	Round 6	Round 7
Mahamoud Ali Youssouf	18	19	23	25	26	26	33
Raila Odinga	20	22	20	21	21	22	–
Richard Randriamandrato	10	7	5	–	–	–	–
Abstain	1	1	1	2	2	1	2
Spoilt	–	–	–	1	–	–	–
No	–	–	–	–	–	–	14
Total	49	49	49	49	49	49	49

== Reactions ==
Leaders and countries from Africa and across the world congratulated Youssouf for his win, including IGAD Executive Secretary Workneh Gebeyehu, China and UN Secretary-General António Guterres. In a message on X, Djiboutian President Ismaïl Omar Guelleh said that Youssouf's election was "a proud moment for Djibouti and Africa" and that "[Youssouf's] leadership will serve Africa with dedication and vision".

The Indian Express opined that there was dominance by French speakers and the Arab League, a tendency against larger countries' older candidates, and a gender gap.
