= Fiona Lortan =

African Union's Deputy Special Representative to Somalia

Deputy Special Representative of the AU Commission Chairperson for Somalia
- Incumbent
- Assumed office February 2022

Personal details
- Citizenship: South African
- Education: University of KwaZulu-Natal; University of Cambridge
- Occupation: Diplomat
- Known for: Peace and security work in Africa

Fiona Lortan is a South African national who is the Deputy Special Representative of the AU Commission Chairperson (DSRCC) for Somalia and Deputy Head of Mission. She assumed this office in February 2022.

== Early life and education ==
Fiona was born in South Africa. She had her Bachelor's degree in Literature from University of Kwa-Zulu Natal in Durban, South Africa and a Master of Philosophy degree in Social and Political Theory from the University of Cambridge, United Kingdom.

== Career ==
She started her career with the African Union Commission from May 2002. She held various positions to ensure peace and security on the continent. She was recently acting director of Conflict Management in the Department of Political Affairs, Peace and Security (PAPS) and worked on AMISOM. She previously worked in Khartoum, Sudan, as a member of the AU High Level Panel on Implementation for Sudan and South Sudan, led by former South African President, Thabo Mbeki.

She is currently the Deputy Special Representative of the AU Commission Chairperson (DSRCC) for Somalia and Deputy Head of Mission.
