= Rajoelina (surname) =

Rajoelina is a Malagasy surname. Notable people with the surname include:

- Andry Rajoelina (born 1974), Malagasy politician and businessman
- Patrick Rajoelina (born 1954), Malagasy politician, lobbyist, author, and teacher
