= Richard (surname) =

Richard can be a surname. Variations include: Ricard, Riccard(s), Richard(s), Ritchard, Richardson, Richardsson, Ricquart, Rijkaard, Rickaert, Ryckewaert

== Geographical distribution ==
As of 2014, 27.4% of all known bearers of the surname Richard were residents of Tanzania (frequency 1:354), 25.9% of France (1:481), 14.0% of the United States (1:4,847), 8.7% of Nigeria (1:3,806), 7.0% of Canada (1:985), 2.0% of Madagascar (1:2,178), 1.9% of Haiti (1:1,046), 1.5% of Sudan (1:4,677), 1.3% of Togo (1:1,021) and 1.2% of Kenya (1:7,138).

In France, the frequency of the surname was higher than national average (1:481) in the following regions:

1. Collectivity of Saint Martin (1:119)
2. Pays de la Loire (1:222)
3. Centre-Val de Loire (1:319)
4. Bourgogne-Franche-Comté (1:373)
5. Brittany (1:375)
6. Grand Est (1:422)
7. Nouvelle-Aquitaine (1:462)
8. Normandy (1:474)

== People ==
=== A ===
- Achille Richard (1794–1852), French botanist and physician
- Adam Richard, Australian comedian
- Alain Richard (born 1945), French politician
- Alison Richard (born 1948), English academic administrator
- Ambrose D. Richard (1850–1917), Canadian lawyer and politician
- Antoine Richard (born 1960), French athlete
- Antoine Richard du Cantal (1802–1891), French doctor, veterinarian, agronomist and politician
- Aurélie Richard (born 2005), French para-alpine skier

=== B ===
- Bernard Richard (born 1951), Canadian social worker, lawyer, and politician

=== C ===
- Carl J. Richard, American historian
- Charles Richard (1900–1978), Canadian politician
- Charles-Louis Richard (1711–1794), French Catholic theologian
- Charlie Richard (1941–1994), American football player and coach
- Chris Richard (baseball) (born 1974), American baseball player
- Chris Richard (basketball) (born 1984), professional basketball player
- Christian Rémi Richard (born 1941), Malagasy politician and diplomat
- Clayton Richard (born 1983), American baseball player
- Clément Richard (1939–2022), Canadian lawyer, businessman and politician
- Cliff Richard (born 1940), English pop star
- Clovis-Thomas Richard (1892–1976), Canadian lawyer and politician
- Colette Richard (1924–2020), French actress
- Cyprien Richard (born 1979), French alpine skier

=== D ===
- Darryl Richard (American football) (born 1986), American football player
- Davius Richard, American football player
- Dawn Richard (model) (born 1936), American model and actress
- Dawn Richard (singer) (born 1983), Haitian-American singer, songwriter, and dancer
- Deb Richard (born 1963), American golfer
- Dee Richard (born 1955), American politician
- Doug Richard, British-based American businessman

=== E ===
- Edmond Richard (cinematographer) (1927–2018), French cinematographer
- Edmond Richard (writer), French writer
- Édouard Richard (1844–1904), Canadian historian and politician
- Emily Richard (1948–2024), British actress
- Eric Richard (born 1940), English actor
- Ernest Richard (1922–2006), Canadian businessman and politician
- Etienne Richard (c. 1621–1669), French composer, organist and harpsichordist

=== F ===
- Fabrice Richard (born 1973), French footballer
- Ferdinand Richard (born 1950), French musician
- Firmine Richard (born 1947), Guadeloupean actress
- Fleury François Richard (1777–1852), French painter
- François-Marie-Benjamin Richard (1819–1908), French archbishop

=== G ===
- Gabriel Richard (1767–1832), French-American Roman Catholic priest turned politician
- Gary Richard American football player
- George Anderson Richard (1861–1943), mine manager in Queensland, Australia
- Georges Richard (died 1922), French automobile pioneer
- Gerry Richard, Canadian curler and coach
- Graham Richard, American politician
- Guy A. Richard (born 1932), Canadian judge

=== H ===
- Henri Richard (1936–2020), Canadian ice hockey player
- Henry Richard (1812–1888), Welsh Congregational minister and Member of Parliament
- Hughes Richard (1934–2026), Swiss poet and writer

=== I ===
- Ivor Richard, Baron Richard (1932–2018), British politician

=== J ===
- J. R. Richard (1950–2021), American baseball player
- Jacques Richard (1952–2002), Canadian ice hockey player
- Jamey Richard (born 1984), American football player
- Jean-Baptiste-Trefflé Richard (1856–1927), Canadian farmer, notary and politician
- Jean-Claude Richard (1727–1791), French painter and engraver
- Jean-Louis Richard (1927–2012), French actor, film director and scriptwriter
- Jean-Marc Richard (ice hockey) (born 1966), retired Canadian ice hockey player
- Jean-Marc Richard (TV and radio presenter) (born 1960), Swiss radio and television personality
- Jean-Marie Richard (1879–1955), Canadian politician
- Jean Michel Claude Richard (1787–1868), French botanist
- Jean-Pierre Richard (1922–2019), French writer and literary critic
- Jean-Thomas Richard (1907–1991), Canadian politician
- Jean Richard (actor) (1921–2001), French actor
- Jean Richard (historian), French historian
- John Richard (born 1934), Canadian judge
- Joseph-Adolphe Richard (1887–1964), Canadian politician
- Jules Richard (mathematician) (1862–1956), French mathematician

=== K ===
- Kris Richard (born 1979), American football coach

=== L ===
- Larry Richard (born 1965), American basketball player
- Lee Richard, American baseball player
- Lorraine Richard (born 1959), Canadian politician
- Louis Claude Richard (1754–1821), French botanist

=== M ===
- Marcel Richard (1907–1976), French Catholic priest and Greek paleographer
- Mary Richard (1940–2010), Canadian aboriginal activist and politician
- Maurice Richard (1921–2000), Canadian ice hockey player
- Maurice Richard (politician) (born 1946), Canadian politician
- Mark Richard, American short story writer, novelist, screenwriter, and poet
- Marthe Richard (1889–1982), French prostitute and spy who later became a politician
- Michael Richard (photographer) (1948–2006), American rock musician and photographer
- Michael Wayne Richard (1959–2007), American rapist and murderer
- Michel Richard (1948–2016), French chef
- Mike Richard (born 1966), Canadian ice hockey player
- Mireille Richard (born 1989), Swiss ski mountaineer
- Monique Richard, Canadian politician

=== N ===
- Naicka Richard (born 1995), known as Naïka, American-born singer and songwriter
- Natalie Richard, Canadian television personality
- Nathalie Richard (born 1962), French actress
- Nelly Richard, French-born cultural theorist now based in Chile
- Nina Richard (born 2000), French footballer

=== O ===
- Oliver G. Richard, American businessman
- Olivier Jules Richard (1836–1896), French botanist

=== P ===
- Pascal Richard (born 1964), Swiss racing cyclist
- Paul Richard, Mayor of New York from 1735 to 1739
- Philippe Richard (1891–1973), French actor
- Pierre Richard (born 1934), French actor
- Pierre Richard (banker) (born 1941)

=== R ===
- Robert Ri'chard (born 1983), American television and movie actor
- Rod Richard (born 1932), American athlete
- Ron Richard (1947–2023), American politician
- Ronald G. Richard (born 1968), American Marine Corps officer
- Ruth Richard (1928–2018), American baseball player

=== S ===
- Sabrina Richard (born 1977), French weightlifter
- Stanley Richard (born 1967), American football player

=== T ===
- Ted Richard, Canadian politician and lawyer
- Timothy Richard (1845–1919), Welsh Baptist missionary to China
- Turbo Richard (born 2006), American football player
- Tyran Richard (born 1982), American model

=== V ===
- Viola Richard (1904–1973), American actress
- Virgil A. Richard (1937–2013), American army general and gay rights activist

=== W ===
- Wendy Richard (1943–2009), English actress
- Will Richard (born 2002), American basketball player

=== Z ===
- Zachary Richard (born 1950), American Cajun singer/songwriter and poet
- Zinaida Richard (1832–1890), Russian and French dancer of French origin, the wife of Louis Mérante

== See also ==
- Richard
- Richards (surname)
