= Arisoa Razafitrimo =

Malagasy politician

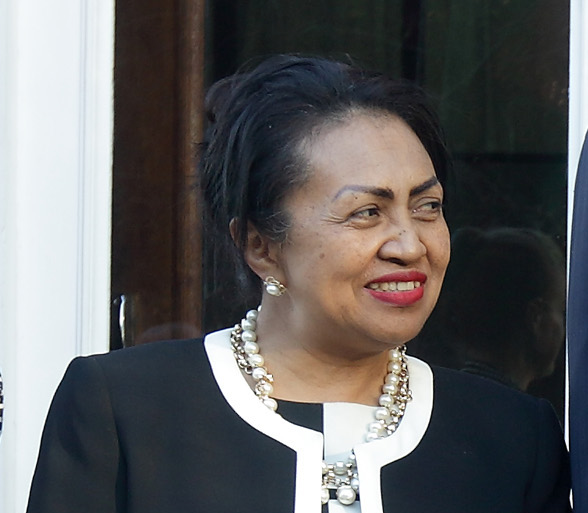

Minister of Foreign Affairs
- In office 2014–2015
- Preceded by: Ulrich Andriantiana (acting)
- Succeeded by: Béatrice Atallah

Personal details
- Born: 26 April 1954 (age 72) Toamasina, Madagascar
- Education: University of Madagascar
- Profession: Diplomat

Arisoa Lala Razafitrimo (born 26 April 1954) is a Malagasy politician who was Minister of Foreign Affairs of Madagascar from 2014 to 2015. She was educated at the University of Madagascar.
