= Mahamoud Ali Youssouf =

Djiboutian politician (born 1965)

- Macamuud Qali Yuusuf; Maxamuud Cali Yuusuf محمود علي يوسف
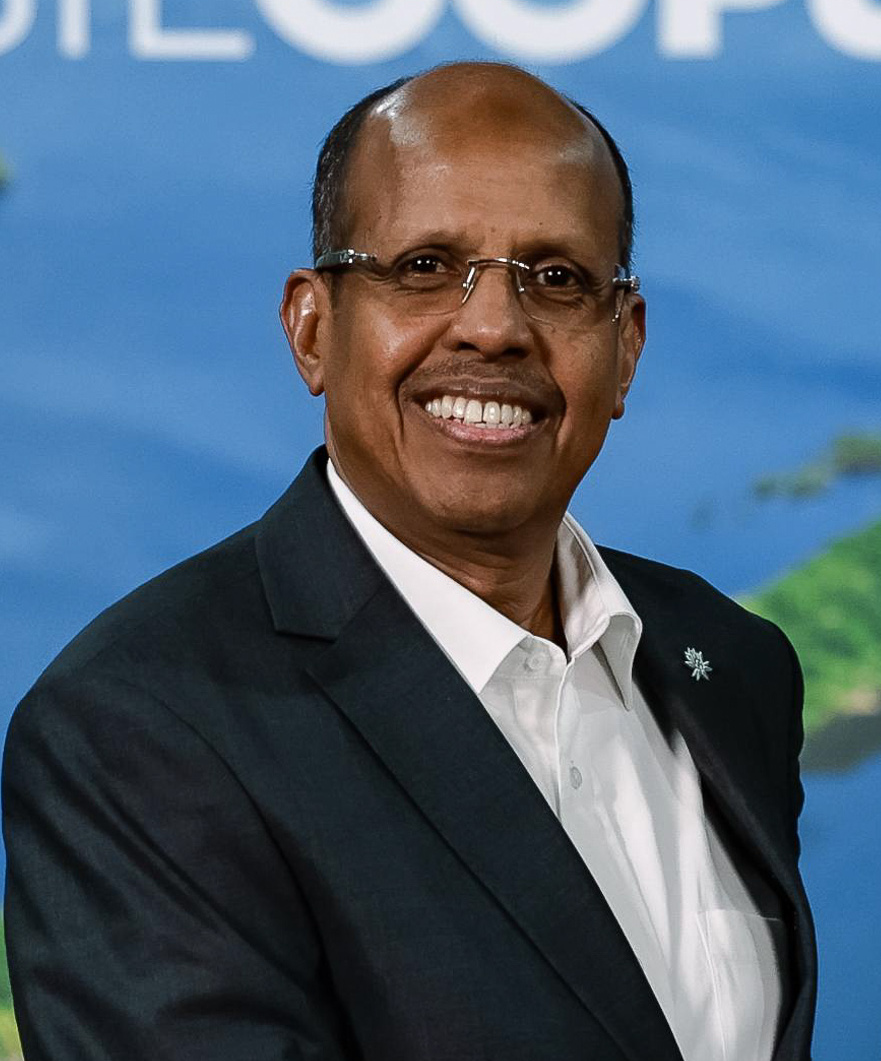
- Youssouf in 2025

5th Chairperson of the African Union Commission
- Incumbent
- Assumed office 13 March 2025
- Preceded by: Moussa Faki

Minister of Foreign Affairs
- In office 22 May 2005 – 1 April 2025
- President: Ismaïl Omar Guelleh
- Preceded by: Ali Abdi Farah
- Succeeded by: Abdoulkader Houssein Omar

Personal details
- Born: 2 September 1965 (age 61) Djibouti City, French Somaliland (now Djibouti)
- Party: People's Rally for Progress
- Education: Lumière University Lyon 2
- Website: www.may-ua2025.dj

Mahamoud Ali Youssouf (Note: Afar: Macamuud Qali Yuusuf; Somali: Maxamuud Cali Yuusuf; Arabic: محمود علي يوسف) (born 2 September 1965) is a Djiboutian diplomat and the chairperson of the African Union Commission. He is the longest-serving Djiboutian foreign minister, having served from 2005 to 2025.

In April 2024, he was nominated by Djibouti for the position of the chairperson of the African Union Commission. On 15 February 2025, he won the election in Addis Ababa, Ethiopia, after 7 rounds of voting.

== Early life and education ==
Mahamoud Ali Youssouf was born on 2 September 1965 in Djibouti City. He received his basic education in Djibouti. He is Afar.

Yousouf's further educational journey took him to the United Kingdom, France, and Canada. He studied business management at the University of Liverpool and obtained his master's degree in management in 1990. He wrote his thesis at the Free University of Brussels in the 1990s.

== Diplomatic career ==
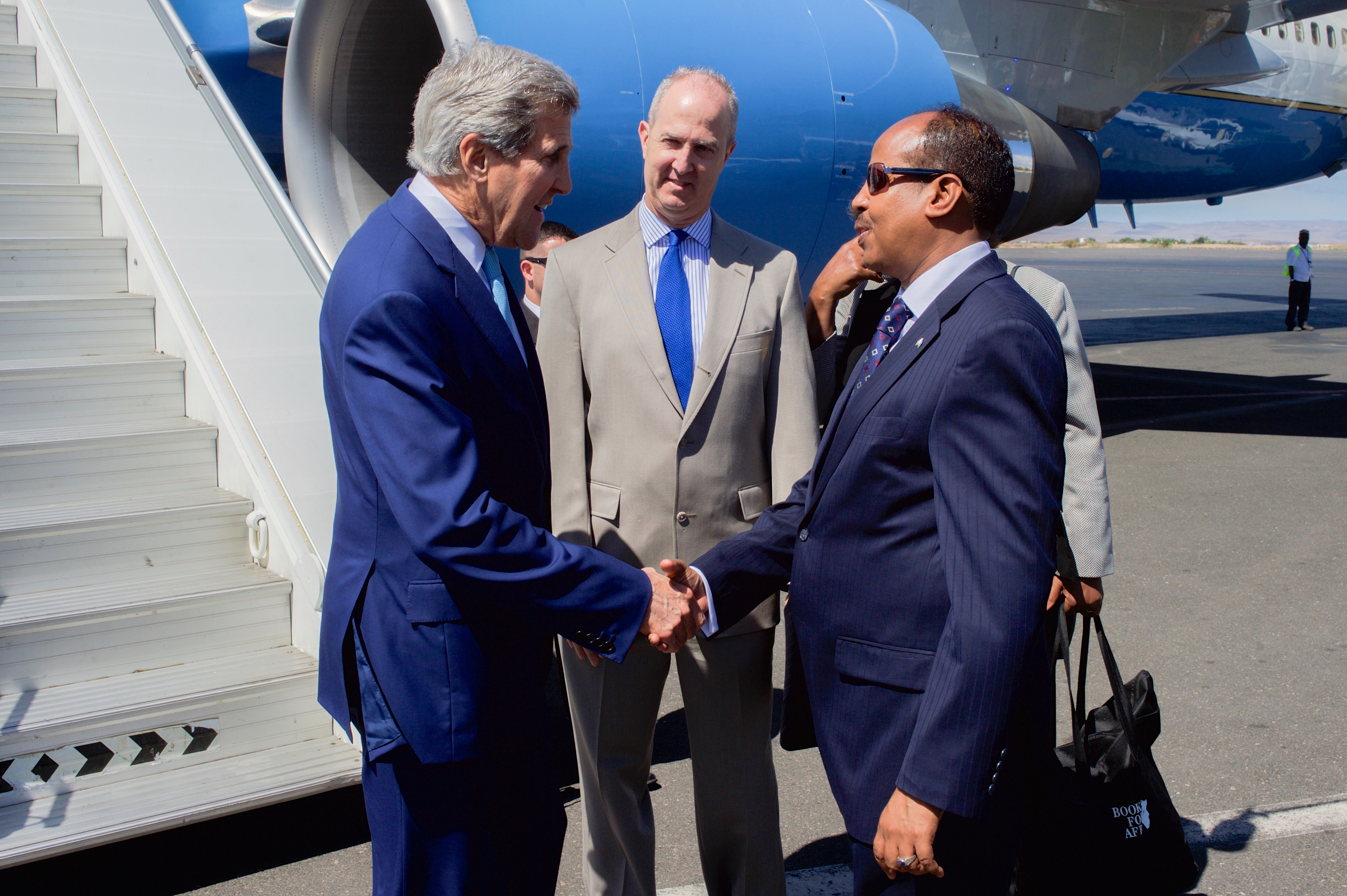
Youssuf meeting with U.S. Secretary of State John Kerry in 2015

Youssouf worked at Djibouti's Ministry of Foreign Affairs and headed its Arab affairs department during the 1990s. He served as Ambassador to Egypt from 1997 to 2001.

Youssouf was appointed Minister-Delegate for International Cooperation on 4 July 2001. He was subsequently appointed Minister of Foreign Affairs and International Cooperation on 22 May 2005. In 2006, he visited Japan.

In 2008, Youssouf served as Chairman of the 129th Ordinary Session of the Council of Foreign Ministers of the Arab League.

Youssouf has played important roles in international diplomacy, especially in the Horn of Africa. Speaking to The New York Times in 2008, Youssouf said that although Djibouti was a small country, it had a sizable port and hoped to develop its economy along the same lines as Dubai. He highlighted the country's strategic location, which he asserted was better positioned than Dubai.

== Chairperson of African Union ==
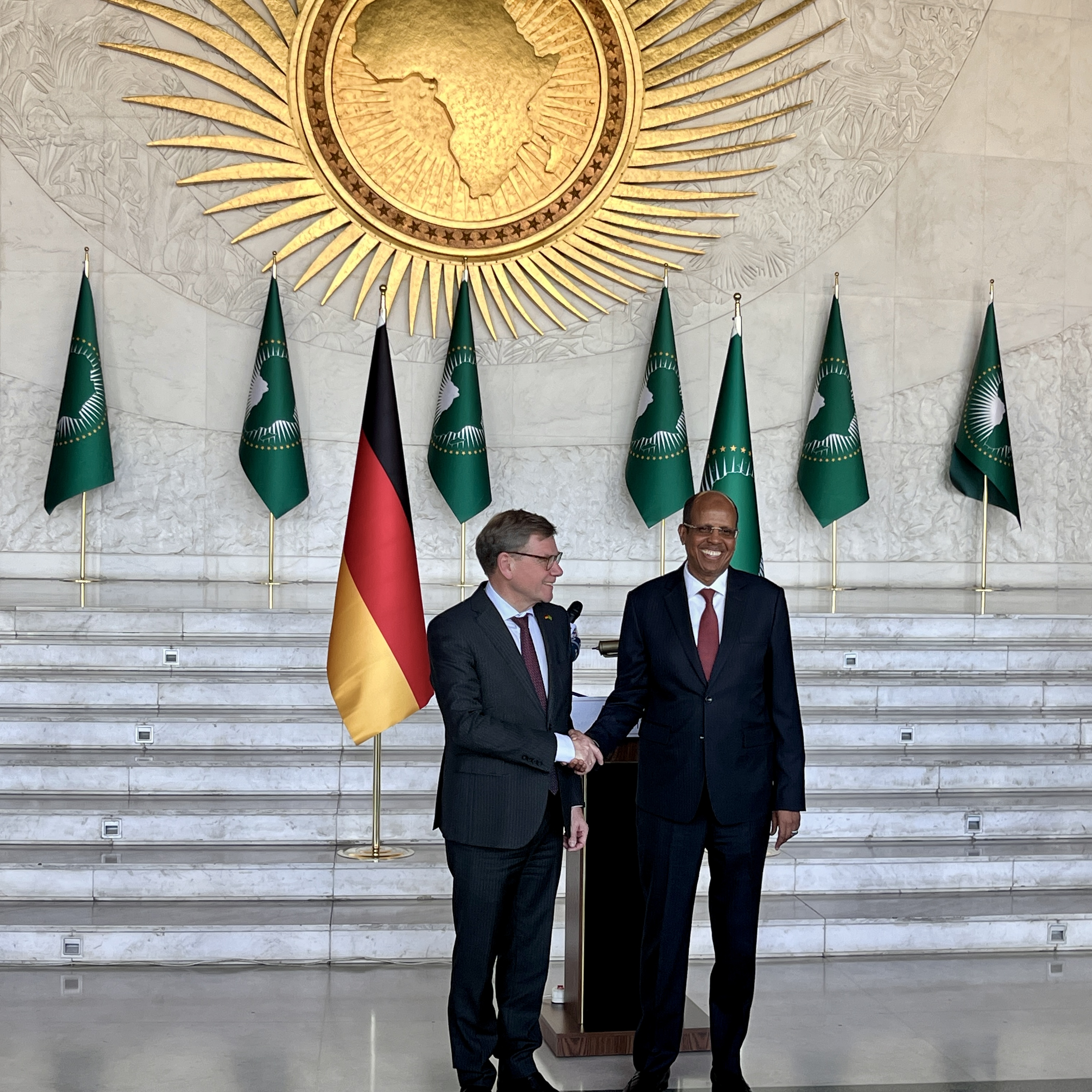
Johann Wadephul and Mahamoud Ali Youssouf in Addis Ababa (January 2026)

Djibouti nominated Youssouf as their candidate for the Chairperson of the African Union Commission (AUC) in April 2024. Youssouf considered peace and security his top priority. In the AUC chair candidates debate, Youssouf stated that African countries should lead the way in dealing with security issues and should stop depending on other nations. He criticised the Peace and Security Council for being reactive rather than proactive and noted that the African Standby Forces were rarely utilised due to funding issues. He was endorsed by the Organisation of Islamic Cooperation.

On 15 February 2025, Youssouf was elected as the Chairperson of the African Union, succeeding Chadian Moussa Faki. The election, held in Addis Ababa, Ethiopia, was decided by member states of the African Union after seven rounds of voting, in which he defeated Madagascar's Richard Randriamandra then Kenya's Raila Odinga, the leading candidate. Youssouf received congratulatory messages from the UN Secretary-General António Guterres and from across the continent.

In October 2025, Youssouf expressed "deep concern" regarding increasing violence and reported atrocities, including alleged war crimes and ethnically targeted killings of civilians, in El Fasher, Sudan.

== Personal life ==
Youssouf is fluent in Somali, Arabic, Afar, English, and French.

He is said to have a close relationship with Djiboutian President Ismaïl Omar Guelleh.

== See also ==
- List of current foreign ministers
- Moussa Faki
