= Minister of Foreign Affairs (Madagascar) =

Minister of Foreign Affairs of the Republic of Madagascar is a government minister in charge of the Ministry of Foreign Affairs of Madagascar, responsible for conducting foreign relations of the country.

The following is a list of foreign ministers of Madagascar since its founding in 1960:

No.	Name (Birth–Death)	Portrait	Tenure
1	Albert Sylla (1909–1967)		1960–1967
2	Jacques Rabemananjara (1913–2005)		1967–1972
3	Didier Ratsiraka (1936–2021)		1972–1975
4	Albert Zakariasy (1926–1993)		1975
5	Rémi Tiandrazana (1934–2015)		1975–1976
6	Jean Bemanajara (1943–1997)		1976
7	Bruno Rakotomavo (b. 1940)		1976–1977
8	Christian Rémi Richard (b. 1941)		1977–1983
(6)	Jean Bemanajara (1943–1997)		1983–1991
9	Césaire Rabenoro (1923–2002)		1991–1993
10	Jacques Sylla (1946–2009)		1993–1996
11	Evariste Marson (b. 1938)		1996–1997
12	Herizo Razafimahaleo (1955–2008)		1997–1998
13	Lila Ratsifandrihamanana (b. 1959)		1998–2002
14	Azaly Ben Marofo (b. 1946)		2002
15	Marcel Ranjeva (b. 1944)		2002–2009
16	Ny Hasina Andriamanjato		2009–2010
17	Hyppolite Ramaroson (b. 1951)		2010–2011
18	Yvette Sylla		2011
19	Pierrot Rajaonarivelo (b. 1946)		2011–2013
—	Ulrich Andriantiana (b. 1977) Acting Minister		2013–2014
20	Arisoa Razafitrimo (b. 1954)		2014–2015
21	Béatrice Atallah (b. 1959)		2015–2017
22	Henry Rabary Njaka (b. 1965)		2017–2018
23	Eloi Alphonse Maxime Dovo (b. 1957)		2018–2019
24	Naina Andriantsitohaina (b. 1963)		2019–2020
25	Djacoba Tehindrazanarivelo		2020–2021
26	Patrick Rajoelina (b. 1954)		2021–2022
27	Richard Randriamandrato (1959–2026)		2022
—	Léon Rakotonirina (b. 1963) Acting Minister		2022–2023
(18)	Yvette Sylla		2023–2024
29	Rasata Rafaravavitafika		2024–2025
30	Christine Razanamahasoa		2025–2026
31	Alice N'Diaye		2026–present
