= Ruth Monteiro =

Bissau-Guinean lawyer

Minister of Justice and Human Rights of Guinea-Bissau
- In office July 2019 – February 2020
- Prime Minister: Aristides Gomes
- Preceded by: Mamadú Iaia Djaló
- Succeeded by: Fernando Mendonça

Personal details
- Party: Patriotic Movement
- Education: University of Lisbon

Ruth Monteiro is a Bissau-Guinean lawyer. She was the Minister of Justice and Human Rights.

== Education ==
Ruth Monteiro has a degree in Law from the Faculty of Law of the University of Lisbon, awarded in 1985.
