= Césaire Rabenoro =

Malagasy writer, teacher and politician

Césaire Rabenoro (27 August 1923 – 24 January 2002) was a Malagasy writer, teacher, diplomat and politician. He served as the Minister of Foreign Affairs of Madagascar between 1991 and 1993 and the key person to Peace Corps Volunteers' first intervention to Madagascar. He also served as ambassador to France, Italy, Greece, Israel and the United Kingdom, based in Paris.

He wrote several books about external affairs, most notably "Les relations extérieures de Madagascar" published on May 3, 2000. He died on 24 January 2002, at the age of 78.
