= Patrick Rajoelina =

Malagasy politician, lobbyist, author and teacher

Minister of Foreign Affairs
- In office 15 August 2021 – before March 2022
- Preceded by: Djacoba Tehindrazanarivelo
- Succeeded by: Richard Randriamandrato

Personal details
- Born: 1 January 1954 (age 72) Paris
- Profession: Teacher, author, lobbyist
- Website: vwww.prince.mg

Patrick Rajoelina (born 1 January 1954) is a Malagasy politician, lobbyist, author and teacher who was the minister of foreign affairs of Madagascar from 15 August 2021 until February 2022.

In 2013 he was promoted Chevalier (knight) of the French Legion of Honour.

== Personal life ==
He is the founder of the NGO "Société des amis de Madagascar" and the Lobbying company "Prince – Patrick Rajoelina International Network & Communication". He is also the author of eight books about Madagascar. Rajoelina taught for 20 years at the École supérieure de journalisme de Paris.

He does not have any relationship to the Malagasy president Andry Rajoelina.
