= Rafaravavitafika Rasata =

Malagasy politician

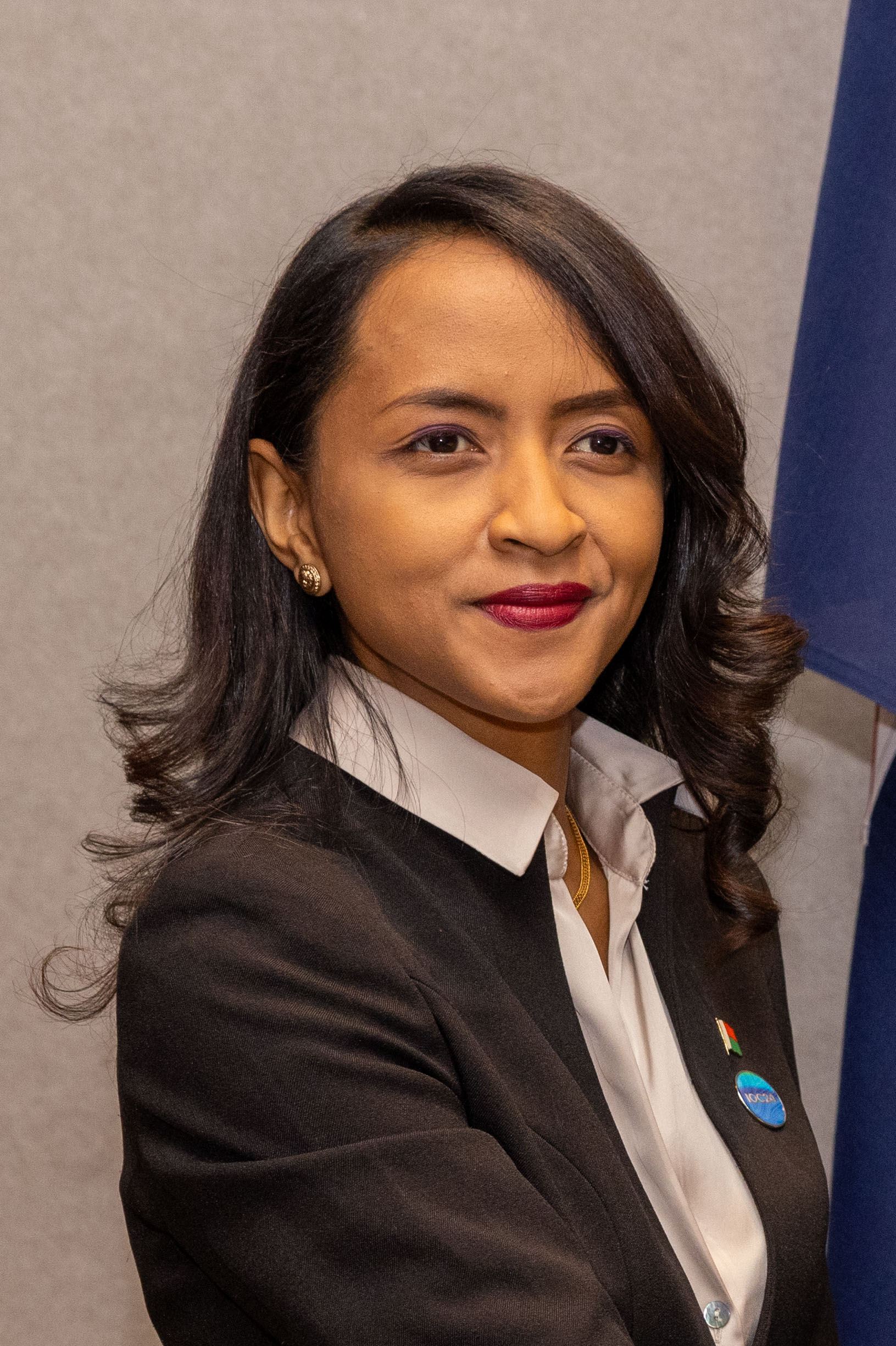

Minister of Foreign Affairs
- In office 15 January 2024 – 2025
- Preceded by: Yvette Sylla
- Succeeded by: Christine Razanamahasoa

Rafaravavitafika Rasata is Malagasy diplomat and politician who was appointed Minister of Foreign Affairs of Madagascar on January 14, 2024. She is the 5th and youngest woman to hold this position in the history of Malagasy diplomacy.

== Career ==
Before her appointment as Minister, Rafaravavitafika Rasata worked within the Ministry of Foreign Affairs for a number of years, as Chief of Staff, Spokesperson, and Director of Economic Expansion. At her swearing-in, she said that her priorities would be the promotion of economic diplomacy, the participation of the Malagasy diaspora in the country's development, and promoting the country's image overseas. She met with US Ambassador Claire Pierangelo on 5 February, before attending the 7th Indian Ocean Conference in Perth.

== Education ==
Rasata studied public law and political science at the Catholic University of Madagascar in 2011. She completed a Master's degree in International Public Service at the Ecole des Hautes Etudes Internationales in Paris in 2012, followed by further studies at the École nationale d'administration de Madagascar in 2016. She holds a PhD in international relations and diplomacy from the Centre d'Etudes Diplomatiques et Stratégiques in Paris.
