= Alice N'Diaye =

Malagasy diplomat and politician

Minister of Foreign Affairs
- Incumbent
- Assumed office 25 March 2026
- President: Michael Randrianirina
- Preceded by: Christine Razanamahasoa

Personal details
- Profession: Diplomat

Alice N'Diaye is a Madagascan diplomat who has served as the country's Minister of Foreign Affairs since March 2026.

== Education ==
N'Diaye is a graduate of Madagascar's National School of Administration and has a master's degree in Public Law and Political Sciences from the University of Antananarivo.

== Career ==
N'Diaye is a career diplomat and civil servant who began working in regional and multilateral affairs in 2002. N'Diaye worked as a Policy Analyst at the Ministry of Foreign Affairs Center for Strategic Studies and Analysis and was Embassy Counselor at Madagascar’s Permanent Representation to the African Union in Addis Ababa. From March 2019 to July 2022, she was Director General of International Cooperation at the Ministry of Foreign Affairs. From July 2023 to 2025, she was seconded as a director at the General Secretariat of the Indian Ocean Commission.

N'Diaye was appointed Foreign Minister by President of the transitional period of the Republic Michael Randrianirina on 25 March 2026. She was formally appointed by Prime Minister Mamitiana Rajaonarison and welcomed in a handover ceremony by her predecessor, Christine Razanamahasoa, with N'Diaye calling herself "one of the ministry's own".
