= Minister of Foreign Affairs (Djibouti) =

This is a list of foreign ministers of Djibouti.

- 1977–1978: Abdallah Mohamed Kamil
- 1978–1993: Moumin Bahdon Farah
- 1993–1995: Mohamed Bolock Abdou
- 1995–1999: Mohamed Moussa Chehem
- 1999–2005: Ali Abdi Farah
- 2005–2025: Mahamoud Ali Youssouf
- 2025–Incumbent: Abdoulkader Houssein Omar

== Sources ==
- Rulers.org – Foreign ministers A–D
