= Abdoulkader Houssein Omar =

Djiboutian politician

- عبد القادر حسين عمر

Minister of Foreign Affairs
- Incumbent
- Assumed office 1 April 2025
- Preceded by: Mahamoud Ali Youssouf

Personal details
- Party: Independent

Abdoulkader Houssein Omar is a Djiboutian politician who has been Minister of Foreign Affairs since 2025. He previously served as Djibouti’s ambassador to Kuwait and Jordan.
