= National School of Administration =

National School of Administration or National School of Public Administration may refer to:

- École nationale d'administration, Strasbourg, France
- École nationale d'administration publique, Quebec City, Quebec, Canada
- China National School of Administration, Beijing, China
- National School of Public Administration (Greece), Athens, Greece
- National School of Public Administration (Poland), Warsaw, Poland
- National School of Administration (Algeria), Algiers, Algeria
