= Safeen Dizayee =

Minister of Foreign Relations of Kurdistan Regional Government

Safeen Muhsin Dizayee
- سەفین دزەیی

Minister of Foreign Relations
- Incumbent
- Assumed office July 21, 2019
- Prime Minister: Masrour Barzani
- Preceded by: Falah Mustafa Bakir

Minister of Education
- In office 2009–2012
- Prime Minister: Barham Salih

Chief of Staff to the Prime Minister
- Prime Minister: Nechirvan Barzani

Personal details
- Born: 1963 (age 62–63) Erbil, Iraq
- Party: KDP
- Parent: Muhsin Dizayee
- Education: Berkshire College of Art and Design
- Occupation: Politician

Safeen Muhsin Dizayee (Sorani Kurdish: سەفین دزەیی) is an Iraqi Kurdish politician serving as Minister and Head of the Department of Foreign Relations of the Kurdistan Regional Government since July 21, 2019. He is a member of the Kurdistan Democratic Party.

== Political career ==
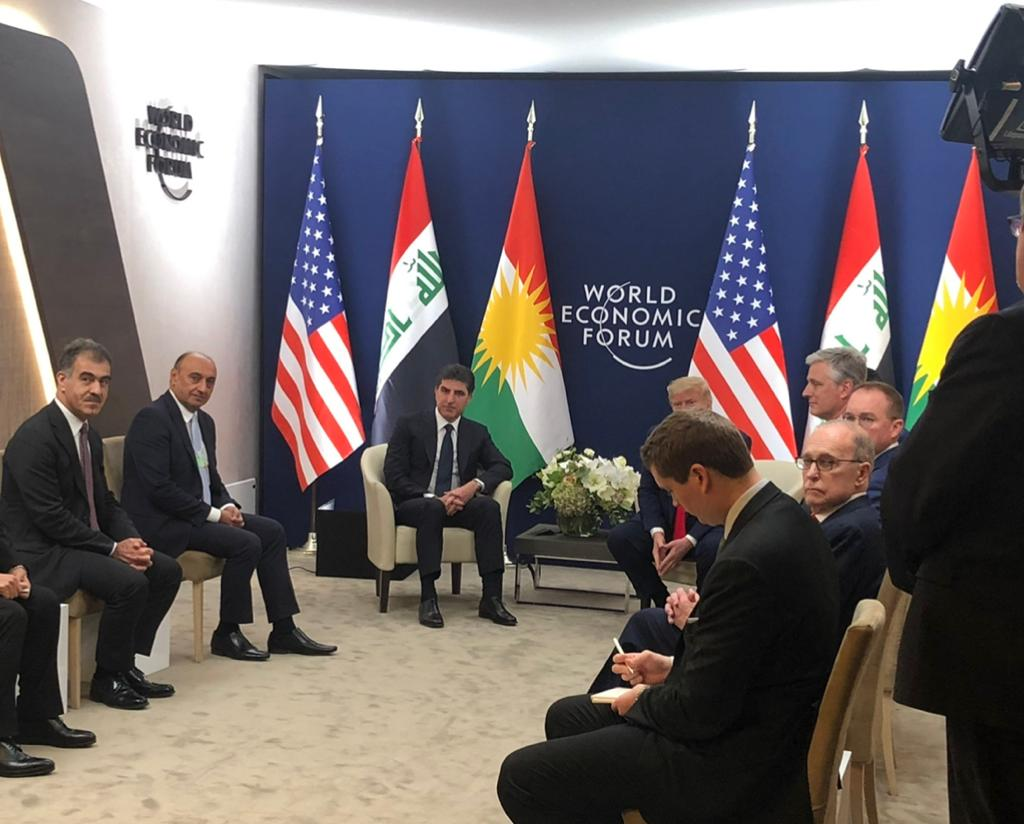
Davos, January 22, 2020

Safeen Dizayee has held several prominent positions in the Kurdish political landscape. Prior to his current role as Minister and Head of the Department of Foreign Relations of the Kurdistan Regional Government (KRG), Dizayee served as Chief of Staff to Prime Minister Nechirvan Barzani. He was also the spokesperson and Head of the Department of Media and Information (DMI) for the KRG during the 7th and 8th cabinets, where he played a significant role in diplomatic outreach and media relations for the regional government.

From 2009 to 2012, Dizayee served as the Minister of Education in the KRG's 6th cabinet. During his tenure, he was involved in the modernization of the region's educational system, focusing on curriculum reform and the development of educational standards.

In addition, Dizayee headed the Kurdistan Democratic Party (KDP) International Relations Office from 2004 to 2009, and served as the KDP representative in Turkey starting in 1992, a key position in maintaining cross-border relations for the Kurdish cause. His early diplomatic experience has been crucial in shaping his current role in foreign relations for the KRG.
