= Gustav Aitaro =

Palauan minister of state

- Aitaro at a desk at a meeting of UN countries

Minister of State of Palau
- Incumbent
- Assumed office c. August 2021
- President: Surangel Whipps Jr.
- Preceded by: Uduch Sengebau Senior

Personal details
- Party: Independent

Gustav N. Aitaro is a Palauan politician who serves as the Minister of State of Palau. He was a state legislator in Koror from 2006 to 2010 and worked in the Japanese Embassy in Koror as a political advisor from 2018 to 2019. In his capacity as Minister of State, he has advocated for environmental sustainability and has aligned his country towards the United States, Japan, and Taiwan.
