= Chairperson of the African Union Commission =

- Flag of the African Union

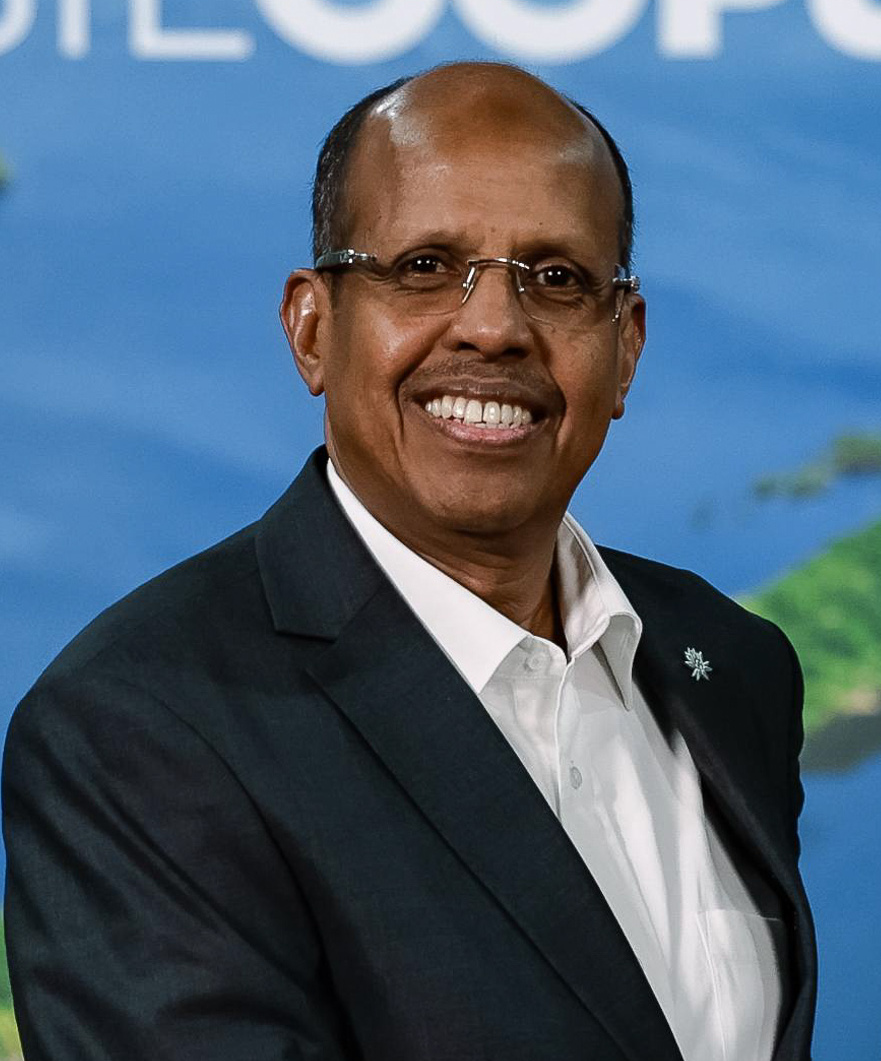
- Incumbent; Mahamoud Ali Youssouf since March 13, 2025
- African Union Commission
- Style: Excellency
- Status: Chief Executive Officer; Legal representative; Chief Accounting Officer
- Abbreviation: AUC Chairperson
- Reports to: AU Executive Council
- Seat: AU Office Complex, Addis Ababa, Ethiopia
- Appointer: AU Assembly (elected by the AU Executive Council)
- Term length: 4 years, renewable once
- Constituting instrument: Constitutive Act of the AU (article 20)
- Precursor: Secretary General of the Organisation of African Unity
- Inaugural holder: Alpha Oumar Konaré
- Formation: 16 September 2003
- Salary: $186,921 (per annum)
- Website: au.int/en/cpauc

The chairperson of the African Union Commission is the head of the African Union Commission (AUC). They are the chief executive officer, legal representative of the African Union (AU), and the commission’s chief accounting officer. They are elected for a four-year term, renewable once, by the Assembly of the African Union.

The position was preceded by the secretary general of the OAU, and the role became more powerful upon the formation of the AU. The chairperson is responsible for the commission's finances and administration, promoting its objectives, dealing with key stakeholders (member states, development partners, regional blocs etc.), appointing and managing commission staff, and storing AU and OAU treaties and legal instruments.

== History ==
The Organisation of African Unity (OAU) was founded in 1963 and sought to resolve Africa's challenges through cooperation and unity between the nation-states, embodying a pan-Africanist vision. It had an equivalent role titled the Secretary General of the Organisation of African Unity, however the position had weaker powers and was largely ceremonial.

In 2002 the OAU evolved into the African Union (AU) in a push for more regional integration, with the role of the Secretary General replaced with the Chairperson of the Commission, which was tasked with implementing the AU's vision. This new role became more vocal in their praise or condemnation. Amara Essy, as Secretary General, was tasked with leading the OAU's transition into the AU, aiming for it to be more effective in addressing Africa's political, economic, and security challenges. His most important action was to implement the AU's operational framework, including the creation of the Peace and Security Council in the image of the UN Security Council. Despite this, some African leaders feared for their national sovereignty, and obtaining funding and commitment proved challenging.

Essy was succeeded by former Malian President Alpha Oumar Konaré, who served from September 2003 to April 2008. He focussed on institutionalising reforms and regional stability. He played a pivotal role in establishing the African Peace Facility aimed at financing peacekeeping. Despite this, his tenure also faced financial challenges and divisions among members, and he did not seek re-election.

The next election was won by Gabonese politician Jean Ping, who served from 2008 to 2012. He sought greater political integration and aimed to address security challenges, however, faced similar challenges to his predecessor, and received criticism for his handling of crises in Libya and Côte d'Ivoire towards the end of his tenure. Amid various coups on the continent, Ping initiated consultations aimed at restoring constitutional order. Ping sought re-election however failed to garner a two-thirds majority.

South African politician Nkosazana Dlamini-Zuma won the next election, becoming the first woman to serve as Chairperson, and served from 2012 to 2017. Her leadership style was bureaucratic and reform-driven. She initiated Agenda 2063, and championed industrialisation, gender equality, and intra-African trade. She also set up the African Standby Force for peacekeeping, however faced significant criticisms directed at her leadership style and her handling of conflicts in South Sudan, Central Africa, and Burundi. She did not seek re-election.

The next election was won by former Chadian Prime Minister Moussa Faki, who served his first term from 2017 to 2021. He aimed to be more politically engaged and pragmatic than his predecessor and championed institutional and financial reforms. He oversaw the establishment of the African Continental Free Trade Area and sought greater funding from member states to reduce overreliance on external donors. He also oversaw Africa's Covid-19 response, obtaining vaccines, and was re-elected in 2021. Despite his pro-active leadership, under his tenure Africa experienced various coups and major conflicts, with critics characterising the AU's role as advisory, lacking the power to enforce its decisions.

In February 2025, the Assembly elected Djibouti politician Mahamoud Ali Youssouf to Chairperson.

== Role ==
The commission chairperson is the chief executive officer, legal representative of the African Union (AU), and the commission’s chief accounting officer. The chairperson is responsible for the Commission's finances and administration, promoting its objectives, dealing with key stakeholders (member states, development partners, regional blocs etc.), appointing and managing Commission staff, and storing AU and OAU treaties and legal instruments. The Commission Chairperson is responsible for facilitating and reporting all AU organ meetings, and for ensuring conformity between all AU initiatives. They also prepare the AU's annual report.

The Commission Chairperson is elected for a four-year term, renewable once, by the Assembly of the African Union. The election is via secret ballot, and must have a two-thirds majority of present voting members. The position has a monthly salary of $15,576.75 along with perks for funding children's education.

== List ==
| No. | Portrait | Chairperson | Took office | Left office | Country | Region |
|---|---|---|---|---|---|---|
| – | | Amara Essy; Acting | 9 July 2002 | 16 September 2003 | Ivory Coast | West Africa |
| 1 | | Alpha Oumar Konaré | 16 September 2003 | 28 April 2008 | Mali | West Africa |
| 2 | | Jean Ping | 28 April 2008 | 15 October 2012 | Gabon | Central Africa |
| 3 | | Nkosazana Dlamini-Zuma | 15 October 2012 | 14 March 2017 | South Africa | Southern Africa |
| 4 | | Moussa Faki | 14 March 2017 | 12 March 2025 | Chad | Central Africa |
| 5 | | Mahamoud Ali Youssouf | 13 March 2025 | Incumbent | Djibouti | East Africa |

== See also ==
- Chairperson of the African Union
