= Béatrice Atallah =

Malagasy politician

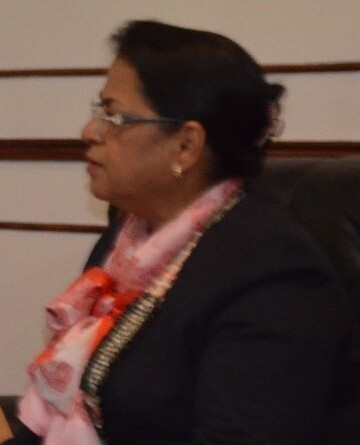
- Atallah in 2016
- Born: Béatrice Jeanine Atallah; 17 August 1959 (age 66); Anosy, Madagascar
- Occupation: Politician

Béatrice Jeanine Atallah (born 17 August 1959) is a Malagasy politician from Lebanese origins who has served as Madagascar's Minister of Foreign Affairs since January 2015 until August 2017.

== Early life and education ==
Atallah was born in 1959 in Anosy. Her father was a senior official in the colonial administration and she therefore has dual Malagasy and French citizenship. She has master's degree in private law (1988) and a certificate in Diplomatic Studies from the Centre for Strategic and Diplomatic Studies (2009).

== Career ==
Atallah was a magistrate, spending three years on the Antananarivo Court of Appeal, and claims to be apolitical.

Atallah was a member of the National Electoral Council from 2002 until 2009, and an advisor to then-Minister of Finance Hery Rajaonarimampianina from 2009 to 2013, before being appointed to chair the Commission for Elections from December 2013 until January 2015, managing the 2013 election which was won by Rajaonarimampianina. There were some allegations of "illicit" disbursements of commission funds raised against her, which she denied.

Atallah was appointed as Minister of Foreign Affairs on 25 January 2015 in the government of Jean Ravelonarivo. She was reappointed in April 2016 by Olivier Mahafaly Solonandrasana. She is the chair of the Indian Ocean Commission.
