= Selma Ashipala-Musavyi =

Namibian politician

The Honourable Selma Ashipala-Musavyi
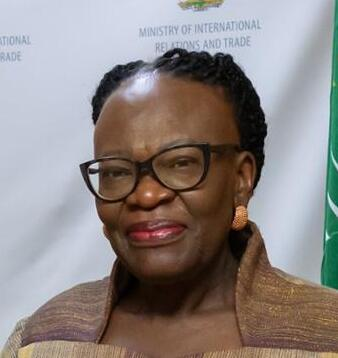
- Selma Ashipala-Musavyi (2026)

Minister of International Relations and Trade
- Incumbent
- Assumed office 21 March 2025
- President: Netumbo Nandi-Ndaitwah
- Prime Minister: Elijah Ngurare
- Deputy: Jennely Matundu
- Preceded by: Peya Mushelenga

Personal details
- Born: 16 June 1960 (age 66) Walvis Bay, Namibia
- Party: SWAPO
- Education: Keele University
- Profession: Diplomat, public administrator

Selma Ashipala-Musavyi (born 16 June 1960) is a Namibian diplomat who is serving as the minister of international relations and trade as well as a member of the National Assembly of Namibia since 21 March 2025 as a member of the SWAPO Party.

== Early life and education ==
Selma Ashipala-Musavyi was born on 16 June 1960 in the coastal town of Walvis Bay in Erongo Region, Namibia. She acquired a master's degree in diplomatic studies from Keele University.

== Career ==
In March 2020, she was appointed as a higher commissioner to Ghana, the position that she held until her subsequent appointment as a minister on 21 March 2025. Ashipala-Musavyi retired from public service in 2020 after joining the ministry of foreign affairs in 1990 as deputy director. The highlight of her public service was her appointment in June 2013 as the first woman to be appointed then as permanent secretary in the foreign affairs ministry. In her role as permanent secretary, she chaired high-level meetings at SADC and SADC Organ on politics, defence, and security. She also served as the chair of the board of the United Nations secretary general advisory board on disarmament. She held several ambassadorial roles, including ambassador to Austria and higher commissioner to Nigeria, among other roles.
