= Christian Rémi Richard =

Malagasy politician and diplomat

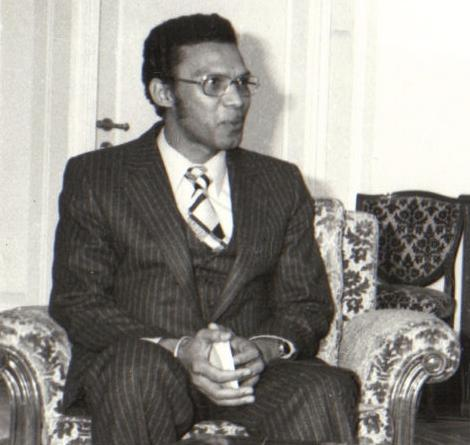
Christian Remi Richard

Christian Rémi Richard (born 3 May 1941) is a former politician and diplomat in Madagascar. Richard was foreign minister under President Admiral Didier Ratsiraka from 1977 to 1983.
