= Richard Randriamandrato =

Malagasy diplomat and public official (1959–2026)

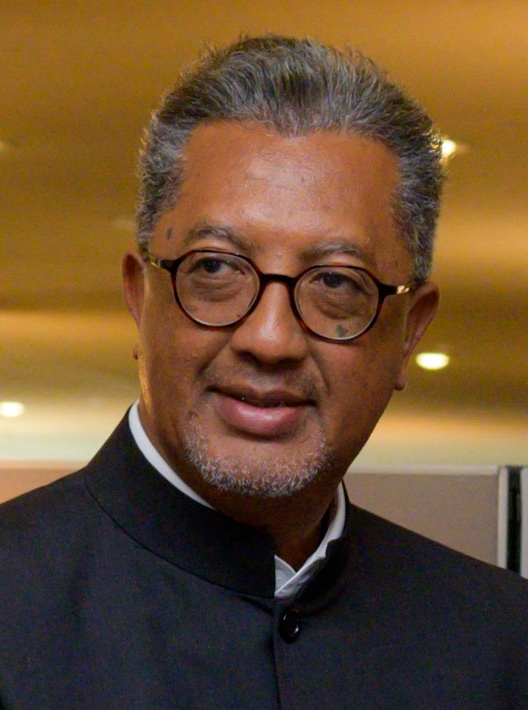
- Randriamandrato in 2022

Minister of Economy and Finance
- In office 2019–2021

Minister of Foreign Affairs
- In office 2021–2021

Director of Cabinet, Ministry of Foreign Affairs
- In office December 2000 – January 2002

Personal details
- Born: 7 March 1959
- Died: 15 March 2026 (aged 67)
- Education: Université Libre de Bruxelles; Institut d'Études Politiques d'Aix-en-Provence; Georgetown University
- Occupation: Diplomat, economist, public servant

Richard Randriamandrato (7 March 1959 – 15 March 2026) was a Malagasy diplomat, economist and public servant with experience in international relations, finance and development. He has held significant positions in both the Malagasy government and international organisations, contributing to economic development, diplomacy and regional integration in Africa.

== Early life and education ==
Richard Randriamandrato pursued his higher education in international relations and political science. In 1983, he obtained a Diploma in Political Studies with a focus on International Relations from the Institut d'Études Politiques d'Aix-en-Provence in France. He earned a master's degree in international politics from the Université libre de Bruxelles in Belgium in 1992. Additionally, he completed an executive program in international finance at the Georgetown University School of Business in 1999.

== Career ==
=== Government roles ===
Randriamandrato has served in various high-ranking positions within the Malagasy government. He was the director of the Cabinet at the Ministry of Foreign Affairs from December 2000 to January 2002, where he managed the minister's office, coordinated joint programs with international organizations such as the United Nations and the World Bank, and participated in diplomatic missions, including negotiations during lead-up to the 2008 invasion of Anjouan.

He served as the minister of economy and finance from 2019 to 2021, where he managed a team of 10,000 agents and navigated the economic challenges posed by the COVID-19 pandemic. He also served as the minister of foreign affairs in 2021, overseeing a team of 300 agents and representing Madagascar in international forums.

=== International experience ===
Randriamandrato has worked within the African Union (AU) and the Common Market for Eastern and Southern Africa (COMESA). He spent ten years at COMESA, where he worked under the leadership of Secretaries General Erastus Mwencha and Sindiso Ngwenya. During his tenure, he worked in regional integration, leadership, and management, contributing to the organization's efforts to promote economic cooperation among member states.

=== Contributions to development ===
Randriamandrato has been involved in community development initiatives in his home village in Madagascar. He founded a community development association that has implemented various projects, including the construction of footbridges, dip tanks, poultry houses, fish ponds, and water and sanitation facilities. He has also been a strong advocate for environmental conservation, launching initiatives to educate young people about the effects of plastic pollution and organizing regular beach cleanups.

In addition to his community work, Randriamandrato has contributed to the implementation of New Partnership for Africa's Development (NEPAD) flagship projects, particularly in the Indian Ocean region. He has emphasized the importance of self-reliance and community-driven development, believing that local initiatives are essential for sustainable progress.

=== Candidacy for African Union Commission Chairperson ===
In 2024, Randriamandrato was nominated as Madagascar's candidate for the Chairperson of the African Union Commission (AUC). His campaign emphasized the need for proactive leadership to address the continent's challenges and to avoid procrastination in implementing key initiatives. He articulated a vision for energizing the African Union and enhancing its effectiveness in promoting development and unity across member states. He lost the vote to Mahamoud Ali Youssouf of Djibouti on 15 February 2025.

== Death ==
Randriamandrato died on 15 March 2026, at the age of 67.

== Publications ==
Randriamandrato authored and co-authored several publications on economic development and risk management, including:

- Natural Disaster and Risk Management Strategy (UNDP, 2000)
- National Human Development Report 2000 (UNDP Madagascar, 2000)
- New Horizon: An Export-Led Strategy for Madagascar Private Sector Development (World Bank, 1991)
- Framework Document for the Establishment of Free Zones in Madagascar (World Bank, 1987)
