= Alexandra Hill Tinoco =

Salvadoran politician

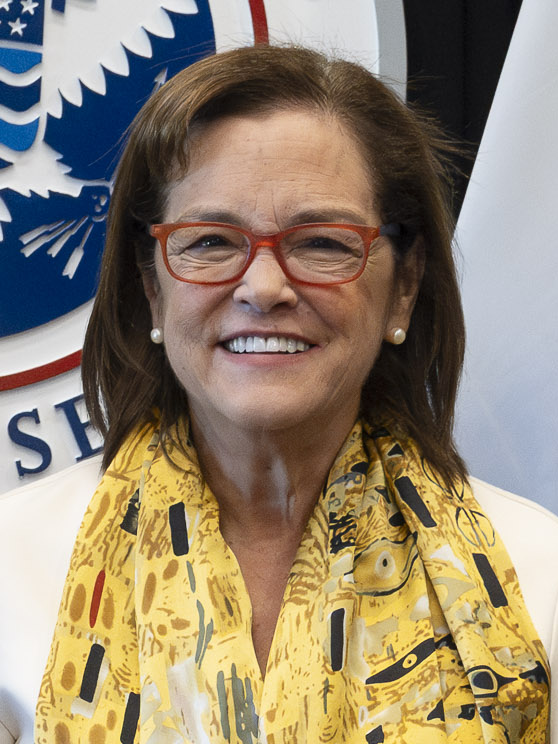
- Alexandra Hill Tinoco in 2024

Minister of Foreign Affairs of El Salvador
- Incumbent
- Assumed office 1 June 2019
- President: Nayib Bukele; Claudia Rodríguez (acting)
- Preceded by: Carlos Castaneda

Personal details
- Born: 1965 (age 60–61) San Salvador, El Salvador

Alexandra Hill Tinoco is a Salvadoran politician who has been El Salvador's Foreign Minister since June 2019.

== Early life and education ==
Hill Tinoco is the daughter of Jaime Hill, who was president of the Anti-drug Foundation of El Salvador (Fundasalva) and alderman of the municipal council of San Salvador. She has a Bachelor of Arts in political science and Latin American studies from Boston University and a master's degree from the Johns Hopkins Bloomberg School of Public Health, where she was a NIDA Humphrey Fellow and specialized in public policy management, prevention of drug use and drug abuse treatment.

She is a member of the Hill family, whose roots go back to James Hill, an Englishman who sailed to El Salvador in order to start a coffee-planting business. The business developed greatly by using new strategies to develop new coffee mixtures.

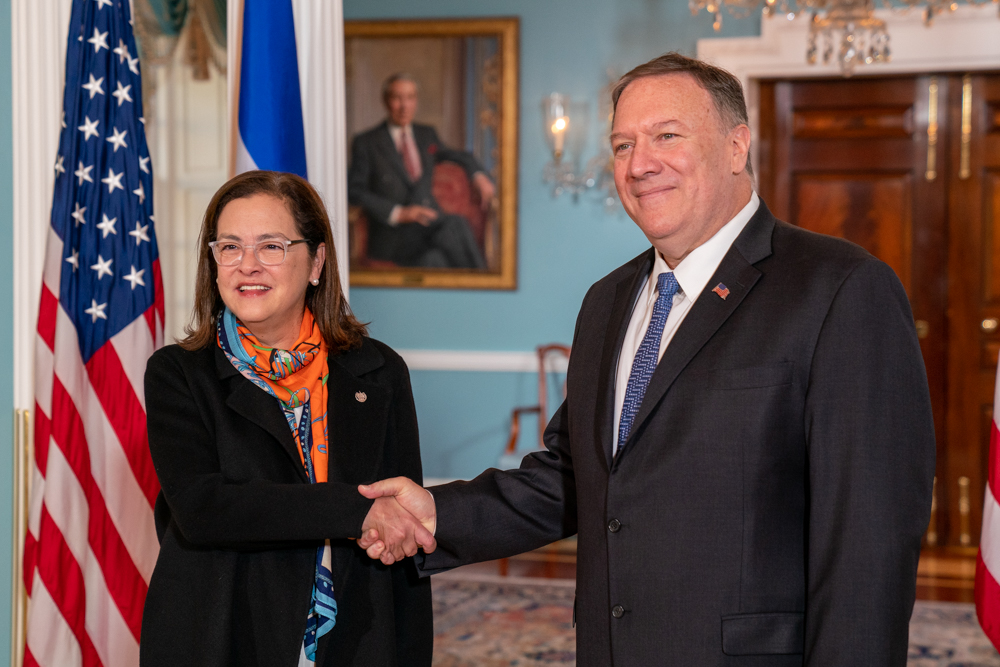
Hill Tinoco meets with U.S. Secretary of State Michael R. Pompeo at the Department of State in Washington D.C. in October 2019.

== Career ==
Hill Tinoco worked as executive director of Fundasalva, an NGO focused on the prevention and treatment of drug abuse. She was a member of the Inter-American Drug Abuse Control Commission in 2006 and led the Drug Reduction Section in 2012.

Hill Tinoco has worked in the Organization of American States and with the United States Department of State and the United Nations Office on Drugs. Along with Elizabeth Lira, she authored the book The Other Face of Peace (1995). Hill Tinoco was the first cabinet appointment announced by President-elect Nayib Bukele, on Twitter, in May 2019. She was sworn in on 1 June 2019.
