= List of foreign ministers in 2016 =

This is a list of foreign ministers in 2016.

== Africa ==
- Algeria - Ramtane Lamamra (2013–2017)
- Angola - Georges Rebelo Chicoti (2010–2017)
- Benin -
  1. Saliou Akadiri (2015–2016)
  2. Aurélien Agbénonci (2016–present)
- Botswana - Pelonomi Venson-Moitoi (2014–2018)
- Burkina Faso -
  1. Moussa Nébié (2015–2016)
  2. Alpha Barry (2016–2021)
- Burundi - Alain Aimé Nyamitwe (2015–2018)
- Cameroon- Lejeune Mbella Mbella (2015–present)
- Cape Verde -
  1. Jorge Tolentino (2014–2016)
  2. Luís Felipe Tavares (2016–2021)
- Central African Republic -
  1. Samuel Rangba (2015–2016)
  2. Charles-Armel Doubane (2016–present)
- Chad - Moussa Faki (2008–2017)
- Comoros -
  1. Abdoulkarim Mohamed (2015–2016)
  2. Mohamed Bacar Dossar (2016–2017)
- Congo–Brazzaville (Republic of the Congo) - Jean-Claude Gakosso (2015–present)
- Congo–Kinshasa (Democratic Republic of the Congo) -
  1. Raymond Tshibanda (2012–2016)
  2. Léonard She Okitundu (2016–2019)
- Djibouti - Mahamoud Ali Youssouf (2005–present)
- Egypt - Sameh Shoukry (2014–present)
- Equatorial Guinea - Agapito Mba Mokuy (2012–2018)
- Eritrea - Osman Saleh Mohammed (2007–present)
- Ethiopia -
  1. Tedros Adhanom (2012–2016)
  2. Workneh Gebeyehu (2016–2019)
- Gabon -
  1. Emmanuel Issoze-Ngondet (2012–2016)
  2. Pacôme Moubelet-Boubeya (2016–2017)
- The Gambia - Neneh MacDouall-Gaye (2015–2017)
- Ghana - Hanna Tetteh (2013–2017)
- Guinea -
  1. François Lonseny Fall (2012–2016)
  2. Makalé Camara (2016–2017)
- Guinea-Bissau -
  1. Artur Silva (2015–2016)
  2. Soares Sambú (2016)
  3. Jorge Malú (2016–2018)
- Ivory Coast (Côte d'Ivoire) -
  1. Charles Koffi Diby (2012–2016)
  2. Albert Toikeusse Mabri (2016)
  3. Marcel Amon Tanoh (acting) (2016–2020)
- Kenya - Amina Mohamed (2013–2018)
- Lesotho -
  1. Tlohang Sekhamane (2015–2016)
  2. 'Mamphono Khaketla (2016–2017)
- Liberia -
  1. Elias Shoniyin (acting) (2015–2016)
  2. Marjon Kamara (2016–2018)
- Libya
  - Government of House of Representatives of Libya (Government of Libya internationally recognized to 12 March 2016) - Mohammed al-Dairi (2014–2019)
  - National Salvation Government of Libya, government of New General National Congress of Libya (Government of Libya in rebellion internationally unrecognized. disbanded 5 April 2016) - Ali Rahman Abou Zekok (2015–2016)
  - Government of National Accord of Libya (Interim government internationally recognized as the sole legitimate government of Libya from 12 March 2016) - Mohamed Taha Siala (2016–2021)
- Madagascar - Béatrice Atallah (2015–2017)
- Malawi -
  1. George Chaponda (2014–2016)
  2. Francis Kasaila (2016–2017)
- Mali - Abdoulaye Diop (2014–2017)
- Mauritania -
  1. Hamadi Ould Meimou (2015–2016)
  2. Isselkou Ould Ahmed Izid Bih (2016–2018)
- Mauritius -
  1. Étienne Sinatambou (2014–2016)
  2. Vishnu Lutchmeenaraidoo (2016–2019)
- Morocco - Salaheddine Mezouar (2013–2017)
- Mozambique - Oldemiro Balói (2008–2017)
- Namibia - Netumbo Nandi-Ndaitwah (2012–present)
- Niger -
  1. Aïchatou Boulama Kané (2015–2016)
  2. Ibrahim Yacouba (2016–2018)
- Nigeria - Geoffrey Onyeama (2015–present)
- Rwanda - Louise Mushikiwabo (2009–2018)
- São Tomé and Príncipe -
  1. Manuel Salvador dos Ramos (2014–2016)
  2. Urbino Botelho (2016–2018)
- Senegal - Mankeur Ndiaye (2012–2017)
- Seychelles -
  1. Joel Morgan (2015–2016)
  2. Danny Faure (2016–2018)
- Sierra Leone - Samura Kamara (2012–2017)
- Somalia - Abdisalam Omer (2015–2017)
- Somaliland -
  1. Mohamed Yonis (2013-2015)
  2. Saad Ali Shire (2015–2018)
- South Africa - Maite Nkoana-Mashabane (2009–2018)
- South Sudan -
  1. Barnaba Marial Benjamin (2013–2016)
  2. Bashir Gbandi (acting) (2016)
  3. Deng Alor (2016–2018)
- Sudan - Ibrahim Ghandour (2015–2018)
- Swaziland – Mgwagwa Gamedze (2013–2018)
- Tanzania - Augustine Mahiga (2015–2019)
- Togo - Robert Dussey (2013–present)
- Tunisia -
  1. Taïeb Baccouche (2015–2016)
  2. Khemaies Jhinaoui (2016–2019)
- Uganda - Sam Kutesa (2005–2021)
- Western Sahara - Mohamed Salem Ould Salek (1998–2023)
- Zambia - Harry Kalaba (2014–2018)
- Zimbabwe - Simbarashe Mumbengegwi (2005–2017)

== Asia ==
- Abkhazia -
  1. Viacheslav Chirikba (2011–2016)
  2. Daur Kove (2016–2021)
- Afghanistan - Salahuddin Rabbani (2015–2019)
- Armenia - Eduard Nalbandyan (2008–2018)
- Azerbaijan - Elmar Mammadyarov (2004–2020)
- Bahrain - Sheikh Khalid ibn Ahmad Al Khalifah (2005–2020)
- Bangladesh - Abul Hassan Mahmud Ali (2014–2019)
- Bhutan - Damcho Dorji (2015-2018)
- Brunei - Hassanal Bolkiah (2015–present)
- Cambodia -
  1. Hor Namhong (1998–2016)
  2. Prak Sokhon (2016–present)
- China (People's Republic of China) - Wang Yi (2013–present)
- East Timor - Hernâni Coelho (2015–2017)
- Georgia - Mikheil Janelidze (2015–2018)
- India - Sushma Swaraj (2014–2019)
- Indonesia - Retno Marsudi (2014–present)
- Iran - Mohammad Javad Zarif (2013–2021)
- Iraq - Ibrahim al-Jaafari (2014–2018)
  - Kurdistan - Falah Mustafa Bakir (2006–2019)
- Israel - Benjamin Netanyahu (2015–2019)
- Japan - Fumio Kishida (2012–2017)
- Jordan - Nasser Judeh (2009–2017)
- Kazakhstan –
  1. Erlan Idrissov (2012–2016)
  2. Kairat Abdrakhmanov (2016–2018)
- North Korea (Democratic People's Republic of Korea) -
  1. Ri Su-yong (2014–2016)
  2. Ri Yong-ho (2016–2020)
- South Korea (Republic of Korea) - Yun Byung-se (2013–2017)
- Kuwait - Sheikh Sabah Al-Khalid Al-Sabah (2011–2019)
- Kyrgyzstan - Erlan Abdyldayev (2012–2018)
- Laos -
  1. Thongloun Sisoulith (2006–2016)
  2. Saleumxay Kommasith (2016–present)
- Lebanon - Gebran Bassil (2014–2020)
- Malaysia - Anifah Aman (2009–2018)
- Maldives -
  1. Dunya Maumoon (2013–2016)
  2. Mohamed Asim (2016–2018)
- Mongolia -
  1. Lundeg Purevsuren (2014–2016)
  2. Tsend Munkh-Orgil (2016–2017)
- Myanmar -
  1. Wunna Maung Lwin (2011–2016)
  2. Aung San Suu Kyi (2016–2021)
- Nagorno-Karabakh - Karen Mirzoyan (2012–2017)
- Nepal -
  1. Kamal Thapa (2015–2016)
  2. Prakash Sharan Mahat (2016–2017)
- Oman - Yusuf bin Alawi bin Abdullah (1982–2020)
- Pakistan - Sartaj Aziz (2013–2017)
- Palestinian National Authority - Riyad al-Maliki (2007–present)
- Philippines -
  1. Albert del Rosario (2011–2016)
  2. Jose Rene Almendras (2016)
  3. Perfecto Yasay, Jr. (2016–2017)
- Qatar -
  1. Khalid bin Mohammad Al Attiyah (2013–2016)
  2. Sheikh Mohammed bin Abdulrahman Al Thani (2016–present)
- Saudi Arabia - Adel al-Jubeir (2015–2018)
- Singapore - Vivian Balakrishnan (2015–present)
- South Ossetia -
  1. Kazbulat Tskhovrebov (2015-2016)
  2. Andreï Tskhovrebov (acting) (2016)
  3. Murat Dzhoiev (2016–2017)
- Sri Lanka - Mangala Samaraweera (2015–2017)
- Syria (Syrian Arab Republic - Walid Muallem (2006–2020)
- Taiwan (Republic of China) -
  1. David Lin (2012–2016)
  2. David Lee (2016–2018)
- Tajikistan - Sirodjidin Aslov (2013–present)
- Thailand - Don Pramudwinai (2015–present)
- Turkey - Mevlüt Çavuşoğlu (2015–present)
- Turkmenistan - Raşit Meredow (2001–present)
- United Arab Emirates - Sheikh Abdullah bin Zayed Al Nahyan (2006–present)
- Uzbekistan - Abdulaziz Komilov (2012–present)
- Vietnam - Phạm Bình Minh (2011–2021)
- Yemen
  - Republic of Yemen - Abdulmalik Al-Mekhlafi (2015–2018)
  - Supreme Revolutionary Committee of Yemen to 14 August 2016 then Supreme Political Council (unrecognised, rival government) -
    1. vacant (2015–2016)
    2. Abu Bakr al-Qirbi (2016)
    3. Hisham Abdullah (2016-present)

== Europe ==
- Albania - Ditmir Bushati (2013–2019)
- Andorra - Gilbert Saboya Sunyé (2011–2017)
- Austria - Sebastian Kurz (2013–2017)
- Belarus - Vladimir Makei (2012–present)
- Belgium - Didier Reynders (2011–2019)
  - Brussels-Capital Region - Guy Vanhengel (2013–2019)
  - Flanders - Geert Bourgeois (2014–2019)
  - Wallonia - Paul Magnette (2014–2017)
- Bosnia and Herzegovina - Igor Crnadak (2015–2019)
- Bulgaria - Daniel Mitov (2014–2017)
- Croatia
  1. Vesna Pusić (2011–2016)
  2. Miro Kovač (2016)
  3. Davor Ivo Stier (2016–2017)
- Cyprus - Ioannis Kasoulidis (2013-2018)
- Czech Republic - Lubomír Zaorálek (2014–2017)
- Denmark -
  1. Kristian Jensen (2015–2016)
  2. Anders Samuelsen (2016–2019)
  - Faroe Islands - Poul Michelsen (2015–2019)
- Donetsk People's Republic -
  1. Alexander Kofman (2014–2016)
  2. Natalya Nikonorova (acting) (2016–present)
- Estonia -
  1. Marina Kaljurand (2015–2016)
  2. Jürgen Ligi (2016)
  3. Sven Mikser (2016–2019)
- Finland - Timo Soini (2015–2019)
- France -
  1. Laurent Fabius (2012–2016)
  2. Jean-Marc Ayrault (2016–2017)
- Germany - Frank-Walter Steinmeier (2013–2017)
- Greece - Nikos Kotzias (2015–2018)
- Guernsey - Jonathan Le Tocq (2016–present)
- Hungary - Péter Szijjártó (2014–present)
- Iceland -
  1. Gunnar Bragi Sveinsson (2013–2016)
  2. Lilja Dögg Alfreðsdóttir (2016–2017)
- Ireland - Charles Flanagan (2014–2017)
- Italy -
  1. Paolo Gentiloni (2014–2016)
  2. Angelino Alfano (2016–2018)
- Jersey - Sir Philip Bailhache (2013–2018)
- Kosovo -
  1. Hashim Thaçi (2014–2016)
  2. Petrit Selimi (acting) (2016)
  3. Enver Hoxhaj (2016–2017)
- Latvia - Edgars Rinkēvičs (2011–2023)
- Liechtenstein - Aurelia Frick (2009–2019)
- Lithuania - Linas Antanas Linkevičius (2012–2020)
- Luxembourg - Jean Asselborn (2004–present)
- Republic of Macedonia - Nikola Poposki (2011–2017)
- Malta - George Vella (2013–2017)
- Moldova -
  1. Natalia Gherman (2013–2016)
  2. Andrei Galbur (2016–2018)
  - Gagauzia - Vitaliy Vlah (2015–present)
- Monaco - Gilles Tonelli (2015–2019)
- Montenegro -
  1. Igor Lukšić (2012–2016)
  2. Milo Đukanović (acting) (2016)
  3. Srđan Darmanović (2016–2020)
- Netherlands - Bert Koenders (2014–2017)
- Northern Cyprus -
  1. Emine Çolak (2015–2016)
  2. Tahsin Ertuğruloğlu (2016–2018)
- Norway - Børge Brende (2013–2017)
- Poland - Witold Waszczykowski (2015–2018)
- Portugal - Augusto Santos Silva (2015–2022)
- Romania - Lazăr Comănescu (2015–2017)
- Russia - Sergey Lavrov (2004–present)
- San Marino -
  1. Pasquale Valentini (2012–2016)
  2. Nicola Renzi (2016–2020)
- Serbia - Ivica Dačić (2014–2020)
- Slovakia - Miroslav Lajčák (2012–2020)
- Slovenia - Karl Erjavec (2012–2018)
- Spain -
  1. José Manuel García-Margallo (2011–2016)
  2. Alfonso Dastis (2016–2018)
  - Catalonia -
    1. Francesc Homs Molist (2012–2016)
    2. Raül Romeva (2016–2017)
- Sweden - Margot Wallström (2014–2019)
- Switzerland - Didier Burkhalter (2012–2017)
- Transnistria - Vitaly Ignatiev (2015–present; acting until 2016)
- Ukraine - Pavlo Klimkin (2014–2019)
- United Kingdom -
  1. Philip Hammond (2014–2016)
  2. Boris Johnson (2016–2018)
  - Scotland - Fiona Hyslop (2009–2020)
- Vatican City - Archbishop Paul Gallagher (2014–present)

== North America and the Caribbean ==
- Antigua and Barbuda - Charles Fernandez (2014–2018)
- The Bahamas - Fred Mitchell (2012–2017)
- Barbados - Maxine McClean (2008–2018)
- Belize - Wilfred Elrington (2008–2020)
- Canada - Stéphane Dion (2015–2017)
  - Quebec - Christine St-Pierre (2014–2018)
- Costa Rica - Manuel González Sanz (2014–2018)
- Cuba - Bruno Rodríguez Parrilla (2009–present)
- Dominica - Francine Baron (2014–2019)
- Dominican Republic -
  1. Andrés Navarro (2014–2016)
  2. Miguel Vargas Maldonado (2016–2020)
- El Salvador - Hugo Martínez (2014–2018)
- Greenland - Vittus Qujaukitsoq (2014–2017)
- Grenada -
  1. Clarice Modeste-Curwen (2014–2016)
  2. Elvin Nimrod (2016–2018)
- Guatemala - Carlos Raúl Morales (2014–2017)
- Haiti -
  1. Lener Renauld (acting) (2015–2016)
  2. Pierrot Delienne (2016–2017)
- Honduras -
  1. Arturo Corrales (2015–2016)
  2. María Dolores Agüero (acting) (2016–2019)
- Jamaica -
  1. Arnold Nicholson (2012–2016)
  2. Kamina Johnson Smith (2016–present)
- Mexico - Claudia Ruiz Massieu (2015–2017)
- Nicaragua - Samuel Santos López (2007–2017)
- Panama - Isabel Saint Malo (2014–2019)
- Puerto Rico – Víctor Suárez Meléndez (2015–2017)
- Saint Kitts and Nevis - Mark Brantley (2015–present)
- Saint Lucia -
  1. Alva Baptiste (2011–2016)
  2. Allen Chastanet (2016–2021)
- Saint Vincent and the Grenadines - Sir Louis Straker (2015–2020)
- Trinidad and Tobago - Dennis Moses (2015–2020)
- United States - John Kerry (2013–2017)

== Oceania ==
- Australia - Julie Bishop (2013–2018)
- Cook Islands - Henry Puna (2013–2020)
- Fiji -
  1. Ratu Inoke Kubuabola (2009–2016)
  2. Frank Bainimarama (2016–2019)
- French Polynesia - Édouard Fritch (2014–present)
- Kiribati -
  1. Anote Tong (2003–2016)
  2. Taneti Mamau (2016–present)
- Marshall Islands -
  1. Tony deBrum (2014–2016)
  2. Kessai Note (2016)
  3. John Silk (2016–2020)
- Micronesia - Lorin S. Robert (2007–2019)
- Nauru - Baron Waqa (2013–2019)
- New Zealand - Murray McCully (2008–2017)
- Niue - Toke Talagi (2008–2020)
- Palau - Billy Kuartei (2013–2017)
- Papua New Guinea - Rimbink Pato (2012–2019)
- Samoa - Tuilaepa Aiono Sailele Malielegaoi (1998–2021)
- Solomon Islands - Milner Tozaka (2014–2019)
- Tokelau -
  1. Siopili Perez (2015–2016)
  2. Afega Gaualofa (2016–2017)
- Tonga - ʻAkilisi Pōhiva (2014–2017)
- Tuvalu - Taukelina Finikaso (2013–2019)
- Vanuatu -
  1. Havo Moli (2015–2016)
  2. Bruno Leingkone (2016-2016)

== South America ==
- Argentina - Susana Malcorra (2015–2017)
- Bolivia - David Choquehuanca (2006–2017)
- Brazil -
  1. Mauro Vieira (2015–2016)
  2. José Serra (2016–2017)
- Chile - Heraldo Muñoz (2014–2018)
- Colombia - María Ángela Holguín (2010–2018)
- Ecuador -
  1. Ricardo Patiño (2010–2016)
  2. Guillaume Long (2016–2017)
- Guyana - Carl Greenidge (2015–2019)
- Paraguay - Eladio Loizaga (2013–2018)
- Peru -
  1. Ana María Sánchez (2015–2016)
  2. Ricardo Luna (2016–2018)
- Suriname - Niermala Badrising (2015–2017)
- Uruguay - Rodolfo Nin Novoa (2015–2020)
- Venezuela - Delcy Rodríguez (2014–2017)
