= List of foreign ministers in 2015 =

This is a list of foreign ministers in 2015.

== Africa ==
- Algeria - Ramtane Lamamra (2013–2017)
- Angola - Georges Rebelo Chicoti (2010–2017)
- Benin
  1. Nassirou Bako Arifari (2011–2015)
  2. Saliou Akadiri (2015–2016)
- Botswana - Pelonomi Venson-Moitoi (2014–2018)
- Burkina Faso
  1. Michel Kafando (2014–2015)
  2. Moussa Nébié (2015–2016)
- Burundi
  1. Laurent Kavakure (2011–2015)
  2. Alain Aimé Nyamitwe (2015–2018)
- Cameroon
  1. Pierre Moukoko Mbonjo (2011–2015)
  2. Lejeune Mbella Mbella (2015–present)
- Cape Verde - Jorge Tolentino (2014–2016)
- Central African Republic
  1. Toussaint Kongo Doudou (2014–2015)
  2. Samuel Rangba (2015–2016)
- Chad - Moussa Faki (2008–2017)
- Comoros
  1. El-Anrif Said Hassane (2013–2015)
  2. Abdoulkarim Mohamed (2015–present)
- Republic of Congo
  1. Basile Ikouébé (2007–2015)
  2. Jean-Claude Gakosso (2015–present)
- Democratic Republic of Congo - Raymond Tshibanda (2012–2016)
- Côte d'Ivoire - Charles Koffi Diby (2012–2016)
- Djibouti - Mahamoud Ali Youssouf (2005–present)
- Egypt - Sameh Shoukry (2014–present)
- Equatorial Guinea - Agapito Mba Mokuy (2012–2018)
- Eritrea - Osman Saleh Mohammed (2007–present)
- Ethiopia - Tedros Adhanom (2012–2016)
- Gabon - Emmanuel Issoze-Ngondet (2012–2016)
- The Gambia
  1. Bala Garba Jahumpa (2014–2015)
  2. Neneh MacDouall-Gaye (2015–2017)
- Ghana - Hanna Tetteh (2013–2017)
- Guinea - François Lonseny Fall (2012–2016)
- Guinea-Bissau -
  1. Mário Lopes da Rosa (2014–2015)
  2. Rui Dia de Sousa (2015)
  3. Artur Silva (2015–2016)
- Kenya - Amina Mohamed (2013–2018)
- Lesotho
  1. Mohlabi Tsekoa (2007–2015)
  2. Tlohang Sekhamane (2015–2016)
- Liberia -
  1. Augustine Kpehe Ngafuan (2012–2015)
  2. Elias Shoniyin (acting) (2015–2016)
- Libya - disputed
  - Mohammed al-Dairi (2014–2019) or
    1. Mohamed al-Ghariani (2014–2015)
    2. Ali Ramadan Abou Zekok (2015–2016)
- Madagascar -
  1. Arisoa Razafitrimo (2014–2015)
  2. Béatrice Atallah (2015–2017)
- Malawi - George Chaponda (2014–2016)
- Mali - Abdoulaye Diop (2014–2017)
- Mauritania -
  1. Ahmed Ould Teguedi (2013–2015)
  2. Vatma Vall Mint Soueina (2015)
  3. Hamadi Ould Meimou (2015–2016)
- Mauritius - Étienne Sinatambou (2014–2016)
- Morocco - Salaheddine Mezouar (2013–2017)
  - Western Sahara - Mohamed Salem Ould Salek (1998–2023)
- Mozambique - Oldemiro Balói (2008–2017)
- Namibia - Netumbo Nandi-Ndaitwah (2012–present)
- Niger
  1. Mohamed Bazoum (2011–2015)
  2. Aïchatou Boulama Kané (2015–2016)
- Nigeria
  1. Aminu Wali (2014–2015)
  2. Geoffrey Onyeama (2015–present)
- Rwanda - Louise Mushikiwabo (2009–2018)
- São Tomé and Príncipe - Manuel Salvador dos Ramos (2014–2016)
- Senegal - Mankeur Ndiaye (2012–2017)
- Seychelles -
  1. Jean-Paul Adam (2010–2015)
  2. Joel Morgan (2015–2016)
- Sierra Leone - Samura Kamara (2012–2017)
- Somalia -
  1. Abdirahman Duale Beyle (2014–2015)
  2. Abdisalam Omer (2015–2017)
  - Somaliland -
  1. Mohamed Yonis (2013–2015)
  2. Saad Ali Shire (2015–present)
  - Puntland - Ali Ahmed Faatah (2014–present)
- South Africa - Maite Nkoana-Mashabane (2009–2018)
- South Sudan - Barnaba Marial Benjamin (2013–2016)
- Sudan -
  1. Ali Karti (2010–2015)
  2. Ibrahim Ghandour (2015–2018)
- Swaziland – Mgwagwa Gamedze (2013–2018)
- Tanzania
  1. Bernard Membe (2007–2015)
  2. Augustine Mahiga (2015–2019)
- Togo - Robert Dussey (2013–present)
- Tunisia -
  1. Mongi Hamdi (2014–2015)
  2. Taïeb Baccouche (2015–2016)
- Uganda - Sam Kutesa (2005–2021)
- Zambia - Harry Kalaba (2014–2018)
- Zimbabwe - Simbarashe Mumbengegwi (2005–2017)

== Asia ==
- Afghanistan -
  1. Atiqullah Atifmal (acting) (2014–2015)
  2. Salahuddin Rabbani (2015–2019)
- Armenia - Eduard Nalbandyan (2008–2018)
- Azerbaijan - Elmar Mammadyarov (2004–2020)
  - Nagorno-Karabakh - Karen Mirzoyan (2012–2017)
- Bahrain - Sheikh Khalid ibn Ahmad Al Khalifah (2005–2020)
- Bangladesh - Abul Hassan Mahmud Ali (2014–2019)
- Bhutan -
  1. Rinzin Dorje (2013–2015)
  2. Damcho Dorji (2015-2018)
- Brunei -
  1. Pengiran Muda Mohamed Bolkiah (1984–2015)
  2. Hassanal Bolkiah (2015–present)
- Cambodia - Hor Namhong (1998–2016)
- China - Wang Yi (2013–present)
- East Timor -
  1. José Luís Guterres (2012–2015)
  2. Hernâni Coelho (2015–2017)
- Georgia
  1. Tamar Beruchashvili (2014–2015)
  2. Giorgi Kvirikashvili (2015)
  3. Mikheil Janelidze (2015–2018)
  - Abkhazia - Viacheslav Chirikba (2011–2016)
  - South Ossetia -
    1. David Sanakoyev (2012–2015)
    2. Kazbulat Tskhovrebov (2015–2016)
- India - Sushma Swaraj (2014-2019)
- Indonesia - Retno Marsudi (2014–present)
- Iran - Mohammad Javad Zarif (2013–2021)
- Iraq - Ibrahim al-Jaafari (2014–2018)
  - Kurdistan - Falah Mustafa Bakir (2006–2019)
- Israel
  1. Avigdor Lieberman (2013–2015)
  2. Benjamin Netanyahu (2015–2019)
  - Palestinian Authority - Riyad al-Maliki (2007–present)
- Japan - Fumio Kishida (2012–2017)
- Jordan - Nasser Judeh (2009–2017)
- Kazakhstan – Erlan Idrissov (2012–2016)
- North Korea - Ri Su-yong (2014–2016)
- South Korea - Yun Byung-se (2013–2017)
- Kuwait - Sheikh Sabah Al-Khalid Al-Sabah (2011–2019)
- Kyrgyzstan - Erlan Abdyldayev (2012–2018)
- Laos - Thongloun Sisoulith (2006–2016)
- Lebanon - Gebran Bassil (2014–2020)
- Malaysia - Anifah Aman (2009–2018)
- Maldives - Dunya Maumoon (2013–2016)
- Mongolia - Lundeg Purevsuren (2014–2016)
- Myanmar - Wunna Maung Lwin (2011–2016)
- Nepal
  1. Mahendra Pandey (2014–2015)
  2. Kamal Thapa (2015–2016)
- Oman - Yusuf bin Alawi bin Abdullah (1982–2020)
- Pakistan - Sartaj Aziz (2013–2017)
- Philippines - Albert del Rosario (2011–2016)
- Qatar - Khalid bin Mohammad Al Attiyah (2013–2016)
- Saudi Arabia
  1. Prince Saud bin Faisal bin Abdulaziz Al Saud (1975–2015)
  2. Adel al-Jubeir (2015–2018)
- Singapore
  1. K. Shanmugam (2011–2015)
  2. Vivian Balakrishnan (2015–present)
- Sri Lanka
  1. G. L. Peiris (2010–2015)
  2. Mangala Samaraweera (2015–2017)
- Syria - Walid Muallem (2006–2020)
- Taiwan - David Lin (2012–2016)
- Tajikistan - Sirodjidin Aslov (2013–present)
- Thailand -
  1. Thanasak Patimaprakorn (2014–2015)
  2. Don Pramudwinai (2015–2023)
- Turkey
  1. Mevlüt Çavuşoğlu (2014–2015)
  2. Feridun Sinirlioğlu (2015)
  3. Mevlüt Çavuşoğlu (2015–present)
- Turkmenistan - Raşit Meredow (2001–present)
- United Arab Emirates - Sheikh Abdullah bin Zayed Al Nahyan (2006–present)
- Uzbekistan - Abdulaziz Komilov (2012–present)
- Vietnam - Phạm Bình Minh (2011–2021)
- Yemen
  1. Abdullah al-Saidi (2014–2015)
  2. disputed -
    - Vacant (2015) or
    - 1. Riyadh Yassin (2015)
    - 2. Abdulmalik Al-Mekhlafi (2015–2018)

== Europe ==
- Albania - Ditmir Bushati (2013–2019)
- Andorra - Gilbert Saboya Sunyé (2011–2017)
- Austria - Sebastian Kurz (2013–2017)
- Belarus - Vladimir Makei (2012–present)
- Belgium - Didier Reynders (2011–2019)
  - Brussels-Capital Region - Guy Vanhengel (2013–2019)
  - Flanders - Geert Bourgeois (2014–2019)
  - Wallonia - Paul Magnette (2014–2017)
- Bosnia and Herzegovina
  1. Zlatko Lagumdžija (2012–2015)
  2. Igor Crnadak (2015–2019)
- Bulgaria - Daniel Mitov (2014–2017)
- Croatia - Vesna Pusić (2011–2016)
- Cyprus - Ioannis Kasoulidis (2013–2018)
  - Northern Cyprus
    1. Özdil Nami (2013–2015)
    2. Emine Çolak (2015–2016)
- Czech Republic - Lubomír Zaorálek (2014–2017)
- Denmark
  1. Martin Lidegaard (2014–2015)
  2. Kristian Jensen (2015–2016)
  - Greenland - Vittus Qujaukitsoq (2014–2017)
  - Faroe Islands -
    1. Kaj Leo Johannesen (2011–2015)
    2. Poul Michelsen (2015–2019)
- Estonia
  1. Keit Pentus-Rosimannus (2014–2015)
  2. Jürgen Ligi (acting) (2015)
  3. Marina Kaljurand (2015–2016)
- Finland
  1. Erkki Tuomioja (2011–2015)
  2. Timo Soini (2015–2019)
- France - Laurent Fabius (2012–2016)
- Germany - Frank-Walter Steinmeier (2013–2017)
- Greece -
  1. Evangelos Venizelos (2013–2015)
  2. Nikos Kotzias (2015)
  3. Petros Molyviatis (2015)
  4. Nikos Kotzias (2015–2018)
- Hungary - Péter Szijjártó (2014–present)
- Iceland - Gunnar Bragi Sveinsson (2013–2016)
- Ireland - Charles Flanagan (2014–2017)
- Italy - Paolo Gentiloni (2014–2016)
- Latvia - Edgars Rinkēvičs (2011–2023)
- Liechtenstein - Aurelia Frick (2009–2019)
- Lithuania - Linas Antanas Linkevičius (2012–2020)
- Luxembourg - Jean Asselborn (2004–present)
- Republic of Macedonia - Nikola Poposki (2011–2017)
- Malta - George Vella (2013–2017)
- Moldova - Natalia Gherman (2013–2016)
  - Transnistria
    1. Nina Shtanski (2012–2015)
    2. Vitaly Ignatiev (acting; 2015–present)
  - Gagauzia -
    1. Svetlana Gradinari (2013-2015)
    2. Vitaliy Vlah (2015-present)
- Monaco
  1. José Badia (2011–2015)
  2. Gilles Tonelli (2015–2019)
- Montenegro - Igor Lukšić (2012–2016)
- Netherlands - Bert Koenders (2014–2017)
- Norway - Børge Brende (2013–2017)
- Poland
  1. Grzegorz Schetyna (2014–2015)
  2. Witold Waszczykowski (2015–2018)
- Portugal
  1. Rui Machete (2013–2015)
  2. Augusto Santos Silva (2015–2022)
- Romania
  1. Bogdan Aurescu (2014–2015)
  2. Lazăr Comănescu (2015–2017)
- Russia - Sergey Lavrov (2004–present)
- San Marino - Pasquale Valentini (2012–2016)
- Serbia - Ivica Dačić (2014–2020)
  - Kosovo - Hashim Thaçi (2014–2016)
- Slovakia - Miroslav Lajčák (2012–2020)
- Slovenia - Karl Erjavec (2012–2018)
- Spain - José Manuel García-Margallo (2011–2016)
  - Catalonia - Francesc Homs Molist (2012–2015)
- Sweden - Margot Wallström (2014–2019)
- Switzerland - Didier Burkhalter (2012–2017)
- Ukraine - Pavlo Klimkin (2014–2019)
- United Kingdom - Philip Hammond (2014–2016)
  - Scotland - Fiona Hyslop (2009–2020)
  - Jersey - Sir Philip Bailhache (2013–2018)
- Vatican City - Archbishop Paul Gallagher (2014–present)

== North America and the Caribbean ==
- Antigua and Barbuda - Charles Fernandez (2014–2018)
- The Bahamas - Fred Mitchell (2012–2017)
- Barbados - Maxine McClean (2008–2018)
- Belize - Wilfred Elrington (2008–2020)
- Canada -
  1. John Baird (2011–2015)
  2. Ed Fast (acting) (2015)
  3. Rob Nicholson (2015)
  4. Stéphane Dion (2015–2017)
  - Quebec - Christine St-Pierre (2014–2018)
- Costa Rica - Manuel González Sanz (2014–2018)
- Cuba - Bruno Rodríguez Parrilla (2009–present)
- Dominica - Francine Baron (2014–2019)
- Dominican Republic - Andrés Navarro (2014–2016)
- El Salvador - Hugo Martínez (2014–2018)
- Grenada - Clarice Modeste-Curwen (2014–2016)
- Guatemala - Carlos Raúl Morales (2014–2017)
- Haiti -
  1. Duly Brutus (2014–2015)
  2. Lener Renauld (acting) (2015–2016)
- Honduras -
  1. Mireya Agüero (2013–2015)
  2. Arturo Corrales (2015–2016)
- Jamaica - Arnold Nicholson (2012–2016)
- Mexico
  1. José Antonio Meade Kuribreña (2012–2015)
  2. Claudia Ruiz Massieu (2015–2017)
- Nicaragua - Samuel Santos López (2007–2017)
- Panama - Isabel Saint Malo (2014–2019)
- Puerto Rico –
  1. David Bernier (2013–2015)
  2. Javier González (acting) (2015)
  3. Víctor Suárez Meléndez (2015–2017)
- Saint Kitts and Nevis -
  1. Patrice Nisbett (2013–2015)
  2. Mark Brantley (2015–present)
- Saint Lucia - Alva Baptiste (2011–2016)
- Saint Vincent and the Grenadines
  1. Camillo Gonsalves (2013–2015)
  2. Sir Louis Straker (2015–2020)
- Trinidad and Tobago
  1. Winston Dookeran (2012–2015)
  2. Dennis Moses (2015–2020)
- United States of America - John Kerry (2013–2017)

== Oceania ==
- Australia - Julie Bishop (2013–2018)
- Fiji - Ratu Inoke Kubuabola (2009–2016)
- French Polynesia - Édouard Fritch (2014–present)
- Kiribati - Anote Tong (2003–2016)
- Marshall Islands - Tony deBrum (2014–2016)
- Micronesia - Lorin S. Robert (2007–2019)
- Nauru - Baron Waqa (2013–2019)
- New Zealand - Murray McCully (2008–2017)
  - Cook Islands - Henry Puna (2013–2020)
  - Niue - Toke Talagi (2008–2020)
  - Tokelau
    1. Kuresa Nasau (2014–2015)
    2. Siopili Perez (2015–2016)
- Palau - Billy Kuartei (2013–2017)
- Papua New Guinea - Rimbink Pato (2012–2019)
- Samoa - Tuilaepa Aiono Sailele Malielegaoi (1998–2021)
- Solomon Islands - Milner Tozaka (2014–2019)
- Tonga - ʻAkilisi Pōhiva (2014–2017)
- Tuvalu - Taukelina Finikaso (2013–2019)
- Vanuatu
  1. Sato Kilman (2014–2015)
  2. Kalvau Moli (2015)
  3. Serge Vohor (2015)
  4. Havo Moli (2015–2016)

== South America ==
- Argentina
  1. Héctor Timerman (2010–2015)
  2. Susana Malcorra (2015–2017)
- Bolivia - David Choquehuanca (2006–2017)
- Brazil -
  1. Luiz Alberto Figueiredo (2013–2015)
  2. Mauro Vieira (2015–2016)
- Chile - Heraldo Muñoz (2014–2018)
- Colombia - María Ángela Holguín (2010–2018)
- Ecuador - Ricardo Patiño (2010–2016)
- Guyana -
  1. Carolyn Rodrigues (2008–2015)
  2. Carl Greenidge (2015–2019)
- Paraguay - Eladio Loizaga (2013–2018)
- Peru
  1. Gonzalo Gutiérrez Reinel (2014–2015)
  2. Ana María Sánchez (2015–2016)
- Suriname
  1. Winston Lackin (2010–2015)
  2. Niermala Badrising (2015–2017)
- Uruguay -
  1. Luis Almagro (2010–2015)
  2. Rodolfo Nin Novoa (2015–2020)
- Venezuela - Delcy Rodríguez (2014–2017)
