= List of foreign ministers in 2019 =

This is a list of foreign ministers in 2019.

== Africa ==
- Algeria –
  1. Abdelkader Messahel (2017–2019)
  2. Ramtane Lamamra (2019)
  3. Sabri Boukadoum (2019–2021)
- Angola – Manuel Domingos Augusto (2017–2020)
- Benin – Aurélien Agbénonci (2016–present)
- Botswana – Unity Dow (2018–2020)
- Burkina Faso – Alpha Barry (2016–2021)
- Burundi – Ezéchiel Nibigira (2018–2020)
- Cameroon- Lejeune Mbella Mbella (2015–present)
- Cape Verde – Luís Felipe Tavares (2016–2021)
- Central African Republic – Sylvie Baïpo-Temon (2018–present)
- Chad – Mahamat Zene Cherif (2017–2020)
- Comoros – Mohamed El-Amine Souef (2017–2020)
- Congo–Brazzaville (Republic of the Congo) – Jean-Claude Gakosso (2015–present)
- Congo–Kinshasa (Democratic Republic of the Congo) –
  1. Léonard She Okitundu (2016–2019)
  2. Alexis Thambwe Mwamba (acting) (2019)
  3. Franck Mwe di Malila (acting) (2019)
  4. Marie Tumba Nzeza (2019–2021)
- Djibouti – Mahamoud Ali Youssouf (2005–present)
- Egypt – Sameh Shoukry (2014–present)
- Equatorial Guinea – Simeón Oyono Esono Angue (2018–present)
- Eritrea – Osman Saleh Mohammed (2007–present)
- Ethiopia –
  1. Workneh Gebeyehu (2016–2019)
  2. Gedu Andargachew (2019–2020)
- Gabon –
  1. Régis Immongault Tatangani (2018–2019)
  2. Abdu Razzaq Guy Kambogo (2019)
  3. Alain Claude Bilie-By-Nze (2019–2020)
- The Gambia – Mamadou Tangara (2018–present)
- Ghana – Shirley Ayorkor Botchway (2017–present)
- Guinea – Mamadi Touré (2017–2021)
- Guinea-Bissau –
  1. João Ribeiro Butiam Có (2018–2019)
  2. Suzi Barbosa (2019–2020)
  3. Aristides Ocante da Silva (2019)
- Ivory Coast (Côte d'Ivoire) – Marcel Amon Tanoh (acting to 2017) (2016–2020)
- Kenya – Monica Juma (2018–2020)
- Lesotho – Lesego Makgothi (2017–2020
- Liberia – Gbehzohngar Findley (2018–2020)
- Libya
  - Government of House of Representatives of Libya (Government of Libya internationally recognized to 2016) –
    1. Mohammed al-Dairi (2014–2019)
    2. Abdulhadi Elhweg (2019–2021)
  - Government of National Accord of Libya (Interim government internationally recognized as the sole legitimate government of Libya from 2016) – Mohamed Taha Siala (2016–2021)
- Madagascar –
  1. Eloi Maxime Alphonse (2018–2019)
  2. Naina Andriantsitohaina (2019–2020)
- Malawi –
  - Emmanuel Fabiano (2017–2019)
  - Peter Mutharika (2019)
  - Francis Kasaila (2019–2020)
- Mali –
  1. Kamissa Camara (2018–2019)
  2. Tiébilé Dramé (2019–2020)
- Mauritania – Ismail Ould Cheikh Ahmed (2018–present)
- Mauritius –
  1. Vishnu Lutchmeenaraidoo (2016–2019)
  2. Nando Bodha (2019–2021)
- Morocco – Nasser Bourita (2017–present)
- Mozambique – José Condungua Pacheco (2017–2020)
- Namibia – Netumbo Nandi-Ndaitwah (2012–present)
- Niger – Kalla Ankourao (2018–2020)
- Nigeria – Geoffrey Onyeama (2015–present)
- Rwanda –
  1. Richard Sezibera (2018–2019)
  2. Vincent Biruta (2019–present)
- São Tomé and Príncipe – Elsa Teixeira Pinto (2018–2020)
- Senegal –
  1. Sidiki Kaba (2017–2019)
  2. Amadou Ba (2019–2020)
- Seychelles – Vincent Meriton (2018–2020)
- Sierra Leone –
  1. Alie Kabba (2018–2019)
  2. Nabeela Tunis (2019–2021)
- Somalia – Ahmed Isse Awad (2018–2020)
- Somaliland – Yasin Haji Mohamoud (2018–present)
- South Africa –
  1. Lindiwe Sisulu (2018–2019)
  2. Naledi Pandor (2019–present)
- South Sudan –
  1. Nhial Deng Nhial (2018–2019)
  2. Awut Deng Acuil (2019–2020)
- Sudan –
  1. al-Dirdiri Mohamed Ahmed (2018–2019)
  2. Asma Mohamed Abdalla (2019–2020)
- Swaziland – Thuli Dladla (2018–present)
- Tanzania –
  1. Augustine Mahiga (2015–2019)
  2. Palamagamba John Aidan Mwaluko Kabudi (2019-2021)
- Togo – Robert Dussey (2013–present)
- Tunisia –
  1. Khemaies Jhinaoui (2016–2019)
  2. Sabri Bachtabji (acting) (2019–2020)
- Uganda – Sam Kutesa (2005–2021)
- Western Sahara – Mohamed Salem Ould Salek (1998–2023)
- Zambia – Joe Malanji (2018–2021)
- Zimbabwe – Sibusiso Moyo (2017–2021)

== Asia ==
- Abkhazia – Daur Kove (2016–2021)
- Afghanistan –
  1. Salahuddin Rabbani (2015–2019)
  2. Idrees Zaman (acting) (2019–2020)
- Armenia – Zohrab Mnatsakanian (2018–2020)
- Artsakh – Masis Mayilyan (2017–2021)
- Azerbaijan – Elmar Mammadyarov (2004–2020)
- Bahrain – Sheikh Khalid ibn Ahmad Al Khalifah (2005–2020)
- Bangladesh –
  1. Abul Hassan Mahmud Ali (2014–2019)
  2. Abulkalam Abdul Momen (2019–present)
- Bhutan – Tandi Dorji (2018–present)
- Brunei – Hassanal Bolkiah (2015–present)
- Cambodia – Prak Sokhon (2016–present)
- China (People's Republic of China) – Wang Yi (2013–present)
- East Timor – Dionísio Babo Soares (2018–2020)
- Georgia – Davit Zalkaliani (2018–present)
- India –
  1. Sushma Swaraj (2014–2019)
  2. Subrahmanyam Jaishankar (2019–present)
- Indonesia – Retno Marsudi (2014–present)
- Iran – Mohammad Javad Zarif (2013–2021)
- Iraq – Mohamed Ali Alhakim (2018–2020)
  - Kurdistan –
    1. Falah Mustafa Bakir (2006–2019)
    2. Safeen Muhsin Dizayee (2019–present)
- Israel –
  1. Benjamin Netanyahu (2015–2019)
  2. Yisrael Katz (2019–2020)
- Japan –
  1. Tarō Kōno (2017–2019)
  2. Toshimitsu Motegi (2019–2021)
- Jordan – Ayman Safadi (2017–present)
- Kazakhstan –
  1. Beibut Atamkulov (2018–2019)
  2. Mukhtar Tleuberdi (2019–present)
- North Korea (Democratic People's Republic of Korea) – Ri Yong-ho (2016–2020)
- South Korea (Republic of Korea) – Kang Kyung-wha (2017–2021)
- Kuwait –
  1. Sheikh Sabah Al-Khalid Al-Sabah (2011–2019)
  2. Sheikh Ahmad Nasser Al Muhammad Al Sabah (2019–present)
- Kyrgyzstan – Chingiz Aidarbekov (2018–2020)
- Laos – Saleumxay Kommasith (2016–present)
- Lebanon – Gebran Bassil (2014–2020)
- Malaysia – Saifuddin Abdullah (2018–2020)
- Maldives – Abdulla Shahid (2018–present)
- Mongolia – Damdin Tsogtbaatar (2017–2020)
- Myanmar – Aung San Suu Kyi (2016–2021)
- Nepal – Pradeep Gyawali (2018–2021)
- Oman – Yusuf bin Alawi bin Abdullah (1982–2020)
- Pakistan – Shah Mehmood Qureshi (2018–present)
- Palestine – Riyad al-Maliki (2007–present)
- Philippines – Teodoro Locsin Jr. (2018–2022)
- Qatar – Sheikh Mohammed bin Abdulrahman Al Thani (2016–present)
- Saudi Arabia –
  1. Ibrahim Abdulaziz Al-Assaf (2018–2019)
  2. Prince Faisal bin Farhan Al Saud (2019–present)
- Singapore – Vivian Balakrishnan (2015–present)
- South Ossetia – Dmitry Medoyev (2017–present)
- Sri Lanka –
  1. Tilak Marapana (2018–2019)
  2. Dinesh Gunawardena (2019–2021)
- Syria (Syrian Arab Republic) – Walid Muallem (2006–2020)
- Taiwan (Republic of China) – Joseph Wu (2018–present)
- Tajikistan – Sirodjidin Aslov (2013–present)
- Thailand – Don Pramudwinai (2015–present)
- Turkey – Mevlüt Çavuşoğlu (2015–present)
- Turkmenistan – Raşit Meredow (2001–present)
- United Arab Emirates – Sheikh Abdullah bin Zayed Al Nahyan (2006–present)
- Uzbekistan – Abdulaziz Komilov (2012–present)
- Vietnam – Phạm Bình Minh (2011–2021)
- Yemen
  - Republic of Yemen –
    1. Khaled al-Yamani (2018–2019)
    2. Mohammed A. Al-Hadhramii (2019–2020)
  - Supreme Political Council (unrecognised, rival government) – Hisham Abdullah (2016–present)

== Europe ==
- Albania –
  1. Ditmir Bushati (2013–2019)
  2. Edi Rama (2019–2020)
- Andorra – Maria Ubach i Font (2017–present)
- Austria –
  1. Karin Kneissl (2017–2019)
  2. Alexander Schallenberg (2019–2021)
- Belarus – Vladimir Makei (2012–present)
- Belgium –
  1. Didier Reynders (2011–2019)
  2. Philippe Goffin (2019–2020)
  - Brussels -
    1. Guy Vanhengel (2013–2019)
    2. Pascal Smet (2019–present)
  - Flanders -
    1. Geert Bourgeois (2014–2019)
    2. Ben Weyts (2019)
    3. Jan Jambon (2019–present)
  - Wallonia -
    1. Willy Borsus (2017–2019)
    2. Elio Di Rupo (2019–present)
- Bosnia and Herzegovina –
  1. Igor Crnadak (2015–2019)
  2. Bisera Turković (2019–2023)
- Bulgaria – Ekaterina Zakharieva (2017–2021)
- Croatia –
  1. Marija Pejčinović Burić (2017–2019)
  2. Gordan Grlić-Radman (2019–present)
- Cyprus – Nikos Christodoulides (2018–2022)
- Czech Republic – Tomáš Petříček (2018–2021)
- Denmark –
  1. Anders Samuelsen (2016–2019)
  2. Jeppe Kofod (2019–present)
  - Faroe Islands –
    1. Poul Michelsen (2015–2019)
    2. Jenis av Rana (2019–present)
- Donetsk People's Republic – Natalya Nikonorova (2016–present)
- Estonia –
  1. Sven Mikser (2016–2019)
  2. Urmas Reinsalu (2019–2021)
- Finland –
  1. Timo Soini (2015–2019)
  2. Pekka Haavisto (2019–present)
- France – Jean-Yves Le Drian (2017–present)
- Germany – Heiko Maas (2018–2021)
- Greece –
  1. Alexis Tsipras (2018–2019)
  2. Georgios Katrougalos (2019)
  3. Nikos Dendias (2019–present)
- Guernsey – Jonathan Le Tocq (2016–present)
- Hungary – Péter Szijjártó (2014–present)
- Iceland – Guðlaugur Þór Þórðarson (2017–2021)
- Ireland – Simon Coveney (2017–present)
- Italy –
  1. Enzo Moavero Milanesi (2018–2019)
  2. Luigi Di Maio (2019–present)
- Jersey – Ian Gorst (2018–present)
- Kosovo – Behgjet Pacolli (2017–2020)
- Latvia – Edgars Rinkēvičs (2011–2023)
- Liechtenstein –
  1. Aurelia Frick (2009–2019)
  2. Mauro Pedrazzini (acting) (2019)
  3. Katrin Eggenberger (2019–present)
- Lithuania – Linas Antanas Linkevičius (2012–2020)
- Lugansk People's Republic – Vladislav Deinevo (2017–present)
- Luxembourg – Jean Asselborn (2004–present)
- Malta – Carmelo Abela (2017–2020)
- Moldova –
  1. Tudor Ulianovschi (2018–2019)
  2. Nicu Popescu (2019)
  3. Aureliu Ciocoi (2019–2020)
  - Gagauzia – Vitaliy Vlah (2015–present)
- Monaco –
  1. Gilles Tonelli (2015–2019)
  2. Laurent Anselmi (2019–2022)
- Montenegro – Srđan Darmanović (2016–2020)
- Netherlands – Stef Blok (2018–2021)
- North Macedonia – Nikola Dimitrov (2017–2020)
- Northern Cyprus – Kudret Özersay (2018–2020)
- Norway – Ine Marie Eriksen Søreide (2017–2021)
- Poland – Jacek Czaputowicz (2018–2020)
- Portugal – Augusto Santos Silva (2015–present)
- Romania –
  1. Teodor Meleșcanu (2017–2019)
  2. Ramona Mănescu (2019)
  3. Bogdan Aurescu (2019–present)
- Russia – Sergey Lavrov (2004–present)
- San Marino – Nicola Renzi (2016–present)
- Serbia – Ivica Dačić (2014–2020)
- Slovakia – Miroslav Lajčák (2012–2020)
- Slovenia – Miro Cerar (2018–2020)
- Spain –
  1. Josep Borrell (2018–2019)
  2. Margarita Robles (interim) (2019–2020)
  - Catalonia – Alfred Bosch (2018–2020)
- Sweden –
  1. Margot Wallström (2014–2019)
  2. Ann Linde (2019–present)
- Switzerland – Ignazio Cassis (2017–present)
- Transnistria – Vitaly Ignatiev (2015–present)
- Ukraine –
  1. Pavlo Klimkin (2014–2019)
  2. Vadym Prystaiko (2019–2020)
- United Kingdom -
  1. Jeremy Hunt (2018–2019)
  2. Dominic Raab (2019–2021)
  - Scotland – Fiona Hyslop (2009–2020)
- Vatican City – Archbishop Paul Gallagher (2014–present)

== North America and the Caribbean ==
- Antigua and Barbuda – E.P. Chet Greene (2018–present)
- The Bahamas – Darren Henfield (2017–2021)
- Barbados – Jerome Walcott (2018–present)
- Belize – Wilfred Elrington (2008–2020)
- Canada –
  1. Chrystia Freeland (2017–2019)
  2. François-Philippe Champagne (2019–2021)
  - Quebec – Nadine Girault (2018–present)
- Costa Rica –
  1. Lorena Aguilar Revelo (acting) (2018–2019)
  2. Manuel Ventura (2019–2020)
- Cuba – Bruno Rodríguez Parrilla (2009–present)
- Dominica –
  1. Francine Baron (2014–2019)
  2. Kenneth Darroux (2019–present)
- Dominican Republic – Miguel Vargas Maldonado (2016–2020)
- El Salvador –
  1. Carlos Alfredo Castaneda (2018–2019)
  2. Alexandra Hill Tinoco (2019–present)
- Greenland – Ane Lone Bagger (2018–2020)
- Grenada – Peter David (2018–2020)
- Guatemala – Sandra Jovel (2017–2020)
- Haiti – Bocchit Edmond (2018–2020)
- Honduras –
  1. María Dolores Agüero (2016–2019)
  2. Lisandro Rosales (2019–2022)
- Jamaica – Kamina Johnson-Smith (2016–present)
- Mexico – Marcelo Ebrard (2018–present)
- Nicaragua –Denis Moncada (2017–present)
- Panama –
  1. Isabel Saint Malo (2014–2019)
  2. Alejandro Ferrer López (2019–2020)
- Puerto Rico –
  1. Luis G. Rivera Marín (2017–2019)
  2. Pedro Pierluisi (acting) (2019)
  3. Elmer Román (2019–2020)
- Saint Kitts and Nevis – Mark Brantley (2015–present)
- Saint Lucia – Allen Chastanet (2016–2021)
- Saint Vincent and the Grenadines – Sir Louis Straker (2015–2020)
- Trinidad and Tobago – Dennis Moses (2015–2020)
- United States – Mike Pompeo (2018–2021)

== Oceania ==
- Australia – Marise Payne (2018–present)
- Cook Islands – Henry Puna (2013–2020)
- Fiji –
  1. Frank Bainimarama (2016–2019)
  2. Inia Seruiratu (2019–2020)
- French Polynesia – Édouard Fritch (2014–present)
- Kiribati – Taneti Mamau (2016–present)
- Marshall Islands – John Silk (2016–2020)
- Micronesia –
  1. Lorin S. Robert (2007–2019)
  2. Kandhi Elieisar (2019–present)
- Nauru –
  1. Baron Waqa (2013–2019)
  2. Lionel Aingimea (2019–present)
- New Zealand – Winston Peters (2017–2020)
- Niue – Toke Talagi (2008–2020)
- Palau – Faustina Rehuher-Marugg (2017–2021)
- Papua New Guinea –
  1. Rimbink Pato (2012–2019)
  2. Solan Mirisim (2019)
  3. Soroi Eoe (2019)
  4. Patrick Pruaitch (2019–2020)
- Samoa – Tuilaep Aiono Sailele Malielegaoi (1998–2021)
- Solomon Islands –
  1. Milner Tozaka (2014–2019)
  2. Jeremiah Manele (2019–present)
- Tokelau –
  1. Afega Gaualofa (2018–2019)
  2. Kerisiano Kalolo (2019–2020)
- Tonga –
  1. ʻAkilisi Pōhiva (2018–2019)
  2. Semisi Sika (acting) (2019)
  3. Pohiva Tu'i'onetoa (2019–2021)
- Tuvalu –
  1. Taukelina Finikaso (2013–2019)
  2. Simon Kofe (2019–2023)
- Vanuatu – Ralph Regenvanu (2017–2020)

== South America ==
- Argentina –
  1. Jorge Faurie (2017–2019)
  2. Felipe Solá (2019–present)
- Bolivia –
  1. Diego Pary (2018–2019)
  2. Karen Longaric (2019–2020)
- Brazil –
  1. Aloysio Nunes (2017–2019)
  2. Ernesto Araújo (2019–2021)
- Chile –
  1. Roberto Ampuero (2018–2019)
  2. Teodoro Ribera (2019–2020)
- Colombia –
  1. Carlos Holmes Trujillo (2018–2019)
  2. Adriana Mejía (acting) (2019)
  3. Claudia Blum (2019–2021)
- Ecuador – José Valencia Amores (2018–2020)
- Guyana –
  1. Carl Greenidge (2015–2019)
  2. Karen Cummings (2019–2020)
- Paraguay –
  1. Luis Castiglioni (2018–2019)
  2. Antonio Rivas Palacios (2019–2020)
- Peru –
  1. Néstor Popolizio (2018–2019)
  2. Gustavo Meza-Cuadra (2019–2020)
- Suriname – Yldiz Pollack-Beighle (2017–2020)
- Uruguay – Rodolfo Nin Novoa (2015–2020)
- Venezuela – Jorge Arreaza (2017–2021)

== See also ==
- List of current foreign ministers
