= List of foreign ministers in 2017 =

This is a list of foreign ministers in 2017.

== Africa ==
- Algeria
  1. Ramtane Lamamra (2013–2017)
  2. Abdelkader Messahel (2017–2019)
- Angola -
  1. Georges Rebelo Chicoti (2010–2017)
  2. Manuel Domingos Augusto (2017–2020)
- Benin - Aurélien Agbénonci (2016–2023)
- Botswana - Pelonomi Venson-Moitoi (2014–2018)
- Burkina Faso - Alpha Barry (2016–2021)
- Burundi - Alain Aimé Nyamitwe (2015–2018)
- Cameroon- Lejeune Mbella Mbella (2015–present)
- Cape Verde - Luís Felipe Tavares (2016–2021)
- Central African Republic - Charles-Armel Doubane (2016–present)
- Chad -
  1. Moussa Faki (2008–2017)
  2. Hissein Brahim Taha (2017)
  3. Mahamat Zene Cherif (2017–2020)
- Comoros -
  1. Mohamed Bacar Dossar (2016–2017)
  2. Mohamed El-Amine Souef (2017–2020)
- Congo–Brazzaville (Republic of the Congo) - Jean-Claude Gakosso (2015–present)
- Congo–Kinshasa (Democratic Republic of the Congo) - Léonard She Okitundu (2016–2019)
- Djibouti - Mahamoud Ali Youssouf (2005–present)
- Egypt - Sameh Shoukry (2014–present)
- Equatorial Guinea - Agapito Mba Mokuy (2012–2018)
- Eritrea - Osman Saleh (2007–present)
- Ethiopia - Workneh Gebeyehu (2016–2019)
- Gabon -
  1. Pacôme Moubelet-Boubeya (2016–2017)
  2. Noël Nelson Messone (2017–2018)
- The Gambia -
  1. Neneh MacDouall-Gaye (2015–2017)
  2. Yahya Jammeh (2017)
  3. Ousainou Darboe (2017–2018)
- Ghana -
  1. Hanna Tetteh (2013–2017)
  2. Shirley Ayorkor Botchway (2017–present)
- Guinea
  1. Makalé Camara (2016–2017)
  2. Mamadi Touré (2017–2021)
- Guinea-Bissau - Jorge Malú (2016–2018)
- Ivory Coast (Côte d'Ivoire) - Marcel Amon Tanoh (acting to 2017) (2016–2020)
- Kenya - Amina Mohamed (2013–2018)
- Lesotho -
  1. 'Mamphono Khaketla (2016–2017)
  2. Lesego Makgothi (2017–2020)
- Liberia - Marjon Kamara (2016–2018)
- Libya
  - Government of House of Representatives of Libya (Government of Libya internationally recognized to 2016) - Mohammed al-Dairi (2014–2019)
  - Government of National Accord of Libya (Interim government internationally recognized as the sole legitimate government of Libya from 2016) - Mohamed Taha Siala (2016–2021)
- Madagascar -
  1. Béatrice Atallah (2015–2017)
  2. Henry Rabary Njaka (2017–2018)
- Malawi -
  1. Francis Kasaila (2016–2017)
  2. Emmanuel Fabiano (2017–2019)
- Mali -
  1. Abdoulaye Diop (2014–2017)
  2. Tiéman Coulibaly (2017–2018)
- Mauritania - Isselkou Ould Ahmed Izid Bih (2016–2018)
- Mauritius - Vishnu Lutchmeenaraidoo (2016–2019)
- Morocco -
  1. Salaheddine Mezouar (2013–2017)
  2. Nasser Bourita (2017–present)
- Mozambique -
  1. Oldemiro Balói (2008–2017)
  2. José Condungua Pacheco (2017–2020)
- Namibia - Netumbo Nandi-Ndaitwah (2012–2024)
- Niger - Ibrahim Yacouba (2016–2018)
- Nigeria - Geoffrey Onyeama (2015–2023)
- Rwanda - Louise Mushikiwabo (2009–2018)
- São Tomé and Príncipe - Urbino Botelho (2016–2018)
- Senegal -
  1. Mankeur Ndiaye (2012–2017)
  2. Sidiki Kaba (2017–2019)
- Seychelles - Danny Faure (2016–2018)
- Sierra Leone -
  1. Samura Kamara (2012–2017)
  2. Kaifala Marah (2017–2018)
- Somalia -
  1. Abdisalam Omer (2015–2017)
  2. Yusuf Garaad Omar (2017–2018)
- Somaliland - Saad Ali Shire (2015–2018)
- South Africa - Maite Nkoana-Mashabane (2009–2018)
- South Sudan - Deng Alor (2016–2018)
- Sudan - Ibrahim Ghandour (2015–2018)
- Swaziland – Mgwagwa Gamedze (2013–2018)
- Tanzania - Augustine Mahiga (2015–2019)
- Togo - Robert Dussey (2013–present)
- Tunisia - Khemaies Jhinaoui (2016–2019)
- Uganda - Sam Kutesa (2005–2021)
- Western Sahara - Mohamed Salem Ould Salek (1998–2023)
- Zambia - Harry Kalaba (2014–2018)
- Zimbabwe -
  1. Simbarashe Mumbengegwi (2005–2017)
  2. Walter Mzembi (2017)
  3. Simbarashe Mumbengegwi (acting) (2017)
  4. Sibusiso Moyo (2017–2021)

== Asia ==
- Abkhazia - Daur Kove (2016–2021)
- Afghanistan - Salahuddin Rabbani (2015–2019)
- Armenia - Eduard Nalbandyan (2008-2018)
- Azerbaijan - Elmar Mammadyarov (2004–2020)
- Bahrain - Sheikh Khalid ibn Ahmad Al Khalifah (2005–2020)
- Bangladesh - Abul Hassan Mahmud Ali (2014–2019)
- Bhutan - Damcho Dorji (2015-2018)
- Brunei - Hassanal Bolkiah (2015–present)
- Cambodia - Prak Sokhon (2016–2023)
- China (People's Republic of China) - Wang Yi (2013–present)
- East Timor -
  1. Hernâni Coelho (2015–2017)
  2. Aurélio Guterres (2017–2018)
- Georgia - Mikheil Janelidze (2015–2018)
- India - Sushma Swaraj (2014–2019)
- Indonesia - Retno Marsudi (2014–present)
- Iran - Mohammad Javad Zarif (2013–2021)
- Iraq - Ibrahim al-Jaafari (2014–2018)
  - Kurdistan - Falah Mustafa Bakir (2006–2019)
- Israel - Benjamin Netanyahu (2015–2019)
- Japan -
  1. Fumio Kishida (2012–2017)
  2. Tarō Kōno (2017–2019)
- Jordan -
  1. Nasser Judeh (2009–2017)
  2. Ayman Safadi (2017–present)
- Kazakhstan – Kairat Abdrakhmanov (2016–2018)
- North Korea (Democratic People's Republic of Korea) - Ri Yong-ho (2016–2020)
- South Korea (Republic of Korea) -
  1. Yun Byung-se (2013–2017)
  2. Kang Kyung-wha (2017–2021)
- Kuwait - Sheikh Sabah Al-Khalid Al-Sabah (2011–2019)
- Kyrgyzstan - Erlan Abdyldayev (2012–2018)
- Laos - Saleumxay Kommasith (2016–present)
- Lebanon - Gebran Bassil (2014–2020)
- Malaysia - Anifah Aman (2009-2018)
- Maldives - Mohamed Asim (2016–2018)
- Mongolia -
  1. Tsend Munkh-Orgil (2016–2017)
  2. Damdin Tsogtbaatar (2017–2020)
- Myanmar - Aung San Suu Kyi (2016–2021)
- Nepal -
  1. Prakash Sharan Mahat (2016–2017)
  2. Krishna Bahadur Mahara (2017)
  3. Sher Bahadur Deuba (2017–2018)
- Oman - Yusuf bin Alawi bin Abdullah (1982–2020)
- Pakistan -
  1. Sartaj Aziz (2013-2017)
  2. Khawaja Muhammad Asif (2017–2018)
- Palestine - Riyad al-Maliki (2007–present)
- Philippines -
  1. Perfecto R. Yasay, Jr. (2016–2017)
  2. Enrique Manalo (acting) (2017)
  3. Alan Peter Cayetano (2017–2018)
- Qatar - Sheikh Mohammed bin Abdulrahman Al Thani (2016–present)
- Saudi Arabia - Adel al-Jubeir (2015–2018)
- Singapore - Vivian Balakrishnan (2015–present)
- South Ossetia -
  1. Murat Dzhoiev (2016–2017)
  2. Dmitry Medoyev (2017–2022)
- Sri Lanka -
  1. Mangala Samaraweera (2015–2017)
  2. Ravi Karunanayake (2017)
  3. Wasantha Senanayake (acting) (2017)
  4. Tilak Marapana (2017–2018)
- Syria (Syrian Arab Republic - Walid Muallem (2006–2020)
- Taiwan (Republic of China) - David Lee (2016–2018)
- Tajikistan - Sirodjidin Aslov (2013–present)
- Thailand - Don Pramudwinai (2015–2023)
- Turkey - Mevlüt Çavuşoğlu (2015–2023)
- Turkmenistan - Raşit Meredow (2001–present)
- United Arab Emirates - Sheikh Abdullah bin Zayed Al Nahyan (2006–present)
- Uzbekistan - Abdulaziz Komilov (2012–2022)
- Vietnam - Phạm Bình Minh (2011–2021)
- Yemen
  - Republic of Yemen - Abdulmalik Al-Mekhlafi (2015–2018)
  - Supreme Political Council (unrecognised, rival government) - Hisham Abdullah (2016-present)

== Europe ==
- Albania - Ditmir Bushati (2013–2019)
- Andorra -
  1. Gilbert Saboya Sunyé (2011–2017)
  2. Maria Ubach i Font (2017–2023)
- Austria -
  1. Sebastian Kurz (2013–2017)
  2. Karin Kneissl (2017–2019)
- Belarus - Vladimir Makei (2012–2022)
- Belgium - Didier Reynders (2011–2019)
  - Brussels - Guy Vanhengel (2013–2019)
  - Flanders - Geert Bourgeois (2014–2019)
  - Wallonia -
    1. Paul Magnette (2014–2017)
    2. Willy Borsus (2017–2019)
- Bosnia and Herzegovina - Igor Crnadak (2015–2019)
- Bulgaria -
  1. Daniel Mitov (2014–2017)
  2. Radi Naidenov (2017)
  3. Ekaterina Zakharieva (2017–2021)
- Croatia -
  1. Davor Ivo Stier (2016–2017)
  2. Marija Pejčinović Burić (2017–2019)
- Cyprus - Ioannis Kasoulidis (2013–2018)
- Czech Republic -
  1. Lubomír Zaorálek (2014–2017)
  2. Martin Stropnický (2017–2018)
- Denmark - Anders Samuelsen (2016–2019)
  - Faroe Islands - Poul Michelsen (2015–2019)
- Donetsk People's Republic - Natalya Nikonorova (acting) (2016–present)
- Estonia - Sven Mikser (2016–2019)
- Finland - Timo Soini (2015–2019)
- France -
  1. Jean-Marc Ayrault (2016–2017)
  2. Jean-Yves Le Drian (2017–2022)
- Germany -
  1. Frank-Walter Steinmeier (2013–2017)
  2. Sigmar Gabriel (2017–2018)
- Greece - Nikos Kotzias (2015–2018)
- Guernsey - Jonathan Le Tocq (2016–present)
- Hungary - Péter Szijjártó (2014–present)
- Iceland -
  1. Lilja Dögg Alfreðsdóttir (2016–2017)
  2. Guðlaugur Þór Þórðarson (2017–2021)
- Ireland -
  1. Charles Flanagan (2014-2017)
  2. Simon Coveney (2017–2022)
- Italy - Angelino Alfano (2016–2018)
- Jersey - Sir Philip Bailhache (2013–2018)
- Kosovo -
  1. Enver Hoxhaj (2016–2017)
  2. Emanuel Demaj (acting) (2017)
  3. Behgjet Pacolli (2017–2020)
- Latvia - Edgars Rinkēvičs (2011–2023)
- Liechtenstein - Aurelia Frick (2009–2019)
- Lithuania - Linas Antanas Linkevičius (2012–2020)
- Lugansk People's Republic - Vladislav Deinevo (acting) (2017–present)
- Luxembourg - Jean Asselborn (2004–2023)
- Republic of Macedonia -
  1. Nikola Poposki (2011–2017)
  2. Nikola Dimitrov (2017–2020)
- Malta -
  1. George Vella (2013–2017)
  2. Carmelo Abela (2017–2020)
- Moldova - Andrei Galbur (2016–2017)
  - Gagauzia - Vitaliy Vlah (2015–present)
- Monaco - Gilles Tonelli (2015–2019)
- Montenegro - Srđan Darmanović (2016–2020)
- Netherlands -
  1. Bert Koenders (2014–2017)
  2. Halbe Zijlstra (2017–2018)
- Norway -
  1. Børge Brende (2013–2017)
  2. Ine Marie Eriksen Søreide (2017–2021)
- Poland - Witold Waszczykowski (2015–2018)
- Portugal - Augusto Santos Silva (2015–2022)
- Romania -
  1. Lazăr Comănescu (2015–2017)
  2. Teodor Meleșcanu (2017–2019)
- Russia - Sergey Lavrov (2004–present)
- San Marino - Nicola Renzi (2016–2020)
- Serbia - Ivica Dačić (2014–2020)
- Slovakia - Miroslav Lajčák (2012–2020)
- Slovenia - Karl Erjavec (2012–2018)
- Spain - Alfonso Dastis (2016–2018)
  - Catalonia - Raül Romeva (2016–2017)
- Sweden - Margot Wallström (2014–2019)
- Switzerland
  1. Didier Burkhalter (2012–2017)
  2. Ignazio Cassis (2017–present)
- Transnistria - Vitaly Ignatiev (2015–present)
- Ukraine - Pavlo Klimkin (2014–2019)
- United Kingdom - Boris Johnson (2016–2018)
- Vatican City - Archbishop Paul Gallagher (2014–present)

== North America and the Caribbean ==
- Antigua and Barbuda - Charles Fernandez (2014–2018)
- The Bahamas -
  1. Fred Mitchell (2012–2017)
  2. Darren Henfield (2017–2021)
- Barbados - Maxine McClean (2008–2018)
- Belize - Wilfred Elrington (2008–2020)
- Canada -
  1. Stéphane Dion (2015–2017)
  2. Chrystia Freeland (2017–2019)
  - Quebec - Christine St-Pierre (2014–2018)
- Costa Rica - Manuel González Sanz (2014–2018)
- Cuba - Bruno Rodríguez Parrilla (2009–present)
- Dominica - Francine Baron (2014–2019)
- Dominican Republic - Miguel Vargas Maldonado (2016–2020)
- El Salvador - Hugo Martínez (2014–2018)
- Greenland -
  1. Vittus Qujaukitsoq (2014–2017)
  2. Suka K. Frederiksen (2017–2018)
- Grenada - Elvin Nimrod (2016–2018)
- Guatemala -
  1. Carlos Raúl Morales (2014–2017)
  2. Sandra Jovel (2017–2020)
- Haiti -
  1. Pierrot Delienne (2016–2017)
  2. Antonio Rodrigue (2017–2018)
- Honduras - María Dolores Agüero (2016–2019)
- Jamaica - Kamina Johnson-Smith (2016–present)
- Mexico -
  1. Claudia Ruiz Massieu (2015–2017)
  2. Luis Videgaray Caso (2017–2018)
- Nicaragua -
  1. Samuel Santos López (2007–2017)
  2. Denis Moncada (2017–present)
- Panama - Isabel Saint Malo (2014–2019)
- Puerto Rico –
  1. Víctor Suárez Meléndez (2015–2017)
  2. Luis G. Rivera Marín (2017–2019)
- Saint Kitts and Nevis - Mark Brantley (2015–2022)
- Saint Lucia - Allen Chastanet (2016–2021)
- Saint Vincent and the Grenadines - Sir Louis Straker (2015–2020)
- Trinidad and Tobago - Dennis Moses (2015–present)
- United States -
  1. John Kerry (2013–2017)
  2. Tom Shannon (acting) (2017)
  3. Rex Tillerson (2017–2018)

== Oceania ==
- Australia - Julie Bishop (2013–2018)
- Cook Islands - Henry Puna (2013–2020)
- Fiji - Frank Bainimarama (2016–2019)
- French Polynesia - Édouard Fritch (2014–present)
- Kiribati - Taneti Mamau (2016–present)
- Marshall Islands - John Silk (2016–2020)
- Micronesia - Lorin S. Robert (2007–2019)
- Nauru - Baron Waqa (2013–2019)
- New Zealand -
  1. Murray McCully (2008–2017)
  2. Gerry Brownlee (2017)
  3. Winston Peters (2017–2020)
- Niue - Toke Talagi (2008–2020)
- Palau -
  1. Billy Kuartei (2013–2017)
  2. Faustina Rehuher-Marugg (2017–2021)
- Papua New Guinea - Rimbink Pato (2012–2019)
- Samoa - Tuilaepa Aiono Sailele Malielegaoi (1998–2021)
- Solomon Islands - Milner Tozaka (2014–2019)
- Tokelau -
  1. Afega Gaualofa (2016–2017)
  2. Siopili Perez (2017–2018)
- Tonga -
  1. ʻAkilisi Pōhiva (2014–2017)
  2. Siaosi Sovaleni (2017–present)
- Tuvalu - Taukelina Finikaso (2013–2019)
- Vanuatu -
  1. Bruno Leingkone (2016–2017)
  2. Ralph Regenvanu (2017–2020)

== South America ==
- Argentina -
  1. Susana Malcorra (2015–2017)
  2. Jorge Faurie (2017–2019)
- Bolivia -
  1. David Choquehuanca (2006–2017)
  2. Fernando Huanacuni Mamani (2017–2018)
- Brazil -
  1. José Serra (2016–2017)
  2. Marcos Galvão (acting) (2017)
  3. Aloysio Nunes (2017–2019)
- Chile - Heraldo Muñoz (2014–2018)
- Colombia - María Ángela Holguín (2010-2017)
- Ecuador -
  1. Guillaume Long (2016–2017)
  2. María Fernanda Espinosa (2017–2018)
- Guyana - Carl Greenidge (2015–2019)
- Paraguay - Eladio Loizaga (2013–2018)
- Peru - Ricardo Luna (2016–2018)
- Suriname -
  1. Niermala Badrising (2015–2017)
  2. Yldiz Pollack-Beighle (2017–2020)
- Uruguay - Rodolfo Nin Novoa (2015–2020)
- Venezuela -
  1. Delcy Rodríguez (2014–2017)
  2. Samuel Moncada (2017)
  3. Jorge Arreaza (2017–2021)

== See also ==
- List of current foreign ministers
