= Malcorra =

Malcorra is a surname. Notable people with the surname include:

- Susana Malcorra (born 1954), Argentine electrical engineer and diplomat
- Víctor Malcorra (born 1987), Argentine footballer
