= Igor Crnadak =

Bosnian Serb politician (born 1972)

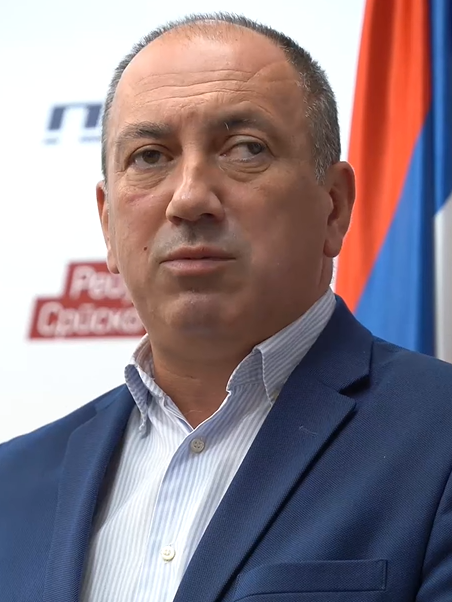
- Crnadak in 2023

Member of the National Assembly of Republika Srpska
- Incumbent
- Assumed office 23 December 2019

Minister of Foreign Affairs
- In office 31 March 2015 – 23 December 2019
- Prime Minister: Denis Zvizdić
- Preceded by: Zlatko Lagumdžija
- Succeeded by: Bisera Turković

Personal details
- Born: 28 July 1972 (age 54) Zadar, SR Croatia, SFR Yugoslavia
- Party: Party of Democratic Progress RS (since 2026)
- Other political affiliations: Party of Democratic Progress (1999–2026)
- Spouse: Đurđica Crnadak (died)
- Children: 2
- Education: University of Banja Luka (BEc)

Igor Crnadak (born 28 July 1972) is a Bosnian Serb politician who served as Minister of Foreign Affairs from 2015 to 2019. He has been serving as member of the National Assembly of Republika Srpska since 2019.

Crnadak was a member of the Party of Democratic Progress since its foundation in 1999, and served as its vice-president until 2026, when he left the party due to internal turmoil and established the Party of Democratic Progress of Republika Srpska.

== Early life and education ==
Coming from a Bosnian Serb family, Crnadak was born in Zadar and attended high school in Banja Luka. In 2004, he graduated from the Faculty of Economics at the University of Banja Luka.

== Political career ==
In his early career, Crnadak worked as journalist, anchor, producer and radio editor and wrote for numerous printed media. He worked as an anchor at a private radio in Banja Luka during the Bosnian War. Between 1996 and 1998, he was a correspondent for the Voice of America based in Banja Luka.

Since 1999, Crnadak has been a member of the Party of Democratic Progress (PDP) and has held numerous positions within the party. From 2000 to 2004, he was head of the PDP in the City Assembly of Banjaluka. He was a member of the European Integration Committee of the National Assembly of Republika Srpska in 2006. Since 2015, he has been vice-president of the PDP.

From 2007 until 2009, Crnadak was deputy Minister of Defence and was responsible for the Bosnian NATO Coordination Team. On 31 March 2015, he was appointed Minister of Foreign Affairs. His term as Minister ended on 23 December 2019.

== Personal life ==
Igor was married to Đurđica Crnadak and together they had two children. He speaks English fluently.

Crnadak is well known for suffering from strabismus.

== See also ==
- List of foreign ministers in 2015
- List of foreign ministers in 2016
- List of foreign ministers in 2017
- List of foreign ministers in 2018
- List of foreign ministers in 2019

Political offices
Preceded by Zlatko Lagumdžija	Minister of Foreign Affairs; 2015–2019	Succeeded by Bisera Turković
