= Claudia Ruiz Massieu =

Mexican lawyer and politician

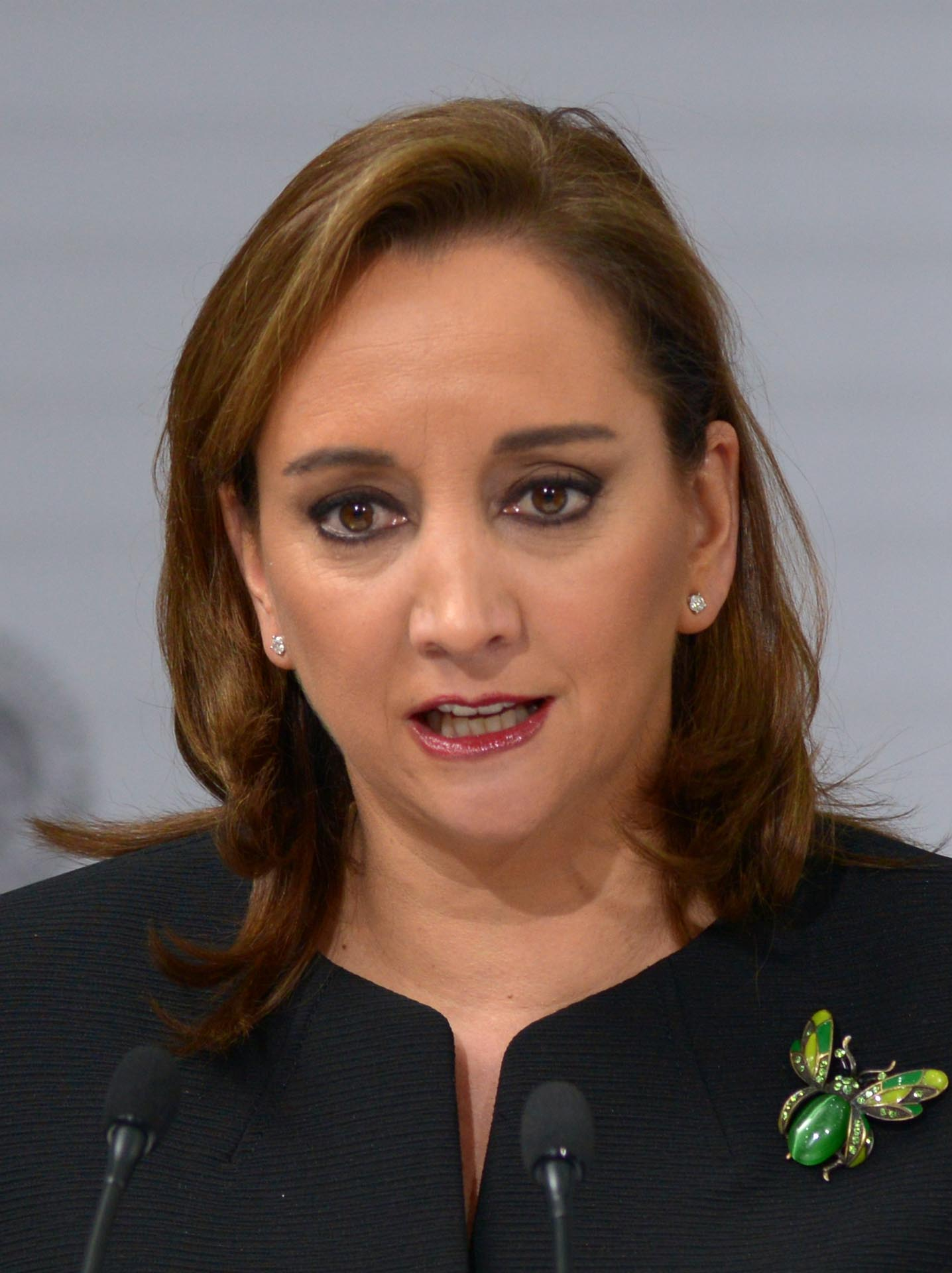
- Claudia Ruiz Massieu in 2015

54th President of the Institutional Revolutionary Party
- In office 16 July 2018 – 18 August 2019
- Preceded by: René Juárez Cisneros
- Succeeded by: Alejandro Moreno Cárdenas

Secretary-General of the Institutional Revolutionary Party
- In office 4 March 2017 – 16 July 2018
- President: Enrique Ochoa Reza; René Juárez Cisneros
- Preceded by: Carolina Monroy del Mazo
- Succeeded by: Rubén Moreira Valdez

Secretary of Foreign Affairs
- In office 27 August 2015 – 4 January 2017
- President: Enrique Peña Nieto
- Preceded by: José Antonio Meade
- Succeeded by: Luis Videgaray Caso

Secretary of Tourism
- In office 1 December 2012 – 27 August 2015
- President: Enrique Peña Nieto
- Preceded by: Gloria Guevara
- Succeeded by: Enrique de la Madrid

Personal details
- Born: 10 July 1972 (age 54) Mexico City, Mexico
- Party: Citizens' Movement (2024–present)
- Other political affiliations: Institutional Revolutionary Party (1992-2023)
- Spouse: Francisco Guillermo Ricalde Alarcón (m. 1997; sep. 2012)
- Children: María Ricalde Ruiz Massieu; José Francisco Ricalde Ruiz Massieu; Lucía Ricalde Ruiz Massieu
- Parents: José Francisco Ruiz Massieu (father); Adriana Salinas de Gortari (mother)
- Education: Ibero-American University

Claudia Ruiz Massieu Salinas DBE (born 10 July 1972) is a Mexican lawyer and politician affiliated with the Citizens' Movement Party. She served as Secretary of Foreign Affairs following her appointment by President Enrique Peña Nieto in 2015 to which she resigned on 4 January 2017.

Previously, she served as Secretary of Tourism from 2012 to 2015, having as a major achievement taking Mexico from the 15th to the 10th place for international tourist arrivals according to WTO. During President Peña Nietos transition period she was in charge of Human Rights and Transparency Affairs. She has also served two terms as Congresswoman, for the LIX and LXI Legislatures of the Mexican Congress.

== Personal background ==
Claudia Ruiz Massieu Salinas is the daughter of José Francisco Ruiz Massieu, and niece to former president Carlos Salinas de Gortari. Her father served as governor for the State of Guerrero, as well as secretary general of the national executive committee of the Institutional Revolutionary Party. She is a law graduate from the Universidad Iberoamericana, where she achieved her title with the thesis: "Jose Francisco Ruiz Massieu's Judiciary Theory on Constitutional and Administrative Law".

She holds a master's degree in comparative politics by FLACSO Mexico and is currently a doctorate candidate in public law and philosophy by the University of Madrid, Spain.

== Professional career ==
=== Public offices ===
Ruiz Massieu Salinas served two terms as Congresswoman, for the LIX (2003-2006) and LXI (2009-2012) Legislatures of the Mexican Congress.

On January 4, 2007 she was appointed as General Coordinator for Planning, Development and Institutional Innovation at the Attorney General´s Office. And as of 2006 she served as Chief of Staff for the Executive Secretariat of the National Security System on the Secretary of Public Security.

During the transition period of President Enrique Peña Nieto as President Elect, she was in charge of Human Rights and Transparency Affairs. After that, on November 30, 2012, President Peña Nieto appointed her as Secretary of Tourism, charge she left on August 21, 2015, when she was named as Secretary of Foreign Affairs, to which she resigned on January 4, 2017.

=== Academic experience ===
At the Universidad Nacional Autonoma de México she worked as research assistant at the Instituto de Investigaciones Jurídicas from 1995 to 1997. Then she integrated to the technical academic team on the International Commerce research unit also at the Instituto de Investigaciones Jurídicas. In 1997 she became a Law professor at Universidad Anahuac Sur.

=== Electronic and print media ===
Regular writer at the newspaper El Universal, as personal opinion writer, but also with the column "México Global", during her time as Secretary of Foreign Affairs.

== Elected offices ==
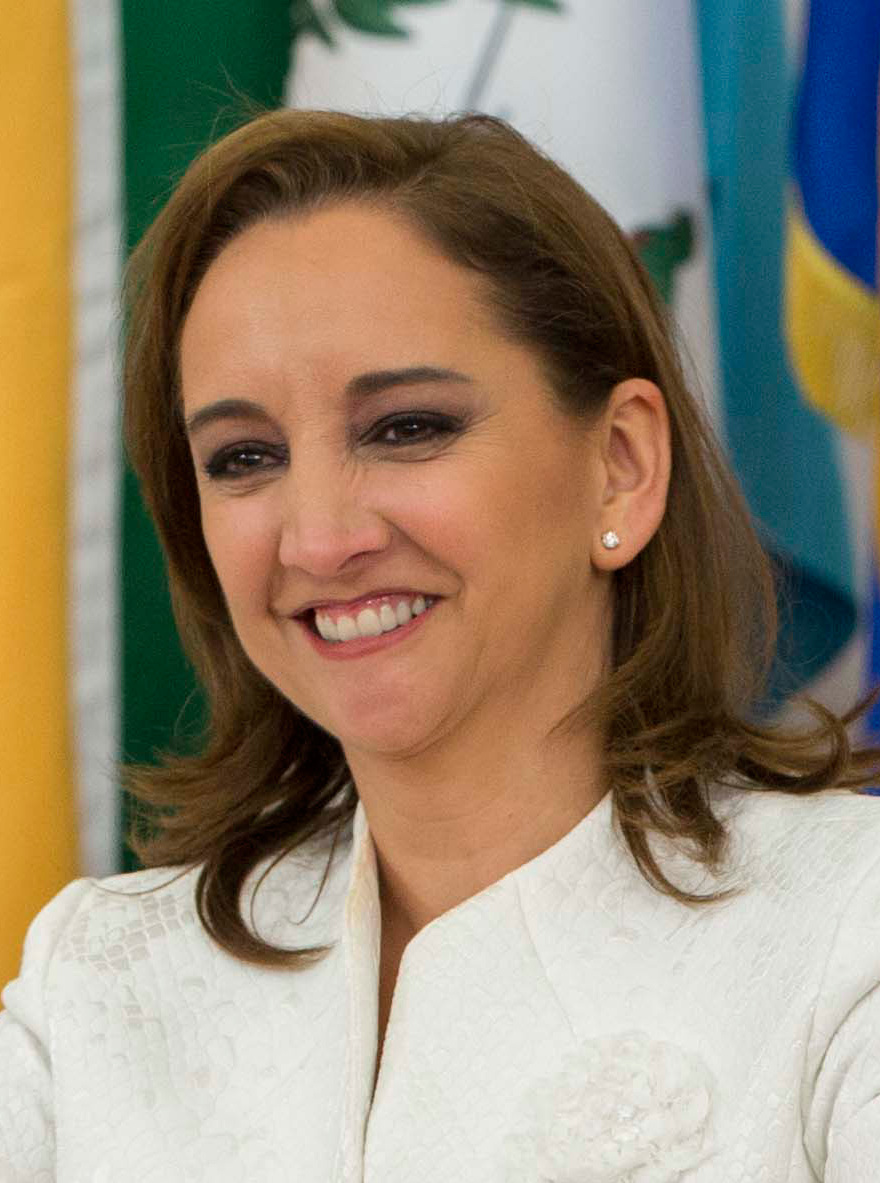
Inauguration of the Meeting of Ministers of Agriculture of the Americas 2015.

=== LIX Legislature (2003–2006) ===
During this time she was part of the following Committees:

- President of the Justice and Human Rights Committee
- Secretary of the Governance Committee
- Member of the Mexico City Committee
- Member of the State Reform Special Committee
- Member of the Jurisdictional Committee

=== LXI Legislatura (2009–2012) ===
During this time she was part of the following Committees:

- Secretary of the Governance Committee
- Member of the Treasury Committee
- Member of the Appropriations Committee
- Member of the Budget Analysis Special Committee
- Member of the Center of Studies for Public Finances Committee
- Member of the Mexico-European Union Mixed Committee
- Member of the Mexico-United States of America Mixed Committee

== See also ==
- List of foreign ministers in 2015
- List of foreign ministers in 2016
- List of foreign ministers in 2017

Political offices
Preceded by Gloria Guevara	Secretary of Tourism; 2012–2015	Succeeded by Enrique de la Madrid Cordero
Preceded by José Antonio Meade Kuribreña	Secretary of Foreign Affairs; 2015–2017	Succeeded by Luis Videgaray Caso
