= Karen Mirzoyan =

Armenian diplomat

- Կարեն Միրզոյան
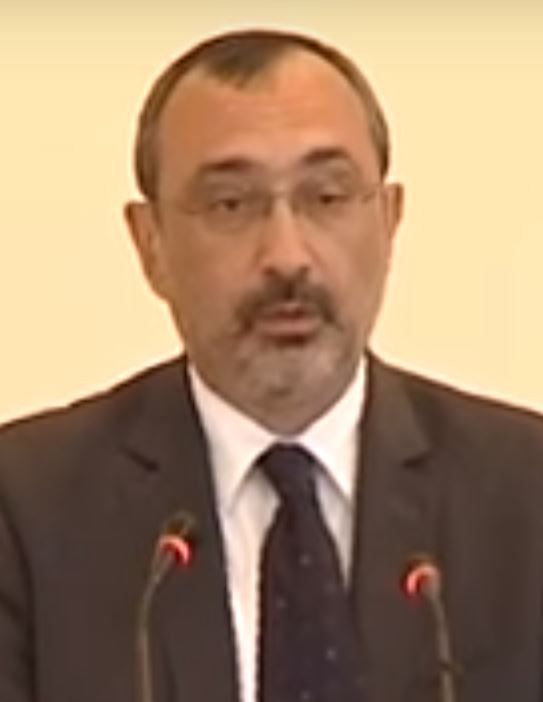
- Mirzoyan in 2013

Foreign Minister of Nagorno-Karabakh
- In office 22 September 2012 – 25 September 2017
- President: Bako Sahakyan
- Prime Minister: Arayik Harutyunyan
- Preceded by: Vasily Atajanyan (Acting)
- Succeeded by: Masis Mayilyan

Karen Mirzoyan (Armenian: Կարեն Միրզոյան) is a diplomat of Armenia and previously of the Republic of Artsakh. From September 2012 until September 2017 he served as the Republic's Minister of Foreign Affairs.

== Career ==
=== Foreign minister ===
On June 6, 2013, Mirzoyan was interviewed by France24, and on July 24, 2014 Mirzoyan was interviewed by the European Times.

In September 2014, Mirzoyan led a diplomatic mission to the Basque Parliament. Mirzoyan met with Bakartxo Tejeria Otermin—speaker of the Basque Parliament. He also toured Guernica. The Basque Parliament and the Nagorno-Karabakh's legislature passed reciprocal motions recognizing one another's right to national autonomy.

Remaining Foreign Affairs Minister of the Republic of Artsakh (Nagorno-Karabakh), in March 2017, he visited Greece as part of an event hosted by the Armenian National Committee of Greece.

In September 2017, Karen Mirzoyan was succeeded as Foreign Minister of the Artsakh Republic by Masis Mayilyan.

=== Ambassador-at-large ===
On June 28, 2019, he was appointed Ambassador-at-Large by Nikol Pashinyan.

On November 16, 2020, during the political crisis created by the 2020 Nagorno-Karabakh ceasefire agreement, he resigned from his post.

== See also ==
- List of foreign ministers in 2017
- List of current foreign ministers
- Foreign relations of Nagorno-Karabakh

Political offices
| Preceded by Vasily Atajanyan (acting) | Foreign Minister of Nagorno-Karabakh; 22 September 2012–present | Succeeded by Masis Mayilyan |
