= Susana Malcorra =

Argentine diplomat and electrical engineer

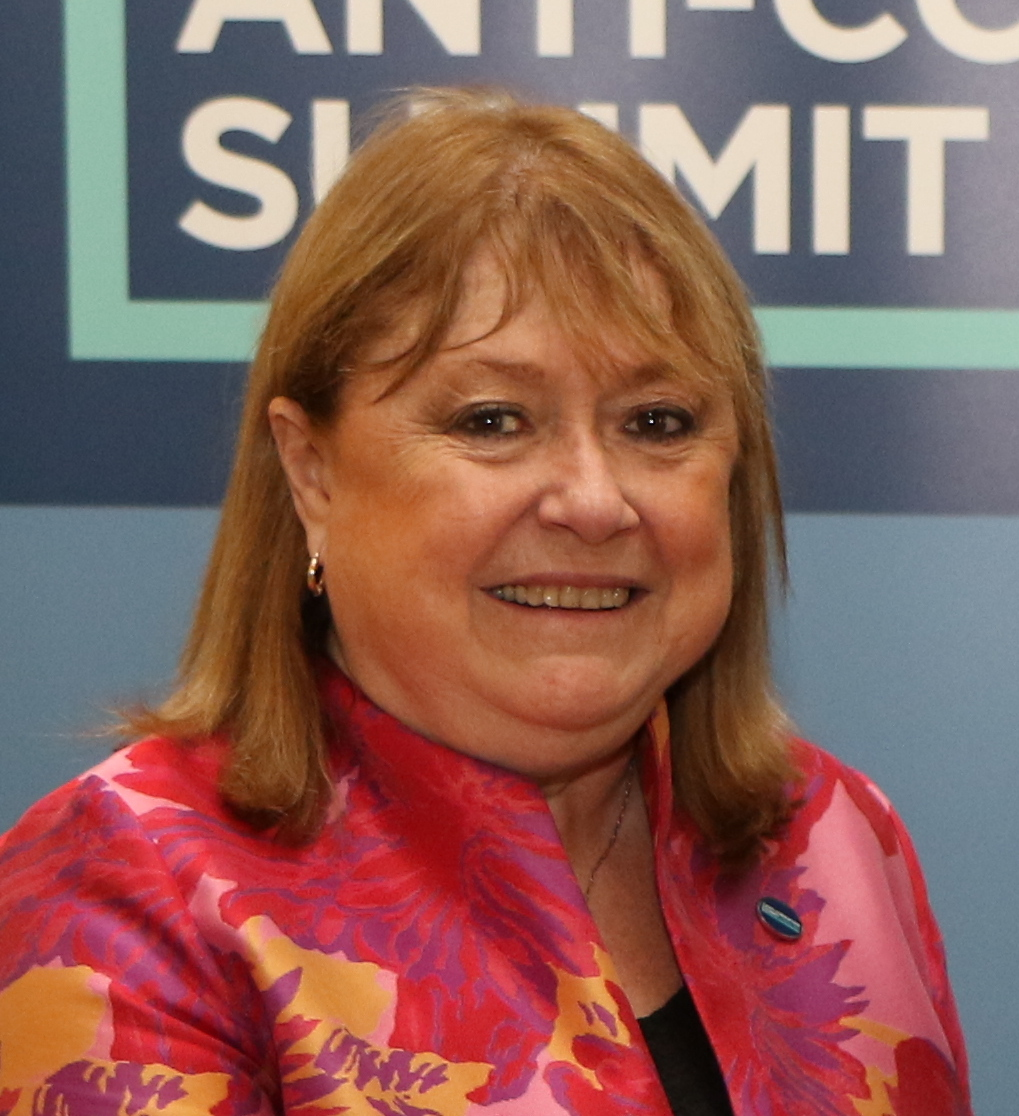
- Malcorra in 2016

Minister of Foreign Affairs
- In office 10 December 2015 – 12 June 2017
- President: Mauricio Macri
- Preceded by: Héctor Timerman
- Succeeded by: Jorge Faurie

Under Secretary-General of the United Nations for Field Support
- In office 14 March 2008 – 1 March 2012
- Secretary-General: Ban Ki-moon
- Preceded by: Jane Lute
- Succeeded by: Anthony Banbury

Personal details
- Born: 18 November 1954 (age 71) Rosario, Argentina
- Party: Radical Civic Union
- Other political affiliations: Cambiemos (2015–present)
- Education: National University of Rosario

Susana Mabel Malcorra (born 18 November 1954) is an Argentine electrical engineer, GWL Voices co-founder and president, who served as foreign minister of Argentina from 2015 to 2017. She was announced for the position by President Mauricio Macri on 24 November 2015. Prior to that she was Chef de Cabinet to the Executive Office at the United Nations, appointed by UN Secretary-General Ban Ki-moon in March 2012 and served as his chief of staff between April 2012 and November 2016.

Upon learning of Malcorra's appointment as Minister in Argentina, UN Secretary-General Ban Ki-moon congratulated her, adding that: "Ms. Malcorra has served the United Nations with great distinction. [...] I know from my conversations with world leaders and civil society that Ms. Malcorra is well-respected across the world."

On 29 May 2017, Malcorra announced her resignation from the position as foreign minister to move to Madrid to be closer to her family and was succeeded by Jorge Faurie, the Argentine ambassador to France, on 12 June. Malcorra is currently Dean of the IE School of Global and Public Affairs at IE University in Madrid.

== Early life and education ==
Susana Mabel Malcorra was born in Rosario, in the province of Santa Fe. She graduated as an electrical engineer from the University of Rosario. Between 1979 and 1993 she worked at IBM, and in 1993 she joined Telecom Argentina.

== Career ==
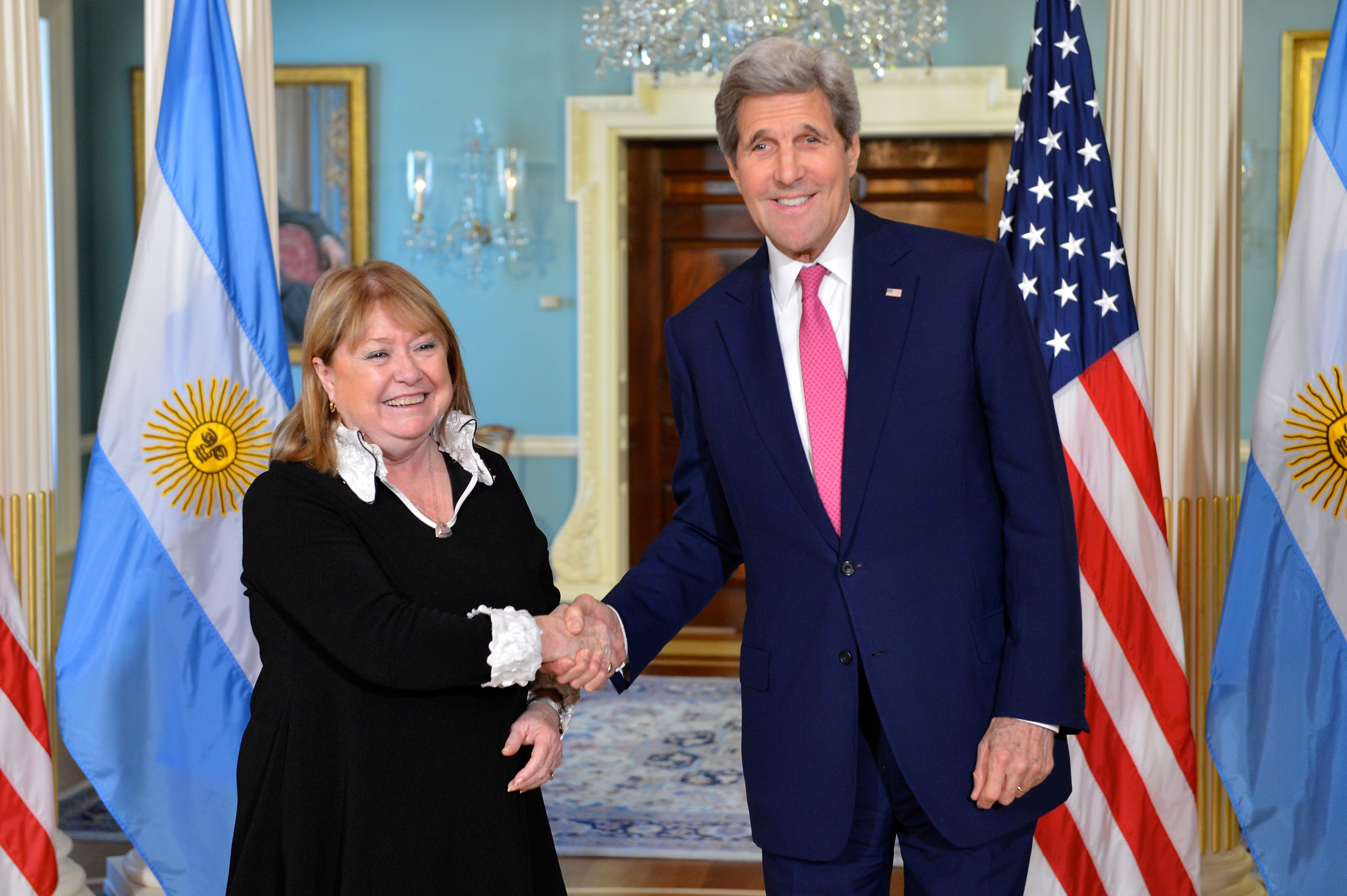
Malcorra with US Secretary of State, John Kerry, in Washington, D.C., March 2016

Malcorra served as the United Nations Under-Secretary-General for Field Support. She was appointed by Secretary-General Ban Ki-moon in March 2008, succeeding Jane Holl Lute. Prior to that, she had been chief operating officer and deputy executive director of the World Food Programme, where she oversaw emergency and humanitarian operations in more than 80 countries. During the tsunami emergency in December 2004, she led the first phase of the operational response and mustered human resources, budget, finance, information, technology, telecommunications, administration and security to deal with the disaster.

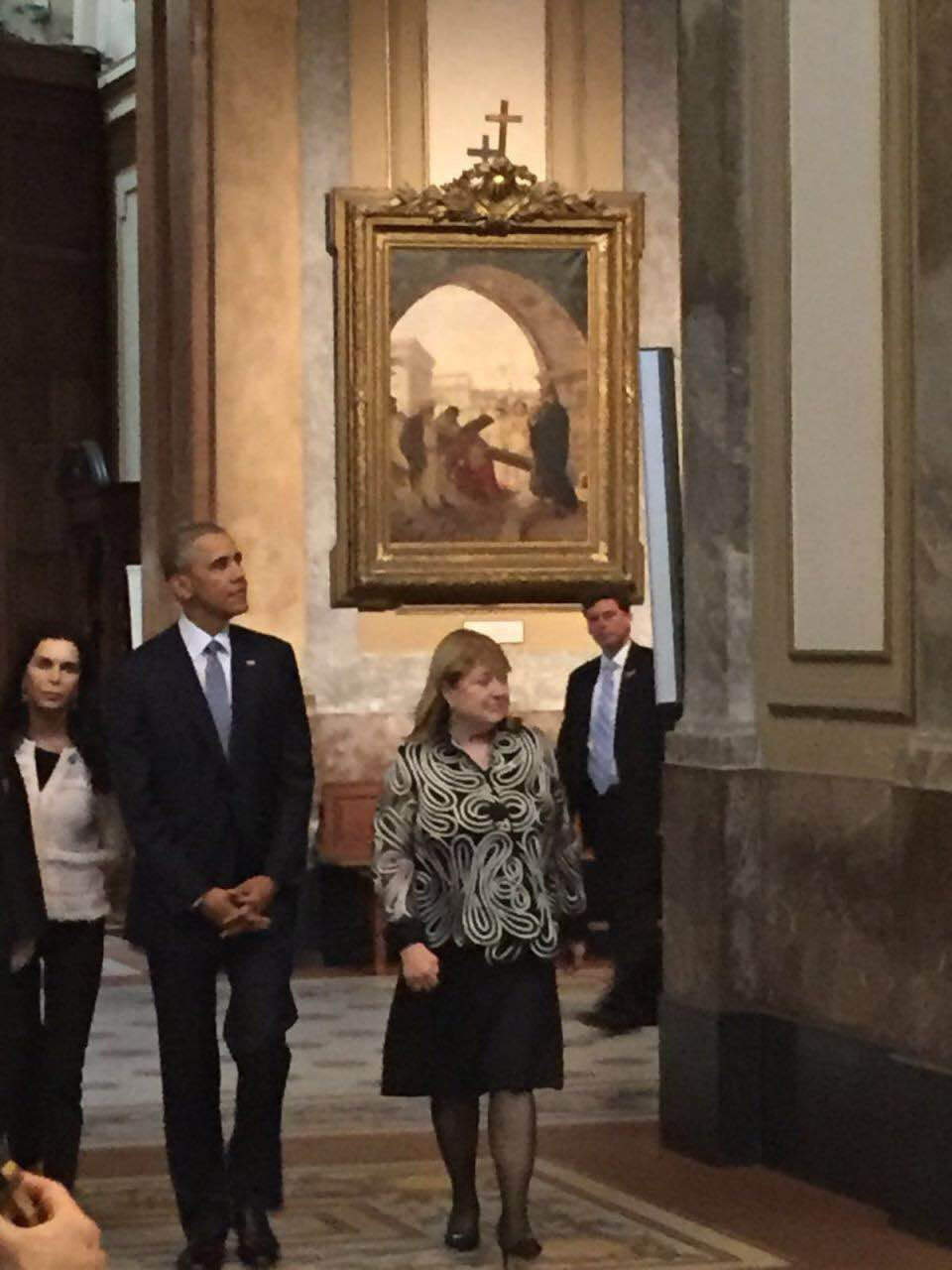
Malcorra and the United States President Barack Obama in Buenos Aires Cathedral, March 2016

She had more than 25 years of experience in the private sector before joining the WFP. She started her career at IBM Argentina in 1979. During her fourteen years in the company, she held several different positions, the last one being Branch Manager for Public Sector and Services. She was assigned to the headquarters in 1986 as part of the Management Development Programme. She left IBM Argentina in January 1993 to join Telecom Argentina.

During her tenure at Telecom Argentina she again held various responsibilities, from Regional Manager and Head of the Mass Market Unit to chief operating officer. In 2001 she was appointed CEO of the company.

In November 2015, Argentine President-Elect Macri announced her as future foreign minister. Since her first day in charge, she has been changing Argentina's foreign policy, making a distance from Bolivarian axes, and returning to a very close relationship with the United States and the European countries.

== Minister of Foreign Relations ==
As Minister of Foreign Relations, and with the support of President Mauricio Macri, Malcorra revitalized bilateral relations with the United States and Europe, reviewed the fundamentals of Mercosur, evaluated alternatives that involve more free trade and the country returned to a single exchange rate, which It allowed the reactivation of commodity exports and attracted foreign direct investment.

=== United Nations Secretary-General selection ===
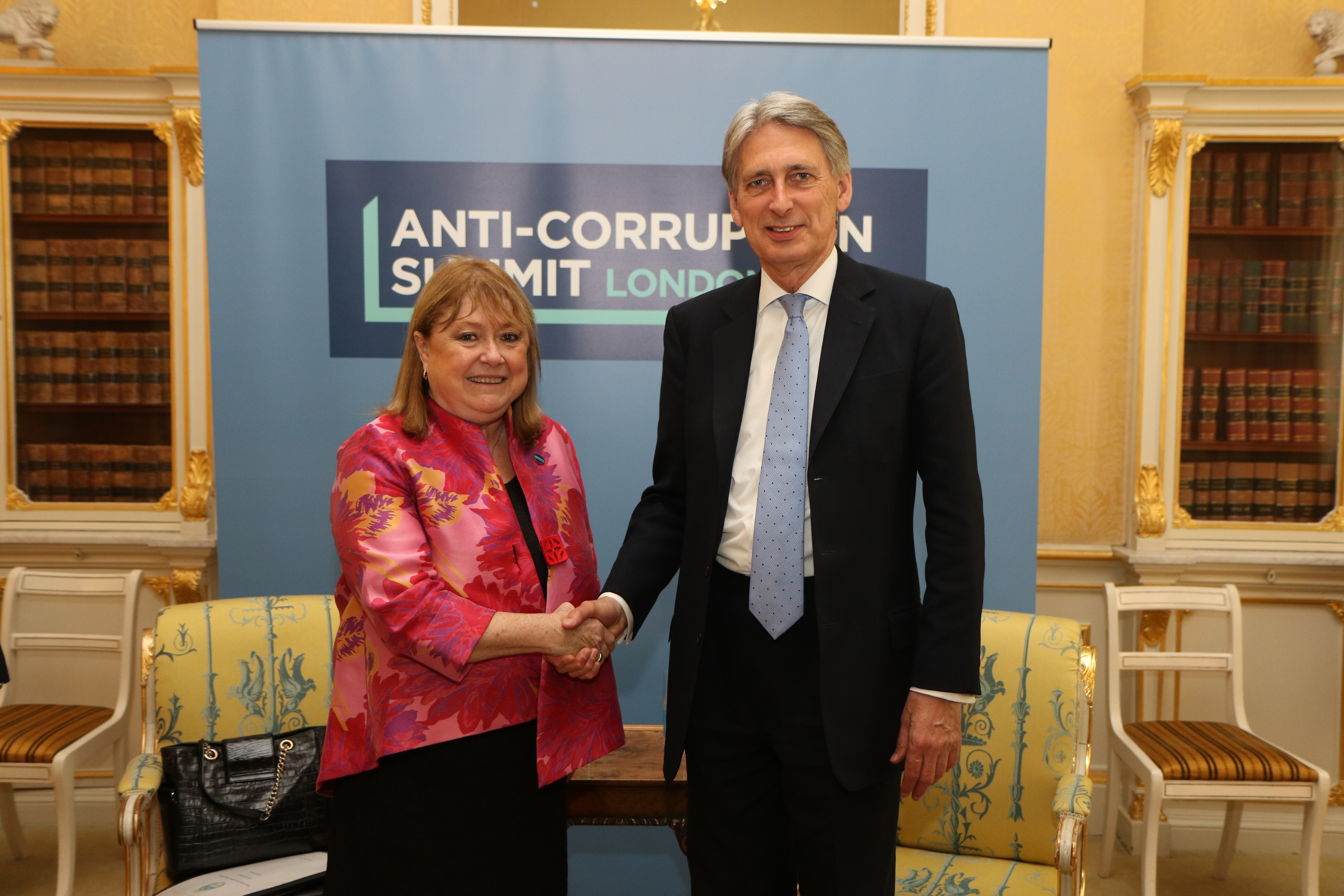
Malcorra and former British foreign secretary Philip Hammond, in London, 2016

Minister Malcorra was a candidate to replace Ban Ki-moon as secretary general of the UN starting in January 2017. She has been asked several questions about accountability for harms caused by UN Peacekeeper troops. On 8 June, in response to a question by the Ambassador of Lichtenstein regarding accountability for the cholera outbreak in Haiti started by a deployment of UN Peacekeepers, Malcorra replied, "It is now in legal process, I'm not privy to it so it's hard for me to fully answer the question without getting into an arena that I'm not fully in. It's clear the UN is invested a lot to build up the infrastructure of Haiti based on the cholera experience/chain reaction so that is something that the UN needs to do more. The trust established was not fully filled so there is an element of working with the Haitians to handle cholera. On the specifics, I'd rather wait to be better informed." Most of the candidates for secretary general, all of whom have less extensive UN experience have taken a position in favor of stronger UN accountability, including compensation to the victims.

In terms of UN accountability for sexual assault and exploitation by UN troops, she stated, "The Organization's efforts to prevent sexual exploitation and abuse in all manifestations and, where it does occur, to support victims and hold accountable those responsible, requires our utmost priority in order to fulfill the obligations incumbent upon us. This must be done with the political will that can only be derived from a full partnership with Member States." Responding the U.S. on the same subject, she emphasized, "I think we have to go beyond what we have today and that's why I've proposed this question of the code of conduct."

== Later career ==
Since 2022, Malcorra has been serving on the joint World Bank/WHO Global Preparedness Monitoring Board (GPMB), co-chaired by Joy Phumaphi and Bente Angell-Hansen.

== Other activities ==
- IE University, Dean, School of Global and Public Affairs
- International Crisis Group (ICG), Board of Trustees (since 2019)
- IE Business School, Transatlantic Relations Initiative Distinguished Fellow
- Inter-American Dialogue, Member of the Board of Directors
- World Economic Forum (WEF), Member of the Global Future Council on Geopolitics (2018-2019)

== Honors and awards ==
- Spain: Knight Grand Cross of the Order of Isabella the Catholic
- Bolivia: Grand Cross of the Order of the Condor of the Andes

== Personal life ==
She is married and has one son. She describes herself as an atheist.

== See also ==
- List of female foreign ministers
- List of ministers of foreign affairs and worship
- List of foreign ministers in 2017
- List of foreign ministers in 2016
- List of foreign ministers in 2015
- Foreign relations of Argentina

Diplomatic posts
| Preceded by Jane Lute | Under Secretary-General of the United Nations for Field Support; 2008–2012 | Succeeded by Anthony Banbury |
Political offices
| Preceded by Héctor Timerman | Minister of Foreign Affairs; 2015–2017 | Succeeded by Jorge Faurie |
