= Aurélien Agbénonci =

Beninese diplomat (born 1958)

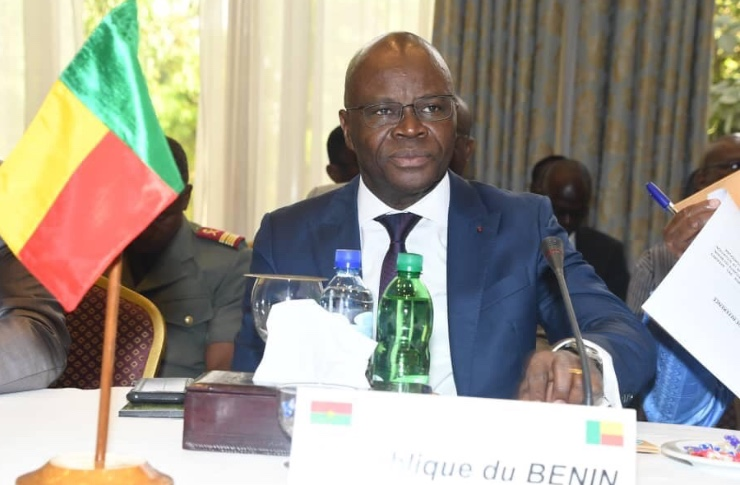
- Aurélien Agbénonci (2018)

Minister of Foreign Affairs
- In office 2016 – 2023
- Appointed by: Patrice Talon
- President: Patrice Talon
- Preceded by: Saliou Akadiri
- Succeeded by: Paulette Marcelline Adjovi

UN Multidimensional Integrated Stabilization Mission in the Central African Republic
- In office 2014 – 2016
- Appointed by: Ban Ki-Moon
- Preceded by: Georg Charpentier

Personal details
- Born: 20 October 1958 (age 67) Porto-Novo, Benin
- Education: Paris Nanterre University
- Profession: Politician

Aurélien Agbénonci (born 20 October 1958) is a Beninese diplomat who served in the government of Benin as Minister of Foreign Affairs from 2016 to 2023. Previously he was Deputy Special Representative of the Secretary-General for the United Nations Multidimensional Integrated Stabilization Mission in the Central African Republic (MINUSCA).

== Education ==
Agbénonci earned graduate degrees in international trade law from the University of Paris X Nanterre and in institutional development, governance and environmental sciences from the University of Dakar in Senegal. He also holds a master's degree in business law from the University of Dakar.

== Career ==
Prior to his career with the United Nations, Agbénonci was Senior Programme Coordinator and Chief of Staff at the Pan–African Social Prospects Centre in Benin, and worked in the Faculty of Law at the University of Nanterre in France. He has served throughout Africa, including as Deputy Resident Representative of the United Nations Development Programme (UNDP) in Ivory Coast, from 1999 to 2003, and Cameroon, from 1996 to 1999. He was United Nations Resident Coordinator and UNDP Resident Representative in Rwanda, from 2008 to 2011, and Congo, from 2003 to 2008. Agbénonci was the Humanitarian Coordinator, United Nations Resident Coordinator and UNDP Resident Representative in Mali from 2012 to 2013.

Agbénonci was appointed Deputy Special Representative, as well as the United Nations Resident Coordinator and the UNDP Resident Representative, by United Nations Secretary-General Ban Ki-moon on 25 April 2014. When Patrice Talon took office as President of Benin on 6 April 2016, he appointed Agbénonci as Minister of Foreign Affairs and Cooperation.

Political offices
Preceded by Saliou Akadiri	Foreign Minister of Benin; 2016–2023	Incumbent
