= Ibrahim Ghandour =

Sudanese politician (born 1952)

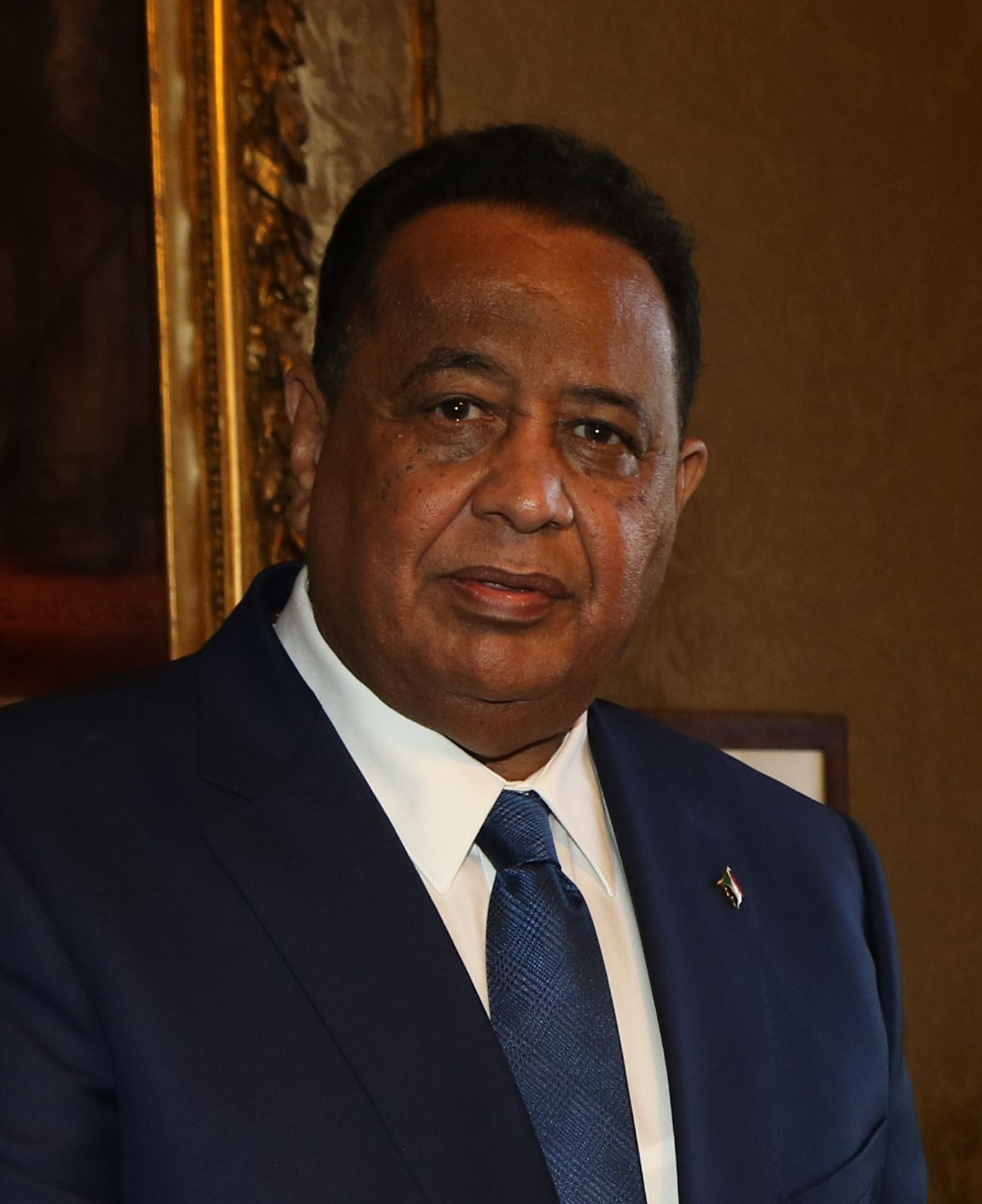
Ghandour in 2017

Ibrahim Ghandour (Arabic: إبراهيم غندور; born 6 December 1952) was the Foreign Minister of Sudan from 9 June 2015 to 19 April 2018 and the former head of the ruling National Congress Party.

Ghandour, whose background is in academia as opposed to the military, was chosen as part of an attempt by the Sudanese government to boost ties with the United States. Ghandour is a former presidential assistant, and also previously worked as a consultant with the World Health Organization. He was chief negotiator for the talks with rebel groups in South Kordofan and Blue Nile State.

Ghandour was imprisoned in 2020 after Omar Bashir's ouster. He was released from prison after the October 2021 Sudanese coup d'état but was imprisoned again the following day.

== See also ==
- List of foreign ministers in 2017
- List of current foreign ministers

Political offices
Preceded by Ali Ahmed Karti	Foreign Minister of Republic of Sudan; 2015–2018	Succeeded by Mohamed Abdalla Idris
