= Elias Shoniyin =

Liberian politician

B. Elias Shoniyin

Dean at Cuttington University
- In office 2021–Present

Former Deputy Minister at Liberia Ministry of foreign Affairs
- In office December 2014 – May 2019
- President: President Ellen Johnson Sirleaf

Former acting Minister at Liberia Ministry of foreign Affairs
- In office 2015–2016

Personal details
- Born: Liberia
- Party: Unity Party
- Education: University of Liberia; Crawford School of Public Policy
- Occupation: Politician, Academic
- Portfolio: International affairs and diplomacy

B. Elias Shoniyin is a Liberian politician, diplomat, and academic. Between 2014 and 2019, he served as Liberia Deputy Minister of Foreign Affairs, occasionally acting as Foreign Minister. Currently, Shoniyin is the Dean at Cuttington University Graduate School since 2021. In January 2025, Shoniyin was appointed as Chair of the Policy Advisory Council at the Ministry of Foreign Affairs. In addition, he serves as managing director of Africa Development Management Associates (ADMA) and an active member of the Unity Party.

== Education ==
Shoniyin holds an associate degree in English literature from Lincoln College of Professional Studies, Liberia; a Bachelor of Arts degree in sociology and demographics from the University of Liberia; and an Advanced Diploma in Contemporary Diplomacy and International Relations from the Gibriel L. Dennis Foreign Service Institute, Ministry of Foreign Affairs, Liberia. He later earned a Graduate Diploma in Public Administration, and Master of Public Policy from Crawford School of Public Policy, The Australian National University.

== Career ==
In 1995, Shoniyin started his career serving as Team Leader for the Special Cholera Program at the Ministry of Health in Monrovia. He later worked as lecturer at Lincoln College in Liberia (2001), and Master Trainer with World Vision Liberia (2004).

Shoniyin joined Liberia's Ministry of Foreign Affairs in 2006, serving as Assistant Minister until 2011. Shoniyin was appointed as Deputy Minister of Foreign Affairs in 2013 and became Principal Deputy Minister in 2014, serving in that capacity until 2019, including periods as Acting Foreign Minister in 2015 and 2016. During his tenure, he coordinated international support during the 2014 Ebola outbreak in West Africa and in shaping Liberia's diplomatic strategy. In 2019, he was named a World Fellow at Yale University. He has also served as a lecturer in international relations at the University of Liberia's graduate school. In January 2025, he was appointed Chair of the Ambassadors-at-Large group within the Policy Advisory Council of the Ministry of Foreign Affairs, advising on strategic diplomatic initiatives.

Beyond government service, Shoniyin serves as Dean of the School of Global Affairs and Policy at Cuttington University Graduate School in Liberia and is the managing director of Africa Development Management Associates (ADMA), a firm specializing in governance, policy, and development consulting.

== Engagement and views ==
In a 2022 speech at the University of Liberia, Shoniyin criticized the use of ethnicity, region, and party loyalty in selecting leaders, urging Liberians to prioritize competence and vision to drive national progress.

In 2023, Shoniyin spoke at the Africa Economic Summit in Ghana, urging African leaders to improve infrastructure, boost intra-African trade, and embrace regional integration to build a unified continental market.

== See also ==
- Minister of Foreign Affairs (Liberia)
- Ministry of Foreign Affairs (Liberia)
