= Emmanuel Fabiano =

Malawian politician

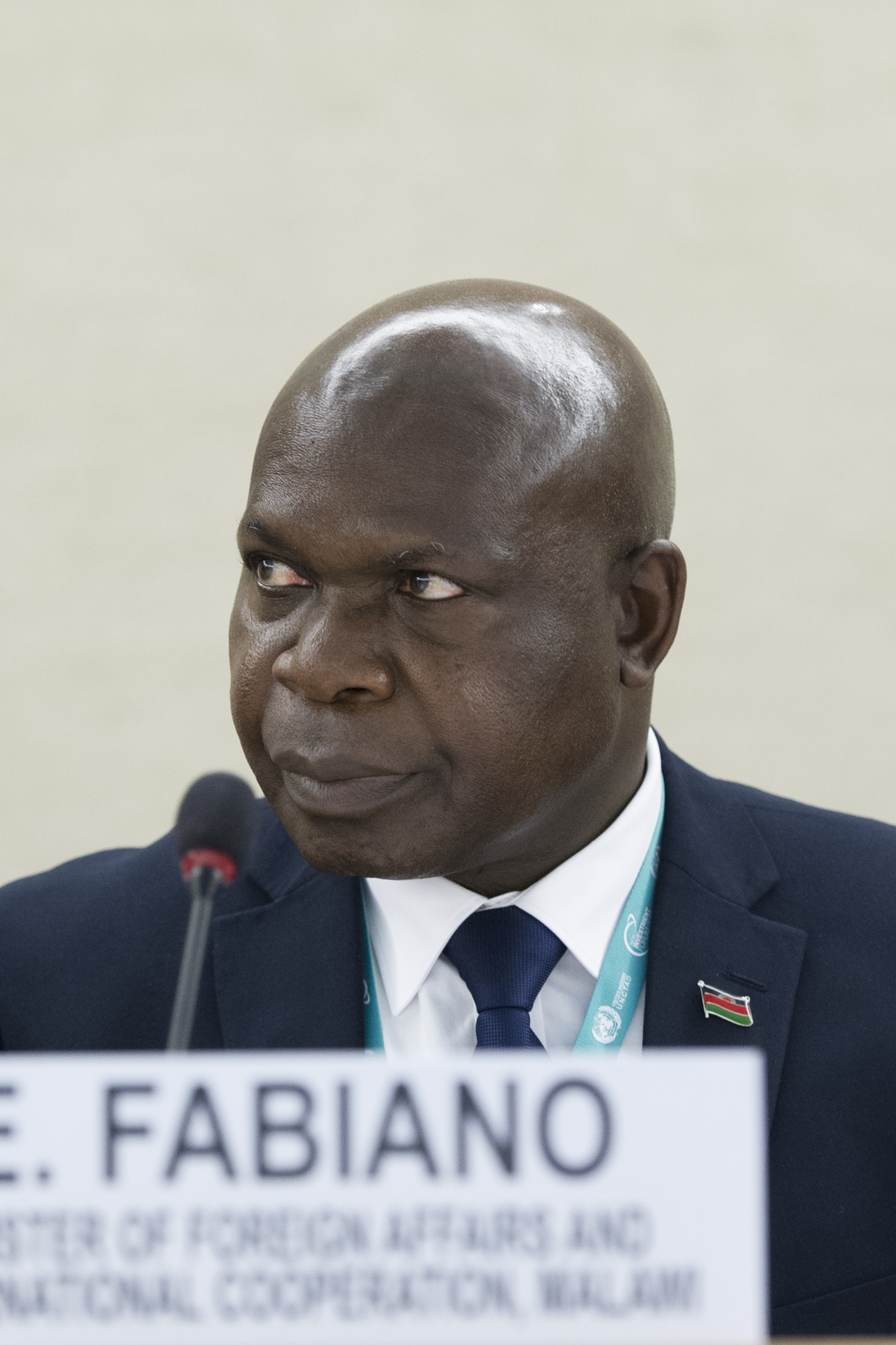

Minister of Education, Science and Technology of Malawi
- In office 19 June 2014 – 17 June 2019
- President: Peter Mutharika

Personal details
- Born: Malawi
- Party: Democratic Progressive Party (Malawi)

Emmanuel Fabiano is a Malawian politician and educator. He is a former Minister of Education, Science and Technology of Malawi, having been appointed to the position on 12 January 2014 by former president of Malawi Peter Mutharika. His term began on 19 June 2014.

Awards and achievements
Preceded by	Minister of Education, Science and Technology of Malawi	Succeeded by
