= Francine Baron =

Dominican politician and attorney

The Honourable Francine Baron
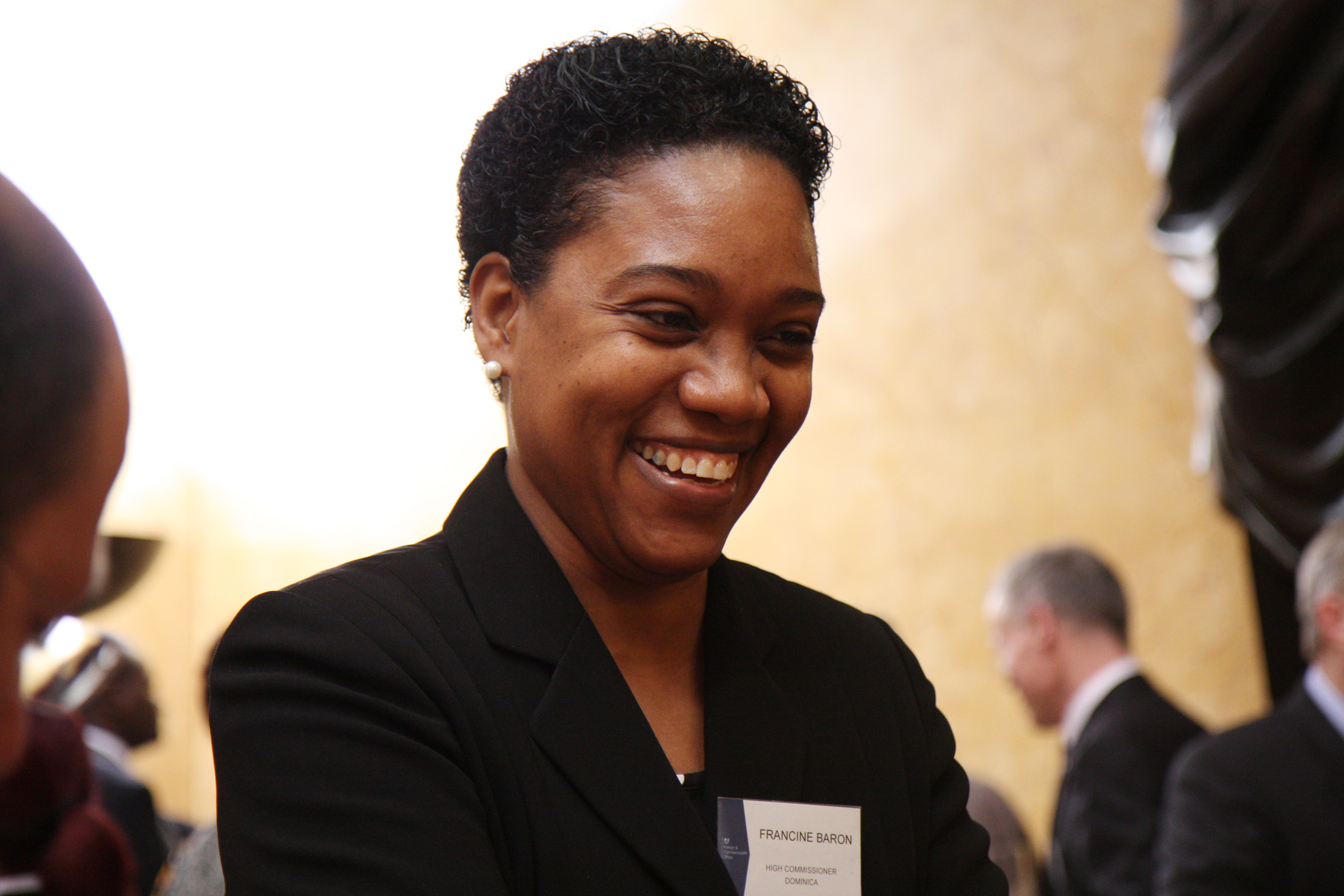

Minister of Foreign Affairs and CARICOM Affairs
- In office 13 December 2014 – 25 December 2019
- Prime Minister: Roosevelt Skerrit
- Preceded by: Roosevelt Skerrit
- Succeeded by: Kenneth Darroux

Personal details
- Party: Dominica Labour Party
- Relations: A. A. Baron (grandfather)
- Parent: Frank Baron
- Education: Holborn School of Law

Francine Baron is a Dominican politician, attorney, and the Minister of Foreign and CARICOM Affairs from 2014 to 2019. She previously served as Attorney General of Dominica from 2007 to 15 October 2010 (becoming the first woman in the position) and High Commissioner for Dominica to the UK from 31 August 2012 to December 2014. She is the child of Dominica's first Chief Minister Frank Baron who served as Chief Minister from 1960 to 1961. Her grandfather, A. A. Baron served on the Legislative Council from 1925 into the 1930s.

In her youth, Baron studied at BPP University.

== See also ==
- List of foreign ministers in 2017
