= Nataliya Nikonorova =

Ukrainian separatist politician (born 1984)

Natalia Nikonorova
- Наталья Никоноровa
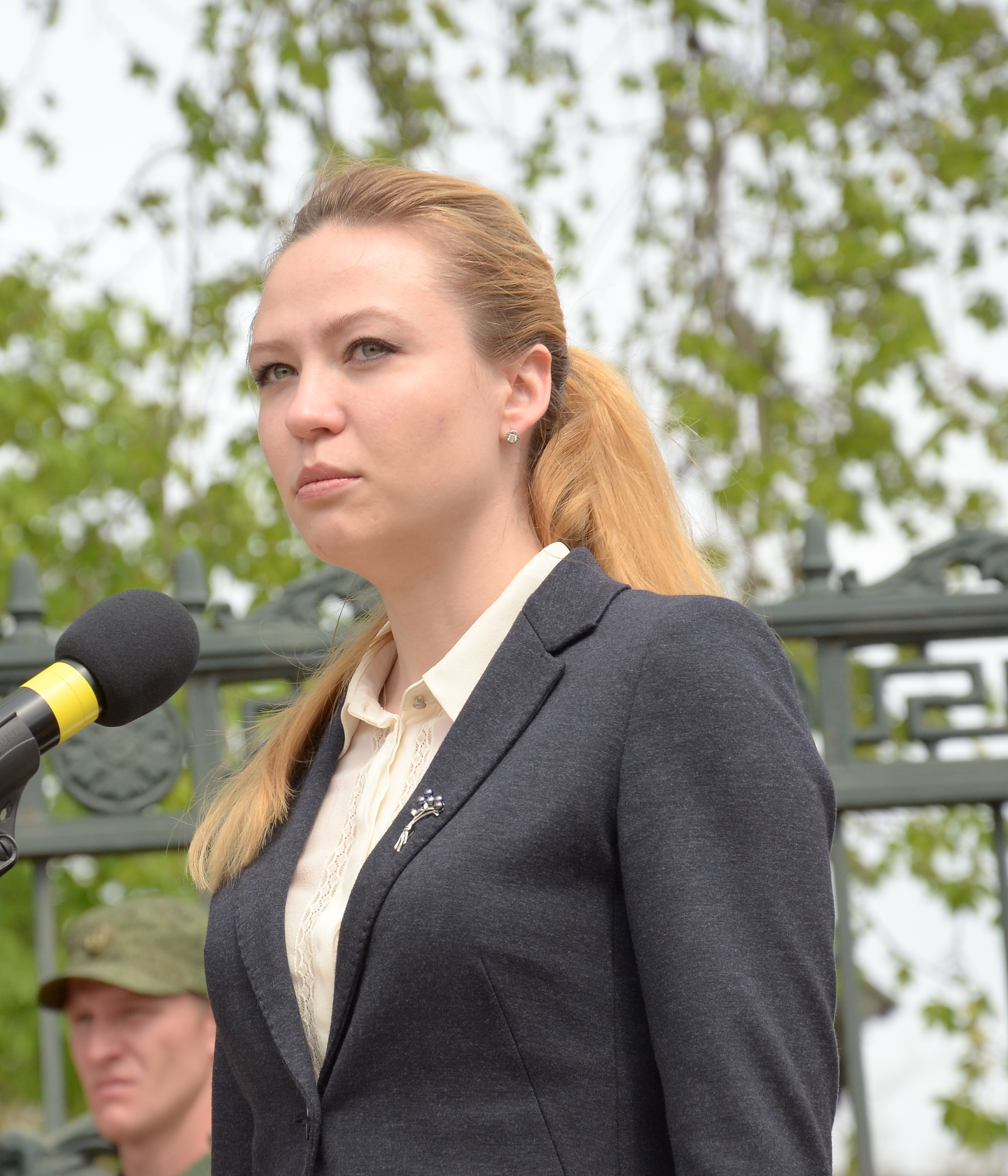
- Nikonorova in 2016

Russian Federation Senator from the Donetsk People's Republic
- Incumbent
- Assumed office 20 December 2022 Serving with Alexander Ananchenko
- Appointed by: Denis Pushilin

Minister of Foreign Affairs of the Donetsk People's Republic
- In office 23 February 2016 – 19 December 2022
- Preceded by: Aleksandr Kofman
- Succeeded by: Position abolished

Personal details
- Born: 28 September 1984 (age 42) Donetsk, Ukrainian SSR, Soviet Union (now disputed)
- Party: Donetsk Republic
- Education: Kyiv National Economic University

Natalia Yurievna Nikonorova (Russian: Наталья Юрьевна Никонорова, romanized: Natalja Jurjevna Nikonorova; Ukrainian: Наталія Юріївна Никонорова, romanized: Nataliya Yuriyivna Nykonorova; born on 28 September 1984) is a Ukrainian-Russian politician, who serves as the Russian Federation Senator from the Donetsk People's Republic since 2022. She previously served as the republic's Minister of Foreign Affairs from 2016 until its widely internationally unrecognised annexation by Russia in 2022.

As Foreign Minister, Nikonorova represented her region at the Trilateral Contact Group.

== Biography ==
=== Early life and education ===
Nikonorova was born on 28 September 1984, in Donetsk. In 2001, she graduated from High School No. 115 in Donetsk and entered the International Solomon University in Kyiv. In 2005, she moved to the Faculty of Law of the Kyiv National Economic University, graduating in 2006.

=== Career ===
From 2006 to 2012, Nikonorova worked as an assistant to Svyatoslav Piskun and Hennadiy Moskal, members of the Ukrainian Parliament. During this period, she attended the graduate school of the Koretsky KIHP, entering the Interregional Academy of Personnel Management in 2012.

During the 2014 pro-Russian unrest in Ukraine, Nikonorova backed the creation of the Donetsk People's Republic (DPR) as an independent state, and was appointed head of the legal department of the republic's newly created parliament.

In 2016, Nikonorova was appointed DPR's Minister of Foreign Affairs, with an additional role of Head of the Interdepartmental Committee for the Accreditation of Humanitarian Missions later added on. Since 2018, she has also been the permanent representative of the DPR in the Trilateral Contact Group on Ukraine, aimed at implementing the solving of the Russo-Ukrainian War.

Her position was abolished with the region's incorporation into the Russia Federation in 2022 during the Russian Invasion of Ukraine, and DPR Head Denis Pushilin subsequently appointed her as Donetsk's co-representative at the Federation Council.

== Personal life ==
Her brother Aleksey Yuryevich Nikonorov was also a lawyer working for the DPR's parliament and was involved as its representative at the Minsk Accords negotiations. Meanwhile, her mother has been involved in the electoral campaign of Donetsk Metallurgical Plant President Alexander Ryzhenkov to be elected to the Verkhovna Rada, and has worked alongside Tamara Yegorenko, Chair of the Lenin District Executive Committee of Donetsk, as well as the Rinat Akhmetov-linked Metinvest General Director Yuriy Ryzhenkov.
