= Saliou Akadiri =

Beninese politician and diplomat

Saliou Akadiri (born 1950) is a Beninese politician and diplomat who has served as Minister of Foreign Affairs of Benin from 2015 to 2016.

Hailing from Issaba, Akadiri studied in Porto Novo and completed a law degree at the National University of Benin in 1976. He served as the head of the African and European Division of the Ministry of Foreign Affairs from 1976 to 1984. He spent a year in Paris before returning to the foreign ministry until 1987, at which time he assumed the role of Ambassador to France. Akadiri served in the Organisation Internationale de la Francophonie from 1998 to 2006. He became Benin's Foreign Minister in 2015.
