= Francis Kasaila =

Malawian politician

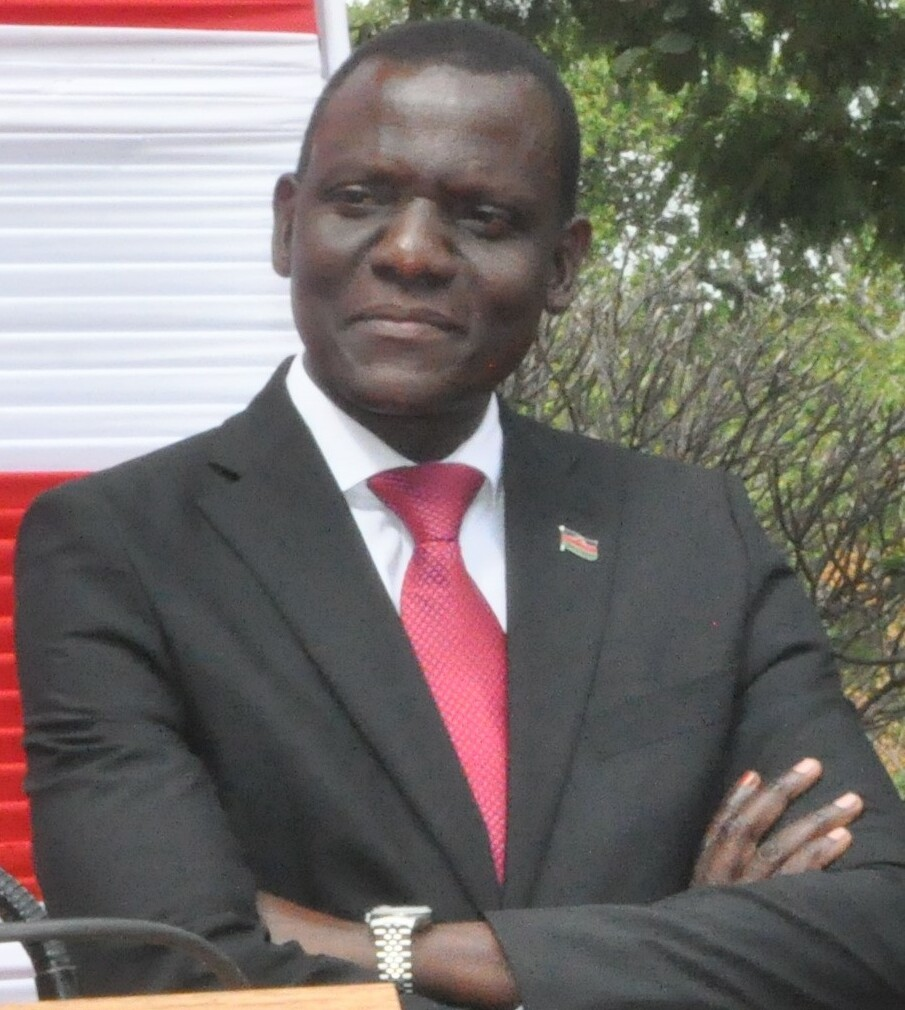

Minister of Transport and Public works of Malawi
- In office 19 June 2014 – 12 September 2019
- President: Peter Mutharika

Personal details
- Born: Malawi
- Party: Democratic Progressive Party (Malawi)

Francis Kasaila is a Malawian politician and educator. He was the Minister of Transport and Public works of Malawi, having been appointed to the position in 2014 by former president of Malawi Peter Mutharika. His term began on 19 June 2014.

Awards and achievements
Preceded by	Minister of Transport and Public works of Malawi	Succeeded by
