= Lorin S. Robert =

Micronesian politician (1956–2025)

Lorin S. Robert (May 7, 1956 – November 15, 2025) was a Micronesian politician.

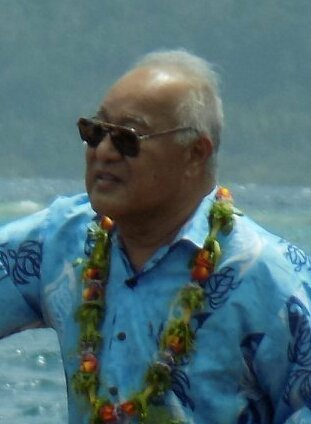
Robert in 2019

== Life and career ==
Robert was born in Chuuk on May 7, 1956. He served as Acting Secretary of Foreign Affairs from 29 June 2007 to 2019, succeeding Sebastian Anefal.

His death, at the age of 69, was announced on November 15, 2025. He died on that day.
