= Lejeune Mbella Mbella =

Cameroonian diplomat and politician (born 1949)

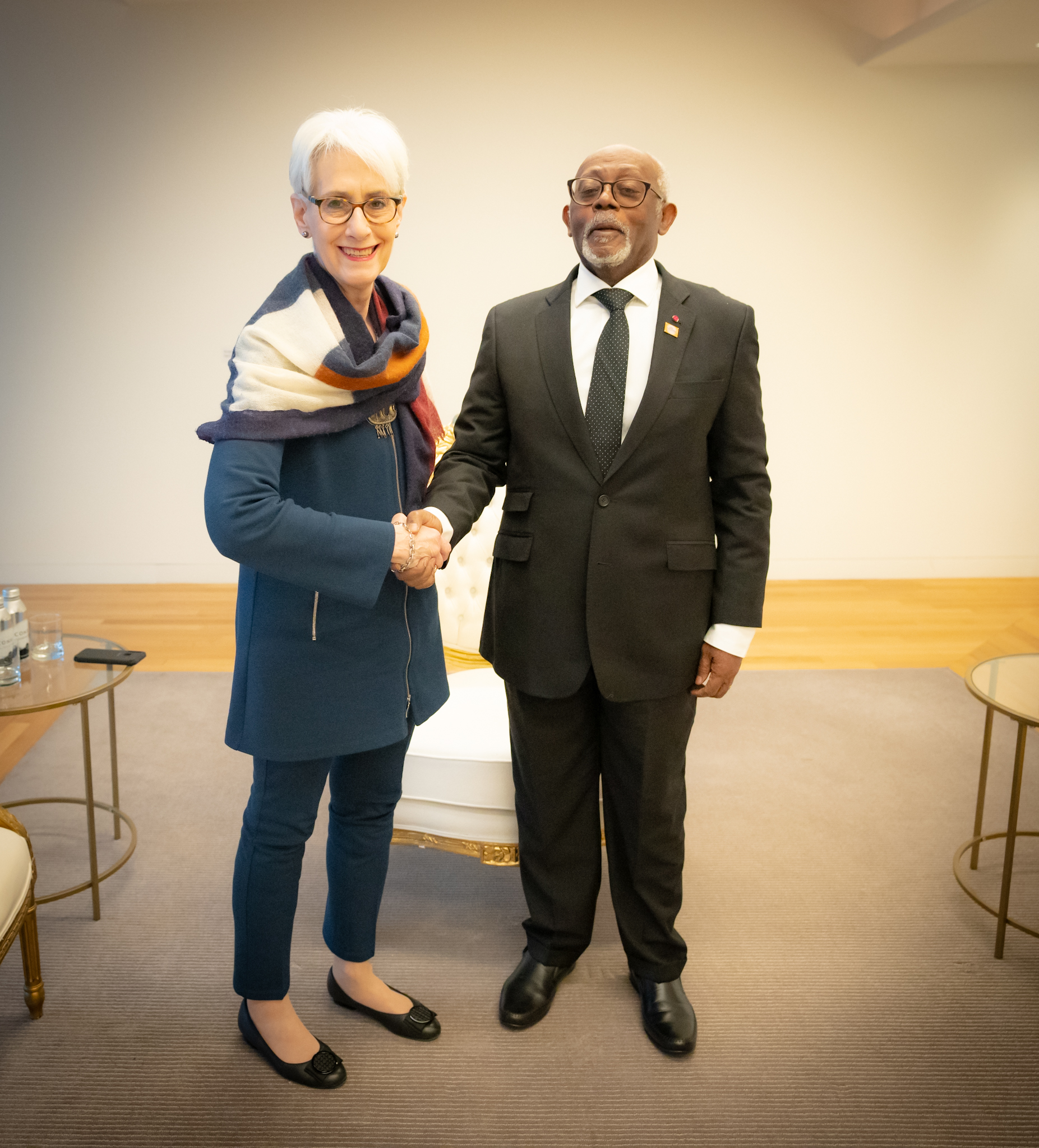
- Mbella in 2022

Minister of Foreign Affairs
- Incumbent
- Assumed office 2 October 2015
- Prime Minister: Philémon Yang; Joseph Ngute
- Preceded by: Pierre Moukoko Mbonjo

Ambassador of Cameroon to Japan and South Korea
- In office 11 October 2006 – 2 October 2015
- Succeeded by: Samuel Mvondo Ayolo

Personal details
- Born: 9 July 1949 (age 77) Nkongsamba, French Cameroon
- Party: CPDM

Lejeune Mbella Mbella (born 9 July 1949) is a Cameroonian diplomat and politician who has served as the Minister of Foreign Affairs of Cameroon since 2015.

From 2002 to 2006, he was Ambassador of Cameroon to Japan and South Korea, with residence in Tokyo. From 2006 to 2015, he was the Ambassador Extraordinary and Plenipotentiary of Cameroon to France and Portugal with residence in Paris.
