= List of foreign ministers in 2020 =

This is a list of foreign ministers in 2020.

== Africa ==
- Algeria – Sabri Boukadoum (2019–2021)
- Angola –
  1. Manuel Domingos Augusto (2017–2020)
  2. Tete António (2020–present)
- Benin – Aurélien Agbénonci (2016–present)
- Botswana –
  1. Unity Dow (2018–2020)
  2. Lemogang Kwape (2020–present)
- Burkina Faso – Alpha Barry (2016–2021)
- Burundi –
  1. Ezéchiel Nibigira (2018–2020)
  2. Albert Shingiro (2020–present)
- Cameroon - Lejeune Mbella Mbella (2015–present)
- Cape Verde – Luís Felipe Tavares (2016–2021)
- Central African Republic – Sylvie Baïpo-Temon (2018–present)
- Chad –
  1. Mahamat Zene Cherif (2017–2020)
  2. Amine Abba Sidick (2020–2021)
- Comoros –
  1. Mohamed El-Amine Souef (2017–2020)
  2. Dhoihir Dhoulkamal (2020–present)
- Congo–Brazzaville (Republic of the Congo) – Jean-Claude Gakosso (2015–present)
- Congo–Kinshasa (Democratic Republic of the Congo) – Marie Tumba Nzeza (2019–2021)
- Djibouti – Mahamoud Ali Youssouf (2005–present)
- Egypt – Sameh Shoukry (2014–present)
- Equatorial Guinea – Simeón Oyono Esono Angue (2018–present)
- Eritrea – Osman Saleh Mohammed (2007–present)
- Ethiopia –
  1. Gedu Andargachew (2019–2020)
  2. Demeke Mekonnen (2020–present)
- Gabon –
  1. Alain Claude Bilie-By-Nze (2019–2020)
  2. Pacôme Moubelet Boubeya (2020–2022)
- The Gambia – Mamadou Tangara (2018–present)
- Ghana – Shirley Ayorkor Botchway (2017–present)
- Guinea – Mamadi Touré (2017–2021)
- Guinea-Bissau –
  1. Suzi Barbosa (2019–2020)
  2. Ruth Monteiro (2020)
  3. Suzi Barbosa (2020–present)
- Ivory Coast (Côte d'Ivoire) –
  1. Marcel Amon Tanoh (acting to 2017) (2016–2020)
  2. Ally Coulibaly (2020–2021)
- Kenya –
  1. Monica Juma (2018–2020)
  2. Raychelle Omamo (2020–present)
- Lesotho –
  1. Lesego Makgothi (2017–2020)
  2. ’Matšepo Ramakoae (2020–present)
- Liberia –
  1. Gbehzohngar Findley (2018–2020)
  2. Dee-Maxwell Saah Kemayah, Sr (2020–present)
- Libya
  - Government of House of Representatives of Libya (Government of Libya internationally recognized to 2016) – Abdulhadi Elhweg (2019–2021)
  - Government of National Accord of Libya (Interim government internationally recognized as the sole legitimate government of Libya from 2016) – Mohamed Taha Siala (2016–2021)
- Madagascar –
  1. Naina Andriantsitohaina (2019–2020)
  2. Djacoba Liva Tehindrazanarivelo (2020–2021)
- Malawi –
  1. Francis Kasaila (2019–2020)
  2. Peter Mutharika (2020)
  3. Kondwani Nankhumwa (2020)
  4. Eisenhower Mkaka (2020–2022)
- Mali –
  1. Tiébilé Dramé (2019–2020)
  2. Zeïni Moulaye (2020–2021)
- Mauritania – Ismail Ould Cheikh Ahmed (2018–present)
- Mauritius – Nando Bodha (2019–2021)
- Morocco – Nasser Bourita (2017–present)
- Mozambique –
  1. José Condungua Pacheco (2017–2020)
  2. Verónica Macamo (2020–present)
- Namibia – Netumbo Nandi-Ndaitwah (2012–present)
- Niger –
  1. Kalla Ankourao (2018–2020)
  2. Marou Amadou (acting) (2020–2021)
- Nigeria – Geoffrey Onyeama (2015–present)
- Rwanda – Vincent Biruta (2019–present)
- Sahrawi Arab Democratic Republic – Mohamed Salem Ould Salek (1998–2023)
- São Tomé and Príncipe –
  1. Elsa Teixeira Pinto (2018–2020)
  2. Edite Tenjua (2020–present)
- Senegal –
  1. Amadou Ba (2019–2020)
  2. Aïssata Tall Sall (2020–present)
- Seychelles –
  1. Vincent Meriton (2018–2020)
  2. Sylvestre Radegonde (2020–2025)
- Sierra Leone – Nabeela Tunis (2019–2021)
- Somalia –
  1. Ahmed Isse Awad (2018–2020)
  2. Mohamed Abdirizak Mohamud (2020–2021)
- Somaliland –
1. Yasin Haji Mohamoud (2018–2020)
2. Essa Kayd (2020–present)
- South Africa – Naledi Pandor (2019–present)
- South Sudan –
  1. Awut Deng Acuil (2019–2020)
  2. Beatrice Wani-Noah (2020–2021)
- Sudan –
  1. Asma Mohamed Abdalla (2019–2020)
  2. Omar Ismail Gamar Aldin (acting) (2020–2021)
- Swaziland – Thuli Dladla (2018–present)
- Tanzania – Palamagamba John Aidan Mwaluko Kabudi (2019–2021)
- Togo – Robert Dussey (2013–present)
- Tunisia –
  1. Sabri Bachtabji (acting) (2019–2020)
  2. Noureddine Erray (2020)
  3. Salma Ennaifer (acting) (2020)
  4. Othman Jerandi (2020–present)
- Uganda – Sam Kutesa (2005–2021)
- Zambia – Joe Malanji (2018–2021)
- Zimbabwe – Sibusiso Moyo (2017–2021)

== Asia ==
- Abkhazia – Daur Kove (2016–2021)
- Afghanistan –
  1. Idrees Zaman (acting) (2019–2020)
  2. Haroon Chakhansuri (acting) (2020)
  3. Mohammad Hanif Atmar (2020–2021)
- Armenia –
  1. Zohrab Mnatsakanian (2018–2020)
  2. Ara Ayvazyan (2020–2021)
- Artsakh – Masis Mayilyan (2017–2021)
- Azerbaijan –
  1. Elmar Mammadyarov (2004–2020)
  2. Jeyhun Bayramov (2020–present)
- Bahrain –
  1. Sheikh Khalid ibn Ahmad Al Khalifah (2005–2020)
  2. Abdullatif bin Rashid Al Zayani (2020–present)
- Bangladesh – Abulkalam Abdul Momen (2019–present)
- Bhutan – Tandi Dorji (2018–present)
- Brunei – Hassanal Bolkiah (2015–present)
- Cambodia – Prak Sokhonn (2016–present)
- China (People's Republic of China) – Wang Yi (2013–present)
- East Timor –
  1. Dionísio Babo Soares (2018–2020)
  2. Adaljíza Magno (2020–present)
- Georgia – Davit Zalkaliani (2018–present)
- India – Subrahmanyam Jaishankar (2019–present)
- Indonesia – Retno Marsudi (2014–present)
- Iran – Mohammad Javad Zarif (2013–2021)
- Iraq –
  1. Mohamed Ali Alhakim (2018–2020)
  2. Mustafa Al-Kadhimi (acting) (2020)
  3. Fuad Hussein (2020–present)
  - Kurdistan – Safeen Muhsin Dizayee (2019–present)
- Israel –
  1. Yisrael Katz (2019–2020)
  2. Gabi Ashkenazi (2020–2021)
- Japan – Toshimitsu Motegi (2019–2021)
- Jordan – Ayman Safadi (2017–present)
- Kazakhstan – Mukhtar Tleuberdi (2019–present)
- North Korea (Democratic People's Republic of Korea) –
  1. Ri Yong-ho (2016–2020)
  2. Ri Son-gwon (2020–present)
- South Korea (Republic of Korea) – Kang Kyung-wha (2017–2021)
- Kuwait – Sheikh Ahmad Nasser Al Muhammad Al Sabah (2019–present)
- Kyrgyzstan –
  1. Chingiz Aidarbekov (2018–2020)
  2. Ruslan Kazakbayev (2020–present)
- Laos – Saleumxay Kommasith (2016–present)
- Lebanon –
  1. Gebran Bassil (2014–2020)
  2. Nassif Hitti (2020)
  3. Charbel Wehbe (2020–2021)
- Malaysia –
  1. Saifuddin Abdullah (2018–2020)
  2. Hishammuddin Hussein (2020–2021)
- Maldives – Abdulla Shahid (2018–present)
- Mongolia –
  1. Damdin Tsogtbaatar (2017–2020)
  2. Nyamtseren Enkhtaivan (2020–2021)
- Myanmar – Aung San Suu Kyi (2016–2021)
- Nepal – Pradeep Gyawali (2018–2021)
- Oman –
  1. Yusuf bin Alawi bin Abdullah (1982–2020)
  2. Badr bin Hamad Al Busaidi (2020–present)
- Pakistan – Shah Mehmood Qureshi (2018–present)
- Palestine – Riyad al-Maliki (2007–present)
- Philippines – Teodoro Locsin Jr. (2018–2022)
- Qatar – Sheikh Mohammed bin Abdulrahman Al Thani (2016–present)
- Saudi Arabia – Prince Faisal bin Farhan Al Saud (2019–present)
- Singapore – Vivian Balakrishnan (2015–present)
- South Ossetia – Dmitry Medoyev (2017–present)
- Sri Lanka – Dinesh Gunawardena (2019–2021)
- Syria (Syrian Arab Republic) –
  1. Walid Muallem (2006–2020)
  2. Faisal Mekdad (2020–present)
- Taiwan (Republic of China) – Joseph Wu (2018–present)
- Tajikistan – Sirodjidin Aslov (2013–present)
- Thailand – Don Pramudwinai (2015–present)
- Turkey – Mevlüt Çavuşoğlu (2015–present)
- Turkmenistan – Raşit Meredow (2001–present)
- United Arab Emirates – Sheikh Abdullah bin Zayed Al Nahyan (2006–present)
- Uzbekistan – Abdulaziz Komilov (2012–present)
- Vietnam – Phạm Bình Minh (2011–2021)
- Yemen
  - Republic of Yemen –
    1. Mohammed A. Al-Hadhramii (2019–2020)
    2. Ahmad Awad Bin Mubarak (2020–present)
  - Supreme Political Council (unrecognised, rival government) – Hisham Abdullah (2016–present)

== Europe ==
- Albania –
    1. Edi Rama (2019–2020)
    2. Olta Xhaçka (2020–present)
- Andorra – Maria Ubach i Font (2017–present)
- Austria – Alexander Schallenberg (2019–2021)
- Belarus
  - Belarus – Vladimir Makei (2012–present)
  - National Anti-Crisis Management (‘Shadow-government-like" organisation) - Anatoly Kotov (2020–present)
- Belgium –
  1. Philippe Goffin (2019–2020)
  2. Sophie Wilmès (2020–present)
  - Brussels - Pascal Smet (2019–present)
  - Flanders - Jan Jambon (2019–present)
  - Wallonia - Elio Di Rupo (2019–present)
- Bosnia and Herzegovina – Bisera Turković (2019–2023)
- Bulgaria – Ekaterina Zakharieva (2017–2021)
- Croatia – Gordan Grlić-Radman (2019–present)
- Cyprus – Nikos Christodoulides (2018–2022)
- Czech Republic – Tomáš Petříček (2018–2021)
- Denmark – Jeppe Kofod (2019–present)
  - Faroe Islands – Jenis av Rana (2019–present)
- Donetsk People's Republic – Natalya Nikonorova (2016–present)
- Estonia – Urmas Reinsalu (2019–2021)
- Finland – Pekka Haavisto (2019–present)
- France – Jean-Yves Le Drian (2017–present)
- Germany – Heiko Maas (2018–2021)
- Greece – Nikos Dendias (2019–present)
- Guernsey – Jonathan Le Tocq (2016–present)
- Hungary – Péter Szijjártó (2014–present)
- Iceland – Guðlaugur Þór Þórðarson (2017–2021)
- Ireland – Simon Coveney (2017–present)
- Italy – Luigi Di Maio (2019–present)
- Jersey – Ian Gorst (2018–present)
- Kosovo –
  1. Behgjet Pacolli (2017–2020)
  2. Glauk Konjufca (2020)
  3. Meliza Haradinaj-Stublla (2020–2021)
- Latvia – Edgars Rinkēvičs (2011–2023)
- Liechtenstein – Katrin Eggenberger (2019–present)
- Lithuania –
  1. Linas Antanas Linkevičius (2012–2020)
  2. Gabrielius Landsbergis (2020–present)
- Lugansk People's Republic – Vladislav Deinevo (2017–present)
- Luxembourg – Jean Asselborn (2004–present)
- Malta –
  1. Carmelo Abela (2017–2020)
  2. Evarist Bartolo (2020–present)
- Moldova –
  1. Aureliu Ciocoi (2019–2020)
  2. Oleg Țulea (2020)
  3. Aureliu Ciocoi (2020–present)
  - Gagauzia – Vitaliy Vlah (2015–present)
- Monaco – Laurent Anselmi (2019–2022)
- Montenegro –
  1. Srđan Darmanović (2016–2020)
  2. Đorđe Radulović (2020–present)
- Netherlands – Stef Blok (2018–2021)
- North Macedonia –
  1. Nikola Dimitrov (2017–2020)
  2. Bujar Osmani (2020–present)
- Northern Cyprus –
  1. Kudret Özersay (2018–2020)
  2. Tahsin Ertuğruloğlu (2020–2022)
- Norway – Ine Marie Eriksen Søreide (2017–2021)
- Poland –
  1. Jacek Czaputowicz (2018–2020)
  2. Zbigniew Rau (2020–present)
- Portugal – Augusto Santos Silva (2015–present)
- Romania – Bogdan Aurescu (2019–present)
- Russia – Sergey Lavrov (2004–present)
- San Marino –
  1. Nicola Renzi (2016–2020)
  2. Luca Beccari (2020–present)
- Serbia –
  1. Ivica Dačić (2014–2020)
  2. Ana Brnabić (acting) (2020)
  3. Nikola Selaković (2020–present)
- Slovakia –
  1. Miroslav Lajčák (2012–2020)
  2. Richard Sulík (acting) (2020)
  3. Ivan Korčok (2020–2021)
- Slovenia –
  1. Miro Cerar (2018–2020)
  2. Anže Logar (2020–present)
- Spain –
  1. Margarita Robles (acting) (2019–2020)
  2. Arancha González Laya (2020–2021)
  - Catalonia –
    1. Alfred Bosch (2018–2020)
    2. Teresa Jordà (acting) (2020)
    3. Bernat Solé (2020–2021)
- Sweden – Ann Linde (2019–present)
- Switzerland – Ignazio Cassis (2017–present)
- Transnistria – Vitaly Ignatiev (2015–present)
- Ukraine –
  1. Vadym Prystaiko (2019–2020)
  2. Dmytro Kuleba (2020–present)
- United Kingdom - Dominic Raab (2019–2021)
  - Scotland –
  1. Fiona Hyslop (2011–2020)
  2. Michael Russell (2020–2021)
- Vatican City – Archbishop Paul Gallagher (2014–present)

== North America and the Caribbean ==
- Antigua and Barbuda – E.P. Chet Greene (2018–present)
- The Bahamas – Darren Henfield (2017–2021)
- Barbados – Jerome Walcott (2018–present)
- Belize –
  1. Wilfred Elrington (2008–2020)
  2. Eamon Courtenay (2020–present)
- Canada – François-Philippe Champagne (2019–2021)
  - Quebec – Nadine Girault (2018–present)
- Costa Rica –
  1. Manuel Ventura (2019–2020)
  2. Rodolfo Solano (2020–present)
- Cuba – Bruno Rodríguez Parrilla (2009–present)
- Dominica – Kenneth Darroux (2019–present)
- Dominican Republic –
  1. Miguel Vargas Maldonado (2016–2020)
  2. Roberto Álvarez (2020–present)
- El Salvador – Alexandra Hill Tinoco (2019–present)
- Greenland –
  1. Ane Lone Bagger (2018–2020)
  2. Steen Lynge (2020–2021)
- Grenada –
  1. Peter David (2018–2020)
  2. Oliver Joseph (2020–present)
- Guatemala –
  1. Sandra Jovel (2017–2020)
  2. Pedro Brolo (2020–2022)
- Haiti –
  1. Bocchit Edmond (2018–2020)
  2. Claude Joseph (2020–2021)
- Honduras – Lisandro Rosales (2019–2022)
- Jamaica – Kamina Johnson-Smith (2016–present)
- Mexico – Marcelo Ebrard (2018–present)
- Nicaragua – Denis Moncada (2017–present)
- Panama –
  1. Alejandro Ferrer López (2019–2020)
  2. Erika Mouynes (2020–present)
- Puerto Rico –
  1. Elmer Román (2019–2020)
  2. Raúl Márquez Hernández (2020–2021)
- Saint Kitts and Nevis – Mark Brantley (2015–present)
- Saint Lucia – Allen Chastanet (2016–2021)
- Saint Vincent and the Grenadines –
  1. Sir Louis Straker (2015–2020)
  2. Ralph Gonsalves (2020–present)
- Trinidad and Tobago –
  1. Dennis Moses (2015–2020)
  2. Amery Browne (2020–present)
- United States – Mike Pompeo (2018–2021)

== Oceania ==
- Australia – Marise Payne (2018–2022)
- Cook Islands –
  1. Henry Puna (2013–2020)
  2. Mark Brown (2013–present)
- Fiji –
  1. Inia Seruiratu (2019–2020)
  2. Frank Bainimarama (2020–present)
- French Polynesia – Édouard Fritch (2014–present)
- Kiribati – Taneti Mamau (2016–present)
- Marshall Islands –
  1. John Silk (2016–2020)
  2. Casten Nemra (2020–present)
- Micronesia – Kandhi A. Elieisar (2019–present)
- Nauru – Lionel Aingimea (2019–present)
- New Zealand –
  1. Winston Peters (2017–2020)
  2. Nanaia Mahuta (2020–present)
- Niue –
  1. Toke Talagi (2008–2020)
  2. Dalton Tagelagi (2020–present)
- Palau – Faustina Rehuher-Marugg (2017–2021)
- Papua New Guinea –
  1. Patrick Pruaitch (2019–2020)
  2. Soroi Eoe (2020–2022)
- Samoa – Tuilaepa Aiono Sailele Malielegaoi (1998–2021)
- Solomon Islands – Jeremiah Manele (2019–present)
- Tokelau –
  1. Kerisiano Kalolo (2019–2020)
  2. Esera Fofō Tuisano (2020–2021)
- Tonga – Pohiva Tu'i'onetoa (2019–2021)
- Tuvalu – Simon Kofe (2019–2023)
- Vanuatu –
  1. Ralph Regenvanu (2017–2020)
  2. Mark Ati (2020–present)

== South America ==
- Argentina – Felipe Solá (2019–2021)
- Bolivia –
  1. Karen Longaric (2019–2020)
  2. Rogelio Mayta (2020–present)
- Brazil – Ernesto Araújo (2019–2021)
- Chile -
  1. Teodoro Ribera (2019–2020)
  2. Andrés Allamand (2020–2022)
- Colombia – Claudia Blum (2019–2021)
- Ecuador –
  1. José Valencia Amores (2018–2020)
  2. Luis Gallegos (2020–2021)
- Guyana –
  1. Karen Cummings (2019–2020)
  2. Hugh Todd (2020–present)
- Paraguay –
  1. Antonio Rivas Palacios (2019–2020)
  2. Federico González Franco (2020–2021)
- Peru –
  1. Gustavo Meza-Cuadra (2019–2020)
  2. Mario López Chávarri (2020)
  3. Franca Deza (2020)
  4. Elizabeth Astete (2020–2021)
- Suriname –
  1. Yldiz Pollack-Beighle (2017–2020)
  2. Albert Ramdin (2020–present)
- Uruguay –
  1. Rodolfo Nin Novoa (2015–2020)
  2. Ernesto Talvi (2020)
  3. Francisco Bustillo (2020–present)
- Venezuela – Jorge Arreaza (2017–2021)

== See also ==
- List of current foreign ministers
