= Kosovo–Tunisia relations =

Kosovar–Tunisian relations
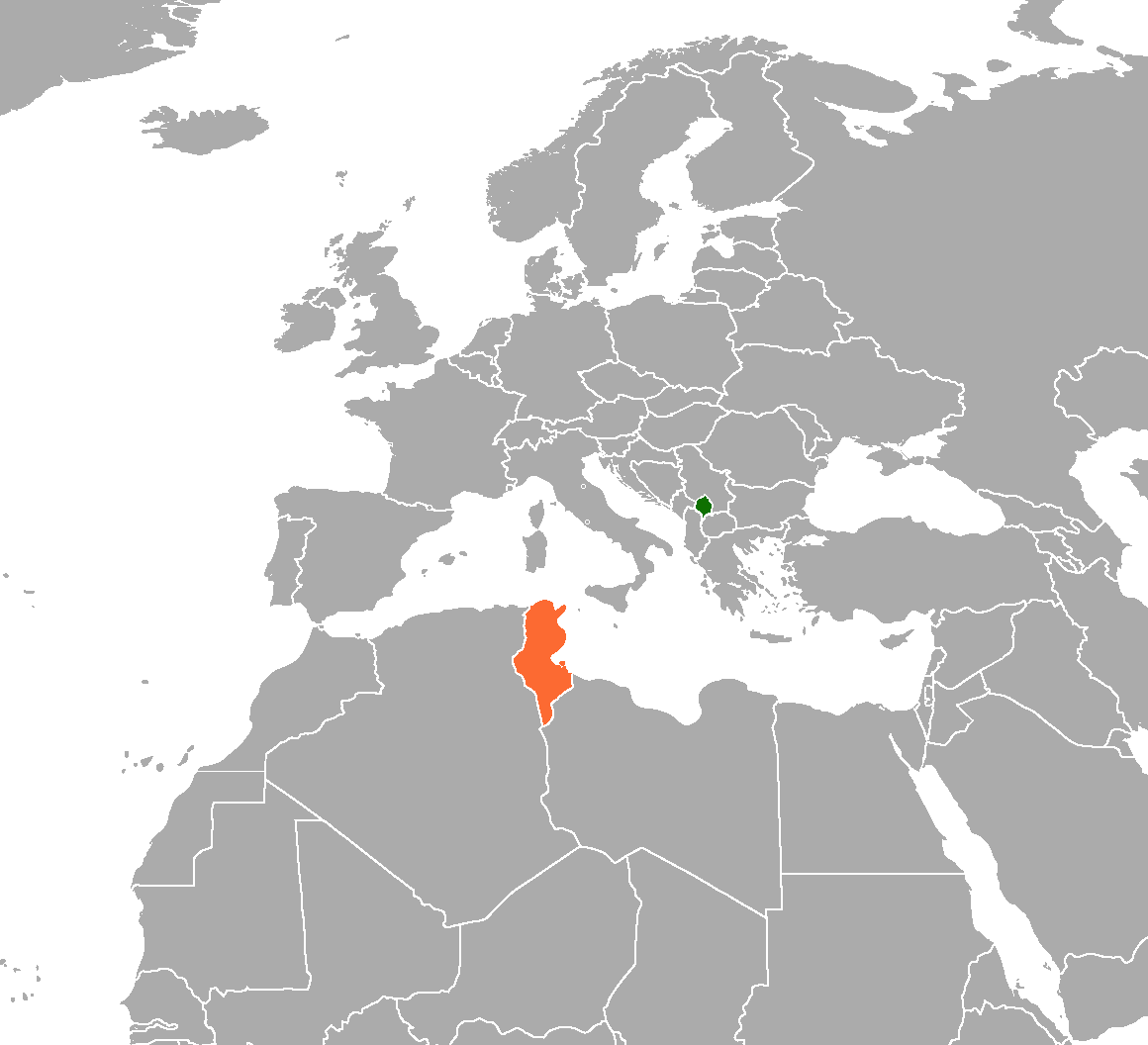
- Kosovo: Tunisia

Kosovar–Tunisian relations are foreign relations between Kosovo and Tunisia. There are no formal diplomatic relations between Tunisia and Kosovo as Tunisia has not recognized Kosovo as a sovereign state.

== History ==
At a meeting on 28 May 2009 with Kosovo's Foreign Minister, Skënder Hyseni, the representative of Tunisia to the United Nations, Jalel Snoussi, reportedly said that he would inform the Tunisian authorities of Kosovo's request for recognition. In November 2009, the Ambassador of Tunisia to Serbia, Houria Ferchichi, said that Tunisia supports Serbia's commitment to a peaceful and compromised solution of the Kosovo issue through the UN, and the efforts of Serbian diplomacy in that direction.

In a September 2010 meeting between the Foreign Ministers of Kosovo and Tunisia, Skënder Hyseni and Kamel Morjane, Morjane said that Tunisia would take the opinion of the International Court of Justice very seriously, and would review Kosovo's request for recognition in government.

In an August 2011 meeting with Kosovo's First deputy prime minister, Behgjet Pacolli, the leader of the Ennahda Movement, Rashid al-Ghannushi, "guaranteed Tunisia would recognize Kosovo if his party won the elections". On 29 October 2011, following a meeting with representatives of Ennahda Movement, Pacolli reported that Tunisia was expected to recognise Kosovo following the forthcoming elections.

At a meeting in October 2012 with Albanian Foreign Minister and Chairman of the Committee of Ministers of the Council of Europe, Edmond Panariti, the Tunisian Foreign Minister, Rafik Abdessalem, said that his government was seriously considering the issue of the recognition of Kosovo.

In January 2013, Abdessalem stressed that the decision to recognise Kosovo was in the final stages and that it was only a matter of time before this occurs, while prime minister Hamadi Jebali stated that there were no obstacles to recognition. However, in late February Serbian media sources reported that the Tunisian ambassador to Serbia, Majid Hamlaoui, suggested that Tunisia would not recognise Kosovo, despite outside pressure for recognition.

In November 2022, Kosovo President Vjosa Osmani formally met Tunisian President Kais Saied at the 18th Organisation de la Francophonie summit in Djerba, Tunisia.

== See also ==
- Foreign relations of Kosovo
- Foreign relations of Tunisia
