= Kang Kyung-wha =

South Korean politician and diplomat (born 1955)

Her Excellency Kang Kyung-wha
- 강경화
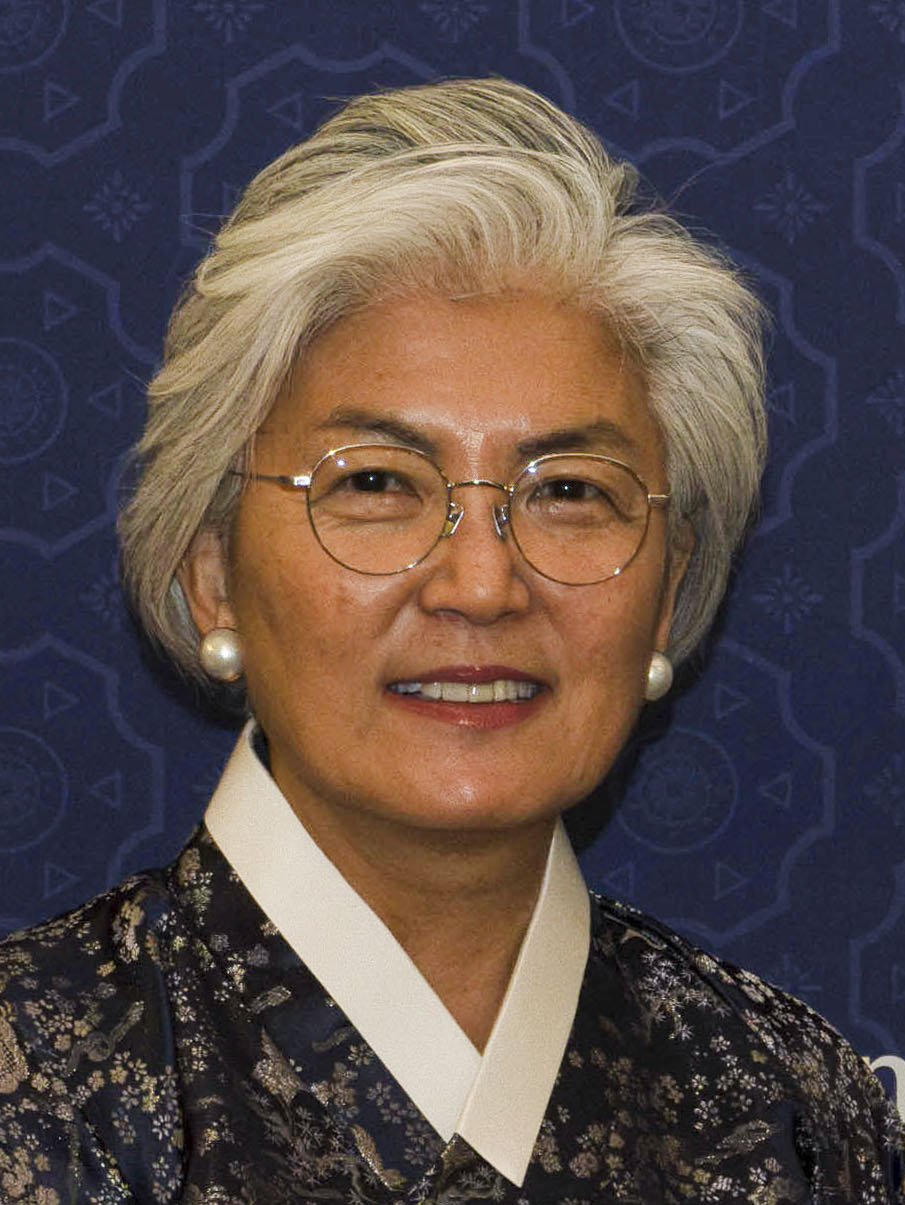
- Kang in 2025

29th South Korean ambassador to the United States
- Incumbent
- Assumed office 6 October 2025
- President: Lee Jae Myung
- Preceded by: Cho Hyun-dong

36th Minister of Foreign Affairs
- In office June 18, 2017 – February 8, 2021
- President: Moon Jae-in
- Prime Minister: Lee Nak-yon; Chung Sye-kyun
- Preceded by: Yun Byung-se
- Succeeded by: Chung Eui-yong

Personal details
- Born: April 7, 1955 (age 71) Seoul, South Korea
- Spouse: Lee Yill-byung
- Children: 3
- Education: Yonsei University (BA); University of Massachusetts, Amherst (MA, PhD)
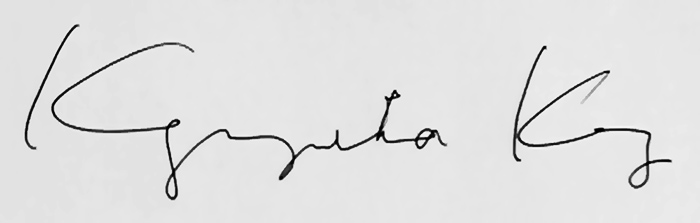
- Signature

Korean name
- Hangul: 강경화
- Hanja: 康京和
- RR: Gang Gyeonghwa
- MR: Kang Kyŏnghwa

Kang Kyung-wha (Korean: 강경화; born April 7, 1955) is a South Korean diplomat and politician who was the first female Foreign Minister of South Korea under President Moon Jae-in from 2017 to 2021 as well as the first woman nominated for and appointed to the position. She is also the first South Korean woman to hold a high-level position in the United Nations. Previously, Kang was the first non-exam-taker to become a director-general at the ministry. She is the first South Korean foreign minister to join the official South Korean delegation for the inter-Korean summit as well as to visit Pyongyang. Kang served as the president and CEO of the Asia Society, until she stepped down in October 2025 to become the 29th ambassador of South Korea to the United States.

== Early life and education ==
Kang was born in Seoul, South Korea. Her father, born in Pyongyang, North Korea, was a famous announcer at South Korea's Korean Broadcasting System as well as a member of its second board of directors. Her family moved to Washington, D.C. following her father's career at Voice of America in 1964 and came back to Seoul after two years.

Kang attended Ewha Girls' High School in Seoul. She graduated from Yonsei University with a Bachelor of Arts in Political Science and Diplomacy. She obtained an M.A. in mass communication and a Ph.D. with a dissertation on intercultural communication from the University of Massachusetts Amherst, United States.

== Career ==
=== Early career ===
Early in her career, Kang worked for the Korean Broadcasting System as a producer of English Service Division of Radio Korea. As an associate professor, she lectured at Cleveland State University in Ohio and Sejong University in Seoul. Between and after her career in academia, she assisted several speakers of the National Assembly of South Korea on global issues in human rights, advancement of women and parliamentary diplomacy as presidential secretary for international relations and an interpreter.

She was also active in women's organizations in South Korea, serving as the spokeswoman of the Korean Women's NGO Committee for the Beijing Conference in 1995, member of the International Relations Committee of the Korean National Council of Women, and director of Korean Institute for Women and Politics.

=== Ministry of Foreign Affairs and Trade ===
In 1998 Kang joined the Korean Foreign Service, without ever having passed the Foreign Service Exam, as the acting Senior Research Officer of Foreign Ministry's Institute of Foreign Affairs and National Security. In 1999 she was specially employed as Senior Advisor and Principal Speechwriter to the Foreign Minister and Principal Interpreter to the President. While working as the president's interpreter for three years, she gained then-President Kim's confidence due to her interpretation during his phone call with U.S. president Clinton.

From September 2001 to July 2005, Kang was Minister-Counselor and later Minister at Permanent Mission of the Republic of Korea to the United Nations. During that time, she chaired the Commission on the Status of Women for its 48th and 49th session. Before and after working at the Permanent Mission, she worked as Deputy Director-General and Director General for the International Organisations of the Foreign Ministry. Later, she was appointed Ambassador-at-Large for Global Affairs of the Ministry.

=== United Nations ===
Kang held key roles in the United Nations under three consecutive Secretaries-General, from Kofi Annan and Ban Ki-moon to the current officeholder, Antonio Guterres. In September 2006, Kofi Annan appointed her as Deputy High Commissioner for Human Rights, equivalent to Assistant Secretary-General, after seeing her potential when she chaired the UN commission on women. She was appointed by Ban Ki-moon as Deputy Emergency Relief Coordinator and Assistant Secretary-General for the Office for the Coordination of Humanitarian Affairs in March 2013. In October 2016, she was appointed by then-Secretary-General-elect, António Guterres as Chief of the Secretary-General-designate's Transition Team. Later in February 2017, she continued to work with Secretary-General Guterres as his Senior Advisor on Policy, equivalent to Under-Secretary-General, before resigning for the foreign minister of South Korea.

=== Cabinet ===
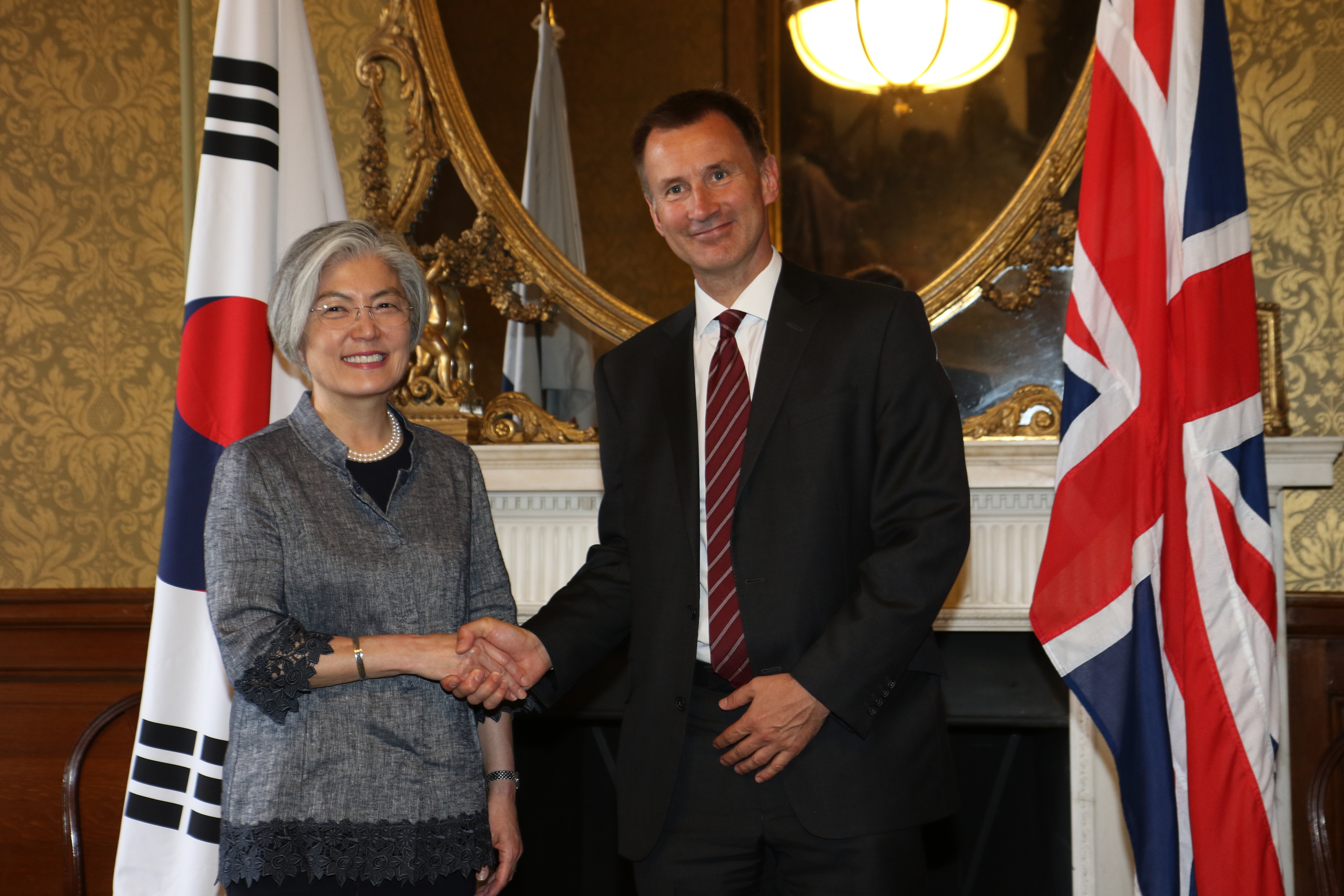
Kang with British Foreign Secretary Jeremy Hunt in 2018

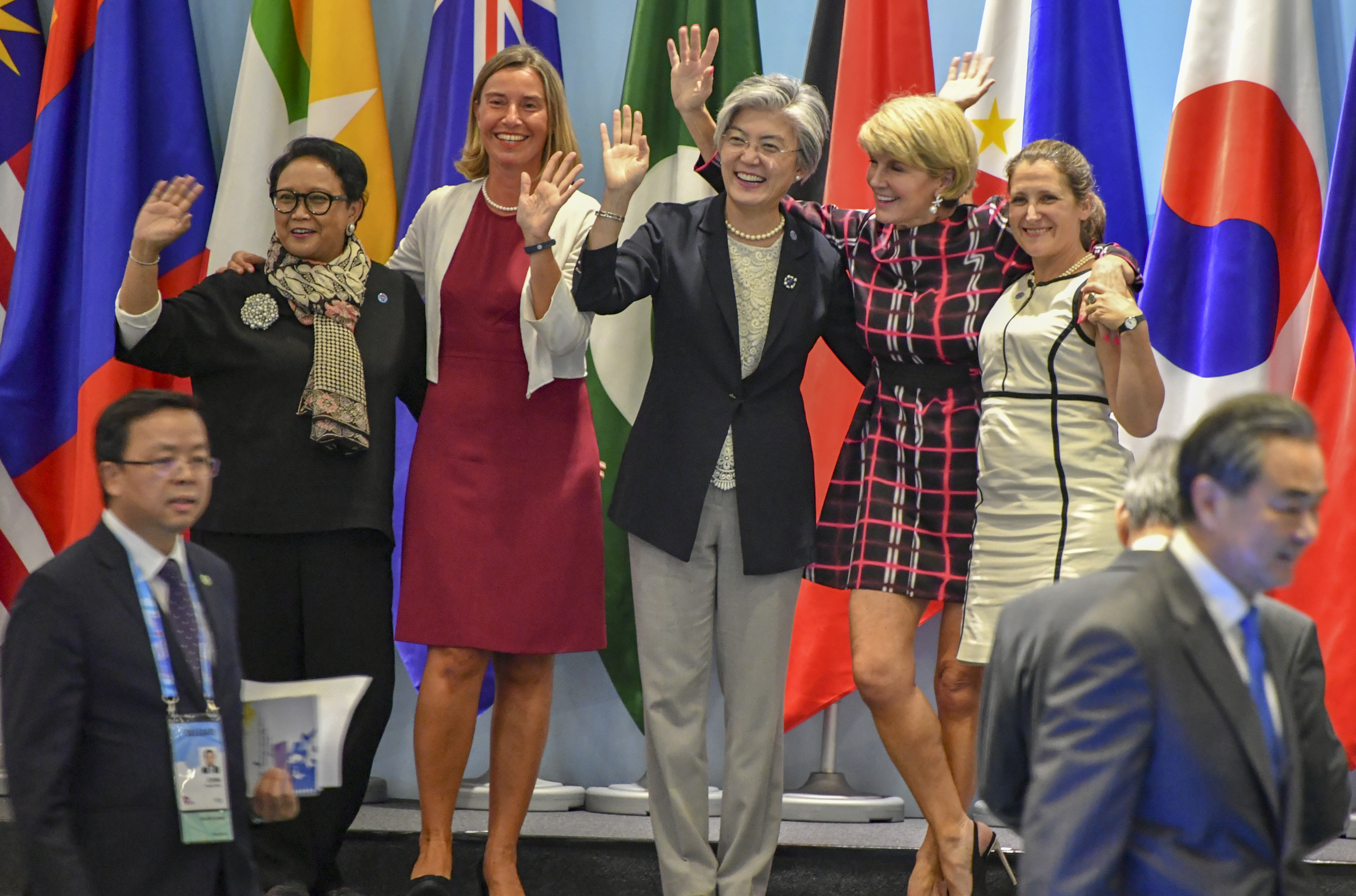
Kang with Retno Marsudi, Federica Mogherini, Julie Bishop, and Chrystia Freeland at the ASEAN Regional Forum Retreat in Singapore on August 4, 2018

After an announcement of her nomination by the Blue House in May 2017, Kang faced hard opposition from the opposition parties before and during her nomination hearing at the National Assembly due to allegations, such as address fraud and the nationality of her oldest daughter. Opposition was partly composed of claims that she lacks experience dealing directly with global powers - the U.S. in particular. During her hearing, she asked for understanding given that she was unable to manage her children in detail as a working parent, did not share finances with her husband to support her parents as their oldest child, and lived abroad for a long time. With public statements of support from a trade union of the Ministry, Japanese military sex slaves, or widely known as "comfort women", Korea NGO Council for Overseas Development Cooperation, and her eleven predecessors, respectively, along with the public support of 60% and more, President Moon appointed her as his first foreign minister, a post that requires a nomination hearing but not the expressed approval from the legislature, in June 2017. With her and other female cabinet members, President Moon was able to keep his election promise to fill over 30% of his cabinet with women.

During her talks with Hansung University students, she revealed that she had never met President Moon in person before her conferment ceremony at the Blue House.

She is the third head of the ministry to attend the high-level segment of the regular sessions of the Human Rights Council after her predecessors Ban Ki-moon and Yun Byung-se. As of 2019 she is the first Korean foreign minister to make keynote speech at every regular session of the Council during their tenure.

Because of the COVID-19 pandemic, Israel has imposed an entry ban on South Koreans and foreign tourists who stayed in South Korea in the past 14 days. Kang described Israel's response as "excessive".

As of December 2020, Kang is the only cabinet minister - and one of four at a ministerial level along with Hong Nam-ki, Suh Hoon and Kim Sang-jo - to continue to serve President Moon from the beginning of his presidency in 2017. On January 20, 2021, President Moon nominated his first director of National Security Office, Chung Eui-yong, to replace Kang.

=== Post-cabinet ===
In February 2021, Kang became the last member of President Moon's first cabinet formed in 2017 to be replaced after more than three and a half years. A month later, she joined Park Young-sun's campaign in Seoul mayoral by-election as its chair of international cooperation committee.

In August 2021, Kang was appointed a distinguished professor emeritus at the Graduate School of International Studies at Ewha Womans University, the first university she visited as the country's foreign minister in 2018.

In October 2021, Kang announced her candidacy for the next Secretary General of the International Labour Organization. In the final vote, she came in fourth; the position eventually went to Houngbo.

=== South Korean ambassador to the United States ===
On 1 October 2025, Kang was appointed by president Lee Jae Myung as South Korea's ambassador to the United States.

== Affiliations ==
- Asia Society, President (April 2024 until October 2025)
- International Crisis Group (ICG), Board of Trustees (since 2023)

== Personal life ==
She is married to Lee Yill-byung, an emeritus professor of computer science at Yonsei University, and has three children: two daughters and a son. In 2000, when Kang moved to Seoul from the US, she illegally forged her residency to get her daughter to attend a prestigious high school in Seoul. In 2017 she admitted to this address fraud, but the statute of limitation for such a misdemeanor had already expired.

== Awards ==
- Special Award at the 11th Annual Korea Women Leaders Awards by the Young Women's Christian Association of Korea (2013)
- Order of Service Merit by the government of South Korea (2006)
- Woman of the Year Award by the Korean National Council of Women (2006)

== See also ==
- List of foreign ministers in 2017
- List of foreign ministers in 2018
- List of foreign ministers in 2019
- List of foreign ministers in 2020
- List of foreign ministers in 2021
- List of female foreign ministers

Political offices
Preceded by Yun Byung-se	Minister of Foreign Affairs; 2017–2021	Succeeded by Chung Eui-yong
