= Ministry of Foreign Affairs (Tunisia) =

Government minister of Tunisia

Ministry of Foreign Affairs of Tunisia
- وزارة الشؤون الخارجية; Ministère des Affaires étrangères
- Coat of Arms of Tunisia

Agency overview
- Formed: 1956
- Jurisdiction: Government of Tunisia
- Headquarters: Avenue de la Ligue des Etats Arabes, Nord Hilton 1030 Tunis
- Agency executive: Mohamed Ali Nafti, Minister of Foreign Affairs of Tunisia
- Website: www.diplomatie.gov.tn

The Ministry of Foreign Affairs of Tunisia (Arabic: وزارة الشؤون الخارجية, French: Ministère des Affaires étrangères) is a cabinet-level governmental agency in Tunisia in charge of conducting and designing the foreign policy of the country.

== Organization and structure ==
The Ministry of Foreign Affairs of Tunisia seeks to implement the government's foreign policy in conformity with the policies fixed by the head of state establishing, maintaining and developing Tunisia's partnership with foreign states and international institutions and organizations in the political, economic, social and cultural spheres.

The ministry is divided into several departments:

- The State Secretariat in charge of European Affairs;
- The State Secretariat in charge of American and Asian Affairs;
- The State Secretariat in charge of Maghrebi, Arab and African Affairs;
- The Office of the Minister;
- The General Inspectorate;
- The General Secretariat;
- The General Directorate of Political, Economic Affairs and Cooperation with the Arab World and Arab and Islamic Organizations;
- The General Directorate of Political, Economic Affairs and Cooperation for Europe and the European Union;
- The General Directorate of Political, Economic Affairs and Cooperation for the Americas, Pacific Asia and American and Asian Regional Organizations;
- The General Directorate of Political, Economic Affairs and Cooperation for Africa and the African Union;
- The General Directorate of International Organizations and Conferences;
- The General Directorate of Consular Affairs;
- The Directorate of Diplomatic Protocol;
- The Directorate of Information;
- Units of study and research.

The ministry is headed by the Minister of Foreign Affairs of Tunisia, currently, Mohamed Ali Nafti.

== List of ministers ==
- Habib Bourguiba (April 15, 1956 – July 29, 1957)
- Sadok Mokaddem (July 29, 1957 – August 29, 1962)
- Mongi Slim (August 29, 1962 – November 12, 1964)
- Habib Bourguiba Jr. (November 12, 1964 – June 12, 1970)
- Mohamed Masmoudi (June 12, 1970 – January 14, 1974)
- Habib Chatty (January 14, 1974 – December 24, 1977)
- Muhammad Fitouri (December 24, 1977 – April 15, 1980)
- Hassen Belkhodja (April 15, 1980 – April 15, 1981)
- Beji Caid Essebsi (April 15, 1981 – September 15, 1986)
- Hédi Mabrouk (September 15, 1986 – November 7, 1987)
- Mahmoud Mestiri (November 7, 1987 – November 7, 1988)
- Abdelhamid Escheikh (November 7, 1988 – March 3, 1990)
- Ismail Khelil (March 3, 1990 – August 28, 1990)
- Habib Boularès (August 28, 1990 – February 20, 1991)
- Habib Ben Yahia (February 20, 1991 – January 22, 1997)
- Abderrahim Zouari (January 22, 1997 – December 1997)
- Saïd Ben Mustapha (December 1997 – November 11, 1999)
- Habib Ben Yahia (November 11, 1999 – November 10, 2004)
- Abdelbaki Hermassi (November 10, 2004 – August 17, 2005)
- Abdelwahab Abdallah (August 17, 2005 – January 14, 2010)
- Kamel Morjane (January 14, 2010 – January 27, 2011)
- Ahmed Ounaies (January 27, 2011 – February 21, 2011)
- Mouldi Kefi (February 21, 2011 – December 23, 2011)
- Rafik Abdessalem (December 23, 2011 – March 14, 2013)
- Othman Jerandi (March 14, 2013 – January 28, 2014)
- Mongi Hamdi (January 28, 2014 – February 5, 2015)
- Taïeb Baccouche (February 5, 2015 – January 6, 2016)
- Khemaies Jhinaoui (January 6, 2016 – October 29, 2019)
- Sabri Bachtabji (October 29, 2019 – February 27, 2020) (acting)
- Noureddine Erray (February 27, 2020 – July 24, 2020)
- Salma Ennaifer (July 24, 2020 – September 2, 2020) (acting)
- Othman Jerandi (September 2, 2020 – February 7, 2023)
- Nabil Ammar (February 7, 2023 – August 25, 2024)
- Mohamed Ali Nafti (August 25, 2024 - Present)

== See also ==
- Foreign relations of Tunisia
- Government of Tunisia
