= Dorah =

Dorah may refer to:

== People ==
- Dorah Grow, 1960s American politician
- Dorah Ilunga (born 1968), Belgian politician
- Dora Kotzee, sometimes misspelled Dorah, 21st century South African politician
- Dorah or Dora Mwima (born 1990), Ugandan model and Miss Uganda 2008

== Other uses ==
- Dorah Pass, Afghanistan, a mountain pass
- Dorah (1816 ship), a British ship which sailed between Britain and India

== See also ==
- Dora (disambiguation)
