= Minister of Foreign Affairs (Panama) =

Panamaian government office

Minister of Foreign Affairs of Panama
- Ministro de Relaciones Exteriores de Panamá
- Coat of arms of Panama
- Incumbent; Javier Martínez-Acha since July 1, 2024
- Ministerio de Relaciones Exteriores (Panamá)
- Style: Mr./Madam Minister (Señor/a Ministro/a) (informal); Chancellor (Canciller) (informal); The Most Excellent (Excelentísimo/a Señor/a) (diplomatic); His/Her Excellency (Su Excelencia) (diplomatic)
- Reports to: The president of Panama
- Seat: Palacio Bolívar
- Appointer: The president of Panamá
- Term length: No fixed term
- Website: mire.gob.pa (in Spanish)

The Minister of Foreign Affairs of Panama is the public official who heads the Ministry of Foreign Affairs of Panama. Its head is appointed by and may be freely removed by the President of the Republic and is a member of the Council of Ministers.

== List ==
This is a list of foreign ministers of Panama from 1945 to the present day.

- 1941–1944: Octavio Fábrega López
- 1945–1947: Horacio F. Alfaro
- 1947–1948: Mario de Diego
- 1948............ Ernesto Jaén Guardia
- 1948–1949: Ignacio Carlos Molino de Diego
- 1949............ Samuel Lewis Arango
- 1949............ Guillermo Méndez Pereira
- 1949–1951: Carlos N. Brin
- 1951–1952: Ignacio Carlos Molino de Diego
- 1952–1955: José Ramón Guizado
- 1955............ Octavio Fábrega López
- 1955............ Ricardo Arias
- 1955–1956: Alberto A. Boyd
- 1956–1958: Aquilino Boyd
- 1958–1960: Miguel J. Moreno
- 1960–1964: Galileo Solís
- 1964–1968: Fernando Eleta Almarán
- 1968–1969: Carlos Alfredo López Guevara
- 1969............ Nander Antberto Pitty Velásquez
- 1969–1976: Juan Antonio Tack
- 1976–1977: Aquilino Boyd
- 1977–1978: Nicolás González Revilla
- 1978–1981: Carlos Ozores Typaldos
- 1981–1982: Jorge Illueca
- 1982–1983: Juan José Amado
- 1983–1984: Oydén Ortega Durán
- 1984–1985: Fernando Cardoze
- 1985–1988: Jorge Abadía Arias
- 1988–1989: Jorge Eduardo Ritter
- 1989............ Gustavo R. González
- 1989............ Leonardo Kam
- 1989–1993: Julio Linares
- 1993–1994: José Raúl Mulino
- 1994–1996: Gabriel Lewis Galindo
- 1996–1998: Ricardo Alberto Arias
- 1998–1999: Jorge Eduardo Ritter
- 1999–2003: José Miguel Alemán
- 2003–2004: Harmodio Arias Cerjack
- 2004–2009: Samuel Lewis Navarro
- 2009–2011: Juan Carlos Varela
- 2011–2012: Roberto Henríquez
- 2012............ Francisco Álvarez De Soto (acting)
- 2012–2013: Rómulo Roux
- 2013–2014: Fernando Núñez Fábrega
- 2014............ Francisco Álvarez De Soto
- 2014–2019: Isabel Saint Malo
- 2019–2020: Alejandro Ferrer López
- 2020–2022: Erika Mouynes
- 2022–2024: Janaina Tewaney
- 2024–: Javier Martínez-Acha

== Sources ==
- Rulers.org – Foreign ministers L–R
