= Ilunga =

Given name

Ilunga is a personal name in the Democratic Republic of the Congo.

In June 2004, "ilunga" was reported as being a Tshiluba word meaning "a person who is ready to forgive any abuse for the first time, to tolerate it a second time, but never a third time", and – in the opinion of 1,000 linguists surveyed on the subject – the world's most difficult word to translate.

== Ilunga as a family name ==
Ilunga is a family name placed before the given name. There are many famous African and African-descended people named Ilunga. For example:

- Kalala Ilunga, legendary founder of the Luba ethnic group of Democratic Republic of Congo
- Sylvestre Ilunga, appointed as the Prime Minister of the Democratic Republic of the Congo in May 2019-
- Didier Ilunga-Mbenga, basketball, Congo, joined Dallas Mavericks in July 2004
- Dorah Ilunga Kabulu, politician, Belgium
- Eddy Kamuanga Ilunga, artist, Democratic Republic of Congo
- Hérita Ilunga, footballer, Democratic Republic of Congo
- Masengo Ilunga, former footballer of Ethnikos Piraeus born in Zaire.
- Ilunga Mwepu, Congolese footballer
- Kasongo Ilunga, Congolese politician

== See also ==
- Words hardest to translate
