= Erika Mouynes =

Panamanian politician (born 1977)

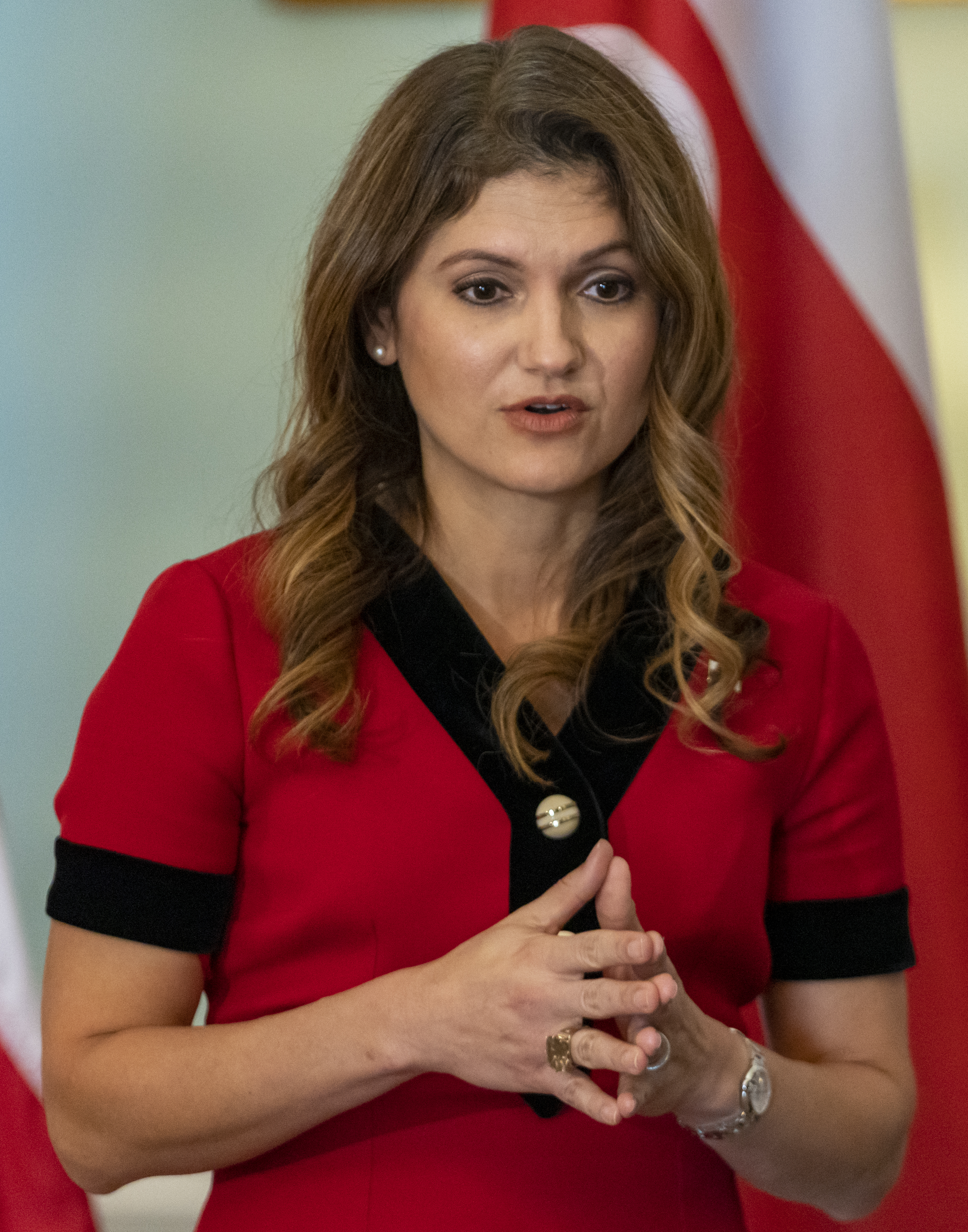
- Mouynes in 2022

Minister of Foreign Affairs
- In office 2 December 2020 – 10 October 2022
- Preceded by: Alejandro Ferrer López
- Succeeded by: Janaina Tewaney

Personal details
- Born: 24 November 1977 (age 48)
- Education: Bachelor's degree in Law and Political Sciences – Universidad Católica Santa María La Antigua; Bachelor of Business Administration – Latin American University of Science and Technology; LLM in Corporate Law – New York University School of Law; LLM in International Law – UC Berkeley School of Law
- Committees: Advisory Board, Smithsonian Tropical Research Institute; Advisory Council, Atlantic Council Adrienne Arsht Latin America Center

Erika Mouynes (born 24 November 1977) is a Panamanian diplomat, lawyer, and business executive. Mouynes served as the 62nd Minister of Foreign Affairs of Panama from December 2020 to October 2022. Her tenure focused on irregular migration through the Darién Gap, climate diplomacy, and Panama's COVID-19 vaccine procurement.

Mouynes sits on the advisory board of the Smithsonian Tropical Research Institute and was a Resident Fellow at the Harvard Institute of Politics in Spring 2024. She is a member of the Atlantic Council Adrienne Arsht Latin America Center Advisory Council and was a 2023 fellow of the Harvard University Advanced Leadership Initiative.

Before entering government, Mouynes worked in the private sector, including as an attorney at Shearman & Sterling LLP and as Chief Legal Officer and General Counsel at Fintech Advisory.

== Early life and education ==
Mouynes was born in Panama. She completed her undergraduate education in Panama, earning a bachelor's degree in law and political sciences from Santa Maria la Antigua Catholic University and a bachelor's degree in business administration from the Latin American University of Science and Technology. Mouynes pursued further education in the United States as a Fulbright scholar, undertaking postgraduate studies in business at the New York University Stern School of Business and a Master of Laws (LLM) in Corporate Law from New York University School of Law, and an LLM in International Law from UC Berkeley School of Law.

== Career ==
=== Private sector ===
Mouynes began her career practicing law in Panama. She was an attorney in project finance at the New York City office of Shearman & Sterling. She then worked as General Counsel and Chief Legal Officer of the investment company Fintech Advisory from 2013 to 2017. In 2017, Mouynes also became a partner at Pixbae, a Panama-based advisory firm working in fintech.

In 2015, Mouynes was named to the Association of Corporate Counsel's Top 10 30-Somethings.

=== Earlier government service ===
Mouynes served as Chief of Staff of the Ministry of Commerce and Industries from 2004 and as Vice Minister of Multilateral Affairs and Cooperation from 2019 to 2020. She participated in work related to the U.S.-Panama Free Trade Agreement.

=== Minister of Foreign Affairs ===
Appointed by then President Laurentino Cortizo on 2 December 2020, Mouynes succeeded Alejandro Ferrer as Minister of Foreign Affairs and served until October 2022. During her tenure, the ministry addressed issues including climate change, digital inclusion, irregular migration, and gender equality. As foreign minister, she oversaw Panama's COVID-19 vaccine procurement, with the country's first doses arriving in early 2021. During this period, Panama helped launch an alliance of carbon-negative countries alongside Bhutan and Suriname, and signed an agreement with Colombia, Costa Rica, and Ecuador to expand the Eastern Tropical Pacific Marine Corridor.

One of the central issues during Mouynes's tenure was migration through the Darién Gap. Crossings rose sharply in 2021: by August, more than 50,000 migrants had taken the jungle route, roughly two and a half times a typical year's total. Mouynes said Panama was funding migrant reception centers from its own budget and had run out of money. She convened a regional ministerial summit with counterparts from across the Americas, which led to a working group on humanitarian needs and the root causes of migration. In April 2022, she met U.S. Secretary of State Antony Blinken and Homeland Security Secretary Alejandro Mayorkas in Panama City. The two countries signed a bilateral migration arrangement covering regional migration management, stabilization, and legal pathways for migrants. A month later, she said daily crossings had fallen 94 percent from their peak.

As foreign minister, Mouynes spoke on sustainability and gender equality at the 2021 Concordia Annual Summit, the 2022 ECLAC Forum on Sustainable Development, and the Center for Strategic and International Studies Smart Women, Smart Power Conversation.

Mouynes was succedeed by Janaina Tewaney in October 2022.

=== After government ===
Since leaving office, Mouynes has worked as a geopolitical and investment strategy adviser. Mouynes sits on the advisory board of the Smithsonian Tropical Research Institute. She was a Resident Fellow at the Harvard Institute of Politics in Spring 2024, where she led a study group on trust in political systems. She previously served as Chair of the Advisory Council of the Atlantic Council Adrienne Arsht Latin America Center and remains a member of the Council.

== Selected publications ==
- Mouynes, Erika. Iran war shows Latin America has left its original sin behind. Financial Times, April 2026
- Mouynes, Erika. A New Corporate Playbook for Navigating Political Uncertainty in Latin America. Harvard Business Review, November 2024
- Mouynes, Erika. There must be more to US relations with Latin America than immigration. Financial Times, March 2024
- Mouynes, Erika. In Search of Confidence to Govern. UNO Magazine, July 2023
- Mouynes, Erika. No Puede Haber Democracia sin Confianza (“Mea Culpa”) (No Democracy without Trust). El Pais, September 2022
- Mouynes, Erika, and Meghan Lopez. Rethinking Migration in Latin America. Project Syndicate. February 2022
- Mouynes, Erika. Without Women Leaders, We Won’t Have The Bold and Concrete Climate Actions Our Planet Requires. Ms. Magazine. December 2021
- Mouynes, Erika. The (Literal) Gap in U.S. Migration Policy. Foreign Policy. June 2021
