= Centre for Strategic and Diplomatic Studies =

English-based research institute

Coordinates: 51.5063°N 0.1341°W

- مركز الدراسات الإستراتيجية والديبلوماسية
- Formation: 2014
- Founder: Rafik Abdessalem Bouachlaka
- Type: Research institution
- Purpose: Tunisian domestic and international politics, regional security, economics, diplomacy
- Location: London; Tunis
- Website: csds-center.com

The Centre for Strategic and Diplomatic Studies (CSDS) is a research institute with a domestic focus on Tunisian politics, security, and economics and a regional focus on the Middle East and North Africa.

The centre was founded on 24 January 2014 in London and has a branch in Tunis. Its founder and director is Rafik Abdessalem Bouachlaka, an academic and former Foreign Minister of Tunisia.

== Aims ==
According to the Centre’s website, CSDS aims to make serious contributions in the field of economic, political, and social research, as well as in the field of national and international security and diplomacy.

The Centre aims to enhance a strategic vision for Tunisia in its immediate neighborhood and to contribute to the elaboration of general orientations in Tunisia’s foreign policy. It seeks to strengthen political, economic and cultural cooperation between the countries in the region, and strives to promote Afro-Arab integration.

CSDS carries out political analysis and risk assessment of national and cross-national security threats and closely observes sources of political violence in the region. In particular, the Centre monitors violent and armed groups, organized crime and trafficking in the MENA region.

CSDS also conducts research on migration issues, unemployment and inequality in Tunisia. In general, it encourages scientific research and seeks to raise awareness of the importance of social and scientific research, and of encouraging opportunities for youth.

== Activities ==
The Centre for Strategic and Diplomatic Studies organizes seminars, workshops conferences, specialized training courses, and publications.

The Centre publishes briefs and periodical studies, including an annual report on the situation of the Maghreb and several strategic annual reports on public opinion perceptions in Tunisia.

CSDS actively promotes opportunities for Tunisia’s international cooperation. Among the most recent activities advertised on the CSDS website is an initiative launched by the Centre in April 2015 to strengthen ties between CSDC and the Qatari Diplomatic Center for Political Studies.

== Members ==
According to the Centre’s website, the center boasts a diverse team of experts and researchers, including ministers and former officials. However, in January 2015 Abdessalem appeared to be the centre’s director, the only officially registered member and shareholder.

Abdessalem is affiliated to Ennhadha Movement, a moderate Tunisian Islamist political party with strong historical, ideological and cultural ties to the Muslim Brotherhood. Abdessalem is married to the daughter of Rached Ghannouchi, the leader of Ennhadha.

Al-Masdar News reported that after quitting his post as Minister of Foreign Affairs in Tunisia in 2013, Abdessalem returned to London where he had lived for almost twenty years and devoted his time to strategic studies, reportedly his first passion. Before engaging in political activity, Abdessalem was a researcher at Westminster University and at the Oxford Center for Islamic Studies.

He was also a senior researcher and head of al-Jazeera Center for Studies, a think tank established in 2006 by the network al-Jazeera, often accused to be supportive of Wahabism and of the Muslim Brotherhood.

== Allegations ==
The Centre was originally registered at the Westgate House 7th Floor, Westgate Road in London. On 8 June 2015 the director filed a request to relocate the business office to Marble Arch Tower, 55 Bryanston Street in London.

In February 2015, The Telegraph published an article naming the Westgate Building as “the main hub for the [Muslim] Brotherhood’s operations” in Europe. According to the article, the building hosts several organizations with ties to the Muslim Brotherhood, some of which have a controversial history with extremism and terrorist funding.
