= Nabil Ammar =

Tunisian diplomat and politician

- نبيل عمار
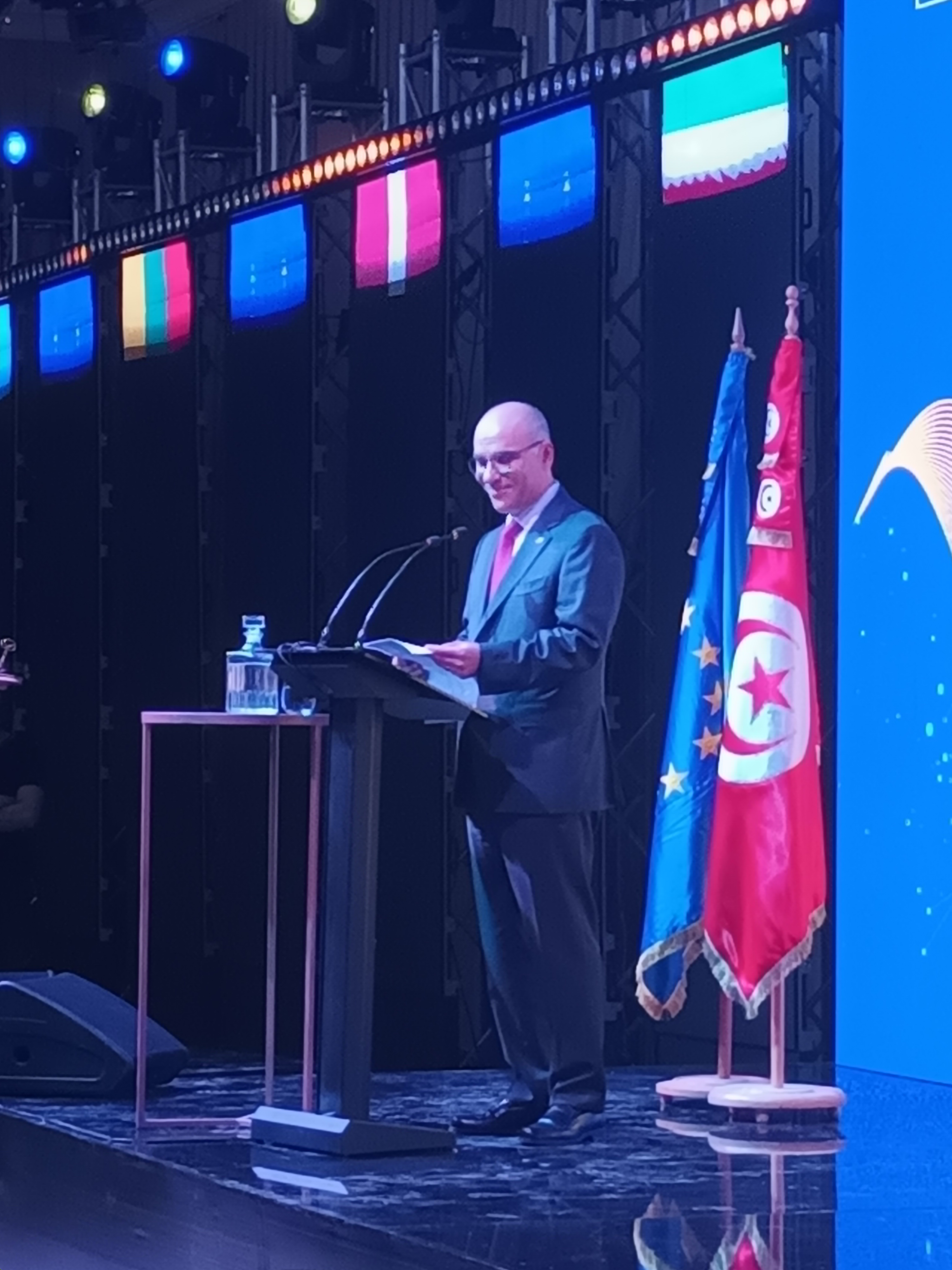
- Nabil Ammar in 2023

Minister of Foreign Affairs
- In office 2023–2025
- Preceded by: Othman Jerandi
- Succeeded by: Mohamed Ali Nafti

Personal details
- Born: 7 September 1965 (age 61) Tunis, Tunisia
- Occupation: diplomat, politician

Nabil Ammar (Arabic: نبيل عمار; born 7 September 1965) is a Tunisian diplomat and politician.

== Political career ==
He served as Minister of Foreign Affairs from 7 February 2023 until 2025.

He formerly served as Ambassador to Norway, to the European Union, Belgium and the United Kingdom.

He was appointed to the Bouden Cabinet and stayed in office in the Hachani Cabinet. In 2023, he attended the Death and state funeral of Silvio Berlusconi, coronation of Charles III and Camilla and the general debate at the United Nations General Assembly.

In March 2025, he became Tunisia's ambassador to the United Nations.
