= Khemaies Jhinaoui =

Tunisian diplomat

His Excellency Khemaies Jhinaoui
- خميّس الجهيناوي
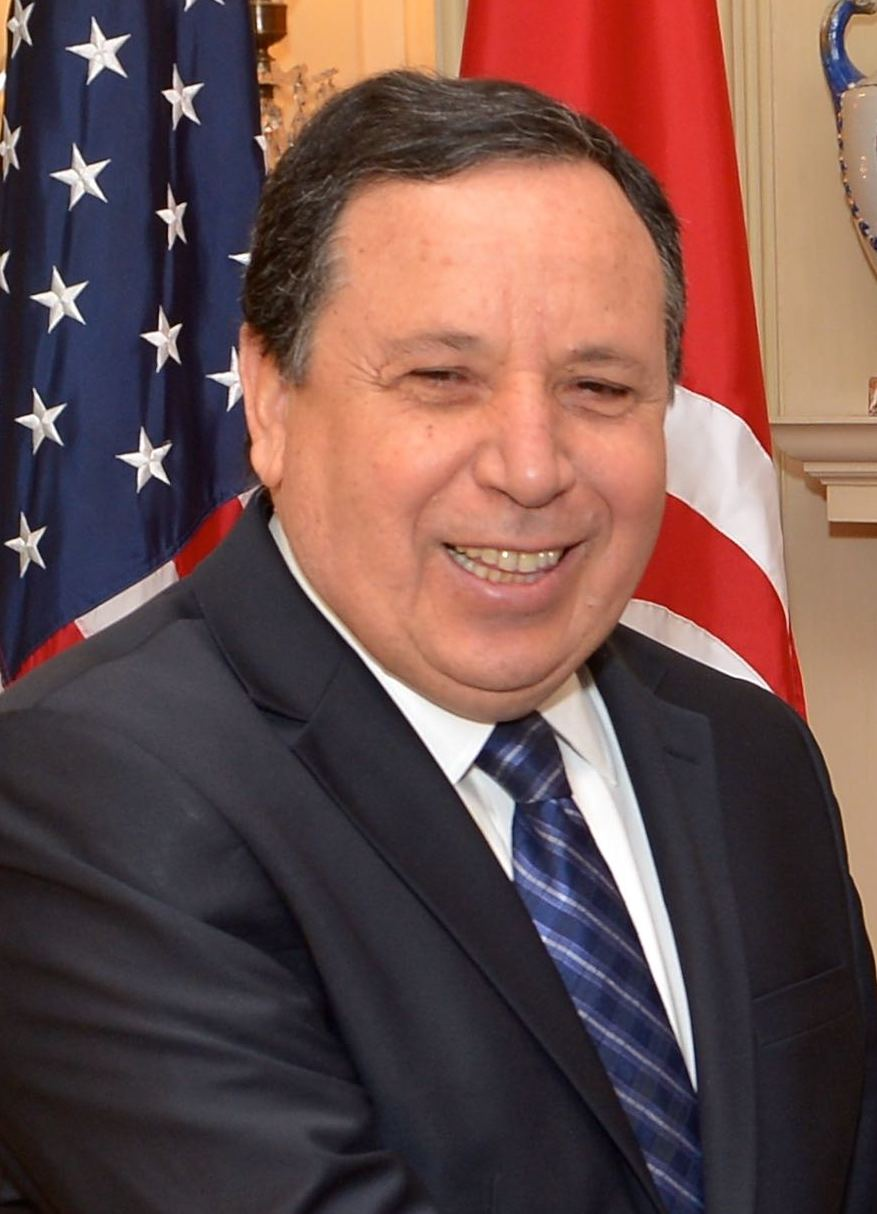

Minister of Foreign Affairs
- In office January 6, 2016 – October 29, 2019
- President: Beji Caid Essebsi
- Prime Minister: Habib Essid
- Preceded by: Taïeb Baccouche
- Succeeded by: Noureddine Erray

Personal details
- Born: Khemaies Jhinaoui; April 5, 1954 (age 72) Kairouan, Tunisia
- Children: 2
- Relatives: Sihem Kéfi
- Education: Degree in Public Law; Advanced Degree in Political Science and International Relations
- Occupation: Diplomat, Ambassador, Minister
- Awards: 2011 : Commander of the Order of the Republic of Tunisia; 2019 : Grand Officier of the Order of the Republic of Tunisia; 2019 : Honorary member of the Xirka Ġieħ ir-Repubblika of Malta

Khemaies Jhinaoui (born April 5, 1954) is a Tunisian lawyer, diplomat and politician who served as Secretary of State to the Minister of Foreign Affairs in 2011, and Minister of Foreign Affairs of Tunisia from 2016 to 2019. Jhinaoui previously served as Ambassador to Russia and Ukraine from December 2001 to June 2011.

== Biography ==
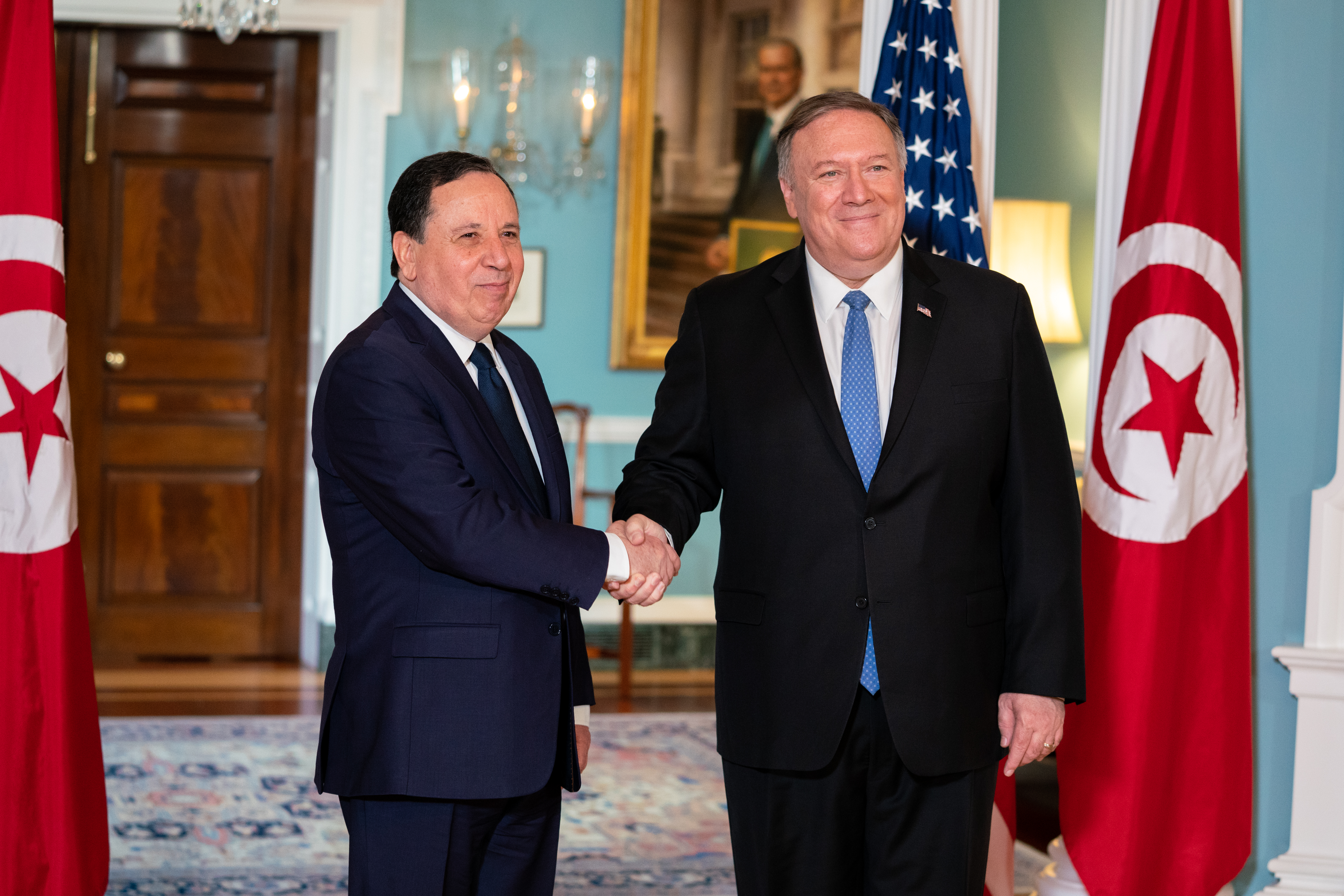
Jhinaoui meets with U.S. Secretary of State Michael R. Pompeo at the U.S. Department of State in Washington, D.C., on July 16, 2019.

=== Diplomatic career ===
Khemaies Jhinaoui obtained a degree in public law, a postgraduate degree in public law and a certificate of advanced studies in political science and international relations. In 1978, he obtained a certificate of competence in the legal profession.

In 1979, Jhinaoui began working at the Ministry of Foreign Affairs, where he held numerous positions in the diplomatic corps.

In May 1996, he was sent to Israel to open his country's interest office in Tel Aviv.

In January 2006, he was appointed director of political and economic affairs and cooperation with Europe and the European Union in the foreign affairs ministry.

Between 2008 and 2011, he was Ambassador of Tunisia to Russia, being also accredited as non-resident of all the member countries of the CIS, including Ukraine and Georgia, despite Georgia leaving CIS in 2009.

=== Political career ===
After the Tunisian revolution of 2011, Khemaies Jhinaoui was appointed Secretary of State to the Minister of Foreign Affairs in the government of Béji Caïd Essebsi; his referent minister is Mouldi Kefi. Radhouane Nouisser has held the same position since January 17, and left his position at the same time as Jhinaoui, on December 24 of the same year.

Diplomatic advisor to the President of the Republic, he was appointed Minister of Foreign Affairs in the government of Habib Essid on January 6, 2016; he is confirmed to this position in the government of Youssef Chahed. He remained in this position until October 29, 2019, the date of his dismissal, although he had submitted his resignation.

== Honours ==
- 2015: Commander of the Legion of Honour (France)
- 2015: Commander of the Order of the Polar Star (Sweden)
- 2017: Knight Grand Cross of the Order of Merit of the Italian Republic (Italy)
- 2019: Honorary member of the Xirka Ġieħ ir-Repubblika (Malta)
- 2019: Grand Officier of the Order of the Republic (Tunisia, Commander in 2011)

== See also ==
- List of foreign ministers in 2017
- List of current foreign ministers
