= Taïeb Baccouche =

Tunisian politician and trade unionist

- الطيب البكوش
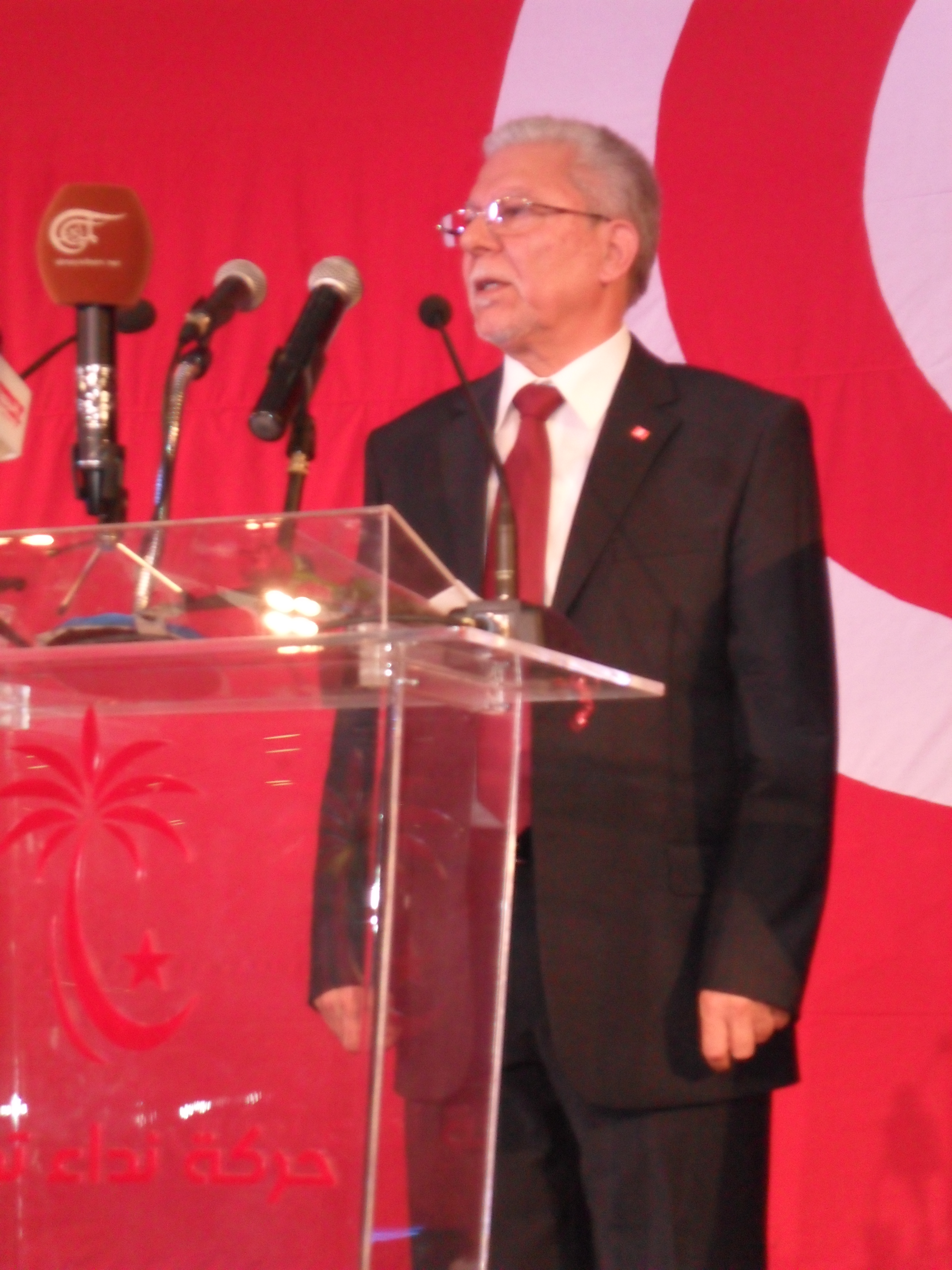

Minister of Foreign Affairs
- In office 5 February 2015 – 6 January 2016
- President: Beji Caid Essebsi
- Prime Minister: Habib Essid
- Preceded by: Mongi Hamdi
- Succeeded by: Khemaies Jhinaoui

Minister of Education
- In office 17 January 2011 – 24 December 2011
- President: Foued Mebazaa (Acting)
- Prime Minister: Mohamed Ghannouchi; Béji Caïd Essebsi
- Preceded by: Hatem Ben Salem
- Succeeded by: Samir Dilou

Secretary General of UGTT
- In office 19 February 1981 – 17 December 1984
- Preceded by: Habib Achour
- Succeeded by: Habib Achour

Personal details
- Born: Taïeb Baccouche; 1 November 1944 (age 81) Jemmal, Tunisia
- Education: Licence in Arabic; Degree in Old History and Archeology; Degree in French Literature and Language; PhD in Linguistics degree of Linguistics aggregation in Arabic; Baccalaureate
- Occupation: Linguist, Professor, Syndicalist, Human Rights
- Notable work: Tunisian Linguistics' Atlas

Taïeb Baccouche (Arabic: الطيب البكوش; born 1 November 1944) is a Tunisian politician who has been Secretary-General of the Arab Maghreb Union since 2016. Previously he served in the government of Tunisia as Minister of Education in 2011, in the wake of the Tunisian Revolution, and Minister of Foreign Affairs from 2015 to 2016.

== Life and career ==
Born at Jemmal in 1944, Baccouche travelled to France in 1965 to study at the Sorbonne where he obtained a degree in Linguistics in 1966 and an aggregation in Arabic in 1968. After that, he returned to Tunis to teach at the University of Tunis. Baccouche was awarded a State Doctorate in Linguistics in 1980 from the University of Paris Sorbonne. He was General Secretary of the Tunisian General Labour Union (UGTT) from 1981 to 1984. He was President of the Tunisian Association of Linguistics from 1995 to 2002 and has been General Secretary of the Mediterranean Linguistics Meetings –RLM and President of the Human Rights Arab Institute since 1998.

After the Tunisian Revolution, he served in the government as Minister of Education from January 2011 to December 2011. Later, he was appointed as Minister of Foreign Affairs in January 2015. After less than a year in that post, Khemaies Jhinaoui was appointed to succeed him in January 2016. Baccouche was then appointed as Secretary-General of the Arab Maghreb Union on 5 May 2016.

== Honours ==
- Commandeur of the Order of the Republic of Tunisia (23 November 2011)
