= Abdelwahab Abdallah =

Tunisian politician and diplomat

Abdelwahab Abdallah عبد الوهاب عبد الله
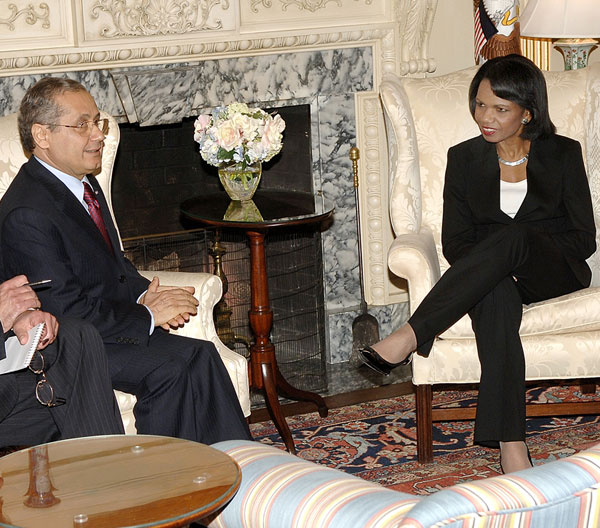
- Abdelwahab Abdallah with Condoleezza Rice

Minister of Foreign Affairs of Tunisia
- In office 17 August 2005 – 14 January 2010
- President: Zine El Abidine Ben Ali
- Preceded by: Abdelbaki Hermassi
- Succeeded by: Kamel Morjane

Minister of Information of Tunisia
- In office 1987–1988
- President: Habib Bourguiba

Personal details
- Born: 14 February 1940 (age 86) Monastir, Tunisia
- Spouse: Alya Abdallah

Abdelwahab Abdallah (Arabic: عبد الوهاب عبد الله; born 14 February 1940) is a Tunisian politician and diplomat who served as the Minister of Foreign Affairs of Tunisia and was advisor to the President.

== Early life ==
Abdallah was born in Monastir, Tunisia on 14 February 1940.

== Career ==
Before Zine El Abidine Ben Ali was elected the president in 1987, Abdallah was the Minister of Information of Tunisia under Habib Bourguiba. Abdallah was in office until 1988. From 1988 to 1990 he served as the Ambassador of Tunisia to Great Britain. As a member of Constitutional Democratic Rally, he was a close aid to the president of Tunisia since 1990 on economic issues. and led several Tunisian press agencies. He became foreign minister in a cabinet reshuffle on 17 August 2005. His successor, Kamel Morjane was appointed Foreign Minister of Tunisia by President Ben Ali on 14 January 2010.

Following Tunisian protests in 2010-2011, he was removed from his post on 13 January 2011. Abdallah was subsequently put under house arrest on 24 January 2011 while the investigations are ongoing.

== Personal life ==
Abdallah's wife, Alya Abdallah, was appointed president of Banque de Tunisie (BT) in April 2008.
