= Mahmoud Mestiri =

Tunisian diplomat and politician (1929–2006)

Mahmoud Mestiri (25 December 1929 in Tunis – 28 June 2006) was a Tunisian diplomat and politician, who served as the minister of foreign affairs from 1987 to 1988. He was serving as the ambassador of Tunisia when he was appointed to the post when President Habib Bourguiba was deposed by Zine El Abidine Ben Ali and a new cabinet was formed. In both posts he replaced Hédi Mabrouk. Mestiri was former president of the Tunisian football team Club Africain.
