= Noureddine Erray =

Tunisian politician (born 1970)

- نور الدين الري
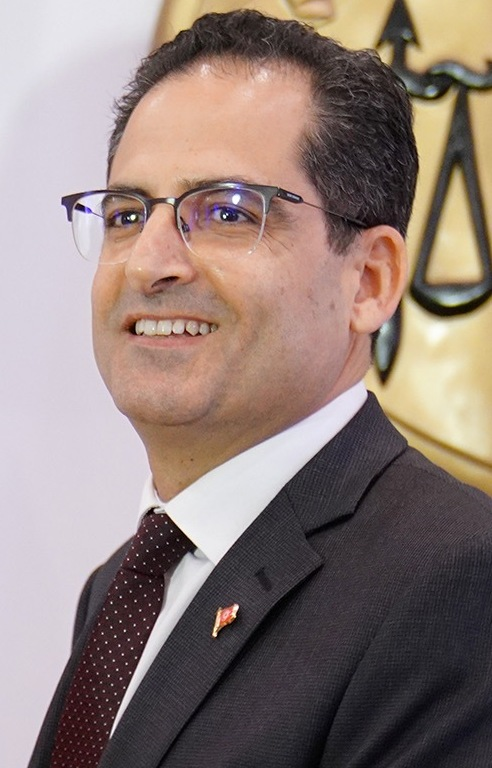

Minister of Foreign Affairs
- In office 27 February 2020 – 24 July 2020
- Preceded by: Khemaies Jhinaoui
- Succeeded by: Othman Jerandi

Personal details
- Born: 1970 (age 55–56)

Noureddine Erray (Arabic: نور الدين الري; born 1970) is a Tunisian diplomat.

== Biography ==
He joined the Ministry of Foreign Affairs in 1996. In 2003, he was appointed Counselor at the Tunisian Embassy in Serbia.

In 2010, he was posted to Rabat, before being appointed Ambassador Extraordinary and Plenipotentiary of Tunisia to Kuwait in 2013. From 2018 to 2020, he held the post of Ambassador in Oman.

He served as Minister of Foreign Affairs from 27 February 2020 to 24 July 2020.
