= Isabel Saint Malo =

Panamanian politician

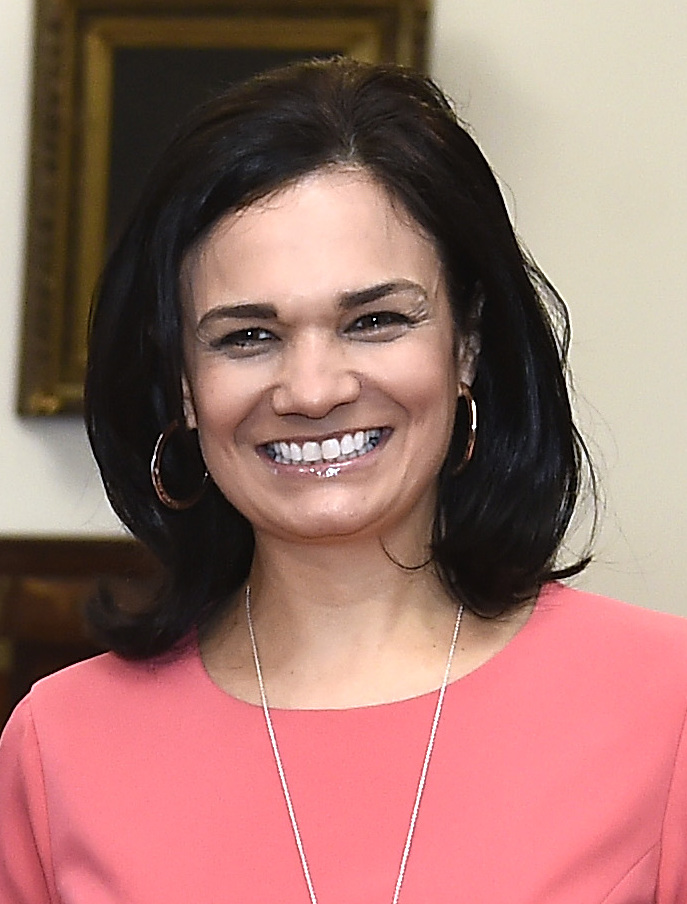
- Saint Malo in 2016

Vice President of Panama
- In office 1 July 2014 – 1 July 2019
- President: Juan Carlos Varela
- Preceded by: Juan Carlos Varela
- Succeeded by: José Gabriel Carrizo

Minister of Foreign Affairs of Panama
- In office 1 July 2014 – 1 July 2019
- President: Juan Carlos Varela
- Preceded by: Francisco Álvarez de Soto
- Succeeded by: Alejandro Ferrer López

Personal details
- Born: Isabel Cecilia de Saint Malo García; 27 June 1968 (age 58) Panama City, Panama
- Party: Independent
- Spouse: Omar A. Alvarado D. (m. 1993)
- Children: 3
- Education: Saint Joseph's University (BA); Nova Southeastern University (MBA)
- Occupation: Politician; diplomat

Isabel de Saint Malo García de Alvarado (born 27 June 1968) is a Panamanian politician and diplomat. She formerly was Vice President of Panama and Minister of Foreign Affairs from 1 July 2014, to 30 June 2019. De Saint Malo ran with elected President Juan Carlos Varela, on the ticket made up of an alliance of the Panameñista Party and the People's Party. She is the first woman in Panama's history elected for this post and the first woman to be appointed Minister of Foreign Affairs in Panama.

Saint Malo has experience on the global agenda and has encouraged improving human development, gender equality, eradicating poverty, and addressing social inequality. She has experience in consulting and development of public policies in Latin America. She has engaged with academic institutions globally, conversing with students and faculty. She has served on a number of private sector and non-profit boards.

== Early life and education ==
Saint Malo was born in 1968 in Panama City, Panama. She is the eldest daughter of Raul de Saint Malo Arias and Florencia de Saint Malo and has two siblings. She spent the entirety of her elementary and middle school in El Colegio de Las Esclavas del Sagrado Corazon de Jesus before going to Philadelphia's Saint Joseph's Academy to finish high school. Saint Malo went on to graduate from Saint Joseph's University in 1989, with a Bachelor of Arts degree in International Relations. She also graduated with a Master in Business Administration from Nova Southeastern University, in 1995.

== Career ==
=== United Nations ===
Isabel Saint Malo was the Assistant Resident Representative - Program Manager, a position from where she oversaw a portfolio of more than 60 projects, a total five-year budget of $600 million, and an annual delivery of approximately $100 million. She supervised a team of 25 professionals directly and over 50 executing units; and handled strategic planning, budget, cash flow, quality assurance, and negotiations with government officials, donors, and third parties.

From UNDP, one of Saint Malo's most notable works was when she led the team that designed and led the construction of the Agreements Panama 2000. This agreements served to create the legal and constitutional framework of the Panama Canal Authority (ACP). This was a crucial action taken in order to maintain the Panama Canal working properly for the benefit of the country and the international community once the administration of the Canal returned to Panamanian hands after the United States' administration.

=== Political career ===
An outsider to politics and the top echelons of government, Saint Malo––an independent––was invited by then candidate Juan Carlos Varela, to run as vice president, under the Panameñista and Popular Party tickets. After much consideration, she decided to accept the invitation due to her conviction on the importance of "not just believing in something, but fighting for what she believed in,"––a phrase that she used during her nomination-acceptance speech. Saint Malo served as a fresh face and a conciliatory figure to an electorate that was tired of the political class, hence gaining voters as they saw an accomplished woman who had never been in government engage in the political arena. Eventually, Varela and Saint Malo won the 2014 elections and were installed into Office inviting civil society leaders and independents to join the Cabinet.

=== Vice Presidency and Ministry of Foreign Affairs ===
After winning election, Saint Malo was named Minister of Foreign Affairs and chair of the Social Cabinet, composed of seven ministries responsible for the coordination of health, education, environment, employment, and other social policies and programs focusing on advancing the Sustainable Development Goals (SDG's). She drove social policies centered on eradicating poverty and social inequality, including promoting the first National Poverty Multidimensional Index and the design of the first Child and Infant Multidimensional Poverty Index, in collaboration with Oxford University, the United Nations Development Program (UNDP), and UNICEF.

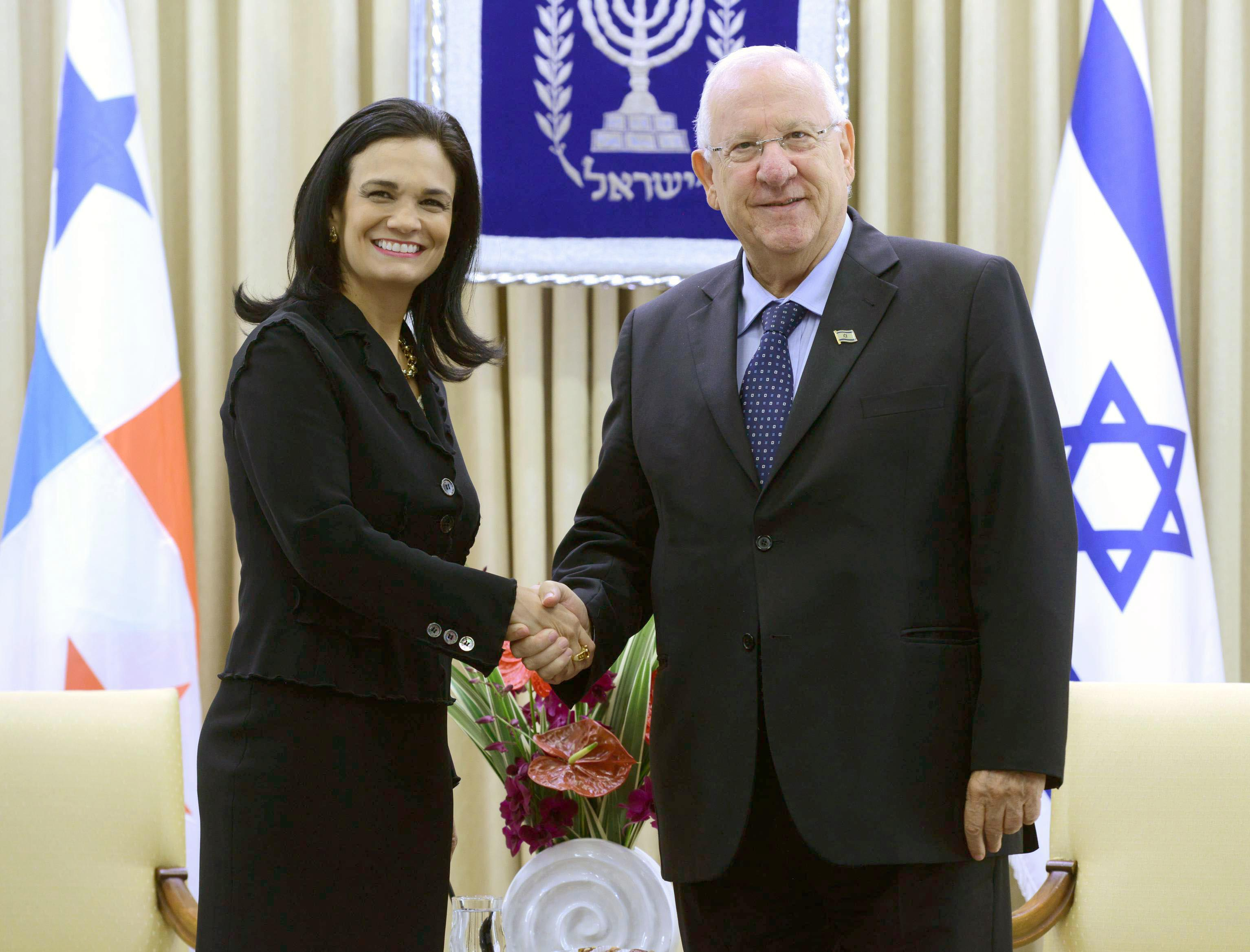
Saint Maio meets with President of Israel Reuven Rivlin in 2015

As Minister of Foreign Affairs, she successfully implemented the modernization and institutional strengthening of the Ministry, with the objective of encouraging professionalism in Panamanian diplomacy. Saint Malo also led Panama's agenda as a leader for humanitarian response initiatives, including the inauguration of the First Humanitarian Hub for Latin America and the Caribbean, partnering with the Red Cross, the Red Crescent, and the United Nations Office for the Coordination of Humanitarian Affairs (OCHA).

Saint Malo promoted anti-corruption and transparency efforts at the national level, including legislation reform and ethics training and oversight. She also championed several gender equality initiatives: the Equal Pay Coalition led by the International Labor Organization, UN Women, and the Organization for Economic Co-operation and Development (OECD); the Gender Parity Initiative; and legislation to ensure 30% female participation at boards of directors.

In June 2017, Ms. Saint Malo was responsible for breaking diplomatic relations with Taiwan, formally the Republic of China, and establishing diplomatic ties with the People's Republic of China. Such a transition was a long-awaited step in Panamanian diplomacy due to China's role and importance in the global economy.

=== Post-Politics Career ===
Upon the end of her mandate as vice president, Saint Malo was invited and selected by Harvard University for a fellowship at the Institute of Politics of the Kennedy School of Government for the 2019 Fall Semester. At Harvard, she led a study group on foreign affairs, immersing on issues of the Global Development Agenda, including sustainable development goals, peace and foreign policy with a concentration on Latin America. She also served as a mentor for students and engaged with faculty members on these issues.

== Personal life ==
In 1993, she married Omar A. Alvarado D., a Panamanian banker and investor, and has since been married to him. They reside in Panama City, Panama and have three children: Alberto, Carolina Isabel, and Julio Raul Alvarado de Saint Malo.

== Awards and recognitions ==
For her contributions in building national consensus over two decades, Isabel Saint Malo received the Woman of the Year award in 2012, given by the Panamanian Business Executives Association, APEDE. She was also the first Latin American to be distinguished by the Harry S. Truman Institute for the Advancement of Peace of the Hebrew University of Israel, for the role played by the Government of the Republic of Panama preparing the stage for the historic meeting between the presidents of Cuba and the United States, during the VII Summit of the Americas in April 2015. She was honored by the Council of the Americas with the Bravo Award for Innovative Leader of the Year in 2018. Ranked by Forbes Magazine among Latin America's most powerful women.

The former vice president has been a member of different boards of directors including Banco BBVA and Fundación Democracia y Libertad. She was a founding member of Women Corporate Directors Association of Panama; the Global Shapers hub of Panama City––an initiative of the World Economic Forum to develop the potential of young leaders; and was appointed as an expert to the Global Agenda Council on Transparency (2014).

Ms. Saint Malo is a fellow of the Central American Leadership Initiative (CALI) and the Aspen Institute. She is also a member of Global Women Leader Voices for Change and Inclusion, of the advisory board of Women Political Leaders, of the editorial board of Americas Quarterly.

== See also ==
- List of foreign ministers in 2017
- List of current foreign ministers

Political offices
Preceded by Fernando Núñez Fábrega	Minister of Foreign Relations; 2014–2019	Succeeded by Alejandro Ferrer López
Preceded by Juan Carlos Varela	Vice President of Panama; 2014–2019	Succeeded by José Gabriel Carrizo
