= Mohamed Ali Nafti =

Tunisian diplomat and politician (born 1959)

Minister of Foreign Affairs
- Incumbent
- Assumed office 25 August 2024
- Preceded by: Nabil Ammar

Personal details
- Born: 19 May 1959 (age 67) Bizerte, Tunisia
- Occupation: diplomat, politician

Mohamed Ali Nafti (Arabic: محمد على النفطي, DMG; Muḥammad ʿAlī an-Nafṭī; born 19 May 1959 in Bizerte) is a Tunisian diplomat and politician. He has been the Foreign Minister of Tunisia since 25 August 2024.

== Biography ==
Nafti obtained a Master's degree in Languages with a specialization in Economics and International Organizations from the Bourguiba Institute of Living Languages in 1982. In the same year, he joined the Tunisian Ministry of Foreign Affairs. He served at the Tunisian Embassy in Riyadh from 1988 to 1993 and at the Embassy in Athens from 1996 to 2002. From 2005 to 2010, he was Minister plénipotentiaire at the Embassy in Madrid, from 2010 to 2011 Attaché in the Diplomatic Section of the Office of the President of Tunisia, and from 2011 to 2012 Director of Communications at the Ministry of Foreign Affairs. From 2012 to 2017, he served as Ambassador to Seoul. Upon his return, he was appointed Director General for Consular Affairs.

In September 2020, he was appointed Undersecretary of State in the Ministry of Foreign Affairs in the government of Hichem Mechichi. He was dismissed from this post on 30 July 2021. In October 2023, he was appointed Minister plénipotentiaire and Director General of the Ministry of Foreign Affairs' central governance unit.

As part of a major cabinet reshuffle, he was appointed by President Kais Saied on 25 August 2024 as Minister of Foreign Affairs, Migration and Tunisians Abroad, succeeding Nabil Ammar.

Nafti is married and the father of two daughters.
