= Saïd Ben Mustapha =

Tunisian politician (1938–2024)

Saïd Ben Mustapha (Arabic: سعيد بن مصطفى; 28 July 1938 – 12 November 2024) was a Tunisian politician and diplomat. He was Tunisia's minister of foreign affairs from 1997 to 1999.

== Early life and career ==
Ben Mustapha was born in Tunis on 28 July 1938. He studied economics and graduated in 1961 from the Graduate Institute of International Studies in Geneva. Ben Mustapha entered in 1962 the Ministry of Foreign Affairs. He became a charge d'affaires in Tripoli in 1970, later in 1975 as a cabinet attaché to the Minister of Foreign Affairs. He was made consul general of Tunisia in Lyon then in Palermo in 1979. He was later, in 1982, appointed ambassador to Lebanon, when the country was in the midst of civil war. Ben Mustapha was made ambassador in Amman in 1985, and became High Representative of Tunisia in Tripoli in 1988, then secretary of state to the minister of foreign affairs in charge of Maghreb Affairs in 1991, ambassador to Rome in 1997 and ambassador to the United Nations.

== Personal life and death ==
Ben Mustapha was married and had three children. He died on 12 November 2024, at the age of 86.
