= Abdelbaki Hermassi =

Tunisian politician (1937–2021)

Abdelbaki Hermassi عبد الباقي الهرماسي

Minister of Foreign Affairs of Tunisia
- In office 10 November 2004 – 17 August 2005
- President: Zine El Abidine Ben Ali
- Preceded by: Habib Ben Yahia
- Succeeded by: Abdelwahab Abdallah

Minister of Culture of Tunisia
- In office N/A–N/A

Personal details
- Born: 26 December 1937 Fériana, Tunisia
- Died: 23 October 2021 (aged 83)

Abdelbaki Hermassi (Arabic: عبد الباقي الهرماسي; 26 December 1937 – 23 October 2021) was a Tunisian politician. He was the Minister of Foreign Affairs of Tunisia from 10 November 2004 when he was appointed during a cabinet reshuffle, until another cabinet reshuffle on 17 August 2005 when he lost that position. He was previously the minister of culture of Tunisia. On 13 May 2008, he was named President of the Higher Communication Council.
