= Janaina Tewaney =

Panamanian politician (born 1984)

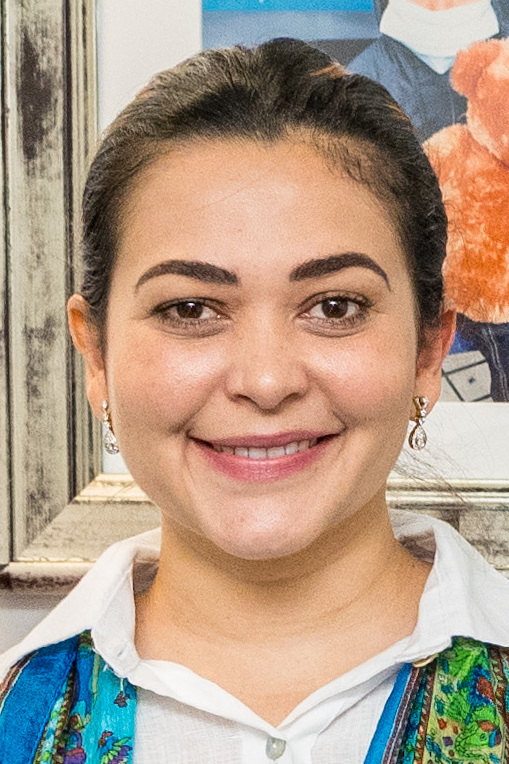
Janaina Tewaney Mencomo in 2023

Janaina Tewaney Mencomo (born 14 July 1984) is a Panamanian politician. She served as foreign minister of Panama from October 2022 to July 2024. She also previously served as Minister of Government of Panama from March 2020 through October 2022.

Studied at Colegio San Agustín high school in the Republic of Panama. In 2006, she graduated from the Law and Political Science School of the University of Panama, following presentation of the thesis “India-Pakistan Armed Conflict in the Light of International Law”, earning the highest score and recommendation for publication by the Evaluation Council.

Obtained an Advanced Master’s Degree in International Law at the Université libre de Bruxelles, in Brussels, Belgium, upon presentation of the degree paper titled “Is the Indo-U.S. Nuclear Cooperation Deal Compatible with the Treaty on Non-Proliferation of Nuclear Weapons?”

Earned a Master of Laws degree in Arbitration, Mediation, and Dispute Resolution at the University of Hong Kong, where she presented the research paper “Is mediation the best way to create understanding among nations?”

She served at the Ministry of Commerce and Industries as one of the attorneys in charge of negotiating the Free Trade Agreements between Panama and its commercial partners.

Worked as Senior Assistant for Academic Research on Nuclear and Chemical Disarmament and its Correlation with International Law and Alternative Conflict Resolution for the University of Hong Kong Law School. At Strategic Foresight Group in Mumbai, India, she was an International Policy Analyst on terrorist financing, geopolitical scenario creation in security issues, and water diplomacy.

She collaborated with Oxford University in the preparation of the report titled “Humanity at Risk - Global Terrorism Threat Indicant”, an exhaustive analysis of the most relevant terrorist groups worldwide, their capabilities, adherents, ideologies and financial resources. In Water Diplomacy / Hydro Diplomacy, she was responsible for the development and analysis of future scenarios in terms of peace and security regarding rivers, lakes, and international aquifers in Latin America, Africa and the Middle East.

In the Administration of President Laurentino Cortizo Cohen, she held the position of Advisor to Foreign Minister Alejandro Ferrer on issues related to international security, terrorism, and official missions of the President of the Republic. In March 2020, she was appointed Minister of Government (Minister of the Interior), a position in which she performed outstandingly and where she launched the Economic Empowerment Plan for Indigenous Women, with the collaboration of the Inter-American Development Bank.
