= Hédi Mabrouk =

Tunisian diplomat and politician (1921–2011)

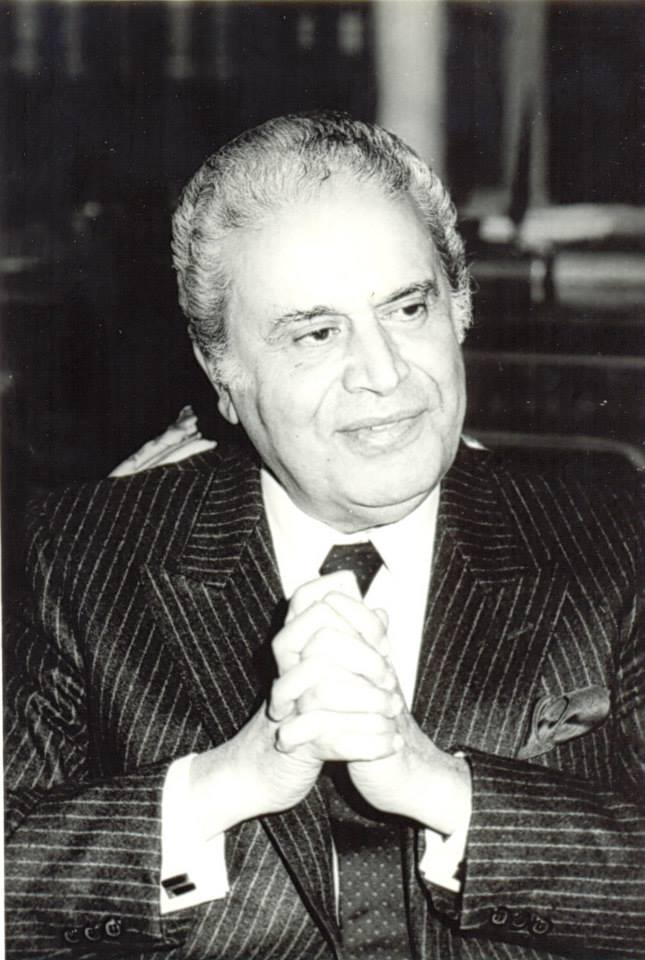

Minister of Foreign Affairs
- In office September 1986 – December 1987
- President: Habib Bourguiba
- Prime Minister: Rachid Sfar
- Preceded by: Beji Caid Essebsi
- Succeeded by: Mahmoud Mestiri

Ambassador of Tunisia to France
- In office 1 December 1973 – September 1986
- Succeeded by: Mahmoud Mestiri

Personal details
- Born: 7 April 1921 Tunis, Tunisia
- Died: 15 June 2000 (aged 79)
- Education: University of Algiers

Hédi Mabrouk (7 April 1921 – 15 June 2000) was a Tunisian statesman, diplomat and politician. After serving as governor of different provinces between 1956 and 1962 he headed various state-owned companies. He was the ambassador of Tunisia to France from 1973 to 1985 and the minister of foreign affairs for one year in 1986-1987. He was the last foreign minister of the Habib Bourguiba era and also, was also one of his allies.

== Early years and education ==
Mabrouk was born in Tunis on 7 April 1921. His family were from Monastir, Tunisia. He was a graduate of the University of Algiers, Algeria.

== Career ==
Mabrouk started his career in 1939. He was the governor of Sbeitla from 1956 to 1958. He was appointed governor of Gafsa in 1958, and held the position until 1960 when he was named as the governor of Kef. His tenure ended in 1962. Then he began to head some state-owned companies. He was the president of the Tunisian State Shipping Company between 1962 and 1966. He served as the director general and president of the International Harvester company based in Tunis in 1966. The following year he was named as the general commissioner of textiles and the president of the National Federation of Exporters. In 1973 he was made the director of the central administration at the Ministry of National Economy. On 1 December 1973 he was named as the ambassador of Tunisia to France and was in office until 1985. His successor was Mahmoud Mestiri.

In September 1986 Mabrouk was appointed minister of foreign affairs, replacing Beji Caid Essebsi, who had been removed by President Habib Bourguiba. Mabrouk served in the post under Prime Minister Rachid Sfar. Mabrouk's term ended in November 1987 when President Bourguiba was deposed by Zine El Abidine Ben Ali and a new cabinet was formed. Mabrouk learned about Bourguiba being deposed in Amman, Jordan, while attending an Arab summit meeting and was replaced by Mahmoud Mestiri as foreign minister.

=== Alliances ===
Mabrouk was one of the three individuals belonging to the inner circle of Habib Bourguiba. The others were Bourguiba's niece Sassi and Mansour Skhiri. Mabrouk had a very good command of French and was the writer of the articles signed by Bourguiba which were published in various media outlets.

== Later years and death ==
Mabrouk retired from politics after his dismissal from office in 1987. He died on 15 June 2000.

In 2012 his memoirs were published by the Sud Press under the title Feuilles d’Automne (French: Autumn Leaves).
