= Kamel Morjane =

Tunisian politician and diplomat

Kamel Morjane كمال مرجان
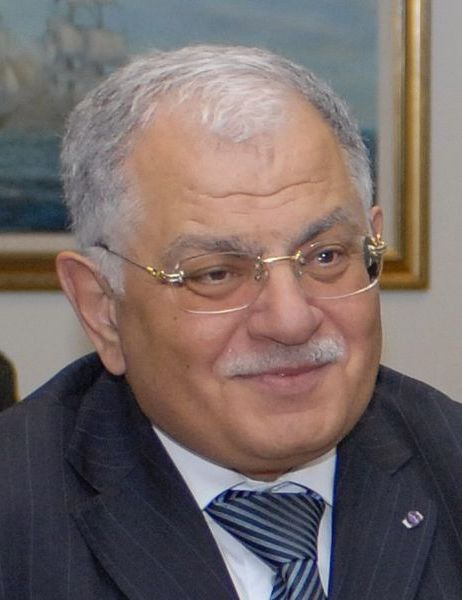
- Morjane at the Pentagon in 2008

Minister of the Public Service
- Incumbent
- Assumed office 12 November 2018
- President: Beji Caid Essebsi
- Prime Minister: Youssef Chahed

Minister of Foreign Affairs
- In office 14 January 2010 – 27 January 2011
- President: Zine El Abidine Ben Ali
- Prime Minister: Mohamed Ghannouchi
- Preceded by: Abdelwahab Abdallah
- Succeeded by: Ahmed Ounaies

Minister of Defense
- In office 17 August 2005 – 14 January 2010
- President: Zine El Abidine Ben Ali
- Prime Minister: Mohamed Ghannouchi
- Preceded by: Hédi M'henni
- Succeeded by: Ridha Grira

Personal details
- Born: May 9, 1948 (age 78) Hammam Sousse, Tunisia
- Party: Long Live Tunisia (since 2019); The Initiative (2011–2019); RCD (1988–2011); PSD (1964–1988); Neo Destour (before 1964)

Kamel Morjane, also spelled Kemal Mourjan, (Arabic: كمال مرجان; born 9 May 1948) is a Tunisian politician and diplomat who served as the Minister of Defense from 2005 to 2010 and as Minister of Foreign Affairs from 2010 to 2011. After the Tunisian Revolution, he was designated as the Minister of the Public Service.

== Life and political career ==
Morjane was born in Hammam Sousse, Tunisia on 9 May 1948. After getting his Bachelor of Law degree and his diploma of Public Administration (ENA) from the University of Tunis, he studied International law and graduated from the Graduate Institute of International Studies in Geneva. He obtained a diploma in Emergency management from the University of Wisconsin and a research certificate from The Hague Academy of International Law.

He worked at the United Nations High Commissioner for Refugees (UNHCR) from 1977 to 1996, and served particularly as Director of Personnel (1988–89), Director for South West Asia North Africa and the Middle East (1990–94), then as Director for Africa (1994–96). He was appointed in October 1996 as Permanent Representative of Tunisia to the United Nations and International Organisations in Geneva. In November 1999 he was selected by the UN Secretary General as his Special Representative for the Congo (DRC); his main task was to build up the UN Peacekeeping Mission (MONUC). He had to leave the DRC in September 2001 for family reasons and was offered the post of Assistant High Commissioner for Refugees. Between 17 August 2005 and 14 January 2010 he served as Defense Minister of Tunisia. On 14 January 2010, he was appointed Minister of Foreign Affairs. After the ouster of Tunisian President Zine El Abidine Ben Ali in January 2011, Morjane was confirmed in the coalition government from which he resigned on 27 January 2011. He created a new political party, "Al Moubadara" (The Initiative), on 1 April 2011.

He is an Eminent Member of the Sérgio Vieira de Mello Foundation and member, since 2014, of the United Nations Advisory Board on Human Security.

On 5 November 2018, he was appointed the Minister of the Public Service. On 13 November, his appointment was approved by the Assembly of the Representatives of the People. On 23 November, he was appointed a member of the directive board of the African Union's Peace Fund.

On 22 August 2019, he was appointed acting head of the Tunisian government after receiving the prerogatives of Youssef Chahed, implicated in the 2019 presidential election.

== Honours ==
- Grand officer of the Order of the Republic of Tunisia
- Grand cordon of the Order of 7-November
