= Rafik Abdessalem =

Tunisian politician

- رفيق عبد السلام
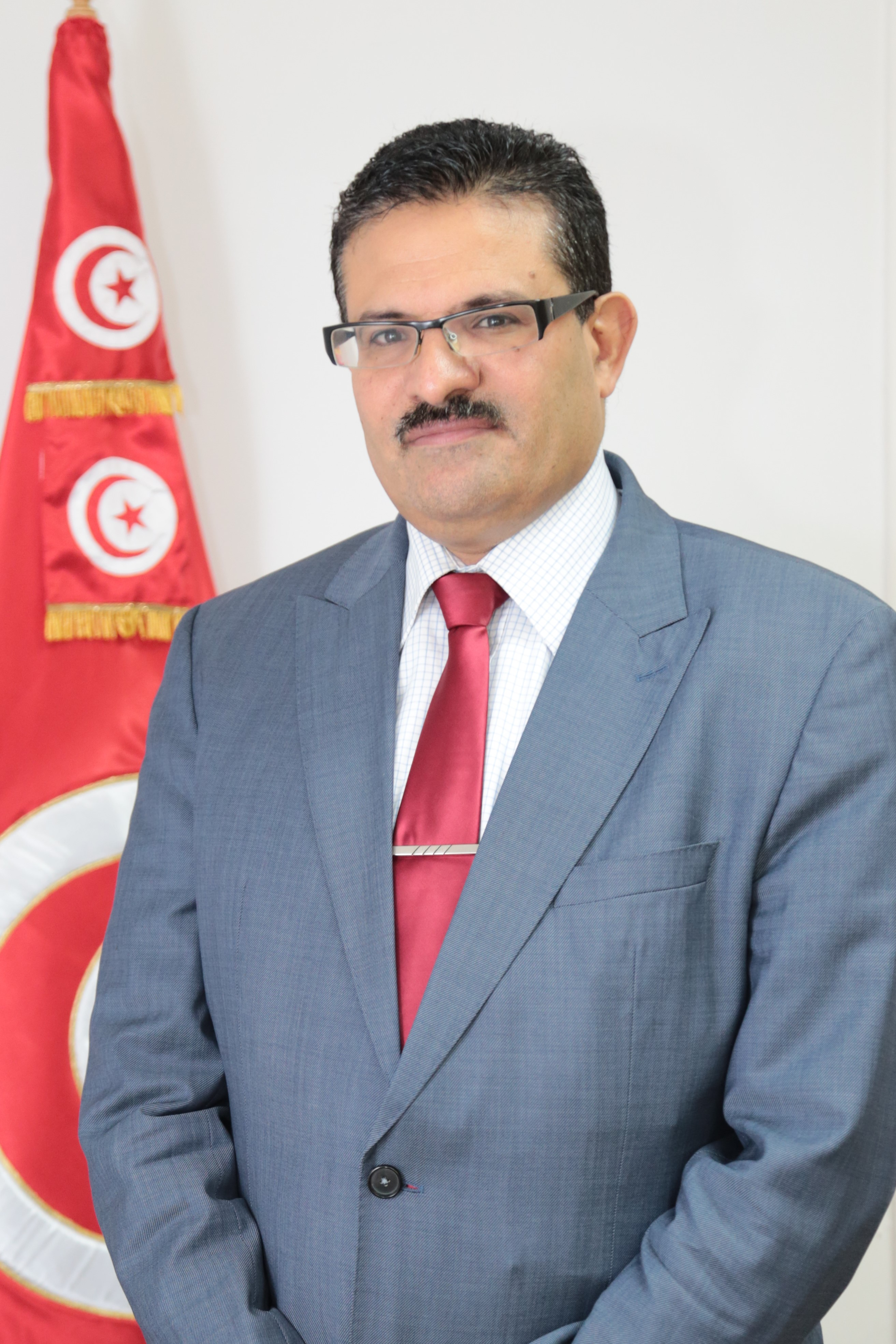

Minister of Foreign Affairs
- In office 20 December 2011 – 14 March 2013
- Prime Minister: Hamadi Jebali
- Preceded by: Mouldi Kefi
- Succeeded by: Othman Jerandi

Personal details
- Born: Rafik Abdessalem Bouchlaka; 1967 (age 58–59)
- Education: Mohammed V University

Rafik Abdessalem Bouchlaka is a Tunisian politician. He served as the minister of foreign affairs under Prime Minister Hamadi Jebali.

== Education ==
Abdessalem received a bachelor's degree in philosophy from Mohammed V University and earned a PhD in politics and international relations from the University of Westminster in 2003.

== Career ==
From 1987 to 1990, Bouchlaka was a member of the executive office of the Union Générale des Etudiants de Tunisie (UGET). In London, he founded the Maghreb Center for Research and Translation, and chaired the London Platform for Dialogue. He was also a visiting scholar at the Oxford Centre for Islamic Studies. He worked as senior researcher and head of the Research and Studies Office at the Al Jazeera Center for Studies. He is a member of the Centre Union Process. He has published two books and many articles in Asharq Al-Awsat.

He is a member of the Ennahda Movement, and the party leader Rached Ghannouchi's son-in-law. On 20 December 2011, after former President Zine El Abidine Ben Ali was deposed, he joined the Jebali Cabinet as minister of foreign affairs from 2011 to 2013 serving the first democratic government of Tunisia. Similar to Rached Ghannouchi, he was forced into exile during the Ben Ali regime where he became one of the leaders of the party's exiled bureau. Abdessalem was only able to return to his homeland after 21 years following the Tunisian revolution.

He is an Executive Bureau member of the Ennahdha Party, in charge of External Relations and a member of its Political Bureau, and has also been serving since 2007 in its Consultative Council, the higher decisional instance of the party.

He is the founder and Director of the Centre for Strategic and Diplomatic Studies (CSDS) established in 2014.

In April 2016, the case against Rafik Abdessalem concerning the Sheraton affair and the Chinese donation scandal, involving a transfer of one million dollars deposited into his personal account at the Société Tunisienne de Banque, was transferred to Investigation Office No. 26 of the Financial Judicial Pole.

In 2025 he was jailed for corruption.

== Personal life ==
Abdessalem is married to Soumaya Ghannouchi, the youngest daughter of Rached Ghannouchi, and is the father of two children.

== Bibliography ==
- In Religion: Secularism and Democracy (Book not referred)
- United States of America: Between Hard Power and Soft Power (Book not referred)
