= Dorah Ilunga =

Belgian politician

Dorah Ilunga (born June 28, 1968) is a Belgian politician of Congolese origin. She is the first black female échevin in Belgium. She is a member of the Socialist Party.

== Career ==
Born in Kinshasa, Democratic Republic of the Congo, Dorah Ilunga arrived in Belgium in 1986 for study without the intention of settling there. After earning a first degree in food, then a degree in science work from the Université libre de Bruxelles (ULB), she obtained a first job in a defense association of different interests, including all matters relating to citizenship. Then she coordinated several projects for development cooperation before entering the local mission of the Brussels municipality of Saint-Josse where she led a project for the integration of foreign-born minorities and another project of social cohesion.

Dorah handled worked on youth employment, training and other support for the unemployed plans. Meanwhile, after the municipal elections of 2000, she was appointed Advisor to CPAS (Public Centre for Social Welfare) of the municipality of Saint-Josse-ten-Noode where she served on the commission for granting the subsistence (minimum wage). Then joined the municipal council as first black échevin, a position she held until 2006. "It was not always obvious" is she recalls. "At the beginning, relationships are often based on fears and everyone inside wonder how to behave. Nevertheless, little by little, things settle. In short, I behaved in pioneering and so I had to fight. My situation was much more difficult than my mistakes have tarnished the image of the entire community that I come from."

== Controversy ==
=== December 2016 ===
On December 26, 2016, a 6-year-old boy was hospitalized after standing for hours in the cold on a balcony as punishment by his stepfather. The apartment where the events occurred appeared to be the official address of Dorah Ilunga. She also is the mother of the man who left the child in the cold. This case raised questions about the official home address of Mrs Ilunga. As she is supposed to be living with her mother in a social housing in the municipality, there is a strong indication she has given a false address and committed address fraud.

=== October 2023 ===
In October 2023, there was a public outcry on her expense notes.
