= Othman Jerandi =

Tunisian politician and diplomat

- عثمان الجرندي
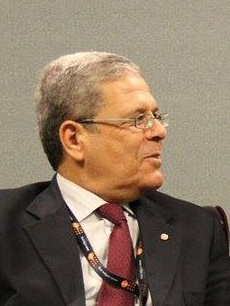

Minister of Foreign Affairs
- In office 2 September 2020 – 7 February 2023
- President: Kais Saied
- Prime Minister: Hichem Mechichi; Najla Bouden
- Preceded by: Selma Ennaifer
- Succeeded by: Nabil Ammar
- In office 13 March 2013 – 29 January 2014
- President: Moncef Marzouki
- Prime Minister: Ali Laarayedh
- Preceded by: Rafik Abdessalem
- Succeeded by: Mongi Hamdi

Personal details
- Born: 1951 (age 74–75) Hammam Lif, Tunisia

Othman Jerandi (Arabic: عثمان الجرندي; born 1951) is a Tunisian politician and diplomat who served as the Tunisian minister of foreign affairs from September 2020 to February 2023. He previously held the role from March 2013 to January 2014.

== Career ==
With a degree in communications, he started his career in 1979 in the government of Tunisian Prime Minister Hedi Amara Nouira, where he worked as a First Secretary in Tunis until 1981. He then served as a Secretary in Tunisia's embassy in Kuwait, before becoming a Counsellor for the embassy, a position he held until 1988, when he became a counsellor for Tunisia's Ministry of Foreign Affairs, before being moved to Tunisia's mission to the United Nations, a role in which he served until 1994.

From 1994 to 1997, Jerandi served as Tunisia's ambassador to Nigeria, Ghana, Sierra Leone and Liberia, residing in Lagos. He then worked as Tunisia's Director of Political, Economic and Cooperation Affairs with Africa and the African Union from 1998 to 2000.

In 2000, Jerandi was appointed Tunisia's Deputy Permanent Representative to the United Nation, in charge of the nation's membership in the Security Council, serving until 2002, when he became Tunisia's ambassador to South Korea, serving until 2005. In March 2002, he was elected Chairman of the commission on the Status of Women (CSW), an organ of the Social and Economic Council (ECOSOC). He held the role for two terms.

In 2005, Jerandi was appointed Director General of International Conferences and organizations, serving until his appointment as Chargé de mission in the cabinet of the Minister of Foreign Affairs, an office he held until 2010.

From 2010 to 2011, Jerandi served as Tunisia's ambassador to Jordan. He then served as Tunisia's Permanent Representative to the United Nations from August 2011 to November 2012. In March of 2013, he was appointed Minister of Foreign Affairs, a position he held until February 2014.

From 2014 to 2019, Jerandi worked as a consultant in international relations and multilateral diplomacy. From April to September 2020, he served as a Senior Diplomatic Adviser to Tunisian President Kais Saied. In September, he was appointed Minister of Foreign Affairs, Migration and Tunisians Abroad for a second time. During his tenure, the United States supported Tunisia's struggle with the COVID-19 pandemic, granting the nation 500,000 COVID vaccines.

On February 7, 2023, the Presidency of the Republic announced his dismissal and his replacement by Nabil Ammar.

Political offices
Preceded by Rafik Abdessalem	Minister of Foreign Affairs; 2013–2014	Succeeded by Mongi Hamdi
Preceded by Selma Ennaifer	Minister of Foreign Affairs; 2020–2023	Succeeded by Nabil Ammar
Incumbent
