= Address fraud =

Crime based on using a false address

Address fraud is a type of fraud in which the perpetrator uses an inaccurate or fictitious address to steal money or other benefit, or to hide from authorities. The crime may involve stating one's address as a place where s/he never lived, or continuing to use a previous address where one no longer lives as one's own. Laws pertaining to these types of crimes vary by location.

In one form of address fraud, the perpetrator uses a former address as their current address to receive mail by deliberately failing to report an address change and using the old address on legal documents.

In another form, a person misrepresents a communal mail box at their home as their exclusive address to take advantage of benefits available to others in the home.

== Motives for address fraud ==
The crime is often associated with identity theft, taking place in about one-third of identity theft cases.

Address fraud has been committed by parents attempting to get their children into a public school in a jurisdiction other than where they live. Public school systems generally require that students live in the municipality the school serves, and giving false information to gain admission is a crime.

People have used address fraud to vote in a jurisdiction other than their own. A notable example is Ann Coulter, who was investigated for voting in the wrong precinct.

Some drivers commit address fraud to take advantage of lenient laws in a jurisdiction they don't live in. For example, a person may not qualify for a driver's license in their own state, but may qualify in another. Most states require that new residents get a state driver's license within a certain time of establishing residency—for example, 60 days in Illinois. Not having a local state license is an additional offense in the event of a traffic violation. Some wealthy people set up an official address at a low rent location in a low tax jurisdiction to avoid higher taxes where they actually live. They live most of the time in their true home, but don't pay taxes there. People with bench warrants also use an old address to evade authorities.
