= Alejandro Ferrer López =

Panamanian politician and lawyer

Minister of Foreign Affairs of Panama
- In office 1 July 2019 – 2 December 2020
- President: Laurentino Cortizo

Minister of Commerce and Industries of Panama
- In office 2004–2008
- President: Martín Torrijos

Vice Minister of Foreign Affairs of Panama
- In office 1996–1997

Permanent Representative of Panama to the World Trade Organization
- In office 1994–1995

Personal details
- Born: Alejandro Guillermo Ferrer López; February 1, 1967 (age 59) Panama City, Panama
- Spouse: Irene Arias Galindo
- Children: 2
- Education: Universidad Católica Santa María La Antigua; University of Michigan
- Occupation: Lawyer, politician

Alejandro Guillermo Ferrer López (born February 1, 1967, in Panama City, Panama) is a Panamanian politician and lawyer. Minister of Commerce and Industry and served as Minister of Foreign Affairs of Panama from July 1, 2019, to December 2, 2020.

== Biography ==
He was born in Panama on February 1, 1967, son of Enna López de Ferrer and Alejandro Ferrer Stanziola. He is married to Irene Arias Galindo and has 2 daughters.

Ferrer graduated from Colegio La Salle and continued his university studies at the Universidad Católica Santa María La Antigua, where in 1990 he graduated with a degree in law and political science, summa cum laude. In 1992 he obtained a Master in Law and in 2000, a doctorate in law science from the University of Michigan, as a Fulbright Scholar. He also participated in a course on global leadership and public policies for the 21st century at Harvard University.

In 2008, Ferrer received the title of Global Young Leader of the World Economic Forum and the Integrity Award, Government Ethics category, from the Panamanian chapter of Transparency International. During his tenure, he was recognized along with the Electoral Tribunal as the entities with the greatest transparency in the obligation to inform by the Pro-Justice Citizen Alliance.

He was president of the Amador Foundation (Museum of Biodiversity) from 2006 to 2013.

== Political career ==
In 1993 he acted as legal advisor to the Adhesion Commission of Panama before the GATT and until 1994, he became Deputy Permanent Representative before that body. Between 1998 and 1999 he was a member of the Presidential Commission against Money Laundering, and in the periods 1996–1999 and 2008–2009, he was a member of the Council of Foreign Relations.

Between 1994 and 1995 he served as permanent ambassador to the World Trade Organization in Geneva, Switzerland and Alternate Ambassador to the United Nations and other international organizations. Between 1995 and 1996, he was Foreign Trade Advisor at the Embassy of Panama in Washington. Between 1996 and 1997 he was Vice Minister of Foreign Affairs.

=== Minister of Commerce and Industries ===
He was Minister of Commerce and Industries from 2004 to 2008, appointed by the then president Martín Torrijos Espino.

During his tenure as minister, Panama's exports exceeded US$1 billion for the first time. He also promoted legislation concerning multinational corporations, which was intended to attract international companies to establish regional offices in Panama.

=== Minister of Foreign Affairs ===
On May 22, 2019, he was appointed Minister of Foreign Affairs of Panama by President-elect Laurentino Cortizo Cohen.
