= Susu people =

Mande-speaking ethnic group

Susu/Sosso
ߛߐߛߐߞߊ
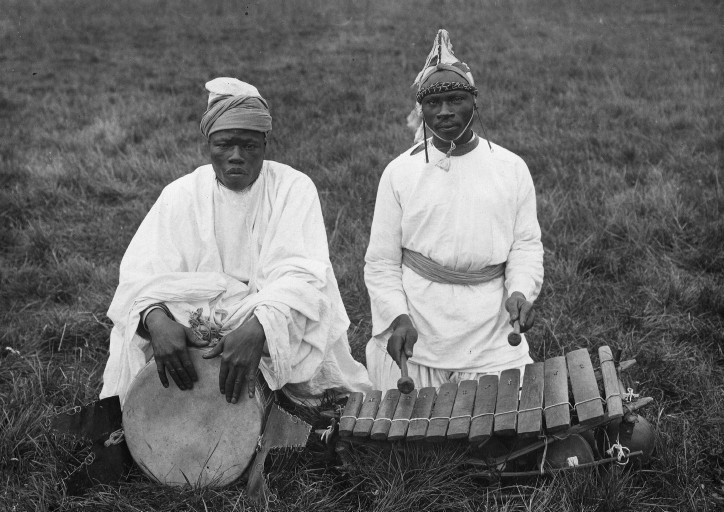
- Susu men with a membrane drum and a balafon in 1935

Total population
- c. 3 million

Regions with significant populations
- Guinea: 2,730,115 (21.2%)
- Sierra Leone: 203,780 (2.9%)
- Senegal: 112,000 (0.62%)
- Guinea Bissau: 5,600 (0.36%)
- Gambia: 5,300

Languages
- Susu, French, English, Krio

Religion
- Sunni Islam

Related ethnic groups
- Yalunka people, Mandinka people Jakhanke, Soninke, Nalu

The Susu or Soussou people are a Mande-speaking ethnic group living primarily in Guinea and northwestern Sierra Leone, particularly in Kambia District. Smaller communities are also found in Guinea-Bissau and Senegal. They speak the Susu language, Sosoxui, which is closely related to the Yalunka language. The language has historically served as a regional trade language, especially around Conakry. The Susu are believed to have Soninke roots and connections to the medieval Sosso Empire, tracing their origins to early Mande populations in the western Sahel. They are said to have originally been a section of the Soninke people that migrated out of Wagadou and were initially a clan of blacksmiths who displayed their clear intentions to object converting to Islam. Over time, a significant number of Sosso groups moved westward, settling in the Fouta Djallon highlands and eventually along the Atlantic coast.

Susu society is patrilineal and predominantly Muslim. They have caste systems similar to other Mande populations, with artisan groups such as blacksmiths, leatherworkers, musicians, and jewelers. Traditionally, the Susu engage in rice cultivation, fishing, salt production, and trade. In modern Guinea, they have played a significant role in political leadership and administration. Susu culture places a strong emphasis on family and community ties, with extended families often living close together and supporting one another in social and economic activities. Traditional music, dance, and oral storytelling remain central to Susu cultural life, preserving histories, social values, and religious practices. Marriage is typically arranged within extended family networks, and polygyny is practiced in accordance with Islamic traditions. Despite urbanization and modernization, many Susu continue to maintain traditional livelihoods alongside participation in national and regional economies.

== Demographics and language ==
Their language, called Sosokhoui or Sosoxui by native speakers, serves as a major trade language along the Guinean coast, particularly in its southwest, including the capital city of Conakry. Closely related to Yalunka language, Susu has also been influenced by neighboring languages, including Mandinka language, Soninke language and Kpelle language. Susu is classified within the Soso-Yalunka branch of the Mande languages, which is part of the broader Niger-Congo language family.

In the Susu language, "Guinea" means woman and this is the derivation for the country's name.

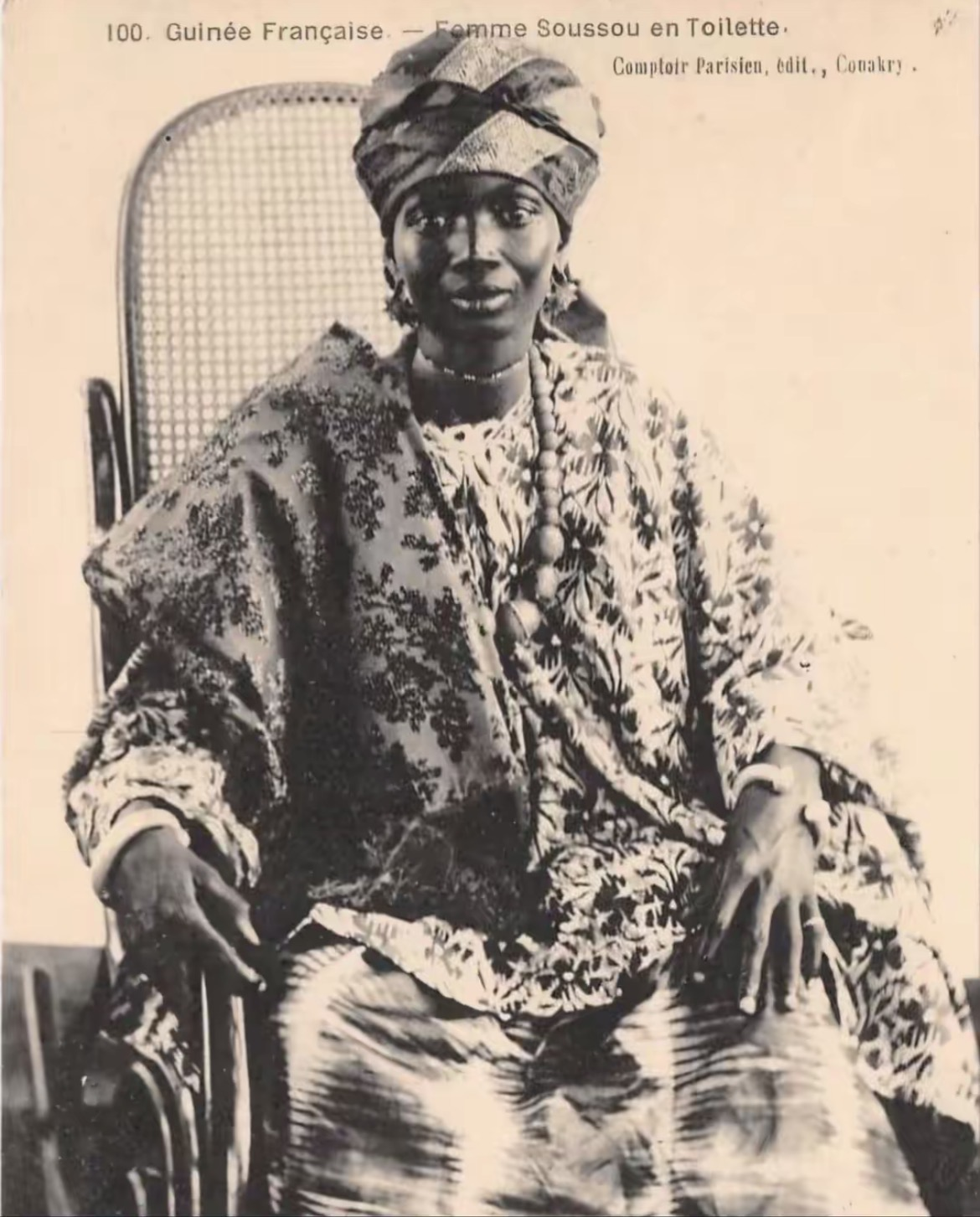
Sosso woman

== Ethnonymy ==
The Susu people are also referred to as Soosoo, Sossoé, Sosoe, Sosso, Soso, Sousou, Susso, Sussu, or Soussou. Most of those denominations are European as the Susu people tend to call themselves "Sossoka" or "Sossé''

The meaning of the name "Soso" or "Susu" apparently derived from "Susuwi," meaning "horse" or "horseman" in the Susu language. The terms "Sawsaws," "Souses," and "Sussias" are all English corruptions of "Susu," rarer variants of their name are also encountered such as Souzo, Caxi, Saxi, Saxe, and even as Sexi.

== History ==
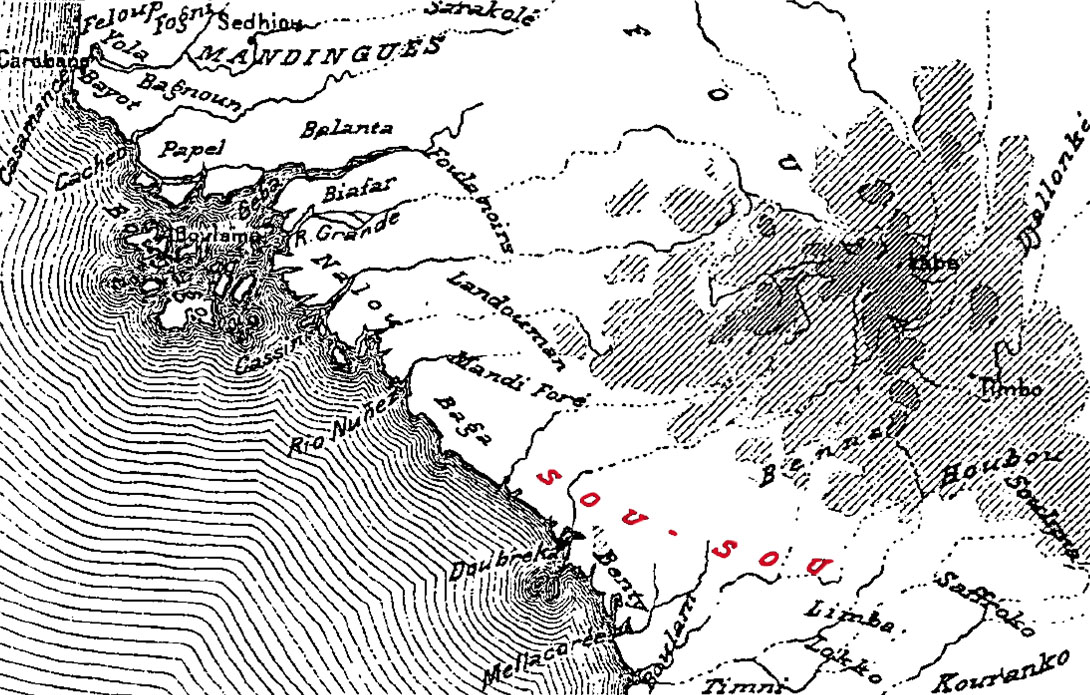
An ethnic map of the Upper Guinea Coast in the 19th century, drawn by Élisée Reclus. The Susu people region is marked "sou-sou" in red.

The Susu are descendants of their Manding ancestors who lived in the mountainous Mali-Guinea border. They are said to have originally been a section of the Soninke people that migrated out of Wagadou and were initially a clan of blacksmiths who displayed their clear intentions to object converting to Islam. In the twelfth century, when the ancient Ghana Empire was in decline, they migrated south and established a capital city of Soso in the mountainous region of Koulikoro. The Susu were once ruled by Sumanguru Kanté, but after that, they were ruled by the thirteenth century Mali Empire. In the fifteenth century, they migrated west to the Fouta Djallon plateau of Guinea, as the Mali Empire disintegrated. Fouta Djallon, historically known as Dialonkadugu, is a mountainous plateau in central Guinea. Before the 18th century, the region was primarily inhabited by the Yalunka people (Dialonké), a Mande-speaking group whose name is commonly interpreted as "inhabitants of the mountains."

Because of its rugged and relatively isolated terrain, Fouta Djallon functioned as a refuge during periods of warfare and political instability in the wider Mandé sphere associated with the Mali Empire. Neighboring populations, including groups such as the Mandinka people, migrated into the highlands over time, where communities mixed and gradually assimilated into the dominant highland culture. The Yalunka and the Susu people were once members of the same group in the Fouta Djallon, separated by Fula invaders in the 18th century. The Susu moved southward along the coast, absorbing other people in the process. The Susu people were traditionally animist.

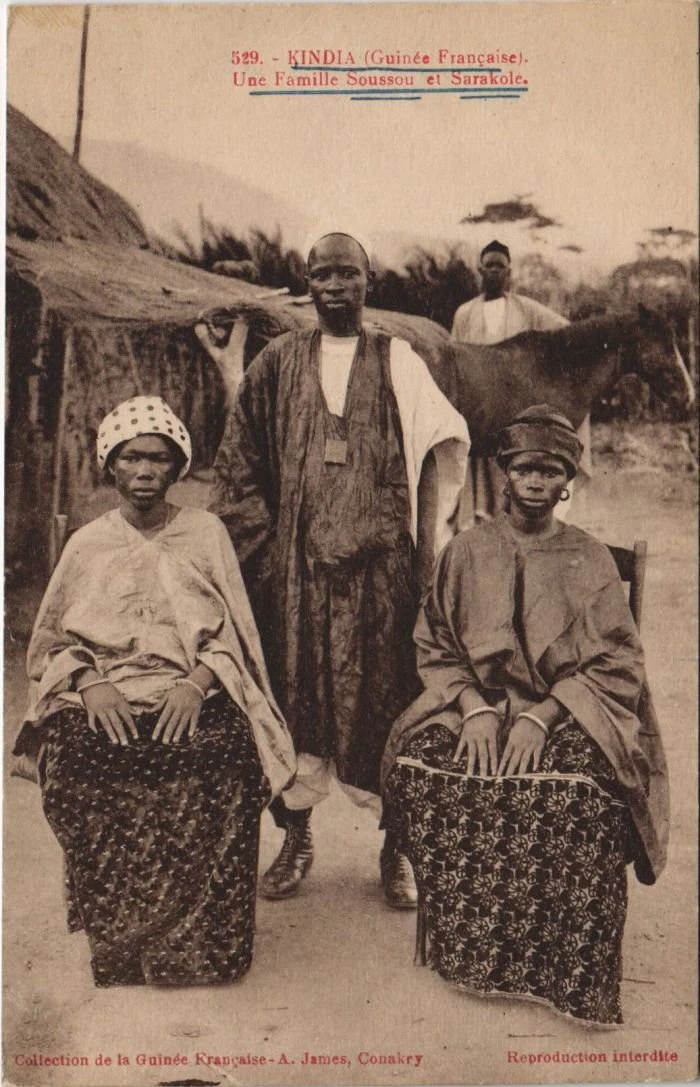
A Susu and Soninke family from Kindia in 1901

Portuguese explorers and chroniclers of the 15th and 16th centuries provide some of the earliest written records of the Soso and Yalunka (Jalonke) peoples. These sources describe a kingdom called "Jalo Concho" in the Upper Niger region and Fouta Jallon, centered on the Susu and Yalunka. This written evidence supports oral histories of a pre-Fula political entity and connects to earlier Arabic chronicles mentioning the enigmatic Sosso Empire, suggesting continuity between the Sosso Empire and the later "Jalo Koni" kingdom.

The records, including writings by Valentim Fernandes and Duarte Pacheco Pereira (1505–1508), note that the Soso and Yalunka practiced animism, maintained organized caste systems, and were active in regional trade networks. They also document conflicts with neighboring groups, including wars against the Mané, illustrating the political and military dynamics of the period. These Portuguese accounts bridge earlier Arabic chronicles and modern historical analysis, providing valuable information on the geography, culture, religion, and socio-political organization of the Soso and Yalunka peoples, who, despite their Soninke roots, have developed a distinct ethnic culture and language.

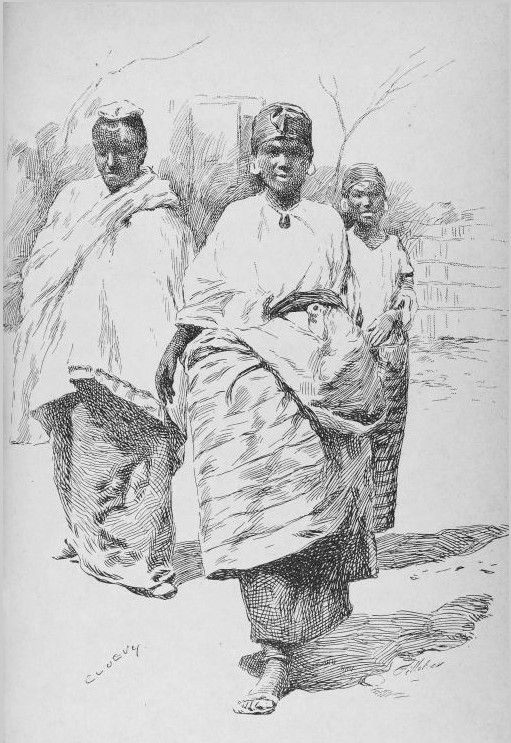
Three Susu women in 1894

The Fula people dominated the region from the Fouta Djallon. The Fulani created an Islamic theocracy, thereafter began slave raids as a part of Jihad that impacted many West African ethnic groups including the Susu people. In particular, states Ismail Rashid, the Jihad effort of Fulani elites starting in the 1720s theologically justified enslavement of the non-Islamic people and also led to successful conversion of previously animist peoples to Islam. The political environment led the Susu people to convert to Islam in the seventeenth and eighteenth century, along with further westward and southward migration towards the plains of Guinea. On the Atlantic coast, they assimilated with the local peoples like the Nalu, Baga, Landouma and dominated the estuarine region north of Sierra Leone.

The colonial-era Europeans arrived in the Guinea region of resident Susu people in the late eighteenth century for trade, but got politically involved during the era of Temne wars that attacked the Susu people along with other ethnic groups. While Temne sought British support, the Susu sought the French. The region split, with Temne speaking Sierra Leone regions going with the British colonial empire, and Susu speaking Guinea regions becoming a part of the French colonial empire in the late nineteenth century during the Scramble for Africa.

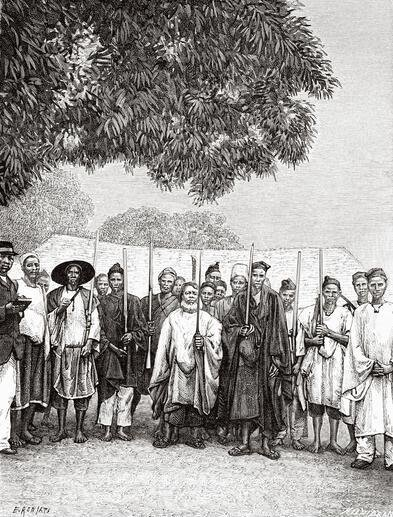
Warriors from Dubréka in the 19th century

The regions of Kindia and Dubréka were historically important centers of Susu political authority in coastal Guinea prior to and during the early phase of French colonial expansion. The Susu had been established in the coastal plains for centuries, where they developed decentralized political systems based on lineage authority, Islamic legitimacy, and regional trade. Dubréka functioned as a prominent Susu chiefdom in the 18th and 19th centuries and played a strategic role in coastal trade and diplomacy. One documented manga (ruler) of the region was Balé Demba (also known as Manga Balé Demba), a Susu leader believed to be a descendant of Soumba Toumany, the founder of the Kingdom of Dubréka. Balé Demba concluded a protectorate agreement with French authorities in 1880, facilitating the extension of French control along the Guinean coast. Kindia, situated inland from Dubréka, was another major Susu political center and served as a hub of commerce between the coast and the Futa Jallon highlands. Morlaye Sylla is attested in late 19th-century French administrative records as a Susu chief of Kindia and a representative of local authority during the early colonial period. Together, Kindia and Dubréka illustrate the Susu model of localized kingship, which differed from the centralized Islamic states of the Futa Jallon by emphasizing autonomous chiefdoms rather than a unified theocratic government.

== Society and culture ==
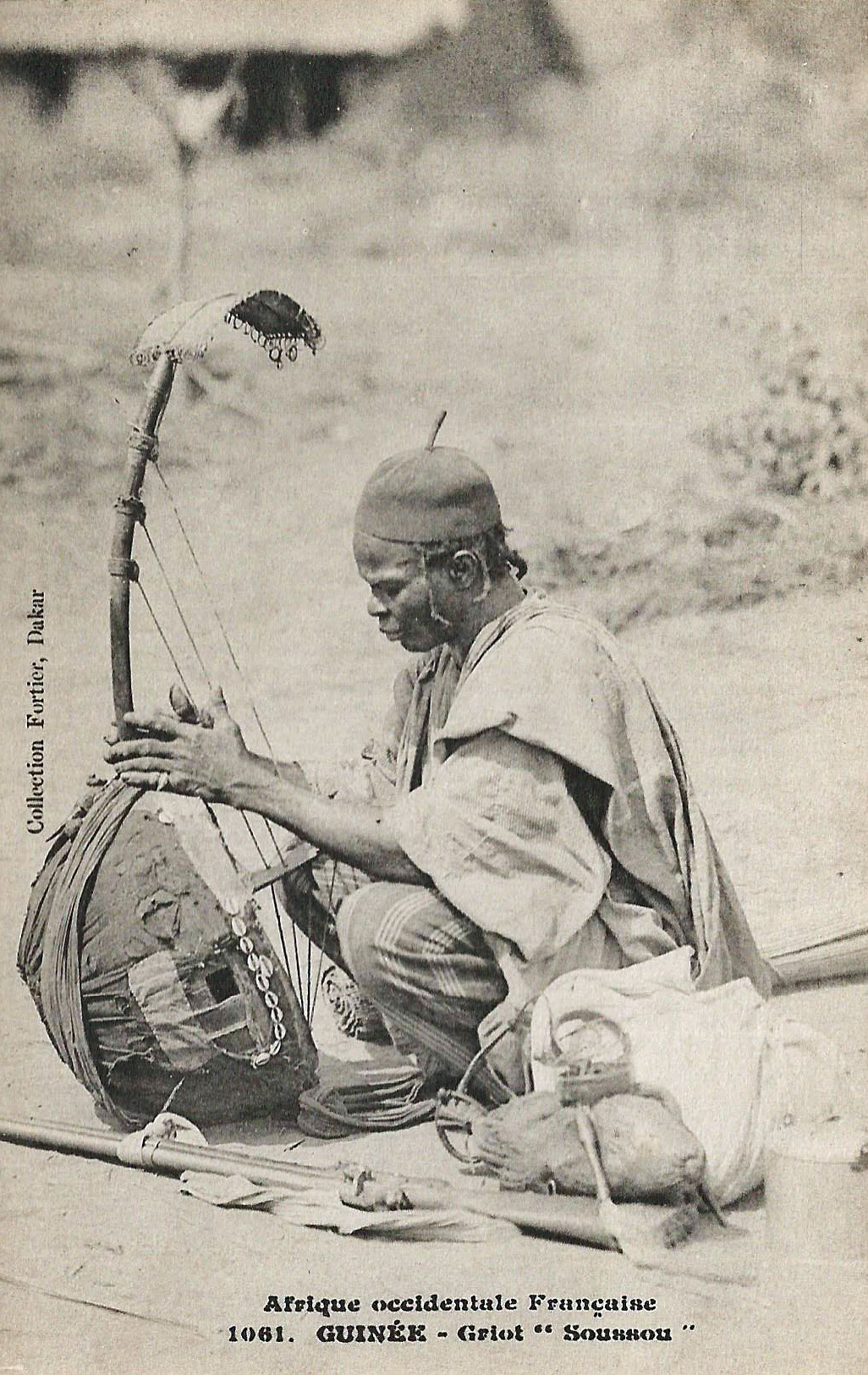
A Susu yeliba playing a three-string bolon in 1905

The Susu live with their extended family. Polygyny is an accepted practice since Islamic law allows men to have as many as four wives. This is not always practiced because having multiple wives requires more means than most men have. The men provide for their families by working the rice fields, fishing, or engaging in trade. The women cook the food and take care of the children. They often engage in small commerce, usually of vegetables they have raised in their garden. Often women will have their room or hut next to their husband's lodging where they will stay with their children.

Over 99% of Susu are Muslim, and Islam dominates their religious culture and practices. Most Islamic holidays are observed, the most important being the celebration that follows Ramadan (a month of prayer and fasting).After Ramadan, Eid is celebrated, and people wear traditional clothing and bazin. The Susu people, like other Manding-speaking peoples, have a caste system regionally referred to by terms such as Nyamakala, Naxamala and Galabbolalauba. According to David Conrad and Barbara Frank, the terms and social categories in this caste-based social stratification system of Susu people shows cases of borrowing from Arabic only, but the likelihood is that these terms are linked to Latin, Greek or Aramaic.

The artisans among the Susu people, such as smiths, carpenters, musicians, and bards (Yeliba), jewelers, and leatherworkers, are separate castes. The Susu castes are not limited to Guinea, but are found in other regions where Susu people live, such as in Sierra Leone where they are linked to the historic slavery system that existed in the region, states Daniel Harmon. The Susu castes in the regional Muslim communities were prevalent and recorded by sociologists in the late nineteenth and early twentieth centuries.

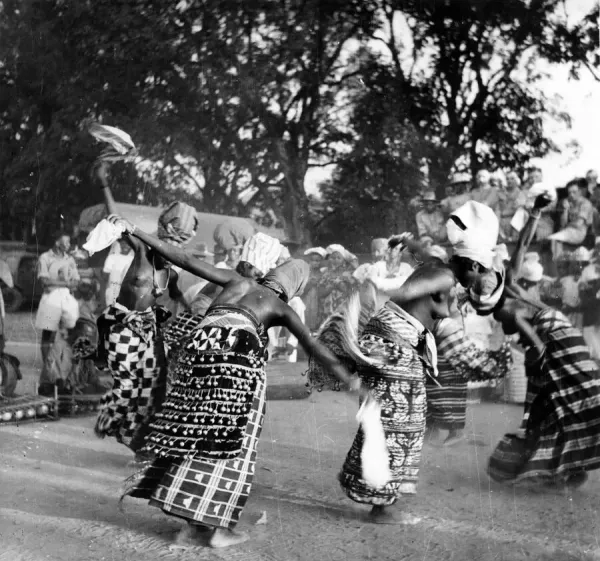
Traditional dance by Susu women in 1944, Sierra Leone

The Susu people also use practices of the Bondo secret society which aims at gradually but firmly establishing attitudes related to adulthood in girls, discussions on fertility, morality and proper sexual comportment. The society also maintains an interest in the well-being of its members throughout their lives.

The Susu are primarily farmers, with rice and millet being their two principal crops. Mangoes, pineapples, and coconuts are also grown. The Susu are also known as skilled traders and blacksmiths. The women make various kinds of palm oil from palm nuts. Ancient Susu houses were typically made of either mud or cement blocks, depending on the resources available.

=== Susu patronyms ===
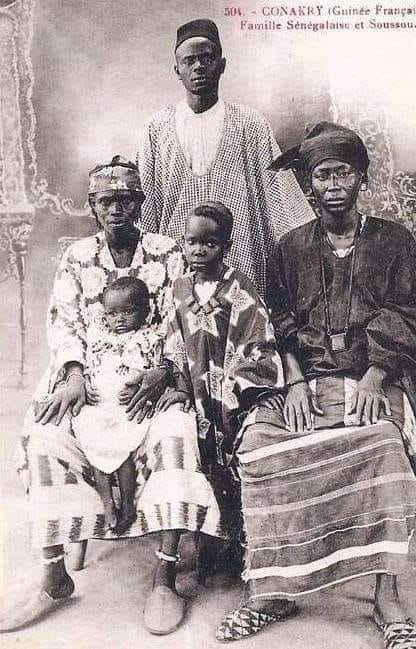
A Susu family from Senegal (504 cpc)

Some common surnames used by the Susu are:

- Conté
- Yansané
- Fofana
- Sylla or Sillah
- Soumah
- Kouyaté
- Yeressa
- Bangoura or Bangura
- Kante
- Samoura or Samura
- Yattara
- Kourouma
- Sankhon
- Youla
- Touré
- Diarso
- Daffé
- Cissé or Ceesay
- Diarré
- Camara or Kamara
- Traore
- Keita

== Notable Susu people ==
=== Political figures ===
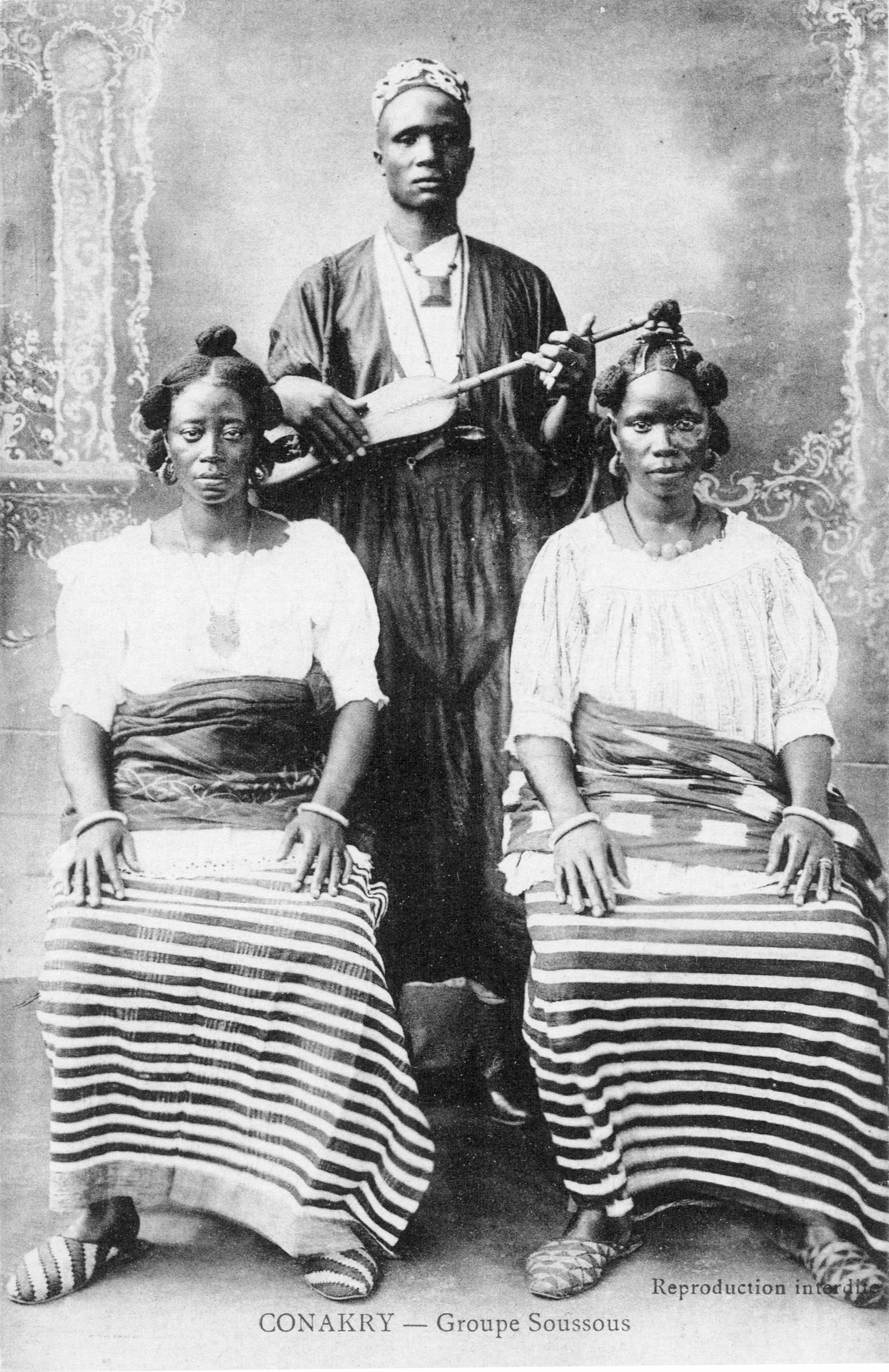
A Susu griot holds a lute, standing behind two sitting women. Mande speakers (of which Susu people are among) call their lutes nkoni or ngoni.

- Fodé Bangoura, Guinean politician and former minister secretary general to President Lansana Conté
- Karim Bangoura, Guinean diplomat
- Mafory Bangoura, radical activist for the independence of Guinea
- Mahawa Bangoura, Guinean diplomat
- Abdoul Kabèlè Camara, Guinean politician
- Arafan Camara, Guinean politician
- Makalé Camara, Guinean diplomat
- M'Balia Camara, Guinean independence activist
- Zeinab Camara, Guinean politician
- Lansana Conté, president of Guinea 1984–2008
- Abdulai Conteh, former vice president of Sierra Leone
- Kandeh Baba Conteh, Sierra Leonean politician
- Ahmed Ramadan Dumbuya, Sierra Leonean politician
- Ibrahima Kassory Fofana, former prime minister of Guinea
- Mohamed Said Fofana, former prime minister of Guinea
- Soumaoro Kanté, thirteenth-century king of the Sosso Empire
- Fodé Soumah, Guinean politician
- Facinet Touré, Guinean politician and former soldier of the French colonial army
- Kerfalla Yansané, ambassador of Guinea to the United States
- Osman Foday Yansaneh, Sierra Leonean politician
- Mamady Youla, prime minister of Guinea 2015–2018
- Kandeh Yumkella, Sierra Leonean politician

=== Musicians ===
- Mohamed Bangoura, Guinean drummer
- Momo Wandel Soumah, Guinean musician
- Maciré Sylla, Guinean musician

=== Sportspeople ===
- Abdoul Karim Bangoura, Guinean footballer
- Alhassane Bangoura, Guinean footballer
- Alkhaly Bangoura, Guinean footballer
- Facinet Bangoura, Guinean swimmer
- Ibrahima Bangoura, Guinean footballer
- Ismaël Bangoura, Guinean footballer
- Ismaël Karba Bangoura, Guinean footballer
- Kilé Bangoura, Guinean footballer
- Lappé Bangoura, Guinean football coach
- Mamadama Bangoura, Guinean judoka
- Mamadouba Bangoura, Guinean footballer
- Mohamed Bangoura, Guinean footballer
- Momar Bangoura, French footballer
- Ousmane Bangoura, Guinean footballer
- Pierre Bangoura, Guinean footballer
- Sambégou Bangoura, Guinean footballer
- Yady Bangoura, Guinean footballer
- Mohamed Bangura, Sierra Leonean footballer
- Abdoul Camara, Guinean footballer
- Abou Mangué Camara, Guinean footballer
- Alsény Camara, Guinean footballer
- Alsény Camara, Guinean footballer
- Aguibou Camara, Guinean footballer
- Dede Camara, Guinean swimmer
- Ibrahima Sory Camara, Guinean footballer
- Kémoko Camara, Guinean footballer
- Mady Camara, Guinean footballer
- Naby Camara, Guinean footballer
- Souleymane Camara, Senegalese footballer
- Abdoulaye Cissé, Guinean footballer
- Abdu Conté, Bissau-Guinean footballer
- Ibrahima Sory Conté, Guinean footballer
- Naby Diarso, Guinean footballer
- Boubacar Fofana, Guinean footballer
- Naby Keïta, Guinean footballer
- Ibrahima Sory Sankhon, Guinean footballer
- Chérif Souleymane, Guinean footballer
- Issiaga Soumah, Guinean footballer
- M'mah Soumah, Guinean judoka
- Morlaye Soumah, Guinean footballer
- Naby Soumah, Guinean footballer
- Ndèye Fatou Soumah, Senegalese sprinter
- Richard Soumah, Guinean footballer
- Seydouba Soumah, Guinean footballer
- Soriba Soumah, Guinean footballer
- Lamin Suma, Sierra Leonean footballer
- Sheriff Suma, Sierra Leonean footballer
- Abdoul Karim Sylla, Guinean footballer
- Idrissa Sylla, Guinean footballer
- Issiaga Sylla, Guinean footballer
- Kanfory Sylla, Guinean footballer
- Mohamed Lamine Sylla, Guinean footballer
- Mohamed Ofei Sylla, Guinean footballer
- Momo Sylla, Guinean footballer
- Morciré Sylla, Guinean footballer
- Morlaye Sylla, Guinean footballer
- Sekou Oumar Sylla, Guinean footballer
- Djibril Fandjé Touré, Guinean footballer
- Momo Yansané, Guinean footballer
- Ibrahima Yattara, Guinean footballer
- Mohamed Yattara, Guinean footballer
- Naby Yattara, Guinean footballer
- Souleymane Youla, Guinean footballer

=== Other notable people ===
- Tigui Camara, Guinean entrepreneur
- Ousmane Conté, Lansana Conté's son
- Souleymane Sylla, Guinean actor
- Harry Yansaneh, Sierra Leonean journalist
