= List of foreign ministers in 2021 =

This is a list of foreign ministers in 2021.

== Africa ==
- Algeria –
  1. Sabri Boukadoum (2019–2021)
  2. Ramtane Lamamra (2021–present)
- Angola – Tete António (2020–present)
- Benin – Aurélien Agbénonci (2016–present)
- Botswana – Lemogang Kwape (2020–present)
- Burkina Faso –
  1. Alpha Barry (2016–2021)
  2. Rosine Sori-Coulibaly (2021–2021)
- Burundi – Albert Shingiro (2020–present)
- Cameroon - Lejeune Mbella Mbella (2015–present)
- Cape Verde –
  1. Luís Felipe Tavares (2016–2021)
  2. Rui Figueiredo Soares (2021–present)
- Central African Republic – Sylvie Baïpo-Temon (2018–present)
- Chad –
  1. Amine Abba Sidick (2020–2021)
  2. Mahamat Zene Cherif (2021–present)
- Comoros – Dhoihir Dhoulkamal (2020–present)
- Congo–Brazzaville (Republic of the Congo) – Jean-Claude Gakosso (2015–present)
- Congo–Kinshasa (Democratic Republic of the Congo) –
  1. Marie Tumba Nzeza (2019–2021)
  2. Christophe Lutundula (2021–present)
- Djibouti – Mahamoud Ali Youssouf (2005–present)
- Egypt – Sameh Shoukry (2014–present)
- Equatorial Guinea – Simeón Oyono Esono Angue (2018–present)
- Eritrea – Osman Saleh Mohammed (2007–present)
- Ethiopia – Demeke Mekonnen (2020–present)
- Gabon – Pacôme Moubelet Boubeya (2020–2022)
- The Gambia – Mamadou Tangara (2018–present)
- Ghana – Shirley Ayorkor Botchway (2017–present)
- Guinea –
  1. Mamadi Touré (2017–2021)
  2. Ibrahima Khalil Kaba (2021)
  3. Morissanda Kouyaté (2021–present)
- Guinea-Bissau – Suzi Barbosa (2020–present)
- Ivory Coast (Côte d'Ivoire) –
  1. Ally Coulibaly (2020–2021)
  2. Kandia Camara (2021–present)
- Kenya – Raychelle Omamo (2020–present)
- Lesotho – 'Matšepo Ramakoae (2020–present)
- Liberia – Dee-Maxwell Saah Kemayah, Sr (2020–present)
- Libya
  - Government of House of Representatives of Libya (Government of Libya internationally recognized to 2016) – Abdulhadi Elhweg (2019–2021)
  - Government of National Accord of Libya (Interim government internationally recognized as the sole legitimate government of Libya from 2016) – Mohamed Taha Siala (2016–2021)
  - Government of National Unity of Libya – Najla Mangoush (2021–present)
- Madagascar –
  1. Djacoba Liva Tehindrazanarivelo (2020–2021)
  2. Patrick Rajoelina (2021–2022)
- Malawi – Eisenhower Mkaka (2020–2022)
- Mali –
  1. Zeïni Moulaye (2020–2021)
  2. Abdoulaye Diop (2021–present)
- Mauritania – Ismail Ould Cheikh Ahmed (2018–present)
- Mauritius –
  1. Nando Bodha (2019–2021)
  2. Alan Ganoo (2021–present)
- Morocco – Nasser Bourita (2017–present)
- Mozambique – Verónica Macamo (2020–present)
- Namibia – Netumbo Nandi-Ndaitwah (2012–present)
- Niger –
  1. Marou Amadou (acting) (2020–2021)
  2. Hassoumi Massoudou (2021–present)
- Nigeria – Geoffrey Onyeama (2015–present)
- Rwanda – Vincent Biruta (2019–present)
- Sahrawi Arab Democratic Republic – Mohamed Salem Ould Salek (1998–2023)
- São Tomé and Príncipe – Edite Tenjua (2020–present)
- Senegal – Aïssata Tall Sall (2020–present)
- Seychelles – Sylvestre Radegonde (2020–2025)
- Sierra Leone –
  1. Nabeela Tunis (2019–2021)
  2. David J. Francis (2021–present)
- Somalia –
  - Mohamed Abdirizak Mohamud (2020–2021)
  - Abdisaid Muse Ali (2021–present)
- Somaliland – Essa Kayd (2020–present)
- South Africa – Naledi Pandor (2019–present)
- South Sudan –
  1. Beatrice Wani-Noah (2020–2021)
  2. Mayiik Ayii Deng (2021–present)
- Sudan –
  1. Omer Ismail (acting) (2020–2021)
  2. Mariam al-Mahdi (2021)
  3. Abdalla Omar Bashir (acting) (2021–2022)
- Swaziland – Thuli Dladla (2018–present)
- Tanzania –
  1. Palamagamba John Aidan Mwaluko Kabudi (2019–2021)
  2. Liberata Mulamula (2021–present)
- Togo – Robert Dussey (2013–present)
- Tunisia – Othman Jerandi (2020–present)
- Uganda –
  1. Sam Kutesa (2005–2021)
  2. Jeje Odongo (2021–present)
- Zambia –
  1. Joe Malanji (2018–2021)
  2. Stanley Kakubo (2021–present)
- Zimbabwe –
  1. Sibusiso Moyo (2017–2021)
  2. Amon Murwira (acting) (2021)
  3. Frederick Shava (2021–present)

== Asia ==
- Abkhazia –
  1. Daur Kove (2016–2021)
  2. Inal Ardzinba (2021–present)
- Afghanistan
  - Islamic Republic of Afghanistan – Mohammad Hanif Atmar (2020–2021)
  - Islamic Emirate of Afghanistan – Amir Khan Muttaqi (acting) (2021–present)
- Armenia –
  1. Ara Ayvazyan (2020–2021)
  2. Armen Gevondyan (acting) (2021)
  3. Armen Grigoryan (acting) (2021)
  4. Ararat Mirzoyan (2021–present)
- Artsakh –
  1. Masis Mayilyan (2017–2021)
  2. David Babayan (2021–present)
- Azerbaijan – Jeyhun Bayramov (2020–present)
- Bahrain – Abdullatif bin Rashid Al Zayani (2020–present)
- Bangladesh – Abulkalam Abdul Momen (2019–present)
- Bhutan – Tandi Dorji (2018–present)
- Brunei – Hassanal Bolkiah (2015–present)
- Cambodia – Prak Sokhonn (2016–present)
- China – Wang Yi (2013–present)
- East Timor – Adaljíza Magno (2020–present)
- Georgia – Davit Zalkaliani (2018–present)
- India – Subrahmanyam Jaishankar (2019–present)
- Indonesia – Retno Marsudi (2014–present)
- Iran –
  1. Mohammad Javad Zarif (2013–2021)
  2. Hossein Amir-Abdollahian (2021–present)
- Iraq – Fuad Hussein (2020–present)
  - Kurdistan – Safeen Muhsin Dizayee (2019–present)
- Israel –
  1. Gabi Ashkenazi (2020–2021)
  2. Yair Lapid (2021–present)
- Japan –
  1. Toshimitsu Motegi (2019–2021)
  2. Fumio Kishida (2021)
  3. Yoshimasa Hayashi (2021–present)
- Jordan – Ayman Safadi (2017–present)
- Kazakhstan – Mukhtar Tleuberdi (2019–present)
- North Korea (Democratic People's Republic of Korea) – Ri Son-gwon (2020–present)
- South Korea (Republic of Korea) –
  1. Kang Kyung-wha (2017–2021)
  2. Chung Eui-yong (2021–2022)
- Kuwait – Sheikh Ahmad Nasser Al Muhammad Al Sabah (2019–present)
- Kyrgyzstan –Ruslan Kazakbayev (2020–present)
- Laos – Saleumxay Kommasith (2016–present)
- Lebanon –
  1. Charbel Wehbe (2020–2021)
  2. Zeina Akar (acting) (2021)
  3. Abdallah Bou Habib (2021–present)
- Malaysia –
  1. Hishammuddin Hussein (2020–2021)
  2. Saifuddin Abdullah (2021–present)
- Maldives – Abdulla Shahid (2018–present)
- Mongolia –
  1. Nyamtseren Enkhtaivan (2020–2021)
  2. Batmunkh Battsetseg (2021–present)
- Myanmar
  - Myanmar –
    1. Aung San Suu Kyi (2016–2021)
    2. Wunna Maung Lwin (2021–present)
  - National Unity Government of Myanmar (body claiming to be the legitimate government of Myanmar (Burma), existing in parallel with State Administration Council military junta) - Zin Mar Aung (2021–present)
- Nepal –
  1. Pradeep Gyawali (2018–2021)
  2. Raghubir Mahaseth (2021)
  3. KP Sharma Oli (2021)
  4. Sher Bahadur Deuba (2021)
  5. Narayan Khadka (2021–present)
- Oman – Badr bin Hamad Al Busaidi (2020–present)
- Pakistan – Shah Mehmood Qureshi (2018–present)
- Palestine – Riyad al-Maliki (2007–present)
- Philippines – Teodoro Locsin Jr. (2018–2022)
- Qatar – Sheikh Mohammed bin Abdulrahman Al Thani (2016–present)
- Saudi Arabia – Prince Faisal bin Farhan Al Saud (2019–present)
- Singapore – Vivian Balakrishnan (2015–present)
- South Ossetia – Dmitry Medoyev (2017–present)
- Sri Lanka –
  1. Dinesh Gunawardena (2019–2021)
  2. Gamini Lakshman Peiris (2021–present)
- Syria (Syrian Arab Republic) – Faisal Mekdad (2020–2024)
- Taiwan (Republic of China) – Joseph Wu (2018–present)
- Tajikistan – Sirodjidin Aslov (2013–present)
- Thailand – Don Pramudwinai (2015–present)
- Turkey – Mevlüt Çavuşoğlu (2015–present)
- Turkmenistan – Raşit Meredow (2001–present)
- United Arab Emirates – Sheikh Abdullah bin Zayed Al Nahyan (2006–present)
- Uzbekistan – Abdulaziz Komilov (2012–present)
- Vietnam –
  1. Phạm Bình Minh (2011–2021)
  2. Bùi Thanh Sơn (2021–present)
- Yemen
  - Republic of Yemen – Ahmad Awad Bin Mubarak (2020–present)
  - Supreme Political Council (unrecognised, rival government) – Hisham Abdullah (2016–present)

== Europe ==
- Albania – Olta Xhaçka (2020–present)
- Andorra – Maria Ubach i Font (2017–present)
- Austria –
  1. Alexander Schallenberg (2019–2021)
  2. Michael Linhart (2021)
  3. Alexander Schallenberg (2021–present)
- Belarus
  - Belarus – Vladimir Makei (2012–present)
  - National Anti-Crisis Management (‘Shadow-government-like" organisation) - Anatoly Kotov (2020–present)
- Belgium – Sophie Wilmès (2020–present)
  - Brussels - Pascal Smet (2019–present)
  - Flanders - Jan Jambon (2019–present)
  - Wallonia - Elio Di Rupo (2019–present)
- Bosnia and Herzegovina – Bisera Turković (2019–2023)
- Bulgaria –
  1. Ekaterina Zakharieva (2017–2021)
  2. Svetlan Stoev (2021)
  3. Teodora Genchovska (2021–present)
- Croatia – Gordan Grlić-Radman (2019–present)
- Cyprus – Nikos Christodoulides (2018–2022)
- Czech Republic –
  1. Tomáš Petříček (2018–2021)
  2. Jan Hamáček (acting) (2021)
  3. Jakub Kulhánek (2021)
  4. Jan Lipavský (2021–present)
- Denmark – Jeppe Kofod (2019–present)
  - Faroe Islands – Jenis av Rana (2019–present)
- Donetsk People's Republic – Natalya Nikonorova (2016–present)
- Estonia –
  1. Urmas Reinsalu (2019–2021)
  2. Eva-Maria Liimets (2021–present)
- Finland – Pekka Haavisto (2019–present)
- France – Jean-Yves Le Drian (2017–present)
- Germany –
  1. Heiko Maas (2018–2021)
  2. Annalena Baerbock (2021–present)
- Greece – Nikos Dendias (2019–present)
- Guernsey – Jonathan Le Tocq (2016–present)
- Hungary – Péter Szijjártó (2014–present)
- Iceland –
  1. Guðlaugur Þór Þórðarson (2017–2021)
  2. Þórdís Kolbrún R. Gylfadóttir (2021–present)
- Ireland – Simon Coveney (2017–present)
- Italy – Luigi Di Maio (2019–present)
- Jersey – Ian Gorst (2018–present)
- Kosovo –
  1. Meliza Haradinaj-Stublla (2020–2021)
  2. Besnik Tahirij (2021)
  3. Donika Gërvalla-Schwarz (2021–present)
- Latvia – Edgars Rinkēvičs (2011–2023)
- Liechtenstein –
  1. Katrin Eggenberger (2019–2021)
  2. Dominique Hasler (2021–present)
- Lithuania – Gabrielius Landsbergis (2020–present)
- Lugansk People's Republic – Vladislav Deinevo (2017–present)
- Luxembourg – Jean Asselborn (2004–present)
- Malta – Evarist Bartolo (2020–present)
- Moldova –
  1. Aureliu Ciocoi (2020–2021)
  2. Nicu Popescu (2021–present)
  - Gagauzia – Vitaliy Vlah (2015–present)
- Monaco – Laurent Anselmi (2019–2022)
- Montenegro – Đorđe Radulović (2020–present)
- Netherlands –
  1. Stef Blok (2018–2021)
  2. Sigrid Kaag (2021)
  3. Tom de Bruijn (acting) (2021)
  4. Ben Knapen (2021–2022)
- North Macedonia – Bujar Osmani (2020–present)
- Northern Cyprus – Tahsin Ertuğruloğlu (2020–2022)
- Norway –
  1. Ine Marie Eriksen Søreide (2017–2021)
  2. Anniken Huitfeldt (2021–present)
- Poland – Zbigniew Rau (2020–present)
- Portugal – Augusto Santos Silva (2015–2022)
- Romania – Bogdan Aurescu (2019–present)
- Russia – Sergey Lavrov (2004–present)
- San Marino – Luca Beccari (2020–present)
- Serbia – Nikola Selaković (2020–present)
- Slovakia –
  1. Ivan Korčok (2020–2021)
  2. Jaroslav Naď (acting) (2021)
  3. Ivan Korčok (2021–present)
- Slovenia – Anže Logar (2020–present)
- Spain –
  1. Arancha González Laya (2020–2021)
  2. José Manuel Albares (2021–present)
  - Catalonia –
    1. Bernat Solé (2020–2021)
    2. Victòria Alsina Burgués (2021–present)
- Sweden – Ann Linde (2019–present)
- Switzerland – Ignazio Cassis (2017–present)
- Transnistria – Vitaly Ignatiev (2015–present)
- Ukraine – Dmytro Kuleba (2020–present)
- United Kingdom -
  1. Dominic Raab (2019–2021)
  2. Liz Truss (2021–present)
  - Scotland –
    1. Michael Russell (2020-2021)
    2. Angus Robertson (2021–present)
- Vatican City – Archbishop Paul Gallagher (2014–present)

== North America and the Caribbean ==
- Antigua and Barbuda – E.P. Chet Greene (2018–present)
- The Bahamas –
  1. Darren Henfield (2017–2021)
  2. Fred Mitchell (2021–present)
- Barbados – Jerome Walcott (2018–present)
- Belize – Eamon Courtenay (2020–present)
- Canada –
  1. François-Philippe Champagne (2019–2021)
  2. Marc Garneau (2021)
  3. Mélanie Joly (2021–present)
  - Quebec – Nadine Girault (2018–present)
- Costa Rica – Rodolfo Solano (2020–present)
- Cuba – Bruno Rodríguez Parrilla (2009–present)
- Dominica – Kenneth Darroux (2019–present)
- Dominican Republic – Roberto Álvarez (2020–present)
- El Salvador – Alexandra Hill Tinoco (2019–present)
- Greenland –
  1. Steen Lynge (2020–2021)
  2. Kim Kielsen (2021)
  3. Pele Broberg (2021)
  4. Múte Bourup Egede (2021–present)
- Grenada – Oliver Joseph (2020–present)
- Guatemala – Pedro Brolo (2020–2022)
- Haiti –
  1. Claude Joseph (2020–2021)
  2. Jean Victor Généus (2021–present)
- Honduras – Lisandro Rosales (2019–2022)
- Jamaica – Kamina Johnson-Smith (2016–present)
- Mexico – Marcelo Ebrard (2018–present)
- Nicaragua – Denis Moncada (2017–present)
- Panama – Erika Mouynes (2020–present)
- Puerto Rico –
  1. Raúl Márquez Hernández (2020–2021)
  2. Larry Seilhamer Rodríguez (2021)
  3. Félix Rivera Torres (acting) (2021)
  4. Omar Marrero Díaz (2021–present)
- Saint Kitts and Nevis – Mark Brantley (2015–present)
- Saint Lucia –
  1. Allen Chastanet (2016–2021)
  2. Alva Baptiste (2021–present)
- Saint Vincent and the Grenadines – Ralph Gonsalves (2020–present)
- Trinidad and Tobago – Amery Browne (2020–present)
- United States –
  1. Mike Pompeo (2018–2021)
  2. Daniel Smith (acting) (2021)
  3. Antony Blinken (2021–2025)

== Oceania ==
- Australia – Marise Payne (2018–present)
- Cook Islands – Mark Brown (2013–present)
- Fiji – Frank Bainimarama (2020–present)
- French Polynesia – Édouard Fritch (2014–present)
- Kiribati – Taneti Mamau (2016–present)
- Marshall Islands – Casten Nemra (2020–present)
- Micronesia – Kandhi A. Elieisar (2019–present)
- Nauru – Lionel Aingimea (2019–present)
- New Zealand – Nanaia Mahuta (2020–present)
- Niue – Dalton Tagelagi (2020–present)
- Palau –
  1. Faustina Rehuher-Marugg (2017–2021)
  2. Uduch Sengebau Senior (2021)
  3. Gustav Aitaro (2021–present)
- Papua New Guinea – Soroi Eoe (2020–2022)
- Samoa –
  1. Tuilaʻepa Saʻilele Malielegaoi (1998–2021)
  2. Fiamē Naomi Mataʻafa (2021–present)
- Solomon Islands – Jeremiah Manele (2019–present)
- Tokelau –
  1. Esera Fofō Tuisano (2020–2021)
  2. Kelihiano Kalolo (2021–present)
- Tonga –
  1. Pohiva Tu'i'onetoa (2019–2021)
  2. Fekitamoeloa ʻUtoikamanu (2021–present)
- Tuvalu – Simon Kofe (2019–2023)
- Vanuatu – Mark Ati (2020–present)

== South America ==
- Argentina –
  1. Felipe Solá (2019–2021)
  2. Santiago Cafiero (2021–present)
- Bolivia – Rogelio Mayta (2020–present)
- Brazil –
  1. Ernesto Araújo (2019–2021)
  2. Carlos Alberto França (2021–present)
- Chile - Andrés Allamand (2020–2022)
- Colombia –
  1. Claudia Blum (2019–2021)
  2. Adriana Mejía (acting) (2021)
  3. Marta Lucía Ramírez (2021–2022)
- Ecuador –
  1. Luis Gallegos (2020–2021)
  2. Manuel Mejía Dalmau (2021)
  3. Mauricio Montalvo Samaniego (2021–2022)
- Guyana – Hugh Todd (2020–present)
- Paraguay –
  1. Federico González Franco (2020–2021)
  2. Euclides Acevedo (2021–present)
- Peru –
  1. Elizabeth Astete (2020–2021)
  2. Allan Wagner Tizón (2021)
  3. Héctor Béjar (2021)
  4. Óscar Maúrtua (2021–2022)
- Suriname – Albert Ramdin (2020–present)
- Uruguay – Francisco Bustillo (2020–present)
- Venezuela –
  1. Jorge Arreaza (2017–2021)
  2. Félix Plasencia (2021–present)

== See also ==
- List of current foreign ministers
