= Simon Harel =

Canadian intellectual (born 1957)

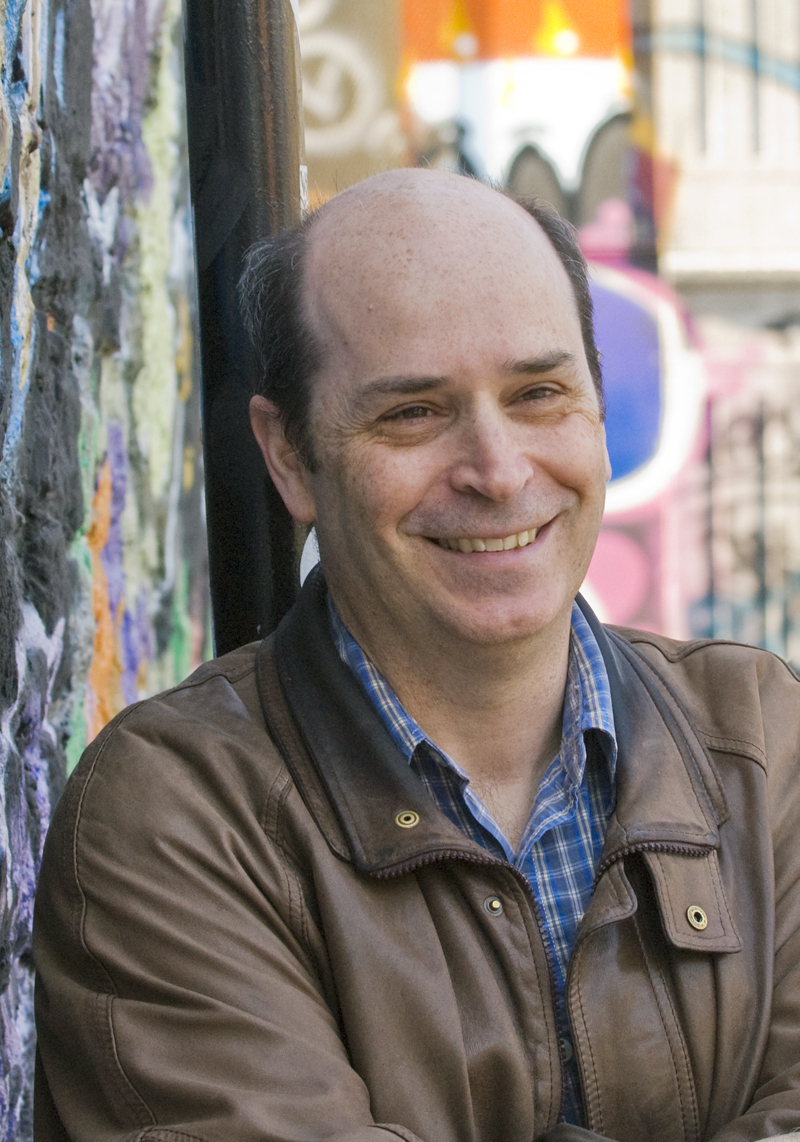
- Simon Harel, Canadian intellectual and professor.
- Born: Montreal, Canada
- Education: master’s from UQAM, a Ph.D. in literature from Université Paris VII, and completed post-doctoral work in sociology at UQAM
- Occupations: Canadian professor & author specializing in self-narratives, autobiography, and intercultural literature

Simon Harel is a Canadian intellectual. In addition to being a writer, speaker and an adjunct professor at the Département d'études littéraires of the Université du Québec à Montréal, he is a professor at the Département de littérature et langues du monde of the University of Montreal, where he is known as a specialist on self-narratives, biographies and autobiographies.

== Academic and professional biography ==
At the end of the 1970s, Simon Harel pursued graduate studies at the Université du Québec à Montréal (UQAM). While working with such professors as Madeleine Gagnon, he developed an interest in psychoanalysis, particularly in the works of Catherine Clément, Jacques Lacan and René Major.

In 1981, after his M.A., Simon Harel moved to France with the purpose of working on his PhD at the Department of Psychoanalysis at the University of Paris VIII. However, he arrived in Vincennes a few months after the dissolution of the École Freudienne de Paris. Harel then obtained a Diplôme d'études approfondies at the Unité d'enseignement et de recherche de littérature française et comparée at the University Paris VII Diderot before undertaking, under the supervision of Julia Kristeva, a PhD in Humanities. His doctoral dissertation, completed in 1986, is entitled "L'écriture de la psychose dans les textes de Rodez d'Antonin Artaud". The interest that Harel has for psychoanalysis deepened during his academic studies. Although he knew the works of the French psychoanalysts (Jacques Lacan, Serge Leclaire, and René Major), he was interested in English psychoanalysis, particularly in the reading that the French thinkers and writers did of the theories of Melanie Klein, Wilfred Bion, and Donald Winnicott.

From 1986 to 1988, Harel completed, under the supervision of Régine Robin, a post-doctoral degree at the Department of Sociology, UQAM. He then became an independent researcher, funded by FCAR from 1988 to 1989, when he was made an adjunct professor at UQAM. In 1993, he was promoted to assistant professor. In 1997 he was promoted to a tenured position. In 2001, Harel co-founded, with Pierre Ouellet, the Montréal site of the Centre interuniversitaire d'études sur les lettres, les arts et les traditions (ELAT). He was its director from 2001 to 2007, and its interim director from September 2008 to August 2009.

During his career, Harel has been the head of many research networks and scientific projects funded by various organizations. He was also the principal investigator of the project Modalités du lien de confiance/Conditions of the Bonds of Confidence (2006–2008). Harel is Director of the research project Zones de tension: expressions de la conflictualité dans la littérature québécoise et canadienne 1981–2006/Zones of Tension: Expressions of Conflict in Canadian and Québécois Literatures 1981–2006 (2007–2011).

Harel has overseen 11 collaborative works and 7 special issues of periodicals. He has published a collection of poems, 10 critical works, and more than 120 articles. Harel has given more than 250 talks and conferences, and has organized approximately 25 conferences and major scientific events.

Harel was awarded a prestigious Trudeau Fellowship Prize (2009–2012) and was named in 2009 a member of the Royal Society of Canada.

== Fields of expertise ==
Harel has been a pioneer in the field of literary studies and cultural studies. He was one of the first scholars to describe the singularity of the migratory experience in Québec, which occurs to a great extent in a minority context. He has been interested in the study of interculturalism, the stranger's place in society, and the precariousness of our life spaces.

Among Harel's fields of expertise are the following: contemporary forms of narratives (autobiography and autofiction), multiculturalism and interculturalism, contemporary Quebec literature, Québec literature of cultural communities, contemporary French literature, links between psychoanalysis and culture, cultural studies, narrative studies, intersections of psychic and geographical spaces, dialogues between architecture and literature and anger in literature.

== Prizes and distinctions ==
- 2009 – Member of the Royal Society of Canada
- 2009 – Recipient of a Trudeau Fellowship Prize (2009–2012)
- 2006 – Recipient, as director of CELAT, of the ACCA Nelson Mandela Prize for diversity and inclusion offered by the Association des communautés culturelles et des artistes (ACCA) during Black History Month
- 2006 – Finalist for the Victor-Barbeau Prize from the Académie des lettres du Québec for Les Passages obligés de l'écriture migrante
- 2006 – Finalist for the Spirale Eva-Le-Grand Prize for Braconnages identitaires. Un Québec palimpseste
- 2004 – Listed in Canadian Who's Who
- 2002 – Finalist for the Victor-Barbeau Prize from the Académie des Lettres du Québec for Un boîtier d'écriture. Les lieux dits de Michel Leiris
- 1993 – Prize of the Conseil des Arts de la Communauté urbaine de Montréal (Category Literature) for Antonin Artaud (Vice Versa: "Artaud", 1993:42)
- 1992 – Gabrielle-Roy Prize for Montréal imaginaire. Ville et Littérature, edited by Pierre Nepveu and Gilles Marcotte, Montréal: Fides, 1992, 424 p.

== Bibliography ==
=== Critical works ===
- La rage de Naipaul. Essai-dictée, Montréal, Éditions Nota bene, 2014, 256 p.
- Méditations urbaines autour de la place Émilie-Gamelin, Sainte-Foy, Presses de l’Université Laval, coll. «InterCultures», 2013, 180 p.
- Habiter le défaut des langues. L’analyste, l’analysé, l’écrivain: Wilfred R. Bion, Montréal, XYZ Éditeur, coll. «Théorie et littérature», 2012, 276 p.
- Attention écrivains méchants, Sainte-Foy, Presses de l’Université Laval, coll. «InterCultures», 2010, 181 p.
- Espaces en perdition. Humanités jetables, tome II, Québec: Les Presses de l’Université Laval, (InterCultures), 2008, 289 p.
- Espaces en perdition. Les lieux précaires de la vie quotidienne, tome I, Québec: Les Presses de l’Université Laval (InterCultures), 2007, 222 p.
- Braconnages identitaires. Un Québec palimpseste, Montréal: VLB Éditeur (Le soi et l’autre), 2006, 136 p.
- Les passages obligés de l’écriture migrante, Montréal: XYZ (Théorie et littérature), 2005, 252 p.
- Un boîtier d’écriture. Les lieux dits de Michel Leiris, Montréal: Trait d’union (Spirale), 2002, 146 p.
- La démesure de la voix. Parole et récit en psychanalyse, Montréal: Liber, 2001, 245 p.
- Le voleur de parcours. Identité et cosmopolitisme dans la littérature québécoise contemporaine (1989), Montréal: XYZ, 1999, 334 p.
- Le récit de soi, Montréal: XYZ (Théorie et littérature), 1997, 250 p.
- L’écriture réparatrice. Le défaut autobiographique : Leiris, Crevel, Artaud, Montréal: XYZ (Théorie et littérature), 1994, 231 p.
- Vies et morts d’Antonin Artaud : le séjour à Rodez, Longueuil, Québec: Éditions du Préambule (L’Univers des discours), 1990, 343 p.

=== Fiction ===
- Le Regard long, poems illustrated by Alain Médam, Montréal: Liber, 2002, 135 p.
