= Weddings in Mali =

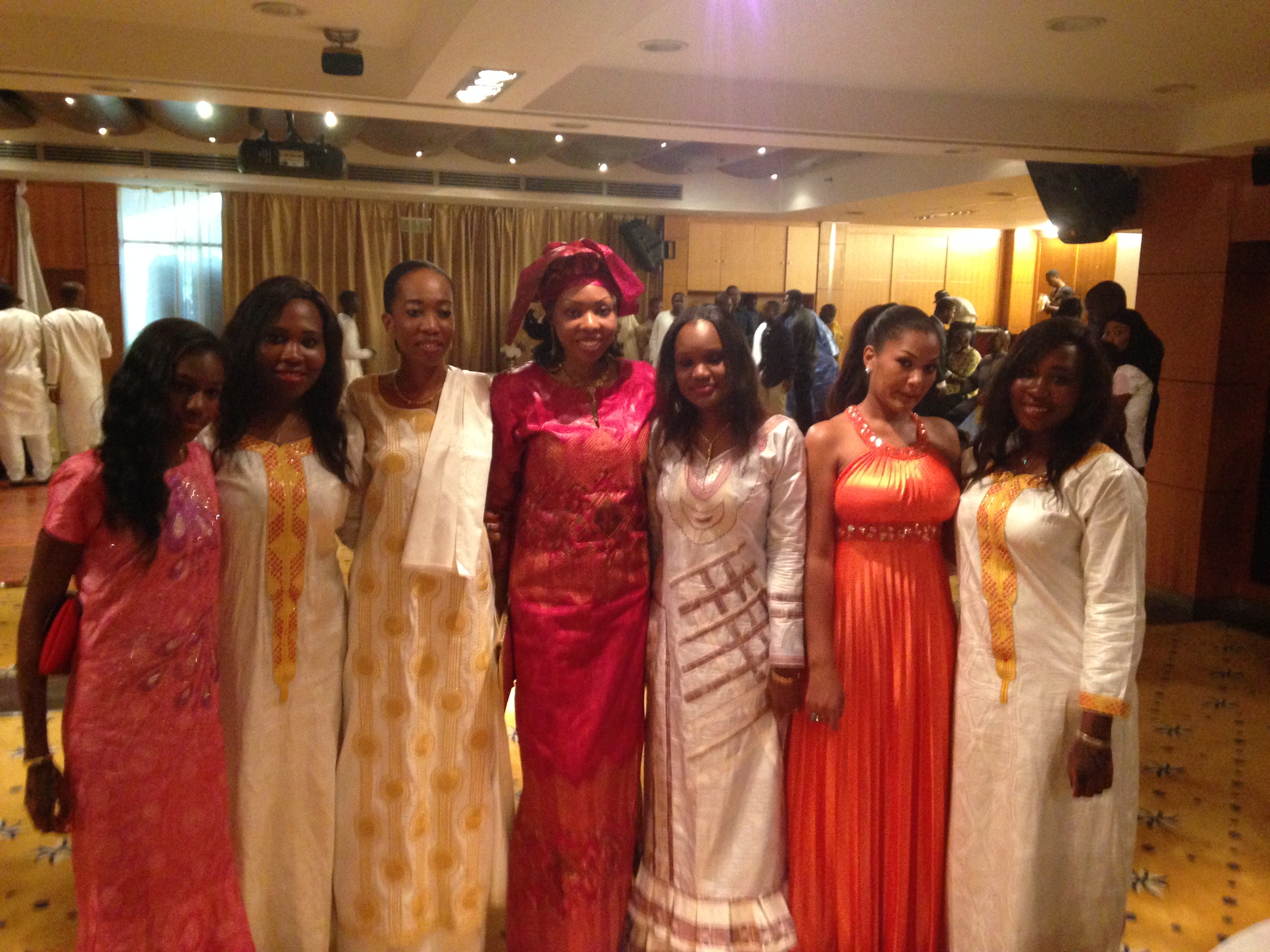
A wedding in Mali

Weddings in Mali involve various important customs and celebrations spread out through a number of days. Usually, the groom and the bride do not personally know the attendees that come to the wedding festivity, because Malian families tend to be very big due to polygamy. Thus weddings are a perfect occasion for all the extended family members of the couple to come for the big day. During this time food is given, and family from the village come to say goodbye to the bride-to-be and celebrate with the family.

== Pre-wedding henna ==
Before the actual wedding takes place there is a pre-wedding henna ceremony only for women. Where local henna designers apply henna for the bride, and the other women present at the ceremony.

== The three forms of marriage in Mali ==
=== Religious marriage ===
- This form of marriage is very common for the religion, Islam, usually taking place in a mosque. In Islamic weddings both the groom and bride have to give their consent to get wedded to each other willingly. Before the wedding ceremony cola nuts are distributed amongst the women's families to symbolize the engagement of the couple and to inform their family members of the initial engagement. During this ceremony both the men and women remain separate from each other, while an imam officiates the marriage. Since about 90 percent of Malians are Muslim, this religious marriage is considered the most important form.

=== Civil marriage ===
- Civil marriage is the non-religious, legal wedding ceremony that generally takes place at the courthouse with the presence of a legal official (judge, magistrate, mayor).

=== Traditional marriage ===
- Traditional marriage varies greatly from region to region and differs greatly between different ethnic groups. Traditional weddings usually last for a couple of days, and are typically led by an imam. Traditional marriages are a way to celebrate the newlyweds and a way for families to express their joys of the day.
- Throughout the wedding festivities the newlywed's family and guests, sing, dance, and play traditional music outdoors until late at night. This celebration usually takes place in front of the family house of the groom and the bride. Where everyone sits in a circle under a tent while being entertained by the Djembefola and Djeli (Traditional artists) who sing and praise the families in their ethnic languages.

== Malian wedding attire ==
=== Attire ===
The main wedding attire in Mali is called bazin, (sometimes referred to as boubou for men). This fabric is hand dyed polished cotton, which is popularly characterized by its shine. There are two types of bazin/boubou: rich and basic, which are formal and informal. The bazin/boubou rich is the most expensive fabric that is usually reserved for greater occasions which are typically worn formally. While the basic bazin/boubou is worn every day on a more informal basis. The bazin/boubou is worn on many different occasions such as during the two main Islamic celebrations Eid, in funerals, weddings, and on Friday prayers to the mosque. It is well known for its decorative fundamental embroidery that stands out for its elegant designs. They generally come in many different designs, which are embroidered by a tailor using either a pedal-driven or electric sewing machine.

The bazin/boubous are sewed differently for men and women. Whereas the men boubou consists of three different pieces of clothing that are the same color. A tie-up trouser, a long sleeve chemise, and a wide open-embroidered sleeveless gown that is worn over everything. While for women even though their bazin is sewn in a three piece, it comes with a wrapper that is typically tied around the waist, a blouse, and a headscarf.

The bride is expected to wear the best quality of bazin rich designed just for her for the traditional and religious wedding, and for the civil wedding, she dresses in a modern white gown. While the groom dresses in white boubou for the traditional and religious wedding and wears a suit for the civil wedding.

Attendees may also wear gold jewelry with their bazin rich attire. In West Africa, gold is symbolically connected to the preservation and sacredness of the earth.
