= Minister of Foreign Affairs (Guinea) =

Minister of Foreign Affairs of the Republic of Guinea is a government minister in charge of the Ministry of Foreign Affairs of Guinea, responsible for conducting foreign relations of the country.

The following is a list of foreign ministers of Guinea since its founding in 1958:

No.	Name (Birth–Death)	Portrait	Tenure
1	Ahmed Sékou Touré (1922–1984)		1958–1961
2	Louis Lansana Beavogui (1923–1984)		1961–1969
3	Saifoulaye Diallo (1923–1981)		1969–1972
4	Fily Cissoko (b. 1927)		1972–1979
5	Abdoulaye Touré (c. 1920–1985)		1979–1984
6	Facinet Touré (1934–2021)		1984–1985
7	Jean Traoré (1938–1999)		1985–1992
8	Ibrahima Sylla (b. 1943)		1992–1994
9	Kozo Zoumanigui (b. 1945)		1994–1996
10	Lamine Camara		1996–1999
11	Zainoul Abidine Sanoussi (1942?–2001)		1999–2000
12	Mahawa Bangoura (b. 1927)		2000–2002
13	François Lonseny Fall (b. 1949)		2002–2004
14	Mamady Condé (b. 1952)		2004–2005
15	Fatoumata Kaba (b. 1959?)		2005–2006
(14)	Mamady Condé (b. 1952)		2006–2007
16	Kabèlè Abdoul Camara (b. 1950)		2007–2008
17	Amadou Lamarana Bah		2008–2009
18	Alexandre Cécé Loua (b. 1956)		2009–2010
19	Bakary Fofana (b. 1950)		2010
20	Édouard Niankoye Lamah (1945/1946–2025)		2010–2012
(13)	François Lonseny Fall (b. 1949)		2012–2016
21	Makalé Camara (b. 1956)		2016–2017
22	Mamadi Touré (b. 1952)		2017–2021
23	Ibrahima Khalil Kaba (b. 1970)		2021
24	Morissanda Kouyaté (b. 1951)		2021–present
