= Mamady Condé =

Guinean politician and diplomat

Mamady Condé is a Guinean politician and diplomat. Condé was first appointed to the post of Minister of Foreign Affairs in March 2004. Being replaced by Fatoumata Kaba on March 8, 2005, Condé was appointed once again as foreign minister in 2006, retaining the post until March 2007.

Political offices
Preceded by François Lonseny Fall	Foreign Minister of Guinea; 2004–2005	Succeeded by Fatoumata Kaba
Preceded by Fatoumata Kaba	Foreign Minister of Guinea; 2006–2007	Succeeded by Kabèlè Abdoul Camara
