= Maciré Sylla =

- Born: Maciré Sylla; Conakry, Guinea
- Genres: Afropop, world, world fusion, worldbeat,
- Occupation(s): Singer-songwriter, dancer
- Years active: 1996–present
- Labels: Djembé Faré
- Website: www.maciresylla.com

Maciré Sylla is a Guinean singer-songwriter and dancer. She was born in Conakry but raised in Tayiré, a village to the north of Conakry.

Sylla sings mainly in Soussou and her style is inspired by Mandingo, Afropop, and Funk music. She has released five albums to date. She sold 200,000 copies of her first LP "Mariama" in Guinea, which made her the "best Guinean female singer of year 1998." Her song "Perenperen" from the album "Massa" was included in the 2008 compilation album "African Party" from New Orleans label Putumayo World Music.

== Discography ==
- Mariama (1996, Djembé Faré/Misslin)
- Maya Irafama (2001, Djembé Faré/Trace)
- Sarefi (2004, Ethnomad/Arion)
- Massa (2005, Djembé Faré/Nocturne)
- Talitha (2010, Djembé Faré/Disques Office)
