= Makalé Camara =

Guinean lawyer, diplomat and politician

Minister of Foreign Affairs of Guinea
- In office 4 January 2016 – 2017
- Preceded by: François Lonseny Fall
- Succeeded by: Mamadi Touré

Personal details
- Born: 1956 (age 69–70) Mamou, Guinea
- Education: Gamal Abdel Nasser University of Conakry
- Occupation: Lawyer, diplomat, politician
- Awards: Guinean National Order of Merit (2008)

Hadja Makalé Camara (born 1956) is a Guinean lawyer, diplomat and politician who has served as Minister of Foreign Affairs of Guinea from 4 January 2016 to 2017.

== Early life and education ==
Camara was born in Mamou in 1956. She graduated from the Gamal Abdel Nasser University of Conakry with a master's degree in Labour law in 1980. She was a Humphrey Fellow.

== Career ==
Camara worked in various public service roles from 1980 to 1985. In 1986, she was appointed Inspector General at the Ministry of the Civil Service, responsible for labor law and arbitration between trade unions and employers. From 1991 to 2002, she was a member of the Transitional National Recovery Committee.

Camara was appointed to cabinet when Guinea was under military rule, in 1992 as Secretary of State for Social Affairs, Women's Promotion and Childhood, then in 1994 as Minister of Agriculture, Livestock and Forestry. From 1997 to 2000 she chaired the Board of Directors of the National Office for Employment and Manpower, and during the war in Liberia and Sierra Leone she was Secretary General of Réseau des Femmes Africaines Ministres et Parlementaires (REFAMP) in Guinea.

Camara was appointed Guinea's Ambassador to Senegal, The Gambia, Cape Verde and Mauritania in 2002, serving a five-year term. In 2007, she was appointed Ambassador to France, Spain, Portugal and Monaco and was Guinea's representative to UNESCO, Organisation internationale de la Francophonie and IBE. She served as REFAMP Secretary General from 2012 to 2015 and spoke out for gender equality.

Camara was appointed Minister of Foreign Affairs in the government of Alpha Condé on 4 January 2016. She is a member of the national steering committee for the "Fight against Genital Mutilation".

== Awards and honours ==
Camara was made a member of the National Order of Merit in July 2008.
