= Fatoumata Kaba (politician) =

Guinean politician

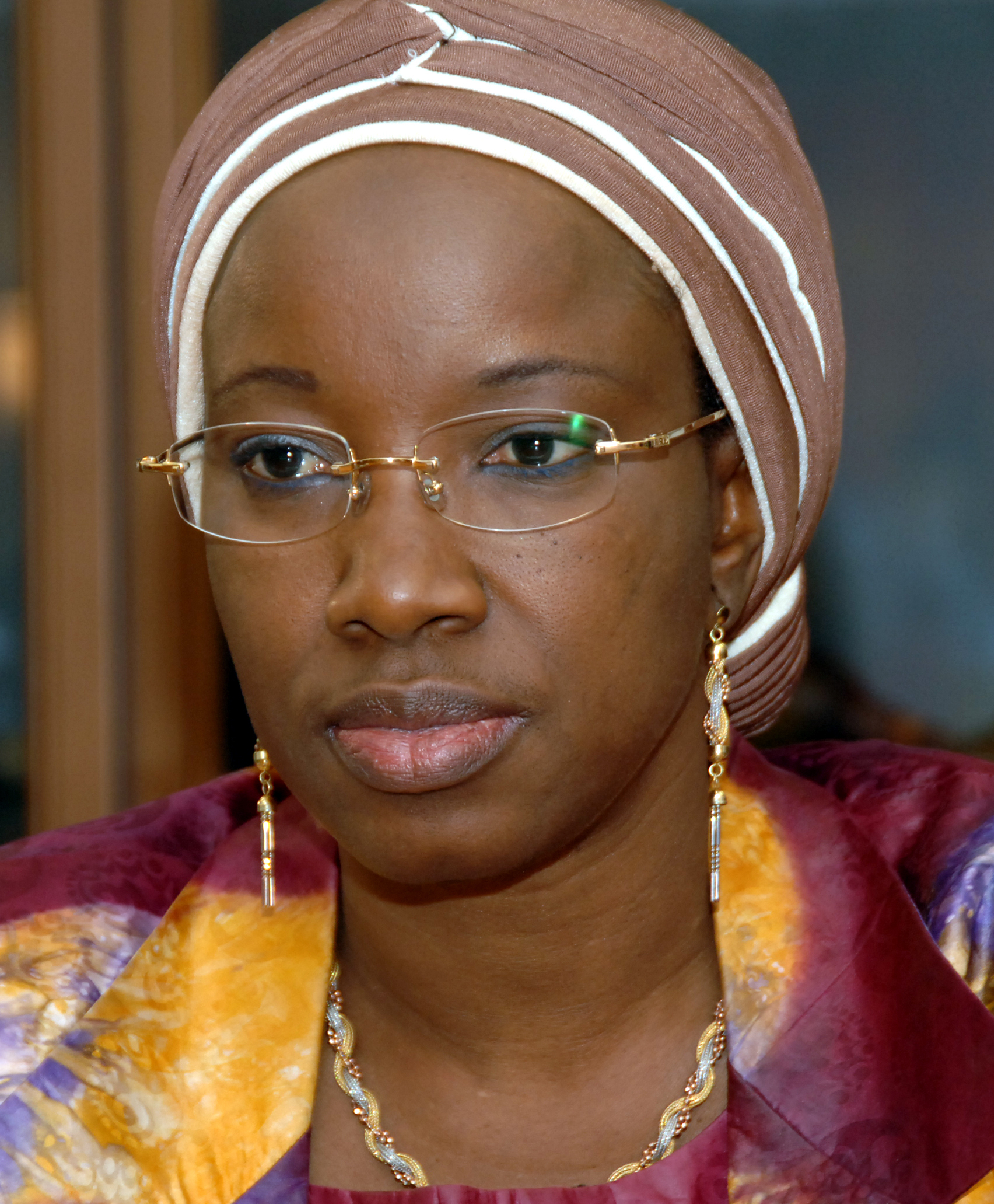
- Kaba in 2006

Minister of Foreign Affairs
- In office 8 March 2005 – 6 September 2006
- Preceded by: Mamady Condé
- Succeeded by: Mamady Condé

Sidibé Fatoumata Kaba is a Guinean politician and diplomat. She was Minister of Foreign Affairs in the West African state of Guinea from 2005 to 2006.

In December 2022, the transitional president Mamadi Doumbouya appointed her ambassador to the United States. She was previously ambassador to the United Nations

== See also ==
- List of female foreign ministers
