= François Lonseny Fall =

Guinean diplomat and politician

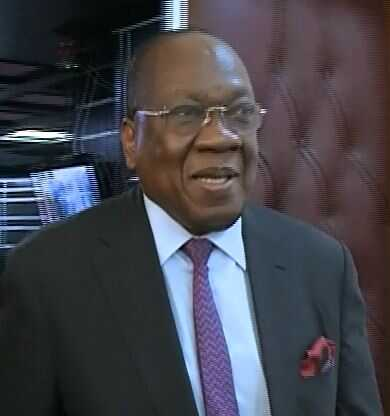
François Lonseny Fall

François Lonseny Fall (born April 21, 1949) is a Guinean diplomat and politician. He briefly served as Prime Minister of Guinea from February 23, 2004, to July 15, 2004, under authoritarian President Lansana Conté. Later, under democratically elected president Alpha Condé, he was Secretary-General of the Presidency from December 2010 to October 2012 and Minister of State for Foreign Affairs from October 2012 to January 2016.

== Early life and career ==
Fall received a master's degree in law from the University of Conakry in 1976 and was Assistant Professor in the Faculty of Law at the same university from 1977 to 1979.

== Career in diplomacy ==
In 1979, Fall began a diplomatic career, holding diplomatic posts in Paris, New York City, Lagos, Cairo, and Conakry from 1982 to 1990; he was Director of the Department of Legal and Consular Affairs at the Guinean Ministry of Foreign Affairs from 1996 to 2000.

Fall was Guinea's Permanent Representative to the United Nations from 2000 to 2002. In 2000, he was Vice-President of the Fifty-Fifth Session of the United Nations General Assembly. From 2000 to 2002, he was a member of the United Nations Committee for the Elimination of Racial Discrimination. He was then appointed Minister of Foreign Affairs on June 10, 2002. As foreign minister, he was Guinea's delegate to the United Nations Security Council during the debate over the United States military action in Iraq, and he acted as President of the United Nations Security Council in March 2003. He was also a member of the Economic Community of West African States (ECOWAS) Ministerial Committee for Security and Mediation from 2002 to 2004.

Fall was appointed prime minister on February 23, 2004. After only two months, Fall resigned as prime minister on April 30, saying that President Lansana Conté would not let him attempt to fix the economy. He was not replaced as prime minister until December 2004, and until July 2004, there was some dispute as to whether he had actually left office formally.

In May 2005, United Nations Secretary-General Kofi Annan appointed Fall to be his Special Representative for Somalia. In that capacity, Fall also assumed charge of the UN's Political Office for Somalia (UNPOS), located in Nairobi, Kenya. From the date of his appointment through mid-2005, Fall's principal task was to persuade and assist rival Somali warlords to lay down their weapons, resolve their differences, and restore national government to a country that had not had one since 1992. On February 21, 2017, he was appointed Special Representative for Central Africa and Head of the United Nations Regional Office for Central Africa (UNOCA) by Secretary-General António Guterres, after serving in that capacity as Acting Special Representative since November 2016.

Lonseny Fall was a minor candidate in the first round of the 2010 presidential election. He then supported Alpha Condé in the second round. Condé won in the second round; shortly after he was sworn in as president, he appointed Lonseny Fall as Secretary-General of the Presidency on December 23, 2010. Lonseny Fall served in that post for nearly two years; he was then appointed to the government as Minister of State for Foreign Affairs and Guineans Abroad on October 5, 2012.

Fall was dismissed from the government in early 2016, but he remained involved in regional diplomacy through other roles. Beginning in January 2016, Fall served as Vice-Chairman of the Joint Monitoring and Evaluation Commission of the South Sudan Peace Agreement (JMEC), under the leadership of Chairman Festus Mogae. On October 14, 2016, United Nations Secretary-General Ban Ki-moon appointed him as his Acting Special Representative for Central Africa and Head of the United Nations Regional Office for Central Africa (UNOCA); he took up the post on November 1.

In January 2022, François Louncény Fall left his post as United Nations Special Representative for Central Africa.

Political offices
Preceded by Lamine Sidimé	Prime Minister of Guinea; 2004	Succeeded by Cellou Dalein Diallo
Preceded by Mahawa Bangoura	Foreign Minister of Guinea; 2002–2004	Succeeded by Mamady Condé
