= Mamadi Touré =

Guinean politician

Minister of Foreign Affairs
- In office 2017–2021
- Preceded by: Makalé Camara
- Succeeded by: Ibrahima Khalil Kaba

Personal details
- Born: 11 December 1952 (age 73)

Mamadi Touré (born 11 December 1952) is a Guinean politician. He served as Minister of Foreign Affairs from 2017 to 2021. Ibrahima Khalil Kaba was appointed his successor.

Political offices
Preceded by Makalé Camara	Minister of Foreign Affairs; 2017–2021	Succeeded by Ibrahima Khalil Kaba
