= United Nations Nelson Rolihlahla Mandela Prize =

UN Nelson Rolihlahla Mandela Prize
- Awarded for: Dedicated service to humanity, in the promotion of reconciliation and social cohesion, and in community development
- Date: July 20, 2020
- Location: UNHQ, New York
- Presented by: UNSG
- First award: 2015
- Final award: 2025
- Currently held by: Brenda Reynolds and Kennedy Odede
- Website: Official website

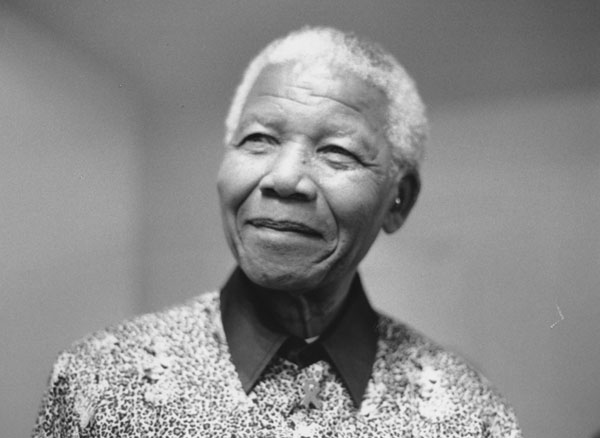
Nelson Mandela, namesake of the award

The United Nations Nelson Rolihlahla Mandela Prize is awarded every five years by the United Nations on Mandela Day to two individuals, one woman and one man from different geographic regions, in recognition of their dedicated service to humanity, in the promotion of reconciliation and social cohesion, and in community development, guided by the purposes and principles of the UN. It was established in 2014 by a UN General Assembly resolution in honour of Nelson Mandela.

== Nominations ==
Written nominations for the prize can be submitted by member states and observer states of the UN, entities and intergovernmental organizations, institutions of higher education, independent research centres and institutes, NGOs and laureates of the prize.

Staff members of any organization of the UN system are not eligible.

== List of laureates ==
- 2015: Helena Ndume (Namibia) and Jorge Sampaio (Portugal)
- 2020: Marianna Vardinogiannis (Greece) and Morissanda Kouyaté (Guinea)
- 2025: Brenda Reynolds (Fishing Lake Saulteaux First Nation, Canada) and Kennedy Odede (Kenya)

== See also ==
- List of awards for contributions to society
- List of humanitarian and service awards
