= Abdoul Kabèlè Camara =

Guinean politician and diplomat

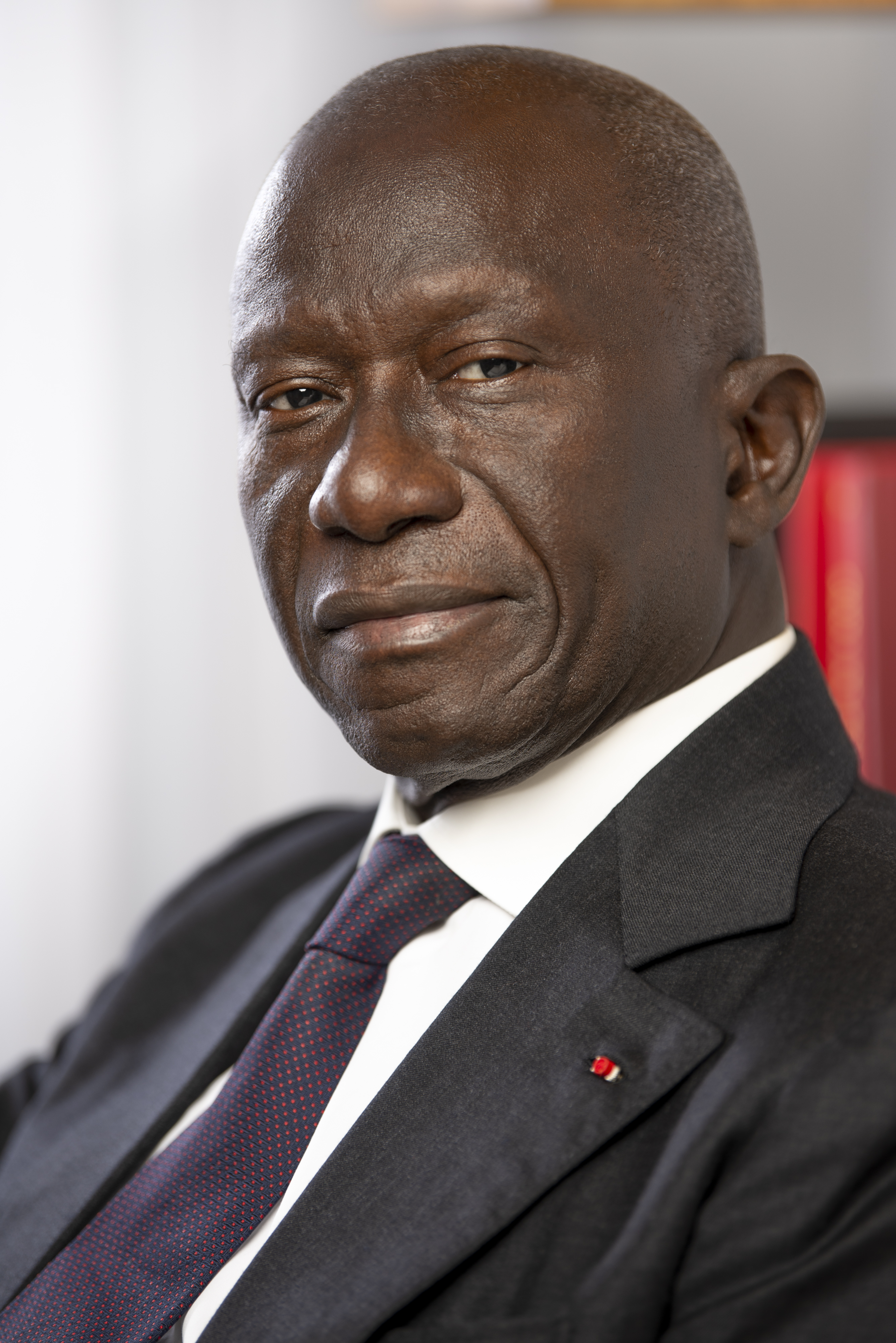
Abdoul Kabèlè Camara

Abdoul Kabèlè Camara (born 12 February 1950) is a Guinean politician and diplomat.

== Legal career ==
Camara obtained a licentiate in legal sciences from Cheikh Anta Diop University, and also graduated from the National School of Administration and Magistracy in Senegal. After working several internships in Montreal in Canada between 1976 and 1977, he joined the Senegalese Magistracy in 1977. He held the positions of:

- Investigating judge at the Saint-Louis court from 1977 to 1979;
- President of the Labor Court of Saint-Louis (First Capital of Senegal) from 1979 to 1983;
- President of the Regional Court of Saint-Louis, from 1983 to 1985;
- Dean of the Senior Investigating Judges at the Dakar Regional Court from 1985 to 1988, responsible for economic and military affairs;
- Advisor to the First Correctional Chamber of the Dakar Court of Appeal.

Camara was also a lecturer at the National School of Administration and the Dakar Magistracy (Judicial Division) from 1988 to 1990.

Camara was sworn in as a lawyer and was registered by the Guinean Bar Association on August 16, 1990, and was president of the Bar from 2002 to 2006. He was also named vice-president of the Association of Bars of West Africa (ABAO) in 2004. During this period, he was a lawyer at the Court of Appeals in Conakry.

== Political career ==
Camara began his political career in 1993, being elected as a Member of the National Assembly. In 1995, he helped President Lansana Conté found the Unity and Progress Party (PUP). In 2002, he resigned from the PUP after opposing the arrest of opposition figure Alpha Condé by the government.

In the government of Prime Minister Lansana Kouyaté, which was named on 28 March 2007, Camara was appointed Minister of Foreign Affairs, Cooperation, African Integration, and Guineans Abroad. He served as Foreign Minister until a new government was appointed on June 19, 2008. He served as a Deputy Minister for Defense from 2010 to 2015 under Alpha Condé, and was Minister of State and Minister responsible for Security and Civil Protection from 2015 to March 2018. He was named the leader of the Guinean Rally for Development party on 17 October 2018.

Preceded by Mamady Condé	Foreign Minister of Guinea; 2007-2008	Succeeded by Amadou Lamara Bah
