= M'Balia Camara =

February 9th was named Guinean Women's Day in honour of her

M'Balia Camara (1929 – February 18, 1955) was a Guinean independence activist. February 9th was named Guinean Women's Day in honour of her.

== Life ==
Born in Posséah in the Dubréka Prefecture, Camara was from a peasant family. Early in life she became active in the Democratic Party of Guinea (DPG) and Rassemblement Démocratique Africain, alongside her husband, Thierno Camara. She also became the leader of the women's section of the DPG. The couple lived in Tondon, where she oversaw the work of the party's local committee of women. Local chief Almamy David Sylla was opposed to the actions of the RDA, and in February 1955 came to the village of Bembaya to collect taxes, after he had already collected taxes. A conflict broke out, and Sylla broke into the Camaras' house; M'Balia was there, heavily pregnant. Sylla attacked her with his sabre, cutting her open. She was taken to a hospital in Conakry, but the baby was stillborn on February 11. M'Balia died one week later.

Camara's death has been described as a galvanizing event in the history of the Guinean independence struggle; one estimate placed the crowd at her funeral at over 10,000 people, rather than the 1,500 claimed by police. Songs were written about her sacrifice, and she was held up as a model for Guinean women to follow in the fight against colonialism. She was such an influential part of her community, February 9th was named Guinean Women's Day in honor of her and her efforts. She is still honored in Guinea for her militant activism. The main market square in Conakry bears her name.
