= Ibrahima Khalil Kaba =

Guinean politician

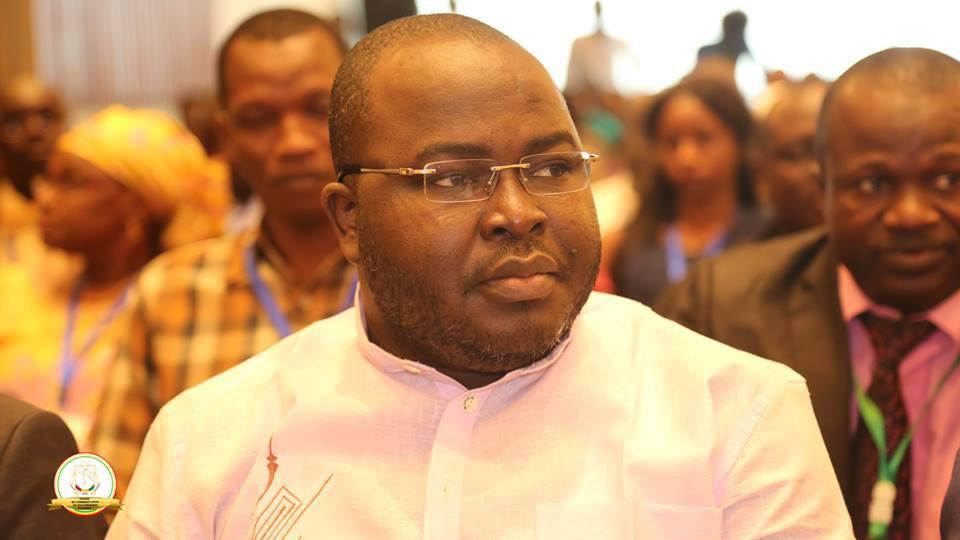

Minister of Foreign Affairs
- In office 29 January 2021 – 5 September 2021
- Preceded by: Mamadi Touré
- Succeeded by: Morissanda Kouyaté

Ibrahima Khalil Kaba is a Guinean politician. He served as the Minister of Foreign Affairs from 29 January 2021 to 5 September 2021.

He was officially appointed on 19 January 2021 to become the next Minister of Foreign Affairs.

In March 2022, Ibrahima Khalil Kaba was arrested and taken to the High Command of the Gendarmerie. His arrest would be linked to the leak of an audio element in which former President Alpha Condé speaks, asking to prepare his party for the regaining power.

Political offices
Preceded by Mamadi Touré	Minister of Foreign Affairs; 2021	Succeeded by Morissanda Kouyaté
