= Morissanda Kouyaté =

Guinean medical doctor

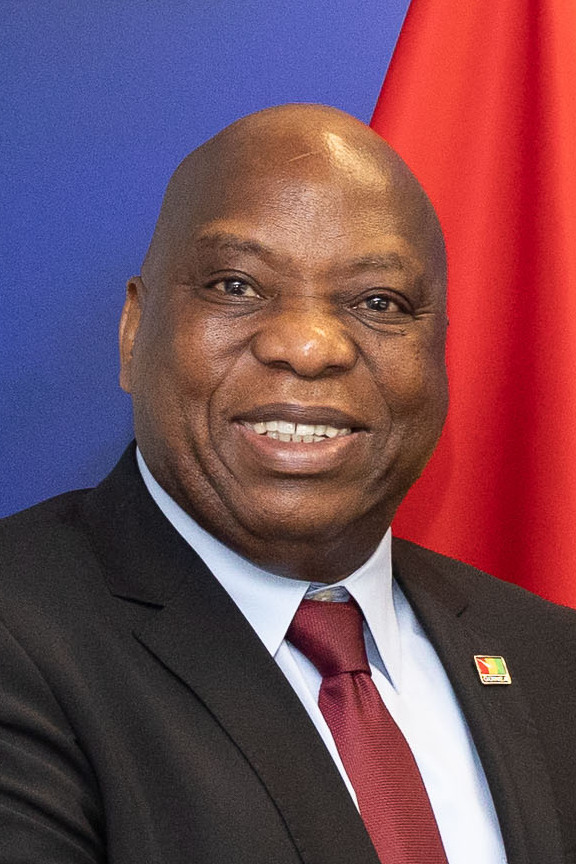
- Kouyaté in 2023

Minister of Foreign Affairs
- Incumbent
- Assumed office 25 October 2021
- Prime Minister: Mohamed Béavogui
- Preceded by: Ibrahima Khalil Kaba

Personal details
- Born: Kouroussa, Guinea
- Occupation: Medical doctor Women's rights activist
- Known for: Campaigning against female genital mutilation
- Portfolio: Adoption of February 6 as international day on Zero Tolerance to FGM; Adoption of United Nations General Assembly Resolution 67/146 banning FGM worldwide

Morissanda Kouyaté, is a Guinean medical doctor and activist against female genital mutilation. After years of activism, he was appointed Minister of Foreign Affairs, International Cooperation, African Integration and Guineans abroad in October, 2021.

== Activism ==
Kouyaté co-founded the Inter-African Committee on Harmful Traditional Practices (IAC) in 1984 in Dakar, Senegal. In 2012, he co-authored the UN General Assembly Resolution 67/146, calling on all countries to end FGM.

== Awards ==
- 2020 United Nations Nelson Rolihlahla Mandela Prize, alongside Greek philanthropist Marianna Vardinogiannis.

Political offices
Preceded by Ibrahima Khalil Kaba	Minister of Foreign Affairs; 2021–present	Incumbent
