= Bazin (fabric) =

Type of fabric

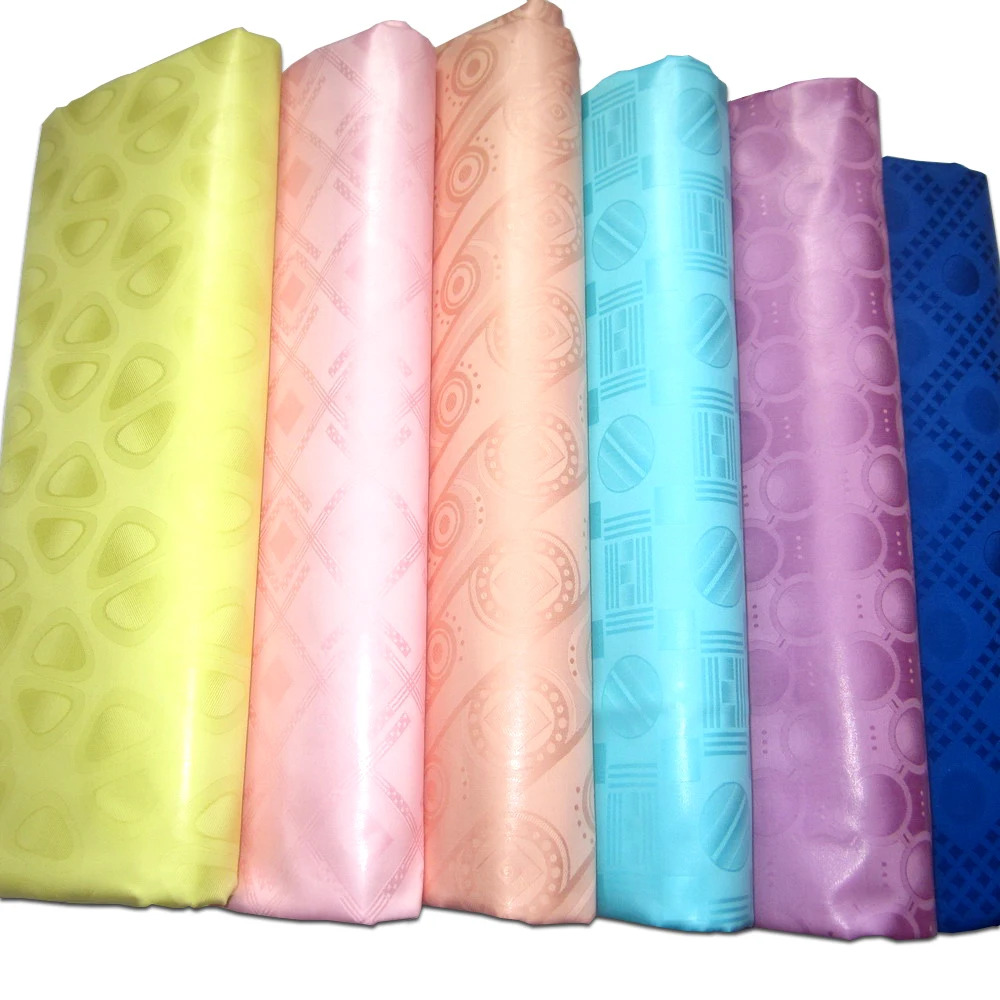
Bazin after manufacturing

Bazin (or basin) is a West African fabric with its origin in Europe, made from hand-dyed cotton, it is imported to African countries from Europe and is then hand-dyed resulting in a damask textile known for its stiffness and vibrant sheen. It is primarily recognized as the most commonly used fabric for crafting a Boubou, a long, loose traditional outerwear worn by both men and women, particularly in West Africa.

== Production ==
The process of crafting Bazin begins with cotton damask fabric. Hand-dyeing, a meticulous and often labor-intensive task undertaken by skilled women, characterizes this traditional artistry. The initial steps involve importing materials, predominantly cotton, and occasionally silk or wool from Germany, the Netherlands, or China. Following material acquisition, the fabric is precisely cut to standard dimensions.

To transform the white damask into vibrant Bazin, an elaborate dyeing process ensues. The fabric undergoes immersion in a dye bath, followed by rinsing and draining. This cycle is repeated until the desired color and intricate patterns emerge. Subsequently, the dyed Bazin undergoes a thorough cold water wash to eliminate any remaining products. The final step, essential for preventing fabric tearing, involves sun-drying.

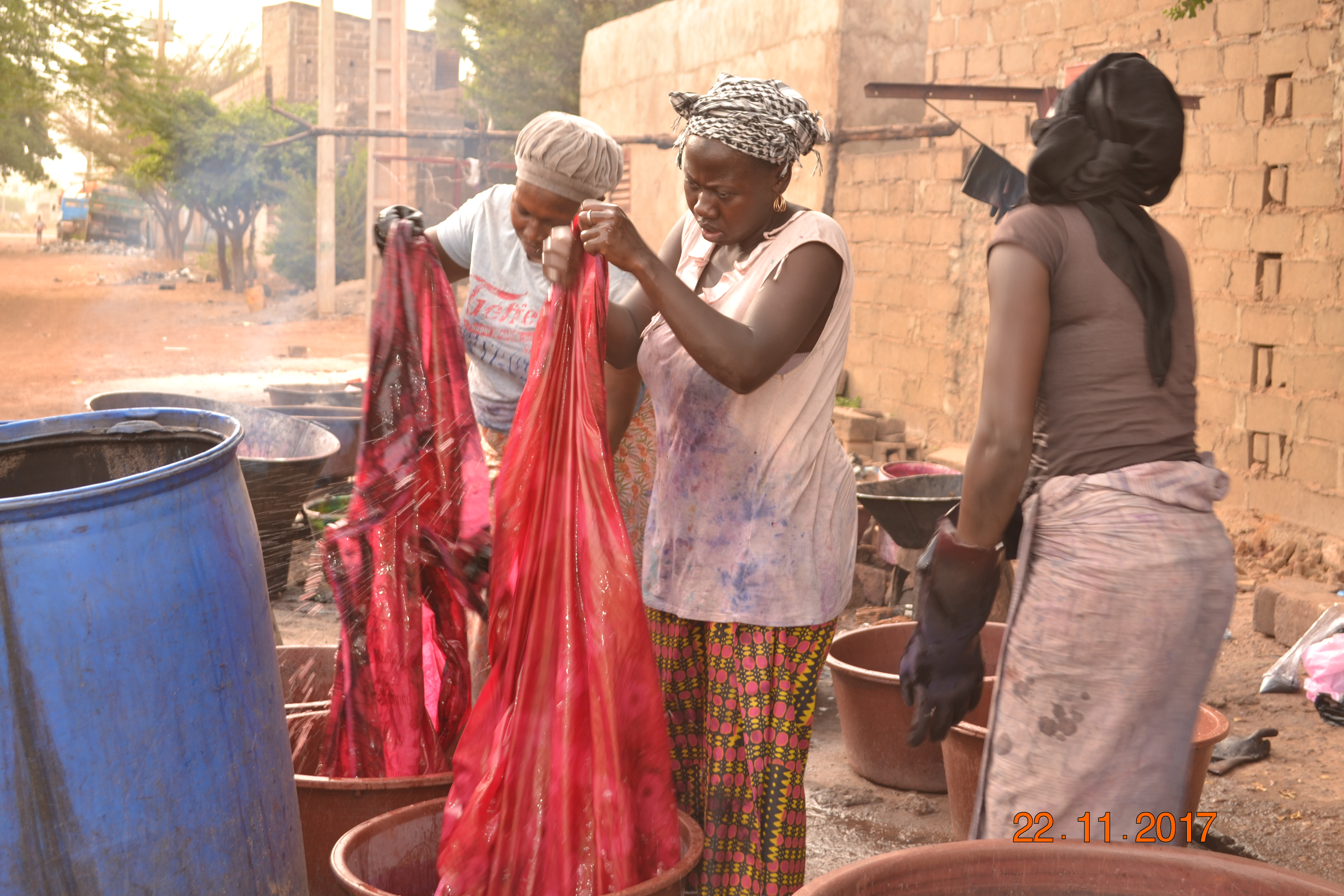
Women dyers in Bamako

Originally, Bazin was dyed with natural indigo, utilizing ash-based potash and clay in a harmless dyeing process. However, since the 1990s, manufacturing processes have evolved with the adoption of chemical dyes, caustic soda, and hydrosulfate. Upon selecting the desired dye, caustic soda and hydrosulfate are dissolved in water. This chemical reaction enhances the resistance of the dye on cotton, marking a modernization of Bazin production techniques while preserving its rich cultural heritage.

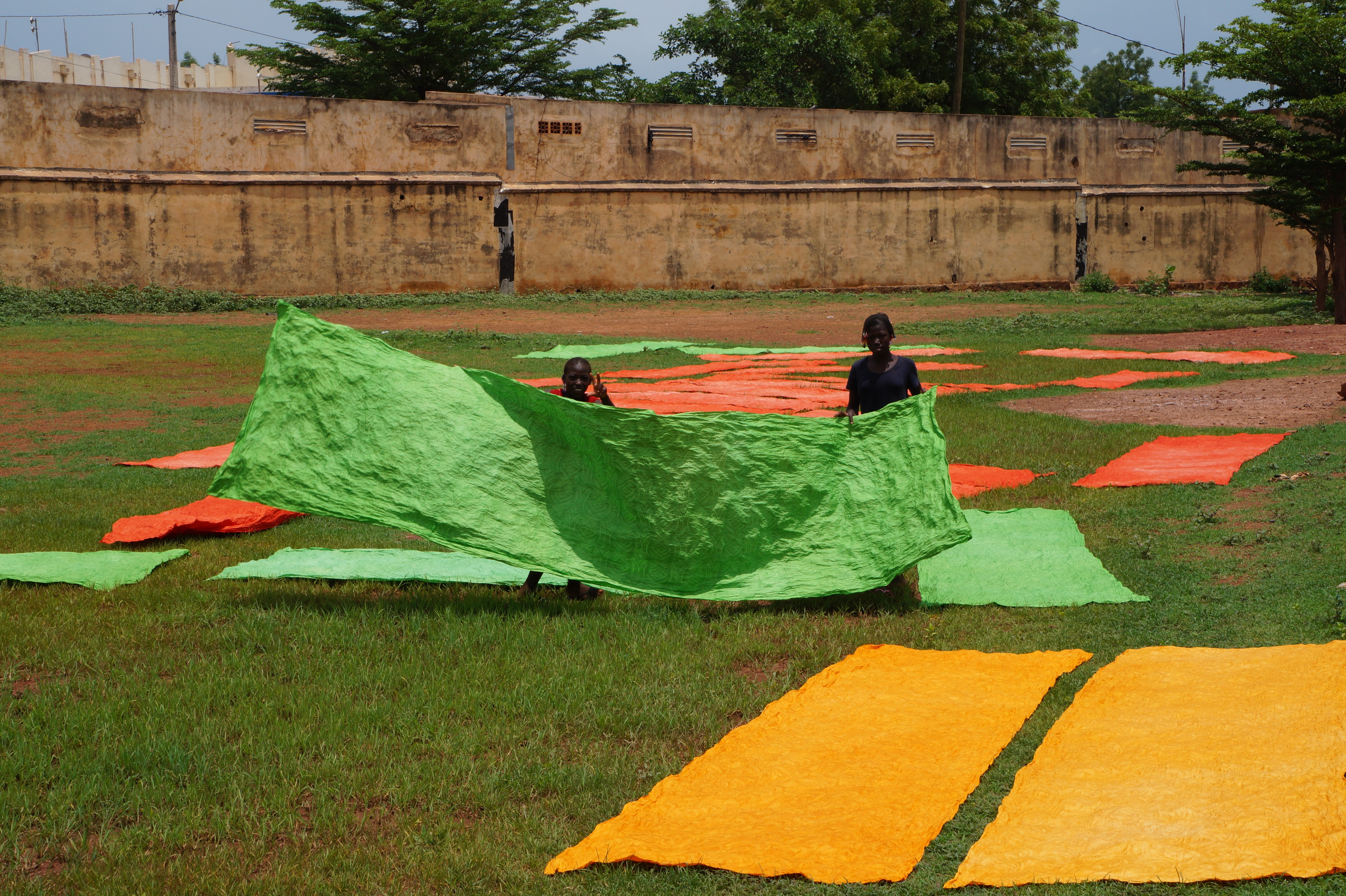
Bazin fabrics being dried on a football field in Mali

== Types ==
Bazin production comprises three distinct types, each offering a unique appeal and varying in affordability:

- Premium Bazin: The premium bazin stands out with its crafting technique, utilizing 100% fine cotton of superior quality. When exposed to dye, it emits an exceptional shine, establishing it as the epitome of quality among the three types.
- Mid-Grade Bazin: The mid-grade bazin is the result of Chinese competition, producing a variant of inferior quality compared to the premium bazin. Despite reduced quality, it presents a more affordable option, costing about half as much as its higher-grade counterpart.
- Budget-Friendly Bazin: The budget-friendly bazin caters to smaller budgets, providing an affordable alternative that costs up to four times less than the premium bazin. This type allows individuals with limited means to access the elegance of bazin.

Distinguishing between these types is often a skill mastered by women and Bazin sellers. However, a hands-on approach, where individuals see and touch the fabric, makes it easy to identify the premium bazin due to its unique texture that sets it apart from the other variants.

== Usage in Senegal ==
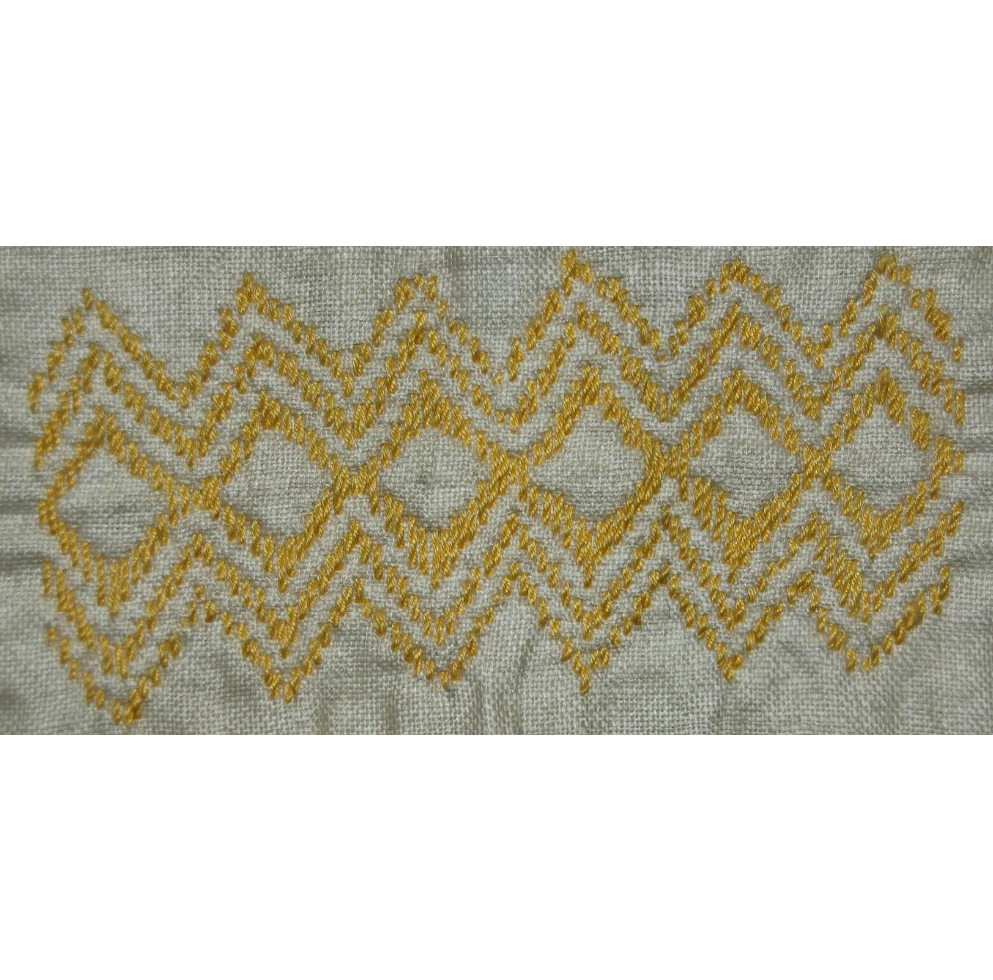
Embroidery technique, Senegal around 1900

Boubou in French meaning a garment that can be slipped on over the head and used generically to describe long, flowing, ankle length robes worn by both men and women across the predominantly Muslim West African Sahel region from Senegal to Northern Nigeria. The traditional boubou is an ample tunic with open sleeves and a triangular or rectangular breast pocket. Boubou both formal and everyday wear is made in all different materials for both men and women. Aside from being comfortable and practical, it provides covering in accordance to Islamic beliefs. Usually, Boubou is constructed in three parts.

In Senegal, the most elegant boubous are made from high-quality cotton damask, the bazin riche. They are heavily embroidered with the same color or contrasting silk thread. Ornate embroidered patterns of circles and swirls adorn the pockets, neck opening, front, back and other parts of the gown depending on the design.

White and light blue are the classic colors and are commonly worn in Mauritania, Western Sahara, Mali and Niger. Bright colors with multicolor embroidery are worn in Senegal and Gambia. Less expensive boubous are made from lower quality cotton damask fabric imported from China or India and usually have no embroidery.

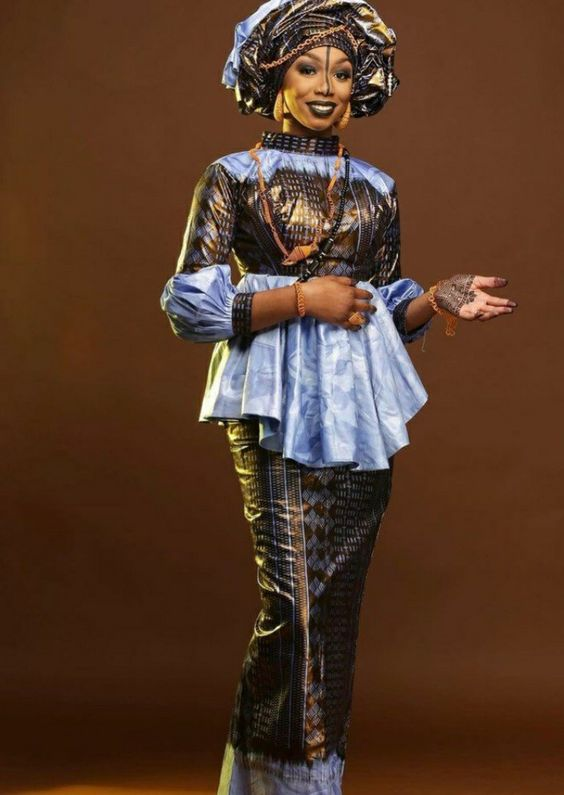
A Senegalese woman in Bazin

Traditionally the Senegalese boubou can be heavily embroidered, it is also known by various names depending on the ethnic group and the region in which it is being worn. In Senegal everyday wear is a caftan, or boubou with pants for the men and pagne a garment that women wrap around their hips and wear under a boubou.[Madison and Hansen, pg 126, 176]

The formal ensemble for men is a three-piece outfit consisting of a caftan, a tchaya (loose trousers), grand boubou and a white embroidered skullcap, pillbox cap, or red or brown fez. In Mauritania and Western Sahara a similar garment is commonly worn with sirwal (Arabic word for loose trousers) in matching damask fabric and hawli (Hassaniya dialect word for a long rectangular piece of cloth that is used as a head wrap or turban). In Niger a similar type of boubou is worn. And Tuareg men commonly wear wrap turbans and face veils. In Mali, traditional clothing made of white mud cloth and associated with the towns of Djenne and Timbuktu was the type of luxury boubou, and the lomasa primarily associated with the Tunka, the ruler of Ngalam, once a Soninke kingdom in present-day Senegal.

=== Technique ===
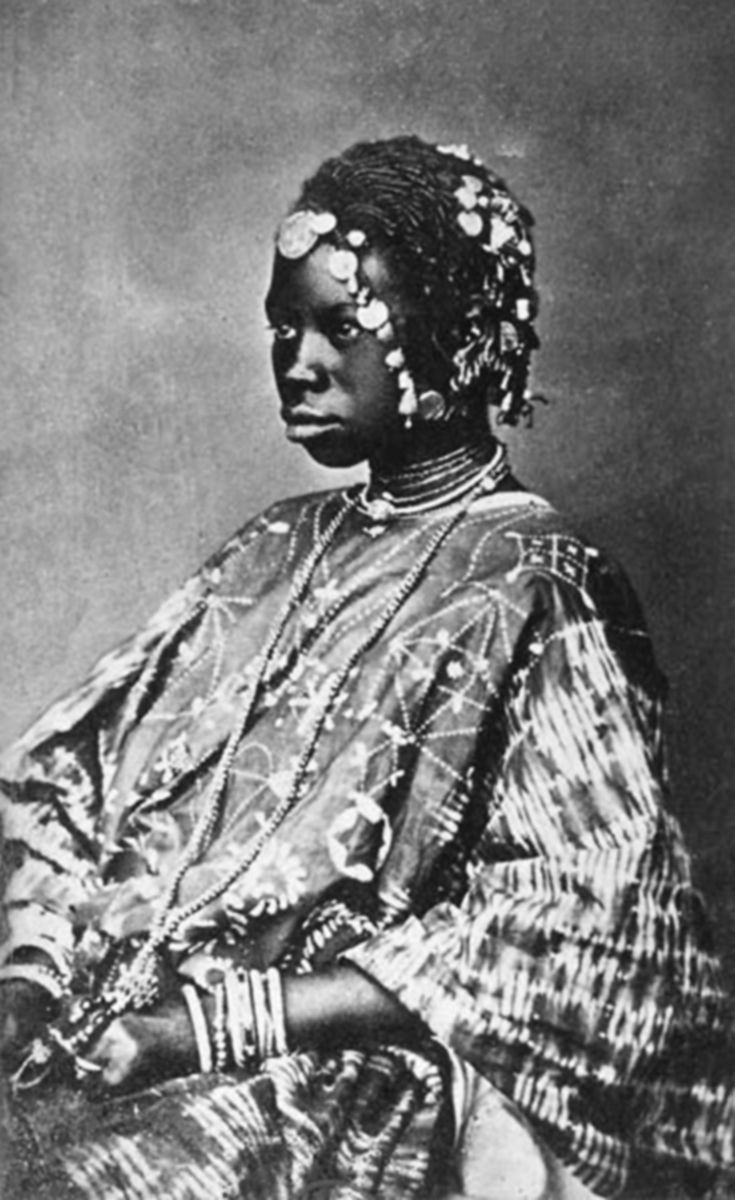
A boubou with thioup technique, Senegal ca. 1800-1900

The informal sector of trade in dyed fabric also called thioup or thioub, expanded in the 1980s. As a consequence fabrics such as bazin revived a boom in the fashion sector. Until 2000s cotton damask used to be worked by local craftsmen to become a noble fabric characterized by its stiffness and dazzling shine. However this craft slowly died out due to cheap competition from neighboring countries. Dyed bazin is now mainly imported in Senegal, they are then designed and sewn by local tailors who in turn export their products in West African countries and other parts of the world.

The first step in this craftsmanship is to dye the white fabric oftentimes with patterns made through a technique called tak. When the fabric is soaked in the dye bath, that technique makes it possible to preserve certain parts of the fabric, from dyeing and to form patterns in rings or strips. The fabric is then starched and beaten with wooden clubs by tappeurs until it results in a shiny noble bazin.

Senegalese tailors transform this bazin into clothing that is popular across the subregion from Guinea to Nigeria. The demand for the boubou, as well as the many stages through which it is transformed from raw material into a final product, make it important to the economy. Senegalese boubous are mainly exported to neighboring countries such as Gambia and Mali.

=== La grande nuit du bazin ===
La grande nuit du bazin or nuit du boubou (the night of bazin) is an event founded in 2004 in Dakar in honor of the popular fabric by Senegalese singer Djiby Dramé who wanted to revive traditional boubous. It's a festival of boubous, brilliance, colors and a delight to watch. Famous Senegalese designers and pioneers of modern Senegalese fashion such as Oumou Sy, Collé Ardo Sow, Diouma Dieng Diakhaté but also other designers from other countries are invited to that event. The success of la grande nuit du bazin lead to other branches in Bamako and Abidjan successively in 2014 and 2018. Djiby Dramé also intended to spread the grande nuit du bazin internationally and within the African diaspora. In this regard, he said "Since 2004, I have been organizing the event outside of Senegal, to introduce it to Africans in the diaspora. This year, after Dakar, we will go to Paris, London and the United States where the event is eagerly awaited by the fans."

== Gallery ==
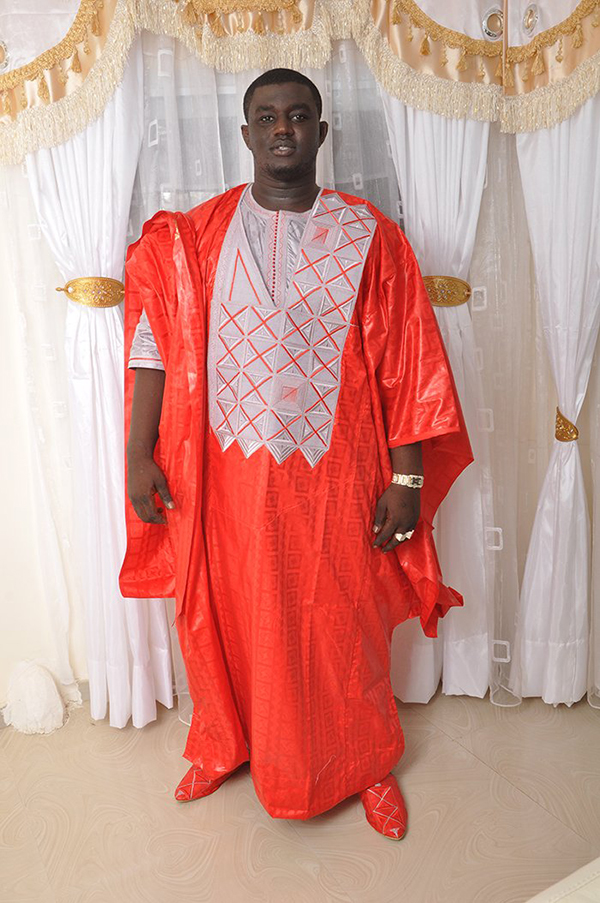
A grand boubou

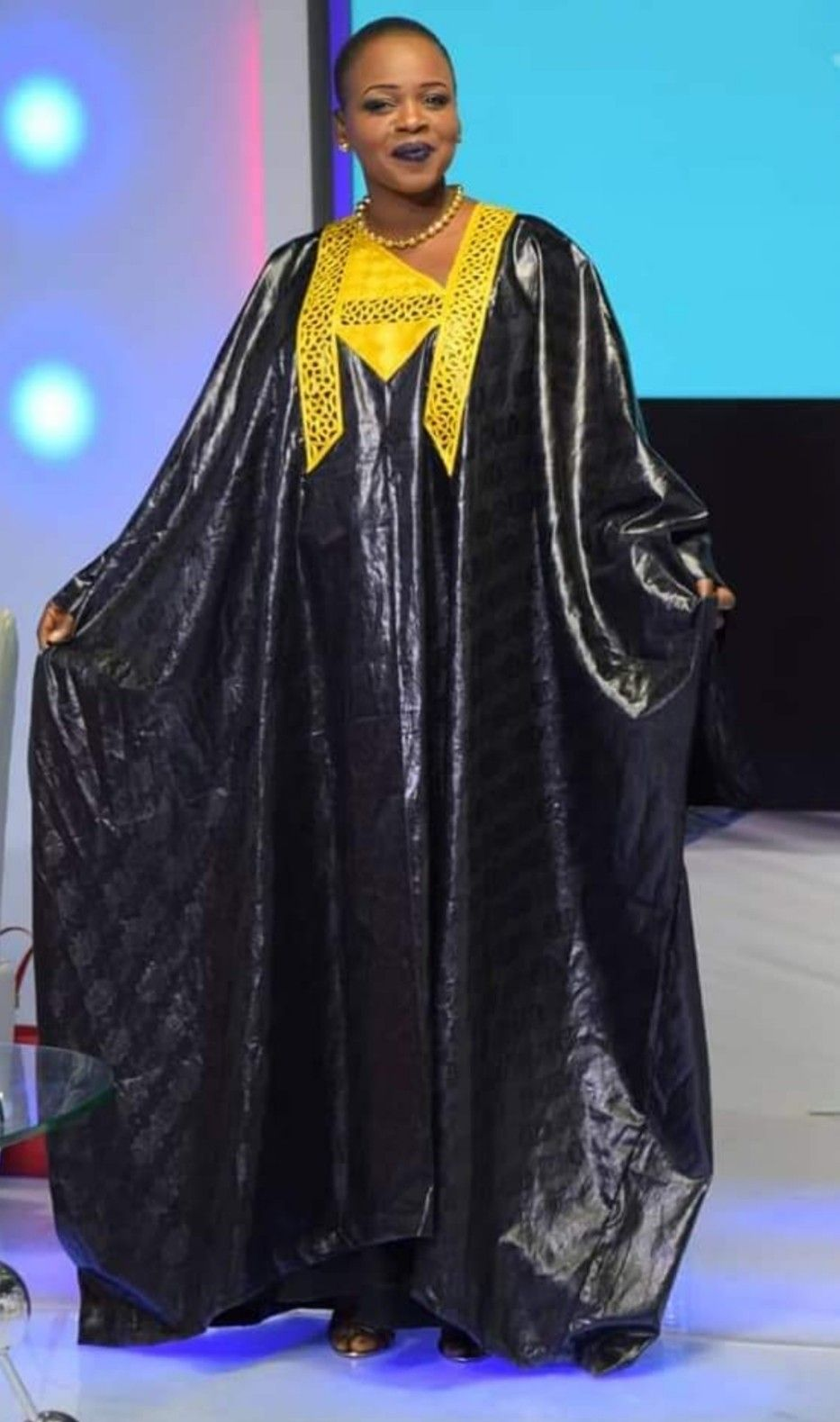
A boubou with golden embroidery

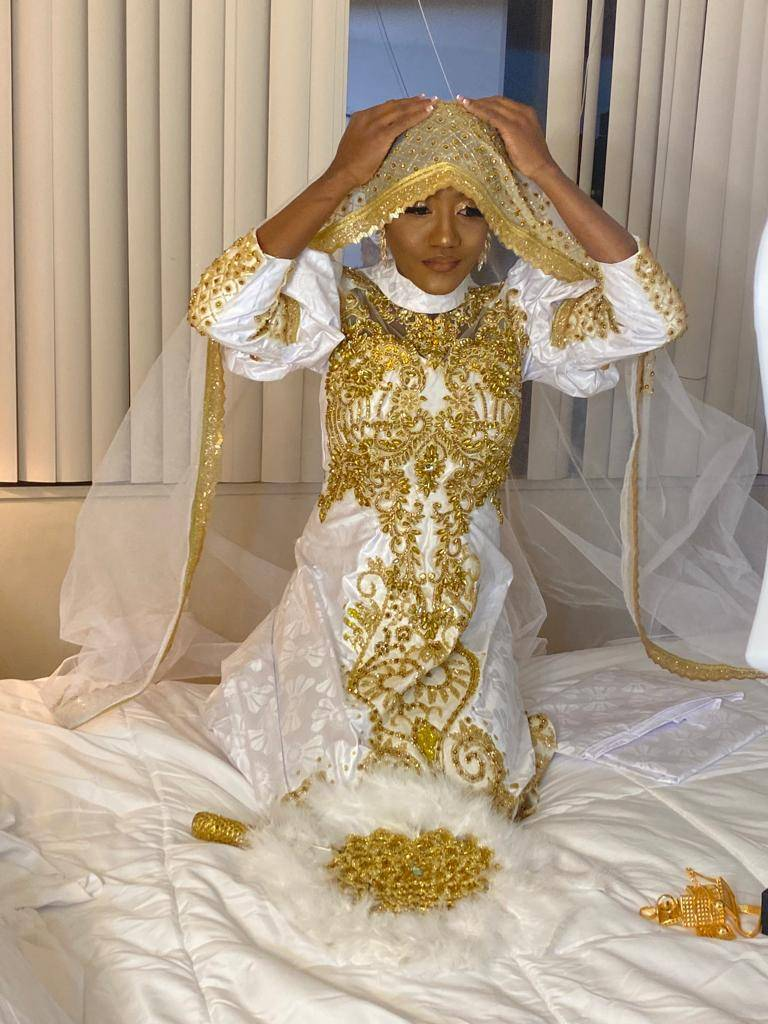
A wedding dress made with bazin

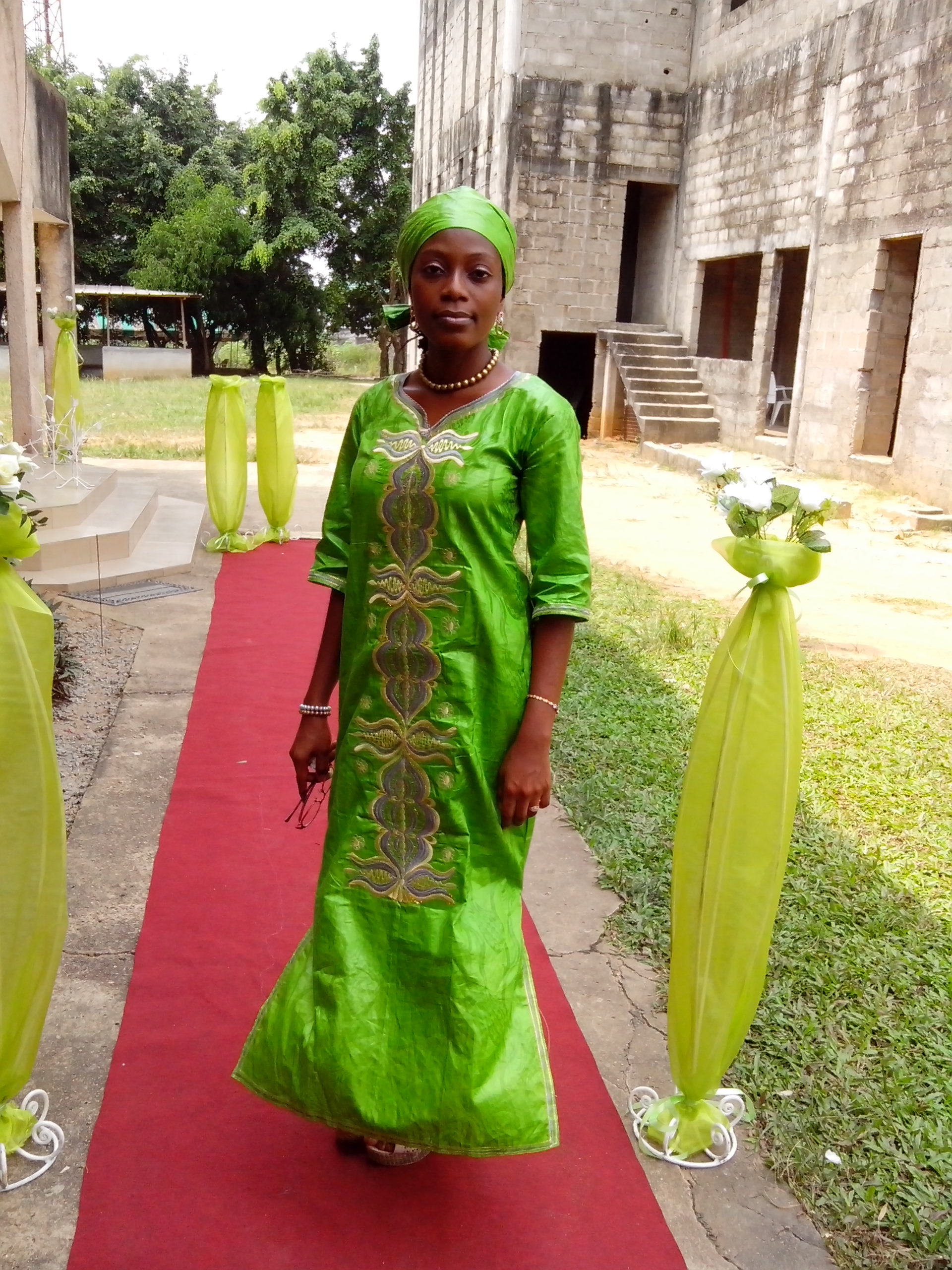
Boubou vert

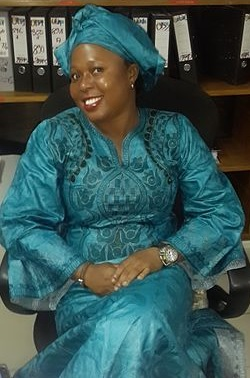
Woman, dressed in a boubou embroidered in turquoise blue bazin

== Bibliography ==
- Bernhard Gardi (2003). yes (ed.). Textiles du Mali. D'après les collections du Musée national du Mali. Bamako: Musée national du Mali. ISBN 9782911741241..
- Patricia Gérimont (2008). Teinturières à Bamako. Quand la couleur sort de sa réserve…. Paris: Ibis Press. ISBN 9782910728823..
- Kirby, Kelly (2013). "Bazin Riche in Dakar, Senegal: Altered Inception, Use and Wear". In Karen Tranberg Hansen; D. Soyini Madison (eds.). African Dress: Fashion, Agency, Performance. A&C Black. pp. 63–76. ISBN 9780857853813..
