= Sergius (name) =

- Gender: Male

Origin
- Origin: Latin, possibly from Etruscan
- Meaning: Unknown, originally "member of the Latin Gens Sergia". "Servant (of the law)" or "Protector", in connection with the Latin praenomen Servius, has been proposed.
- Region of origin: Italy, Europe

Sergius /ˈsɜːrdʒiəs/ is a male given name of Ancient Roman origin after the name of the Latin gens Sergia or Sergii of regal and republican ages. It is a common Christian name, in honour of Saint Sergius, and has been the name of four popes. It has given rise to numerous variants, present today mainly in the Romance (Serge, Sergio, Sergi, Sergiu) and Slavic languages (Serhii, Sergey, Serguei, Srđan). It is not common in English, although the Anglo-French name Sargent is possibly related to it.

== Etymology ==
The name originates from the Roman nomen (patrician family name) Sergius, after the name of the Roman gens of Latin origins Sergia or Sergii from Alba Longa, Old Latium, counted by Theodor Mommsen as one of the oldest Roman families, one of the original 100 gentes originaria. It has been speculated to derive from a more ancient Etruscan name but the etymology of the nomen Sergius is problematic. Chase hesitantly suggests a connection with the praenomen Servius, probably from an old Latin root meaning "to preserve" or "keep safe".

It became a personal name in Roman imperial times and spread to the Byzantine Empire in the Greek form Sergios (Σέργιος). It became popular in Christianity in honour of the fourth-century martyr and saint Sergius, especially among Roman ecclesiastics of Syrian extraction, starting in the seventh century.

Sergei was the second most popular name in Russia in the 1980s. In the Middle Ages in Western Europe, it fell into disuse. It became widespread again in the 1800s through translations of Russian literature, especially French translations.

== Worldwide ==
Its form varies by language:

- Albanian: Serxho
- Arabic: سركيس (Sarkis, from Armenian)
- Armenian: Սարգիս (Sargis or Sarkis)
- Assyrian Neo-Aramaic: ܣܪܓܝܤ (Sargis)
- Asturian: Serxu
- Azerbaijani: Sərgiz (from Armenian) or Sergey (from Russian)
- Basque: Sergio
- Belarusian: Сяргей (Siarhei or Siarhiej, pronounced [sʲarˈɣʲɛj]), diminutive Сяргейка (Siarheika [sʲarˈɣʲɛjka])
- Breton: Serj
- Bulgarian: Сергей (Sergei or Sergey)
- Catalan: Sergi
- Church Slavonic: Сергий (Sergii or Sergiy)
- Dutch: Serge
- English: Serge or Sargent
- Esperanto: Sergio
- French: Serge
- Galician: Serxio
- Georgian: სერგო (Sergo)
- Greek: Σέργιος (Sergios or Seryios)
- Hungarian: Szergiusz
- Italian: Sergio
- Latin: Sergius
- Latvian: Sergejs
- Lithuanian: Sergejus
- Macedonian: Сергеј (Sergej) or Срѓан (Srgjan)
- Maltese: Serġju (or modern-day use of Italian Sergio)
- Polish: Sergiusz
- Portuguese: Sérgio
- Romanian: Sergiu or Serghei
- Russian: Сергей (Sergei, Sergey), Russian diminutive Серёжа (Seryozha [sʲɪˈrʲɵʐə])
- Serbo-Croatian: Срђан (Srđan), Срђа (Srđa), Сергеј (Sergej), Сергије (Sergije)
- Slovak: Sergej
- Spanish: Sergio
- Turkish: Sergey (from Russian) or Serkis, Sarkis (from Armenian)
- Ukrainian: Сергій (Serhii [serˈɦij], Serhiy, Sergiy or Sergii), diminutive Сергійко (Serhiiko [serˈɦijko], Serhiyko or Sergiyko).

== Surname "Sérgio" ==
- Manuel Sérgio (1933–2025), Portuguese philosopher of sport, academic, activist and politician

== Given names ==
=== List of people with given name Sergius ===
==== Popes ====
- Pope Sergius I
- Pope Sergius II
- Pope Sergius III
- Pope Sergius IV

==== Eastern Orthodox Patriarchs ====
- Sergius of Bulgaria, Patriarch of Bulgaria c. 931 – c. 940
- Patriarch Sergius I of Constantinople, Patriarch 610–638
- Patriarch Sergius II of Constantinople, Patriarch 1001–1019
- Patriarch Sergius I of Moscow, Patriarch 1943–1944

==== Other Patriarchs ====
- Sergius of Tella (died 546), Syriac Orthodox Patriarch of Antioch in 544–546

==== Other Christian Saints ====
- Saint Sergius (martyr), Roman soldier companion of Saint Bacchus, martyred c. 303.
- Sergius of Cappadocia (died 304), Martyred c. 304.
- Sergius of Radonezh (1314–1392), 14th-century Russian monastic
- Sergius of Valaam Greek/Karelian/Russian monastic (Possible dates vary, from the 10th century to the mid-14th century)

==== Dukes of Naples ====
- Sergius I of Naples (died 864), Duke of Naples 840–864
- Sergius II of Naples, Duke of Naples 870–877
- Sergius IV of Naples (died 1036), Duke of Naples 1002–1036
- Sergius V of Naples (died 1082), Duke of Naples 1042–1082
- Sergius VI of Naples (died 1107), Duke of Naples 1082–1097
- Sergius VII of Naples (died 1137), Duke of Naples 1120–1137, last Duke of Naples

==== Dukes of Amalfi ====
- Sergius I of Amalfi (died 966), Duke of Amalfi 958–966
- Sergius II of Amalfi, Duke of Amalfi 1007–1028
- Sergius III of Amalfi (died 1073), Duke of Amalfi 1031–1073

==== Other people ====
- Sergius Paulus, proconsul of Cyprus, appears in the Book of Acts
- Lucius Sergius Catilina (died 62 BC), 1st century BCE Roman politician
- Marcus Sergius, Ancient Roman inventor of the prosthetic hand
- Sergius Orata, Ancient Roman merchant and architect
- Sergius (Byzantine general), general under Justinian I
- Sergius of Reshaina (died 536). Assyrian physician who translated medicine from Greek to Syriac
- Sergius-Tychicus, a ninth-century Paulician leader
- Metropolitan Sergius (Tikhomirov) of Japan, Russian Orthodox clergyman (1871–1945)
- Bahira, also called Sergius (c 600), Nestorian monk who foretold Muhammad's prophetic career
- Sergius (Chashin) (born 1974), bishop of the Russian Orthodox Church

=== List of people with given name Serge ===
- Serge Abiteboul (born 1953), French computer scientist
- Serge Biwole Abolo (born 1975), Cameroonian judoka
- Serge Adda (1948–2004), president of the French television station TV5
- Serge Arnaud Aka (born 1994), Ivorian professional footballer
- Serge Akakpo (born 1987), Togolese footballer
- Grand Duke Sergei Alexandrovich of Russia (1857–1905), son of Emperor Alexander II of Russia
- Serge Ambomo (born 1986), Cameroonian boxer
- Serge Andolenko (1907–1973), French military officer
- Serge Andreoni (born 1940), member of the Senate of France
- Serge Ankri (born 1949), film director
- Serge Atakayi (born 1999), Congolese footballer
- Serge Aubin (born 1975), Canadian professional ice hockey centre
- Serge Aubry (1942–2011), Canadian professional ice hockey goaltender
- Serge Augier (born 1969),
- Serge Aurier (born 1992), Ivorian footballer
- Serge Avédikian (born 1955), Armenian-French film and theatre actor, director, writer, and producer
- Serge Ayeli (born 1981), Ivorian football striker
- Serge Babary (born 1946), French politician
- Serge Dikulu Bageta (born 1978), Congolese footballer
- Serge Baguet (born 1969), Belgian professional road bicycle racer
- Raymond-Serge Balé (born 1949), Congolese diplomat and Congo-Brazzaville's Permanent Representative to the United Nations since 2008
- Serge Théophile Balima (born 1949), Burkinabé journalist, diplomat, and professor of the University of Ouagadougou
- Serge van den Ban (born 1980), Dutch football goalkeeper
- Serge Barjansky (1883–1940), Russian virtuoso cellist
- Serge Baudo (born 1927), French conductor
- Serge Bayonne (born 1970), Gabonese footballer
- Serge Beaudoin (born 1952), Canadian professional ice hockey player
- Serge Bec (1933–2021), French poet, journalist, writer, and art critic
- Serge Becker (born 1961), Swiss designer
- Serge de Beketch (1946–2007), French journalist, story writer for cartoons, and writer linked to the extreme-right
- Serge Bélanger, Canadian politician
- Serge Belongie, American computer scientist
- Serge Bengono (born 1977), Cameroonian sprinter who specializes in the 100 metres
- Serge Berdugo (born 1937), Moroccan politician
- Serge Bernier (born 1947), Canadian professional ice hockey right winger
- Serge Betsen (born 1974), French rugby union player
- Serge Beynaud (born 1987), Ivorian musician
- Serge Bezème (born 1977), Ivorian professional football player
- Serge Bindy (born 1954), Swiss modern pentathlete
- Serge Moléon Blaise (born 1951), Haitian painter
- Serge Blanc (footballer) (born 1972), French football player
- Serge Blanc (violinist) (1929–2013), French classical violinist
- Serge Blanco (born 1958), French rugby union footballer
- Serge Blisko (born 1950), French politician and a member of the National Assembly of France
- Serge Blusson (1928–1994), French cyclist
- Serge Boisvert (born 1959), Canadian ice hockey player
- Jean-Serge Bokassa (born 1972), Central African politician Minister of the Interior
- Serge Bolley, French cyclist
- Serge Lofo Bongeli (born 1983), DR Congolese football player
- Serge-Thomas Bonino (born 1961), French Catholic theologian
- Serge Bouchard (1947–2021), Canadian anthropologist
- Serge Bouemba (born 1967), Gabonese boxer
- Constant-Serge Bounda (born 1966), Congolese representative to the African Union
- Serge Bourdoncle (1936–2020), French football player and coach
- Serge Bourguignon (born 1928), French film director and screenwriter
- Serge Bramly (born 1949), French language writer and essayist
- Serge Brammertz (born 1962), Belgian jurist and the chief prosecutor for the International Residual Mechanism for Criminal Tribunals
- Serge Branco (born 1980), Cameroonian footballer
- Serge Brignoni (1903–2002), Swiss avant-garde painter and sculptor
- Sèrge Brou (born 1991), Ivorian football player
- Serge Brunier (born 1958), French photographer, reporter, and writer who has specialized in popular depictions of astronomical subjects
- Serge Brussolo (born 1951), French writer
- Serge Buttet (1954–2021), French swimmer
- Serge Cadorin (1961–2007), Belgian football striker
- Serge Cajfinger, French creator of the ready-to-wear clothing brand Paule Ka
- Serge Cantat (born 1973), French mathematician
- Serge Cantin (born 1945), Canadian bobsledder
- Serge Cardin (born 1950), Canadian politician
- Serge Carrière, Canadian physiologist, physician, and educator
- Serge Chaloff (1923–1957), American jazz baritone saxophonist
- Serge Chapleau (born 1945), French-Canadian political cartoonist from the province of Québec
- Serge Charchoune (1988–1975), Russian painter and poet
- Serge Chermayeff (1900–1996), Russian-born British architect, industrial designer, writer, and co-founder of several architectural societies
- Serge Chiesa (born 1950), French professional footballer
- Serge Clair (born 1940), Mauritian politician and the Chief Commissioner of Rodrigues from 2003 to 2006
- Serge Clerc (born 1957), French comic book artist and illustrator
- Serge Attukwei Clottey (born 1985), Ghanaian artist
- Issa Serge Coelo (born 1967), Chadian film director
- Serge Collot (1923–2015), French violist and music educator
- Serge Conus (1902–1988), Russian pianist and composer
- Serge Corbin, Canadian professional marathon canoe racer
- Serge Cormier (born 1976), Canadian politician
- Serge Cornut (born 1948), French equestrian
- Serge Van Cottom (born 1953), Belgian weightlifter
- Serge Crasnianski (born 1942), French entrepreneur who founded the Grenoble-based Key Independent System (KIS)
- Serge Daan (1940–2018), Dutch chronobiologist
- Serge Daney (1944–1992), French movie critic
- Serge Danot (1931–1990), French animator and advertising executive
- Serge Dassault (1925–2018), French billionaire heir, businessman, and conservative politician
- Serge David (1932–1991), French racing cyclist
- Serge Deble or Serges Déblé (born 1989), Ivorian professional football player
- Serge Dedina (born 1964), American mayor in Imperial Beach, California and the executive director of the non-profit environmentalist group Wildcoast
- Serge Delaive (born 1965), Belgian poet and novelist writing in the French language
- Serge Delmas (born 1947), French football player and manager
- Serge Demierre (born 1956), Swiss professional road bicycle racer
- Serge Deslières (1947–2020), Canadian politician and teacher
- Serge Despres (born 1978), Canadian bobsledder from Cocagne, New Brunswick
- Serge Devèze (1956–2015), French association football manager, active primarily in Africa with the national teams of Guinea, Gabon, and Benin
- Serge Diaghilev (1872–1929), Russian art critic, patron, ballet impresario, and founder of the Ballets Russes
- Serge Diantantu (1960–2022), Congolese comic book artist
- Serge Dié (born 1977), Ivorian footballer
- Serge Le Dizet (born 1964), French football coach and player
- Serge Djekanovic (born 1983), Serbian-born Canadian professional soccer player
- Serge Djelloul (born 1966), French ice hockey defenceman
- Serge Djiehoua (born 1983), Ivorian football player
- Serge Doubrovsky (1928–2017), French writer and 1989 Prix Médicis winner for Le Livre Brisé
- Serge Dube (born 1979), Canadian professional ice hockey defenceman
- Serge Dubois (born 1954), Belgian field hockey player
- Serge Ducosté (1944–2024), Haitian football defender
- Serge Dufoulon (1956–2022), French post-modern sociologist
- Serge Duigou (born 1948), French historian, specializing in the history of Brittany
- Serge Dupire (born 1958), Canadian actor
- Serge Duvernois (born 1960), French footballer
- Serge Dyot (born 1960), French judoka
- Serge Edongo (born 1982), Cameroonian professional volleyball player
- Serge Elisséeff (1889–1975), Russian-French scholar, Japanologist, and professor at Harvard University
- Jean Serge Essous (1935–2009), Congolese saxophonist, clarinettist, and co-founder of the Afrika Team in Paris, France
- Serge Faguet (born 1985), Russian entrepreneur
- Serge Fauchereau (born 1939), French art curator
- Serge Ferreira (born 1959), French Olympic athlete
- Serge Raynaud de la Ferriere (1916–1962), French religious philosopher
- Serge Fiori (1952–2025), Canadian singer-songwriter and musician
- Serge Fontaine (born 1947), Canadian politician in the province of Quebec
- Serge Fornara (born 1955), French rower
- Serge Gabernet (born 1955), French rugby union player
- Eric Serge Gagne (born 1976), Major League Baseball pitcher
- Serge Gainsbourg, born Lucien Ginsburg (1928–1991), French singer, songwriter, poet, composer, artist, actor, and director
- Serge Gaisser (born 1958), French footballer
- Serge Gakpé (born 1987), French-born Togolese football midfielder
- Serge Garant (1929–1986), Canadian composer, conductor, and professor of music at the University of Montreal
- Serge de Gastyne (1930–1992), French-American composer and pianist
- Serge Gavronsky (born 1932), American poet and translator
- Serge Gellé (born 1964), Malagasy politician
- Serge Geoffrion (born 1955), Quebec politician
- Serge Georges Jr. (born 1969 or 1970), American judge
- Serge & Christine Ghisoland (born 1946), Belgian singing duo who participated in the 1972 Eurovision Song Contest
- Serge Giacchini (1932–2021), French bobsledder
- Serge Giguère (born 1946), Canadian documentary filmmaker
- Serge Gilles (1936–2021), the leader of the Fusion of Haitian Social Democrats political party
- Serge Girard (born 1953), French ultramarathon runner
- Serge Gnabry, German professional footballer
- Serge Godard (born 1936), French politician
- Anne & Serge Golon or Anne Golon (1921–2017), French author, better known to English-speaking readers as Sergeanne Golon
- Serge Golon (1903–1972), writer and the husband of French author Anne Golon, in collaboration with whom he wrote the Angélique series
- Serge Golovach (born 1970), Russian contemporary artist
- Serge Grouard (born 1959), member of the National Assembly of France
- Serge Groussard (1921–2016), French journalist and writer
- Serge Gruzinski (born 1949), French historian and Latin Americanist
- Serge Guinchard (born 1946), French jurist, teacher, and emeritus professor of Pantheon-Assas University
- Serge Gumienny (born 1972), Belgian football referee
- Serge Gut (1927–2014), French musicologist
- Serge Halimi (born 1955), French journalist with the Le Monde Diplomatic since 1992
- Serge Haroche (born 1944), French physicist
- Serge Hazanavicius (born 1963), French actor and director
- Serge Hélan (born 1964), French triple jumper, known for his bronze medal at the 1995 World Indoor Championships
- Serge Hissung (born 1953), French bobsledder
- Serge Honi (born 1973), Cameroonian footballer who played as a forward
- Serge Houde (born 1953), Canadian film and television character actor
- Serge Hovey (1920–1989), American composer and ethnomusicologist
- Serge Hubert (1915–1997), French sports shooter
- Serge Huo-Chao-Si (born 1968), French contemporary artist and comic book creator
- Serge Hutin (1927–1997), French author on books on esoterica and the occult
- Serge Ibaka (born 1989), Spanish professional basketball player of Congolese origins
- Serge Osmena, III (born 1943), Filipino senator
- Serge Ivanoff (1893–1983), Russian painter
- Serge Janquin (1943–2024), member of the National Assembly of France
- Serge Jaroff (1896–1985), Russian-American founder, conductor, and composer of the Don Cossack Choir Serge Jaroff
- Serge Jentgen (born 1962), Luxembourgian football midfielder
- Serge Joncour (born 1961), French novelist and screenwriter
- Serge Joyal (born 1945), Canadian senator
- Serge July (born 1942), French journalist, founder of the daily Libération, and a prominent figure in French politics
- Serge Kabongo (born 1966), Congolese boxer
- Serge Kampf (1934–2016), French businessman who founded the computer services company Capgemini in 1967
- Serge Kaole (born 1990), Cameroonian footballer
- Serge Karlow (c. 1921–2005), American CIA technical officer falsely accused of treason and forced to resign
- Sèrge Kevyn (born 1994), Gabonese footballer
- Serge Klarsfeld (born 1935), Romanian-born French activist and Nazi hunter known for documenting the Holocaust
- Serge-Christophe Kolm (born 1932), French public economist, econometrician, and political philosopher
- Serge (Konovaloff) (1941–2003), archbishop of Western Europe of the Ecumenical Patriarchate of the Eastern Orthodox church from 1993 to 2003
- Serge Korber (1936–2022), French film director and screenwriter
- Serge Alexander Korff (1906–1989), Finnish-born American physicist
- Serge Koster (1940–2022), French writer and academic
- Konan Serge Kouadio (born 1988), Ivorian footballer
- Serge Koussevitzky (1874–1951), Russian-born Jewish conductor, composer, double bassist, and music director of the Boston Symphony Orchestra
- Serge F. Kovaleski (born 1961), American investigative reporter
- Serge Krizman (1914–2008), American actor, art director and production designer
- Serge Kujawa (1924–2014), Canadian politician
- Serge Kwetche (born 1976), Cameroonian footballer
- Serge Lagauche (born 1940), member of the Senate of France
- Serge Laget (1959–2023), French board game designer
- Serge Lairle (born 1956), French rugby union footballer and coach
- Serge Lajeunesse (born 1950), Canadian professional ice hockey defenceman
- Serge Lama (born 1943), French singer and songwriter
- Serge Lamothe (born 1963), French-Canadian writer
- Serge Lancel (1928–2005), French archaeologist and philologist
- Serge Lancen (1922–2005), French composer and classical pianist
- Serge Lang (1927–2005), French-born American mathematician
- Serge Lang (skiing) (1920–1999), French journalist, alpine skier, and the founder of the alpine skiing World Cup
- Serge Langis, Canadian basketball coach
- Serge Laprade (1941–2024), Canadian singer
- Serge Larcher (born 1945), member of the Senate of France
- Serge Latouche (born 1940, Vannes), French emeritus professor in economy at the University of Paris-Sud
- Serge Lazareff (1944–2021), Australian actor and scriptwriter
- Serge Le Griot (born 1995), Congolese musician
- Serge Le Tendre (born 1946), French comics writer
- Serge Lebovici (1915–2000), French psychiatrist and psychoanalyst
- Serge Leclaire (1924–1994), French psychiatrist and psychoanalyst
- Serge LeClerc (1950–2011), pardoned Canadian criminal, politician, and author
- Serge Legat or Sergei Legat (1875–1905), Russian ballet dancer
- Serge Legendre, French paleobiologist
- Serge Legrand (1937–2022), French biathlete
- Serge Lehman (born 1964), pseudonym of French science fiction writer Pascal Fréjean
- Serge Lemoyne (1941–1998), Canadian artist from Quebec
- Serge Lenoir (born 1947), French football player who played for Rennes, South Carolina Bastia and Stade Brestois
- Serge Lentz (1934–2021), French journalist and writer
- Serge Lepeltier (born 1953), French politician
- Serge Letchimy (born 1953), member of the National Assembly of France
- Serge Leuko (born 1993), Cameroonian professional footballer
- Serge Leveur (born 1957), French pole vaulter
- Serge Lifar (1905–1986), French ballet dancer and choreographer of Ukrainian origin
- Serge Lilo (born 1985), rugby union player who represents the Wellington Lions in the Air New Zealand Cup and the Hurricanes in Super Rugby
- Serge Lindier (1951–2019), French designer and comic book artist
- Serge Alain Liri (born 1979), Côte d'Ivoire footballer
- Serge Livrozet (1939–2022), French writer
- Serge-Paul Loga or Paul Loga (born 1969), Cameroonian football
- Serge Losique (born 1931), founder and president of the Montreal World Film Festival
- Serge Lutens (born 1942), French photographer, filmmaker, hair stylist, perfume art director, and fashion designer
- Serge Madikians, American chef
- Serge Maguy (born 1970), Ivorian football player
- Serge Makofo (born 1986), Congolese professional footballer
- Serge Malé, French senior UN official working for the Office of the United Nations High Commissioner for Refugees
- Serge Marcil (1944–2010), Quebec educator, administrator, and politician
- Serge Marcotoune (1890–1971), figure in European diplomacy and Martinism
- Christian Serge Maronga (1959–2008), Gabonese politician and president of the Rally of Democrats (RDD) party
- Serge Marquand (1930–2004), French actor and film producer
- Serge Marsolan (born 1945), French international rugby league player
- Serge Masnaghetti (born 1934), French professional football (soccer) player
- Serge Massar (born 1970), Belgian physicist
- Serge Maury (born 1946), French sailor and Olympic champion
- Serge Mayifuila, Congolese-born business owner, philanthropist
- Serge Ménard (born 1941), Quebec politician from Canada
- Serge Merlin (1932–2019), French actor
- Serge Mesonès (1948–2001), French footballer
- Serge Michel (born 1988), German boxer
- Serge Mimpo (born 1974), Cameroonian professional football player
- Joseph Serge Miot (1946–2010), Haitian archbishop of the Roman Catholic Church
- Serge Moati (born 1946), French artist, journalist, film director, and writer
- Serge Mogno, French rally raid driver
- Serge Mombouli, the Republic of the Congo's ambassador to the United States
- Serge Monast (1945–1996), Québécois investigative journalist, poet, essayist, and conspiracy theorist
- Serge Moscovici (1925–2014), Romanian-born French social psychologist, director of the Laboratoire Européen de Psychologie Sociale
- Serge Mouangue, Cameroonian artist and designer
- Serge Mouille (1922–1988), French industrial designer and goldsmith
- Serge Mputu Mbungu (born 1980), Congolese footballer
- Serge Muhmenthaler (born 1953), Swiss football player and referee
- Serge Muller (born 1976), French politician
- Serge Müller (born 2000), Swiss footballer
- Serge N'Gal (born 1986), Cameroonian footballer
- Serge Bando N'Gambé (born 1988), French footballer
- Serge N'Guessan (born 1994), Ivorian footballer
- Serge Ngoma (born 2005), American soccer player
- Serge Emaleu Ngomgoue (born 1985), Cameroonian footballer
- Serge-Junior Martinsson Ngouali (born 1992), Swedish footballer of Caribbean and Central African Republic descent
- Serge Nicolas, French author and professor of psychology
- Serge Nigg (1924–2008), French composer
- Serge Nilus or Sergei Nilus (1862–1929), Russian religious writer and self-described mystic
- Serge Noël (1956–2020), Belgian poet and author
- Serge Noskov (born 1956), Russian composer
- Serge Nubret (1938–2011), French professional bodybuilder, bodybuilding federation leader, movie actor, and author
- Serge Blanchard Oba, Congolese politician
- Serge Obolensky (1890–1978), Russian prince and vice chairman of the board of Hilton Hotels Corporation
- Serge Michel Odzoki (born 1948), Congolese politician
- Serge Oldenburg (1863–1934), Russian orientalist who specialized in Buddhist studies
- Serge Ornem, Paralympian athlete from France competing mainly in category T46 sprint events
- Serge Panizza (1942–2016), French fencer
- Serge Pankejeff (1886–1979), Russian aristocrat from Odesa known for being a patient of Sigmund Freud, who gave him the pseudonym Wolf Man
- Serge Parsani (born 1952), Italian professional road bicycle racer
- Serge Pauwels (born 1983), Belgian professional road bicycle racer
- Serge Payer (born 1979), Canadian professional ice hockey player
- Serge Pelissou, Canadian electrical engineer
- Serge Perrault (1920–2014), French ballet dancer
- Serge Perruchini (born 1955), Monegasque-born French footballer
- Serge Piménoff (1895–1960), French art director
- Serge Pizzorno (born 1980), British guitarist and songwriter, worked with the indie rock band Kasabian
- Serge Poignant (born 1947), member of the National Assembly of France
- Serge Poliakoff (1906–1969), Russian-born French modernist painter belonging to the 'New' Ecole de Paris (Tachisme)
- Serge de Poligny (1903–1983), French screenwriter and film director
- Serge Poltoratzky (1803–1884), Russian literary scholar, bibliophile, and humanitarian
- Serge Postigo (born 1968), French-born Quebec actor
- Serge Poudrier (born 1966), French ice hockey player
- Serge Prokofiev (1891–1953), Russian composer, pianist, and conductor
- Serge Provost (born 1952), Canadian composer and organist
- Serge Provost (professor), Canadian professor at the University of Western Ontario
- Serge Proulx (born 1953), Canadian cyclist
- Serge Quesnel (born 1970), Canadian gangster
- Serge Quisquater, Belgian musician
- Serge Rachmaninoff (1873–1943), Russian composer, pianist, and conductor
- Serge Racine (born 1951), Haitian football defender
- Serge of Radonezh (c. 1314–1392), spiritual leader and monastic reformer of medieval Russia
- Serge-Philippe Raux-Yao (born 1999), French professional footballer
- Serge Ravanel (1920–2009), French engineer, author, and World War II resistance fighter
- Serge Raymond (born 1967/1968), Canadian retired Paralympic athlete
- Serge Reding (1941–1975), Belgian weightlifter
- Serge Reggiani (1922–2004), Italian-born French singer and actor
- Serge Reid (born 1963), Canadian curler
- Serge Renko, French actor
- Serge Rezvani (born 1928), French artist and writer
- Serge Riaboukine (born 1957), French actor
- Serge Ricard, professor of American Civilization at the University of Paris III-Sorbonne Nouvelle
- Serge Roberge (born 1965), professional ice hockey player
- Serge Robert (born 1970), Quebec musician who sings in French
- Serge Robert (wrestler) (born 1963), French wrestler
- Serge Robichaud, Canadian politician and member of the Legislative Assembly of New Brunswick
- Serge Romano (born 1964), French professional football defender
- Serge Roques (born 1947), French politician and Mayor of Villefranche-de-Rouergue (Aveyron)
- Serge Roullet (1926–2023), French film director and screenwriter
- Serge Rousseau (1930–2007), French film and television actor and agent
- Serge Rubanraut (1948–2008), Australian chess master
- Serge Rubinstein (1908–1955), stock and currency manipulator
- Serge Ruchet (born 1938), Swiss racing cyclist
- Serge Rudaz (born 1954), Canadian theoretical physicist and professor of physics at the University of Minnesota
- Serge Sabarsky (1912–1996), American art collector and art dealer
- Serge Saltykov (1726–1765), Russian officer (chamberlain) who became the first lover of Empress Catherine the Great after her arrival in Russia
- Serge Sandberg (1879–1981), French film producer
- Serge Sargsian (born 1954), third president of Armenia
- Serge Sauneron (1927–1976), French Egyptologist
- Serge Sauvion (1929–2010), French actor
- Serge Savard (born 1946), Canadian professional ice hockey defenceman
- Serge Schmemann (born 1945), American writer for the New York Times
- Serge Segay (1947–2014), Russian artist, poet, and writer
- Serge Semenenko (1903–1980), Ukrainian-born Hollywood banker
- Victor Serge (1890–1947), Russian revolutionary and writer
- Serge Silberman (1917–2003), French film producer
- Serge Simard (born 1950), Canadian politician in the province of Quebec
- Serge Sorokko (born 1954), American art dealer, publisher and owner of the Serge Sorokko Gallery in San Francisco
- Serge Souchon-Koguia (born 1987), Central African Republican footballer
- Serge Soudoplatoff, French technologist, commentator, and author
- Serge Soulié (born 1969), French professional tennis player
- Serge Spitzer, Romanian-born American artist
- Serge Alexandre Stavisky (1886–1934), French financier and embezzler
- Serge Stresser (born 1953), French weightlifter
- Serge Sudeikin (1882–1946), Russian artist and set-designer associated with the Ballets Russes and the Metropolitan Opera
- Serge Tabekou (born 1996), Cameroonian footballer
- Serge Tatiefang (born 1987), Cameroonian defensive midfielder
- Serge Tcherepnin (born 1941), American composer and electronic instrument builder
- Serge Tchuruk (born 1937), French businessman
- Serge Telle (born 1955), French diplomat
- Serge Testa, Australian yachtsman who holds the world record for the circumnavigation in the smallest boat, completing the voyage in 1987
- Serge Teyssot-Gay (born 1963), French guitarist of rock group Noir Désir
- Serge Thériault (born 1948), Quebec comedian and actor
- Serge Patrice Thibodeau (born 1951), Canadian writer
- Serge Thill (born 1969), Luxembourgish footballer
- Serge Thion (1942–2017), French sociologist
- Serge Thomas (born 1951), French boxer
- Serge Timashev (born 1937), Russian chemist
- Serge Torsarkissian, Lebanese member of Parliament
- Serge Tousignant (born 1942), Canadian artist and photographer
- Serge Toussaint, Haitian-American artist and muralist
- Serge Tremblay (born 1973), Canadian weightlifter
- Serge Trifkovic (born 1954), Serbian-American writer for the paleoconservative magazine Chronicles
- Serge Trinchero (born 1949), Swiss/Italian footballer
- Serge Tsmikeboki (born 1967), professional footballer who played as a striker
- Serge Turgeon (1946–2004), Quebec actor and union leader
- Serge Vandercam (1924–2005), Belgian painter, photographer, sculptor, and ceramist associated with the CoBrA group
- Serge Vaudenay (born 1968), French cryptographer
- Serge Véber (1897–1976), French screenwriter and film director
- Serge Venturini (born 1955), French poet
- Serge Vieira (1977–2023), French chef
- Serge Vinçon (1949–2007), French politician of the UMP party
- Serge Vohor (1955–2024), Vanuatuan politician
- Serge von Bubnoff (1888–1957), German geologist and geotechnical engineer
- Serge Voronoff (1866–1951), French surgeon of Russian extraction, grafted monkey testicle tissue onto the testicles of men
- Serge Wawa (born 1986), Ivorian football defender
- Serge Weinberg (born 1951), French founder and chairman of the investment firm Weinberg Capital Partners
- Serge Wilmes (born 1982), Luxembourgish politician
- Serge Julievich, Count Witte (1849–1915), Russian policy-maker who presided over extensive industrialization within the Russian Empire
- Serge Wolkonsky (1860–1937), Russian theatrical worker, one of the first Russian proponents of eurhythmics
- Serge Yoffou (born 1971), Ivorian international footballer who played as a forward
- Serge Aleksandrovich Zenkovsky (1907–1990), Russian historian
- Serge Zwikker (born 1973), Dutch-American basketball player

=== List of people with given name Sergei, Sergey or Serguei ===
- Serguei (singer) (1933–2019), Brazilian singer and composer
- Sergei Agababov (1926–1959), Russian composer
- Sergey Aksyonov (born 1972), Russian politician, head of Russian-controlled Republic of Crimea
- Sergei Andrejev (1897–1930), Estonian Communist politician
- Sergey Androsenko (born 1988), Belarusian LGBTQ rights activist
- Sergei Berezin (born 1971), Russian ice hockey winger
- Sergey Bida (born 1993), Russian Olympic medalist épée fencer
- Sergei Biriukov (born 1998), Russian para-athlete
- Sergei Bobrovsky (born 1988), Russian NHL ice hockey player
- Sergei Viktorovich Bochkarev (born 1941), Russian mathematician
- Sergei Bodrov (born 1948), Russian film director, screenwriter, and producer
- Sergei Bodrov Jr (1971–2002), Russian actor, and film director
- Sergei Bondarchuk (1920–1994), Soviet film director
- Sergey Brin (born 1973), American entrepreneur and co-founder of Google
- Sergei Brushko, Belarusian photographer
- Sergey Bubka (born 1963), Ukrainian pole vaulter
- Sergei Bulgakov (1871–1944), Russian Orthodox theologian, philosopher, and economist
- Sergei Diaghilev (1872–1929), founder of Ballets Russes
- Sergey Diomidov (1943–2024), Soviet gymnast
- Sergei Dovlatov (1941–1990), Russian writer and dissident
- Sergei Eisenstein (1898–1948), Soviet film director
- Sergei Fedorov (born 1969), Russian NHL ice hockey player
- Sergey Furgal (born 1970), Russian politician and political prisoner
- Sergey Gandlevsky (born 1952), Russian poet
- Sergei Gonchar (born 1974), Russian NHL ice hockey player
- Sergei Grinkov (1967–1995), Russian ice skating champion
- Sergey Grishin (businessman) (1966–2023), Russian entrepreneur
- Sergei Issakov (1931–2013), Estonian literary scholar and politician
- Sergei Kharitonov (born 1980), Russian mixed martial arts fighter
- Sergey Karjakin (born 1990), Russian (formerly Ukrainian) chess grandmaster
- Sergey Kirov (1886–1934), Soviet revolutionary leader
- Sergey Kiselnikov (1958–2020), Soviet footballer
- Sergey Kislyak (born 1950), Russian politician and ambassador to the United States
- Sergei Korolev (1907–1966), Soviet rocket engineer
- Sergei Korolev (born 1962), Russian intelligence officer
- Sergei Korolev (1874–1932), Russian founder of industrial microbiology
- Sergei Kourdakov (1951–1973), Russian KGB agent who defected to Canada
- Sergei Krikalev (born 1958), Soviet/Russian cosmonaut
- Sergey Lazarev (born 1983), Russian pop singer/opera actor
- Sergey Lavrov (born 1950), Russian foreign minister
- Sergey Lebedev (footballer) (born 1969), Uzbekistani football midfielder
- Sergey Leonov (born 1983), Russian politician
- Sergey Lukyanenko (born 1968), Russian science fiction and fantasy writer
- Sergey Lyakhov (born 1968), Russian discus thrower and shot putter
- Sergei Lyapunov (1859–1924), Russian musician and composer
- Sergei Lysov (born 2004), Israeli wheelchair tennis player
- Sergei Makarov (ice hockey, born 1958), NHL and Soviet National ice-hockey player
- Sergei Maslyak (born 1980), Belarusian politician
- Sergey Mikhaylov (disambiguation), several people
- Sergei Nakariakov (born 1977), Russian trumpeter
- Sergey Nechayev (1847–1882), Russian nihilist revolutionary
- Sergei Novikov (mathematician) (1938–2024), Soviet and Russian mathematician
- Sergey Pantsirev (born 1969), Russian poet
- Sergei Polunin (born 1989), Russian ballet dancer
- Sergei Prokofiev (1891–1953), Russian composer
- Sergei Rachmaninoff (1873–1943), Russian musician and composer
- Sergii Radonezhsky (1314–1392), spiritual leader of medieval Russia
- Sergey Richter (born 1989), Israeli Olympic sport shooter
- Sergei Romanov (disambiguation), several people
- Sergey Rusin (born 1959), Soviet freestyle swimmer
- Sergei Ryabkov (born 1960), Russian deputy foreign minister
- Sergey Ryabtsev (born 1956), Russian violin player with Gogol Bordello
- Sergei Sakhnovsky (born 1975), Israeli ice dancer
- Sergei Samsonov (born 1978), Russian ice hockey player
- Sergey Sangalov (born 1959), Russian contemporary artist
- Sascha Schapiro (1889–c. 1942), Russian anarchist revolutionary who used the nom de guerre Sergei
- Sergey Sharikov (1974–2015), Russian Olympic saber fencer
- Sergey Shnurov (born 1973), Russian musician and songwriter
- Sergey Shoigu (born 1955), Russian minister of defence
- Sergei Shtsherbakov (1871–1937), Estonian farmer and politician
- Sergey Sobyanin (born 1958), Russian politician and mayor of the city of Moscow
- Sergei Stanishev (born 1966), Bulgarian prime minister
- Sergey Stepanov (musician) (born 1984), Moldovan saxophonist
- Sergey Surovikin (born 1966), Russian army general
- Sergei Tabachnikov, Russian mathematician
- Sergey Taboritsky (1897–1980), Russian ultranationalist and Nazi collaborator
- Sergei Tikhanovsky (born 1978), Belarusian pro-democracy activist, political prisoner, and husband of President Svetlana Tikhanovskaya
- Serguei Tetioukine (born 1975), Russian volleyball player
- Sergei Tretyakov (intelligence officer) (1956–2010), Russian SVR defector
- Sergey Usenya (born 1988), Belarusian footballer
- Sergei Ivanovich Vasiliev (born 1961), Russian businessman
- Sergei Yesenin (1895–1925), Russian poet
- Sergey Zagraevsky (1964–2020), Russian painter
- Sergei Zelenov (born 1980), Russian footballer
- Sergey Zhukov (born 1976), Russian pop singer
- Sergey Zimov (born 1955), Russian geophysicist and creator of Pleistocene Park
- Sergei Zjukin (born 1972), Estonian chess player

=== List of people with given name Sergej ===
- Sergej Ćetković (born 1976), Montenegrin singer
- Sergej Ignatkov (born 2007), Serbian footballer
- Sergej Milinković-Savić (born 1995), Serbian footballer
- Sergej Sekulović, Montenegrin politician
- Sergej Trifunović (born 1972), Serbian actor

=== List of people with given name Sergi ===
- Sergi Agustí, Spanish film director
- Sergi Barjuán (born 1971), footballer
- Sergi Belbel (born 1963), Spanish Catalan playwright
- Sergi Bruguera (born 1971), Spanish tennis player
- Sergio Dalma (born 1964), a Spanish singer whose real name is Josep Sergi Capdevila
- Sergi Durán (born 1976), tennis player
- Sergi Enrich (born 1990), Spanish footballer
- Sergi Escobar (born 1974), Spanish world champion track cyclist
- Sergi Gómez (born 1992), Spanish footballer
- Sergi Gvarjaladze (born 1967), Georgian TV and radio presenter, film director, producer and musician
- Sergi Jordà (born 1961), Spanish Catalan innovator, installation artist, digital musician
- Sergi López Segú (1967–2006), footballer
- Sergi López i Ayats (born 1965), actor
- Sergi Pàmies (born 1960), Spanish Catalan writer, translator, journalist and television and radio presenter
- Sergi Pedrerol (born 1969), Spanish water polo player
- Sergi Roberto (born 1992), Spanish footballer
- Sergi Vidal (born 1981), Spanish basketball player

=== List of people with given name Sergio or Sérgio ===
==== Multiple people ====
- Sergio Abreu
- Sergio Álvarez
- Sergio Aquino
- Sergio Cabrera
- Sergio Campana
- Sergio de Castro
- Sergio Díaz
- Sergio Escudero
- Sergio Fernández
- Sergio García
- Sergio Gil
- Sergio González
- Sergio Hernández
- Sérgio Júnior
- Sergio López
- Sergio Lozano
- Sérgio Manoel
- Sergio Martínez
- Sergio Peña
- Sergio Pérez
- Sérgio Ricardo
- Sérgio Rodrigues
- Sergio Rodríguez
- Sergio Sánchez
- Sergio Santos
- Sergio Torres
- Sergio Vega
- Sergio Vergara
- Sergio Villanueva

==== Individuals ====
- Sérgio Abreu (actor) (born 1975), Brazilian actor
- Sergio Acevedo (born 1956), Argentine politician
- Sergio Aguayo (born 1947), Mexican academic and activist
- Sergio Agüero, Argentine footballer
- Sergio Ahumada (born 1948), Chilean footballer
- Sergio Albert (born 1951), American football player
- Sergio Albeverio (born 1939), Swiss mathematician
- Sergio Alcántara (born 1996), Dominican baseball player
- Sergio Alfafara (born 1920, date of death unknown), Cebuano Visayan writer
- Sergio Allievi (born 1964), German footballer
- Sergio Almaguer (born 1969), Mexican coach and footballer
- Sergio Bailey (born 1994), American football player
- Sergio Bernardo Almirón (born 1980), Argentine footballer
- Sergio Omar Almirón (born 1958), Argentine footballer
- Sergio Oscar Almirón (born 1985), Argentine footballer
- Sergio Fernández Álvarez (born 1975), Spanish footballer
- Sérgio Estanislau do Amaral (1925–1996), Brazilian geologist
- Sergio Amidei, Italian screenwriter
- Sergio Zarzar Andonie (born 1952), Chilean entrepreneur and politician
- Sérgio da Silva Andrade (born 1982), Portuguese footballer
- Sergio Andreoli (1922–2002), Italian footballer
- Sergio Salvador Aguirre Anguiano (1943–2020), Mexican jurist
- Sérgio Chapelin (born 1941), Brazilian Presenter
- Sergio Apostol (born 1935), Filipino lawyer and politician
- Sergio Aragonés (born 1937), cartoonist and writer
- Sergio Aragoneses (born 1977), Spanish footballer
- Sergio Araujo (born 1992), Argentine footballer
- Sérgio Araújo, Brazilian footballer
- Sérgio Luís de Araújo (born 1970), Brazilian footballer
- Sergio Méndez Arceo (1907–1992), Mexican bishop and activist
- Sergio Arias (born 1988), Mexican footballer
- Sergio Arredondo, Mexican bullfighter
- Sergio Arruda, Brazilian diplomat
- Sergio Asenjo, Spanish footballer
- Sergio Assad, Brazilian guitarist and composer
- Sergio Atzeni (1952–1995), Italian writer
- Sergio Ávila, Mexican footballer
- Sergio Babb (born 1982), Dutch footballer
- Sergio Bagú (1911–2002), Argentinian Marxist historian, sociologist and political philosopher
- Sergio Balanzino (1934–2018), Italian diplomat
- Sergio Ballesteros (born 1975), Spanish footballer
- Sergio Hugo Sánchez Ballivián, Bolivian diplomat
- Sergio Barbarossa, Italian engineer
- Silvio Sergio Bonaccorsi Barbato (1959–2009), Italian-Brazilian conductor and composer
- Sergio Barbero (born 1969), Italian racing cyclist
- Sergio Paulo Barbosa (born 1980), aka Duda, Portuguese footballer
- Sérgio Baresi (born 1973), Brazilian footballer
- Sérgio Filipe da Silva Barge (born 1984), Portuguese footballer
- Sergio Barila (born 1973), Spanish–Equatoguinean footballer
- Sergio Villarreal Barragán (born 1969), Mexican federal police officer
- Sergio Barreda (1951–2002), Peruvian surfer and surfboard shaper
- Sergio Basañez (born 1970), telenovela actor
- Sergio Bastida (born 1979), Argentine footballer
- Sergio Batista (born 1962), Argentine footballer
- Sergio Battistini (born 1963), Italian footballer
- Sergio Bello (Intra, 6 May 1942), Italian sprinter
- Sergio Benedetti (1942–2018), Italian art historian
- Sergio Gutiérrez Benítez (born 1945), Mexican priest and wrestler
- Sergio Bergamelli (born 1970), Italian alpine skier
- Sergio Berlato (born 1959), Italian politician
- Sergio Berlinguer (1934–2021), Italian diplomat
- Sergio Berlioz (born 1963), composer and musicologist
- Sergio Bernal (born 1970), Mexican footballer
- Sergio Bernardino (born 1953), footballer
- Júlio Sérgio Bertagnoli (born 1978), Brazilian footballer
- Sergio Berti (nicknamed La Bruja; born 1969), Argentine footballer
- Sergio Bertoni (1915–1995), Italian footballer
- Paulo Sérgio Betanin (born 1986), Brazilian footballer
- Sergio Bianchetto (born 1939), Italian Olympic racing cyclist
- Sergio Bizzio, Argentine writer and director
- Sergio Blanco (born 1981), Uruguayan footballer
- Sergio Bonelli (1932–2011), Italian comic-book author and publisher
- Sergio Boris, Argentine film actor
- Sergio Álvarez Boulet (born 1979), Cuban weightlifter
- Sergio Braga (born 1984), Brazilian footballer
- Sergio Moraes Castanheira Brandao, Brazilian TV journalist and science communicator
- Sergio Bravo (1927–1997), Mexican footballer
- Sergio Brighenti (1932–2022), Italian footballer and coach
- Sergio Brio (born 1956), Italian footballer
- Paulo Sérgio Bento Brito (born 1968), Portuguese footballer and coach
- Sérgio Britto (born 1959), Brazilian keyboardist and singer
- Sergio Brown (born 1988), American football player
- Sergio Bruni (1921–2003), Italian singer, guitarist and songwriter
- Sergio Brusin, medicinal expert
- Sergio Bueno (born 1962), Mexican football manager
- Sergio Bufarini (born 1963), Argentine footballer
- Sérgio Burgani, Brazilian clarinetist
- Sergio Buso (1950–2011), Italian footballer and coach
- Sergio Busquets (born 1988), Spanish footballer
- Sergio Bustamante (artist), Mexican sculptor
- Sergio Bustamante (1934–2014), Mexican actor
- Sergio Bustos (born 1972), Argentine footballer
- Sergio Buzó (born 1977), Paraguayan artist
- Sergio Calderon (born 2000), American singer in the band In Real Life
- Sergio Calligaris (born 1941), Argentine pianist and composer
- Sergio de Camargo (1930–1990), Brazilian
- Sergio Cammariere (born 1960), Italian jazz singer and songwriter
- Sergio Campana (footballer) (1934–2025), Italian lawyer and footballer
- Sergio Campana (racing driver) (born 1986), Italian racing driver
- Sergio Campbell (born 1992), Jamaican footballer
- Sergio Canales (born 1991), Spanish footballer
- Sergio Canamasas (born 1988), Spanish racing driver
- Sergio Alejandro Ortega Cantero (born 1988), Paraguayan footballer
- Sergio Caprari (1932–2015), Italian Olympic boxer
- Sergio Caputo (born 1954), Italian artist, composer and guitarist
- Sergio Cariello (born 1964), Brazilian-American comic-book artist
- Sergio Carlo (born 1977), Dominican actor
- Sérgio Nascimento de Camargo (born 1965), Brazilian journalist and politician
- Sérgio Manuel Costa Carneiro (nicknamed Serginho; born 1991), Portuguese footballer
- Sergio Carnesalini (born 1982), Italian footballer
- Sergio Carpanesi (born 1936), Italian footballer and coach
- Sergio Casal (born 1962), Spanish tennis player
- Sergio Cassiano (born 1967), Brazilian composer, percussionist, writer, producer, and bandleader
- Sergio Castelletti (1937–2004), Italian footballer and manager
- Sergio Castellitto (born 1953), Italian actor and director
- Sergio Díaz Castilla (born 1991), Spanish footballer
- Sergio Badilla Castillo (born 1947), Chilean poet
- Sergio Rogelio Castillo (born 1970), Argentine–Bolivian footballer
- Matteo Sergio Cavagna (born 1985), Italian footballer
- Sergio Ceccotti (born 1935), Italian painter
- Sergio Cervato (1929–2005), Italian footballer
- Sergio Chejfec, Argentine Jewish writer
- Sergio Chiamparino (born 1948), Italian politician
- Sergio Ciattaglia, Argentine footballer
- Sergio Citti (1933–2005), Italian film director and screenwriter
- Sergio Clerici (born 1941), Brazilian footballer
- Sergio Peña Clos (1927–2018), Puerto Rican politician
- Sergio Codognato (born 1944), Italian footballer and coach
- Sergio Cofferati (born 1948), Italian politician and union leader
- Sergio Coggiola, Italian automobile designer
- Sérgio Mendes Coimbra (born 1988), Brazilian footballer
- Sérgio Comba (born 1979), Argentine footballer
- Sérgio Conceição (born 1974), Portuguese footballer
- Sergio Álvarez Conde (born 1986), Spanish footballer
- Sergio Contreras (born 1980), Mexican baseball player
- Sergio Corbucci (1927–1990), Italian film director
- Sergio Corino (born 1974), Spanish footballer
- Sergio Coronado (born 1970), member of the National Assembly of France
- Sergio P. Corpus (1913–2004), Filipino businessman
- Sergio Corrieri (1938–2008), Cuban actor
- Sergio Cortés (born 1968), Chilean tennis player
- Mário Sérgio Santos Costa (born 1990), Brazilian footballer
- Paulo Sergio da Costa (footballer) (born 1979), Portuguese footballer
- Sergio Coterón (born 1961), basketball player
- Sergio Cotta (1920–2007), Italian philosopher, jurist and university professor
- Sérgio Pereira Couto (born 1967), Portuguese-Brazilian writer
- Sergio Cragnotti (born 1940), Italian entrepreneur and author
- Sergio Cravero, the chief executive officer (CEO) of Italian car maker Alfa Romeo until spring 2010
- Sergio Cresto (USA) (1956–1986), co-driver of Henri Toivonen for the 1986 World Rally Championship season
- Sérgio Eduardo Ferreira da Cunha (born 1972), Brazilian footballer
- Sergio Dalma, Spanish pop singer
- Sergio D'Asnasch (born 1934), Italian sprinter
- Sergio de los Ríos (born 2003), Mexican footballer
- Sergio DellaPergola (born 1942), Italian-born Israeli professor and demographic expert
- Sergio Denis (1949–2020), Argentine singer-songwriter and actor
- Sérgio Dias (born 1951), Brazilian rock musician, composer and guitarist
- Sérgio Rodrigo Penteado Dias (born 1980), Brazilian footballer
- Sergio Álvarez Díaz (born 1992), Spanish footballer
- Sergio Díaz (footballer, born 1985) (born 1985), Spanish footballer
- Sergio Diduch, Argentine footballer
- Sergio van Dijk (born 1982), Dutch footballer
- Sergio Doménech (born 1976), Spanish judoka
- Sergio Domini (born 1961), Italian football player
- Sergio Donati (born 1933), Italian screenwriter
- Sérgio Luís Donizetti (born 1964), footballer
- Sergio Doplicher (1940–2025), Italian mathematical physicist
- Sergio Dorantes (born 1946), Mexican photojournalist jailed for the murder of his wife
- Sergio de Queiroz Duarte (born 1934), Brazilian diplomat
- Sergio Echigo (born 1945), Nisei Japanese Brazilian footballer
- Sergio Endrigo (1933–2005), Italian singer-songwriter
- Sergio Erill (1938–2020), Catalonian physician, clinical pharmacologist, professor and researcher
- Sergio Ermotti, Swiss banker
- Sergio Escalante (born 1986), Argentine footballer
- Sergio Escalona, American baseball player
- Sergio Escobar (born 1974), Spanish track cyclist
- Sergio Escobedo (1931–2009), Mexican modern pentathlete and fencer
- Sergio Escudero (footballer, born 1983), Argentine footballer
- Sergio Escudero (footballer, born 1964), Argentine-Japanese footballer
- Sergio Escudero (footballer, born 1988), naturalized Japanese footballer
- Sergio Escudero Palomo (born 1989), Spanish footballer
- Sergio Esquenazi (born 1974), Argentine filmmaker
- Sergio y Estíbaliz (born 1948), Spanish singer
- Sergio Fachelli, Uruguayan singer and songwriter
- Sergio Fajardo, Colombian mathematician and politician
- Sergio Fantoni (1930–2020), Italian actor
- Sérgio Farias (born 1967), Brazilian football manager
- Sergio Fedee (born 1983), West Indian cricketer
- Sergio Macedo (born 1951), Brazilian comic artist
- Sergio Marqués Fernández (1946–2012), Spanish politician and lawyer
- Sergio Ferrara (born 1945), Italian physicist
- Sergio Ferrari (1943–2016), Italian footballer
- Sérgio Henrique Ferreira (1934–2016), Brazilian physician and pharmacologist
- Sergio Ferrer (born 1951), American baseball player
- Sérgio Ferro (born 1938), Brazilian painter, architect, and professor
- Sergio Gutiérrez Ferrol (born 1989), Spanish tennis player
- Sérgio Cabral Filho (born 1963), Brazilian politician and journalist
- Sérgio Paulo Nascimento Filho (born 1988), footballer
- Sergio Fiorentino (1927–1998), Italian pianist
- Sergio Flamigni (1925–2025), Italian politician and writer
- Sérgio Paranhos Fleury (1933–1979), Brazilian police deputy
- Sergio Floccari (born 1981), Italian footballer
- Sergio Flores (born 1985), Bolivian–American footballer
- Sergio Focardi, Italian physicist and professor
- Sergio Franchi (1926–1990), Italian tenor and actor
- Sergio Francisco (born 1979), Spanish footballer
- Sergio Frascoli (born 1936), Italian footballer
- Sergio Frusoni (1901–1975), Cape Verdean Creole-language poet
- Sergio Fubini (1928–2005), Italian theoretical physicist
- Sergio García de la Fuente (born 1983), Spanish footballer
- Sergio Furlan (born 1940), Italian Olympic sailor
- Sergio García, Spanish golfer
- Sergio González Soriano, Spanish footballer
- Sergio Gordilho (born 1970), Brazilian businessman and creative director
- Sergio Goyri (born 1958), Mexican actor
- Sergio Baris Gucciardo, Turkish footballer
- Sergio Hellings, Dutch footballer
- Sergio Hernández (racing driver) (born 1983), Spanish racing driver
- Sergio Hernández (basketball) (born 1963), Argentine basketball coach
- Sergio Hernández (actor) (born 1945), Chilean actor
- Sergio Jarlaz, Chilean singer
- Sergio Kindle, American football player
- Sergio Leone, Italian film director
- Sérgio Luiz (1921–1943), Portuguese cartoonist
- Sergio Marchionne, Italian businessman
- Sergio Marchisio (born 1949), Italian legal scholar
- Sergio Mariotti, Italian chess player
- Sergio Markarián, Uruguayan football manager
- Sergio Martínez (boxer), Argentine boxer
- Sergio Martino, Italian film director
- Sergio Massa (born 1972), Argentine politician
- Sergio Mattarella (born 1941), president of Italy since 2015
- Sergio Mena (born 1975), Spanish journalist and university professor
- Sérgio Mendes, Brazilian musician
- Sérgio Ministro, (born 1992), Portuguese footballer
- Sergio Mitre (born 1981), Mexican baseball player
- Sergio Momesso, Canadian ice hockey player
- Sergio Moraes (born 1982), Brazilian mixed martial artist and Jiu-Jitsu fighter
- Sergio Moreno (footballer, born 1992), Panamanian footballer
- Sergio Garrote Muñoz (born 1979), Spanish Para-cyclist
- Sergio Oliva, American bodybuilder
- Sergio Ortega (composer), Chilean composer and pianist
- Sergio Ortega (footballer, born 1990), Panamanian footballer
- Sergio Osmeña, president of the Philippines 1944–1946
- Sérgio Oulu (born 1993), Portuguese footballer
- Sergio Pamies (born 1983), Spanish jazz pianist, composer, and arranger
- Sergio Pellissier, Italian footballer
- Sergio Pérez (born 1990), Mexican racing driver
- Sergio Pérez (footballer, born 1988), Uruguayan footballer
- Sergio Amedeo Pignari, Italian scientist
- Sergio Pininfarina, Italian automobile designer
- Sergio Pizzorno, Guitarist and songwriter
- Sergio Ramos, Spanish footballer
- Sergio Renán, Argentine actor, director and screenwriter
- Sergio Rey, Spanish boxer
- Sergio Rodríguez, Spanish basketball player
- Sergio Roitman (born 1979), Argentine tennis player
- Sergio Jara Román (born 1981), Chilean journalist and non-fiction writer
- Sergio Romo, American baseball player
- Sergio Rosales, Venezuelan conductor
- Sergio Rossi (1935–2020), Italian fashion designer
- Sergio Rozenblat (born 1952), entrepreneur, law attorney, music advocate and artistic director
- Sergio Rubini, Italian actor and film director
- Sergio Santos (baseball), American baseball player
- Sergio Savarese, Italian furniture designer
- Sergio Scariolo, Italian basketball coach
- Sérgio Sette Câmara, Brazilian race car driver
- Sergio Sollima, Italian film director
- Sergio Stuparich (1943–2019), Chilean author and philosopher
- Sergio Tacchini, Italian fashion designer
- Sergio Tofano, Italian actor
- Sergio Torres (footballer, born 1981), Argentine footballer
- Sergio Troncoso (born 1961), American author of A Peculiar Kind of Immigrant's Son and The Last Tortilla and Other Stories
- Sergio Ulloa, American physicist
- Sergio Valenti, Argentine footballer
- Sergio Esteban Vélez (born 1983), Colombian writer, professor, and journalist
- Sérgio Vieira de Mello, Brazilian diplomat
- Sergio Villalobos, Chilean historian

=== List of people with given name Sergiu ===
- Sergiu Băhăian, Romanian businessman, convicted fraudster, alleged leader of a criminal organization
- Sergiu Balan (born 1987), Moldovan cross-country skier who has competed since 2006
- Sergiu Bar (born 1980), Romanian footballer
- Sergiu Brujan (born 1976), Romanian football player
- Sergiu Burcă (born 1961), journalist and politician from Moldova
- Sergiu Buș (born 1992), Romanian footballer
- Sergiu Celac (born 1939), the first post-communist Romanian Minister of Foreign Affairs of Romania
- Sergiu Celibidache (1912–1996), Romanian conductor, composer, and teacher
- Sergiu Chircă, Moldovan politician
- Sergiu Comissiona (1928–2005), Romanian conductor and violinist
- Sergiu Costea (born 1983), Romanian football player
- Sergiu Costin (born 1978), Romanian football player
- Sergiu Cunescu (1923–2005), Romanian social democratic politician, leader of the Social Democratic Party of Romania 1990 to 2001
- Sergiu Dan (1903–1976), Romanian novelist, journalist, Holocaust survivor and political prisoner of the communist regime
- Sergiu Gavriliţă, husband of Rodica Ciorănică (born 1976), who is a journalist and editor from Moldova
- Sergiu Grossu (1920–2009), writer and theologian from Romania
- Sergiu Hart (born 1949), Israeli mathematician and economist and the past president of the Game Theory Society (2008–2010)
- Sergiu Homei (born 1987), Romanian football player
- Sergiu Klainerman (born 1950), mathematician known for his contributions to the study of hyperbolic differential equations and general relativity
- Sergiu Luca (1943–2010), Romanian-born American violinist
- Sergiu Mândrean (born 1978), Romanian professional football player
- Sergiu Mocanu (June 6, 1961, Ciobalaccia) is a Moldovan politician
- Sergiu Ionuț Moga (born 1992), Romanian football defender
- Sergiu Musteaţă (born 1972), historian from the Republic of Moldova, president of the Association of Historians of Moldova
- Sergiu Muth (born 1990), Romanian footballer
- Sergiu Natra (1924–2021), Israeli composer of Romanian birth
- Sergiu Negruț (born 1993), Romanian professional football player
- Sergiu Nicolaescu (1930–2013), Romanian film director, actor and politician
- Sergiu Niţă (1883–1940), politician and lawyer from Romania
- Sergiu Rădăuţan (1926–1998), Moldovan physicist
- Sergiu Radu (born 1977), Romanian professional footballer
- Sergiu Samarian (1923–1991), Romanian–German chess master and coach
- Sergiu Suciu (born 1990), Romanian professional footballer
- Sergiu Toma (born 1987), Moldovan judoka
- Sergiu Ursu (born 1980), Romanian discus thrower

=== List of people with given name Serj ===
- Serj Sargsyan or Serzh Sargsyan (born 1954), third president of Armenia
- Serj Tankian, Armenian-American musician/political activist

== Fictional characters ==
- Serge, character in the Beverly Hills Cop movie franchise played by Bronson Pinchot
- Serge, the protagonist of Le Beau Serge, a French film directed by Claude Chabrol, released in 1958, and cited as the first movie of the Nouvelle Vague
- Serge, the silent protagonist of the role-playing video game Chrono Cross
- Serge, one of the main characters of the television series The Boys
- Serge Battour, one of the main characters of the manga series Kaze to Ki no Uta
- Serge A. Storms, the main character of a series of novels by Tim Dorsey
- Sergei Varishkov, alias Blanca, a Kazakh assassin in the manga and anime series Banana Fish
- Serge the Rabbit (Serge le lapin), mascot of the Paris metro transport network
- Sergey, a character in the fantasy novel Spinning Silver by Naomi Novik
- Sergey Roskov, a character in the anime series Stellvia
- Sergio, a parrot on the animated television series The Casagrandes
- Sergio Altieri, a protagonist in Five Nights at Freddy's, appearing in the book Five Nights at Freddy's: Fazbear Frights #8: Gumdrop Angel as the protagonist of the second story, Sergio's Lucky Day
- Sérgio, the main character of O Ateneu
- Sergei Kazarin, a character in the VOCALOID song series Parties are for Losers
- Sergiu Volda, a character in the game Papers, Please
- Sergei Illich, flight lead of Red Moon Squadron in Ace Combat: Assault Horizon

== See also ==
- Gens Sergia
- Sargis
- Sarkis (disambiguation)
- Serginho (disambiguation)
- Sergius (disambiguation)
- Sergejs, masculine Latvian given name
- Serhii, masculine Ukrainian given name
- Sergei, the Finnish military nickname for the ZU-23-2 air defense cannon
