= Sergio Fernández =

Sergio Fernández may refer to:

- Sergio Fernández Larraín (1909–1983), Chilean diplomat and politician
- Sergio Fernández Aguayo (born 1938), Chilean politician and diplomat
- Sergio Fernández Fernández (1939–2024), Chilean politician
- Sergio Fernández González (rower) (born 1967), Argentine rower
- Sergio Villanueva Fernández (born 1975), Spanish footballer
- Sergio Fernández (footballer, born 1975), Spanish footballer
- Sergio Fernández (footballer, born 1977), Spanish footballer
- Sergio Fernández (hurdler) (born 1993), Spanish hurdler
