= 2006–07 Campeonato Uruguayo Primera División =

104th season of the top-tier football league in Uruguay

Liga Profesional de Primera División
- Season: 2006–07
- Champions: Danubio (3rd title)

The 2006–07 Uruguayan Primera División season was the 104th season of the top division of football in Uruguay.

== Overview ==
It was contested by 16 teams, and Danubio won both the Apertura and Clausura championships.

== Apertura ==
Pos	Team	Pld	W	D	L	GF	GA	GD	Pts	Qualification or relegation
1	Danubio	15	11	1	3	36	17	+19	34	Championship playoff
2	Peñarol	15	10	2	3	30	18	+12	32	
3	Defensor Sporting	15	9	4	2	28	13	+15	31	
4	Bella Vista	15	10	1	4	25	15	+10	31	
5	Nacional	15	8	3	4	28	22	+6	27	
6	Montevideo Wanderers	15	8	3	4	22	18	+4	27	
7	Liverpool	15	6	4	5	24	20	+4	22	
8	Central Español	15	7	1	7	21	25	−4	22	
9	Tacuarembó	15	4	4	7	15	18	−3	16	
10	Rocha	15	4	3	8	15	21	−6	15	
11	River Plate	15	4	3	8	15	25	−10	15	
12	Miramar Misiones	15	3	5	7	17	26	−9	14	
13	Cerrito	15	4	4	7	16	21	−5	13 (Note: 3 points deducted?)	
14	Progreso	15	3	4	8	16	31	−15	13	
15	Rampla Juniors	15	3	3	9	15	23	−8	12	
16	Rentistas	15	1	5	9	13	23	−10	8	

Source: RSSSF

== Clausura ==
Pos	Team	Pld	W	D	L	GF	GA	GD	Pts	Qualification or relegation
1	Danubio	15	10	2	3	26	10	+16	32	Clausura tiebreaker
2	Peñarol	15	9	5	1	34	20	+14	32	Clausura tiebreaker
3	Defensor Sporting	15	8	4	3	29	19	+10	28	
4	Montevideo Wanderers	15	8	2	5	31	21	+10	26	
5	River Plate	15	5	6	4	26	22	+4	21	
6	Tacuarembó	15	4	8	3	25	21	+4	20	
7	Bella Vista	15	6	2	7	23	23	0	20	
8	Liverpool	15	6	2	7	23	24	−1	20	
9	Miramar Misiones	15	6	2	7	19	20	−1	20	
10	Rampla Juniors	15	5	5	5	20	24	−4	20	
11	Progreso	15	4	6	5	22	21	+1	18	
12	Nacional	15	5	3	7	14	22	−8	18	
13	Rentistas	15	4	4	7	20	28	−8	16	
14	Rocha	15	5	1	9	9	23	−14	16	
15	Central Español	15	3	3	9	10	23	−13	12	
16	Cerrito	15	2	5	8	17	27	−10	11	

Source: RSSSF

=== Clausura tiebreaker ===
Since Danubio and Peñarol ended up tied in points for first place, an additional match was played by both teams to decide the Torneo Clausura winners.

17 May 2007

Danubio	1–1 (a.e.t.)	Peñarol
Ricard 81'	Report	Arévalo Ríos 65'
Penalties
I. González (penalty scored); Lima (penalty missed); Jadson (penalty scored); Gargano (penalty missed); Mena (penalty scored); Conde (penalty scored)	4–3	Silvio Mendes (penalty scored); Mozzo (penalty scored); D. Rodríguez (penalty missed); S. García (penalty missed); Franco (penalty scored); S. Pérez (penalty missed)

Estadio Centenario, Montevideo
Attendance: 40,000
Referee: Jorge Larrionda

Danubio qualified to championship playoff as Clausura winners.

== Aggregate table ==
Pos	Team	Pld	W	D	L	GF	GA	GD	Pts	Qualification or relegation
1	Danubio	30	21	3	6	62	27	+35	66	Qualify to Liguilla
2	Peñarol	30	19	7	4	64	38	+26	64	Qualify to Liguilla
3	Defensor Sporting	30	17	8	5	57	32	+25	59	Qualify to Liguilla
4	Montevideo Wanderers	30	16	5	9	53	39	+14	53	Qualify to Liguilla
5	Bella Vista	30	16	3	11	48	38	+10	51	Qualify to Liguilla
6	Nacional	30	13	6	11	42	44	−2	45	Qualify to Liguilla
7	Liverpool	30	12	6	12	47	44	+3	42	
8	Tacuarembó	30	8	12	10	40	39	+1	36	
9	River Plate	30	9	9	12	41	47	−6	36	
10	Miramar Misiones	30	9	7	14	36	46	−10	34	
11	Central Español	30	10	4	16	31	48	−17	34	
12	Rampla Juniors	30	8	8	14	35	47	−12	32	
13	Progreso	30	7	10	13	38	52	−14	31	Relegation Playoff
14	Rocha	30	9	4	17	24	44	−20	31	Relegation Playoff
15	Cerrito	30	6	9	15	33	48	−15	24 (Note: 3 points deducted?)	Relegated
16	Rentistas	30	5	9	16	33	51	−18	24	Relegated

Source: RSSSF

== Championship playoff ==
No championship playoff matches were needed as Danubio won both Apertura and Clausura.

Primera División
2006–07 Champions
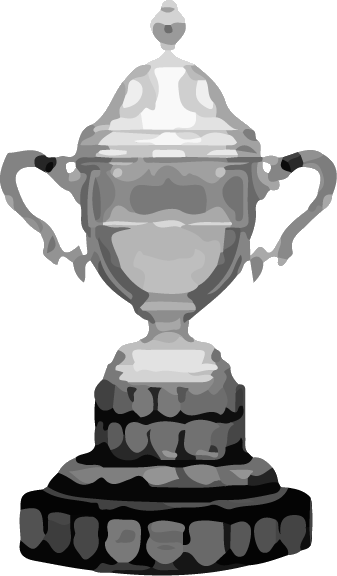

3rd title

== Relegation playoff ==
20 May 2007

Rocha	0–2	Progreso
		J. Ramirez 47'; N. Silva 66'

Estadio Doctor Mario Sobrero, Rocha
27 May 2007

Progreso	3–0	Rocha
M. Crossa 61' 78'; M. Riquero 70'

Estadio Parque Paladino, Montevideo

Progreso won 5–0 on aggregate and stayed in the top division.

Rocha were relegated along Cerro and Rentistas.

== Liguilla Pre-Libertadores ==
Pos	Team	Pld	W	D	L	GF	GA	GD	Pts	Qualification or relegation
1	Nacional	5	4	0	1	10	5	+5	12	Copa Libertadores group stage
2	Montevideo Wanderers	5	3	1	1	12	9	+3	10	Copa Libertadores first stage
3	Danubio	5	3	1	1	5	3	+2	10	Copa Sudamericana
4	Defensor Sporting	5	2	1	2	3	3	0	7	Copa Sudamericana
5	Peñarol	5	0	2	3	3	6	−3	2	
6	Bella Vista	5	0	1	4	4	11	−7	1	

Updated to match(es) played on unknown. Source:
