= Serhii =

Serhii (Ukrainian: Сергій [serˈɦij]) is a Ukrainian masculine given name that comes from the ancient Roman generic name Sergius. Other transliterations of the name include Sergiy, Serhiy, Sergii, and Serhij. Notable people with this name include:

- Sergii Semeno (born 1990), footballer
- Sergiy Bezugliy (born 1984), sprint canoer
- Sergiy Bychkov (born 1961), politician, civil engineer, and lawyer
- Sergiy Gladyr (born 1988), professional basketball player
- Sergiy Gorbenko (born 1985), professional basketball player
- Sergiy Grechyn (born 1979), professional road cyclist
- Sergiy Klimniuk (born 1976), sprint canoer
- Sergiy Korsunsky (born 1962), diplomat
- Sergiy Kulyk (born 1958), diplomat
- Sergiy Kyslytsya (born 1969), former Ukrainian diplomat and politician
- Sergiy Lagkuti (born 1985), racing cyclist
- Sergiy Matveyev (born 1975), former professional road bicycle racer
- Sergiy Sergeyev (footballer) (born 1982), footballer
- Sergiy Stakhovsky (born 1986), professional tennis player
- Sergiy Verigin (1868–1938) Russian Orthodox clergyman, converted to Catholicism
- Sergiy Vilkomir (1956–2020), computer scientist
- Serhii Konoval (1992–2024), Ukrainian public activist, paramedic, soldier
- Serhii Plokhy (born 1968), historian
- Serhii Romaniuk (born 1995), Paralympic Nordic skier
- Serhiy Aleksanov (born 1990), Ukrainian football striker
- Serhiy Biloushchenko (born 1981), rower
- Serhiy Breus (born 1983), butterfly swimmer
- Serhiy Demchuk (born 19??), paralympic swimmer
- Serhiy Dzyndzyruk (born 1976), professional boxer
- Serhiy Ivlyev (born 1984), footballer
- Serhiy Kolos (born 19??), paralympic athlete
- Serhiy Kyrychenko (born 1952), army general
- Serhiy Olizarenko (1954–2024), steeplechase runner
- Serhiy Osovych (born 1973), sprinter
- Serhiy Petrov (1997–2026), footballer
- Serhiy Potimkov (1954–2025), politician
- Serhiy Shevchenko (1908–200?), politician and diplomat
- Serhiy Shvets (footballer) (born 1992), footballer
- Serhiy Shvets (politician) (1976–2025), politician
- Serhiy Tretyak (born 1984), footballer
- Serhiy Zhadan (born 1974), writer, musician, translator, and social activist
- Serhiy Zhuravlyov (1959–2025), footballer

== See also ==
- Sergius (name)
