= Sergejs =

Sergejs is a masculine Latvian given name. Notable people with the name include:

- Sergejs Boldaveško (born 1970), Latvian ice hockey player
- Sergejs Dolgopolovs (born 1941), Latvian politician
- Sergejs Fjodorovs (born 1956), Latvian politician
- Sergejs Inšakovs (born 1971), Latvian sprinter
- Sergejs Kožans (born 1986), Latvian footballer
- Sergejs Maģers (1912–1989), Latvian footballer
- Sergejs Mirskis (born 1952), Latvian politician
- Sergejs Naumovs (born 1969), Latvian ice hockey player
- Sergejs Pečura (born 1987), Latvian ice hockey player
- Sergejs Potapkins (born 1977), Latvian politician
- Sergejs Semjonovs (born 1959), Latvian footballer and manager
- Sergejs Seņins (born 1972), Latvian ice hockey player
- Sergejs Žoltoks (1972–2004), Latvian ice hockey player

== See also ==
- Sergius (name)
