= Sergio Villanueva =

Sergio Villanueva may refer to:

- Sergio Villanueva (footballer) (born 1975), Spanish footballer
- Sergio Villanueva (boxer) (born 1988), Mexican boxer
