= Sergio Pérez (disambiguation) =

Sergio Pérez (born 1990) is a Mexican racing driver.

Sergio Pérez may also refer to:

- Sergio Arturo Perez (born 1968), Cuban Paralympic judoka
- Sergio Pérez (baseball) (born 1984), Minor League baseball pitcher
- Sergio Pérez Pérez (born 1984), Spanish tennis player
- Sergio Pérez (footballer, born 1986), Mexican footballer
- Sergio Pérez (footballer, born 1988), Uruguayan footballer
- Sergio Pérez (footballer, born 1993), Spanish footballer
- Sergio Pérez (footballer, born 1997), Spanish footballer
- Sergio Pérez Hormazábal (fl. 1980s), Chilean economist and public official
- Sergio Pérez Betancourt, Venezuelan violinist with Adrenalina Caribe
