= Sergio Díaz =

Sergio Díaz may refer to:

- Sergio Díaz (footballer, born 1956), Argentine football forward
- Sergio Díaz (footballer, born 1985), Spanish football defender
- Sergio Díaz (footballer, born 1991), Spanish football defender
- Sergio Díaz (footballer, born 1998), Paraguayan football forward
- Sergio Díaz (sound editor) (born 1969), Mexican sound editor
- Sergio Díaz-Granados Guida (born 1968), Colombian politician
