= Sergio Sánchez =

Sergio Sánchez may refer to:

- Sergio Sánchez Hernández (born 1968), Spanish paralympic athlete
- Sergio Sánchez (sport shooter) (born 1970), Guatemalan Olympic sport shooter
- Sergio G. Sánchez (born 1973), Spanish director and screenwriter
- Sergio Sánchez (footballer, born 1977), former Spanish football goalkeeper
- Sergio Sánchez (runner) (born 1982), Spanish long-distance runner
- Sergio Sánchez (footballer, born 1986), Spanish football defender
- Sergio Sánchez (footballer, born 1995), Spanish football forward

== See also ==
- Sergio S. Morán (born 1984), Spanish webcartoonist born Sergio Sánchez Morán
