= Sergio González =

Sergio González or Gonzalez may refer to:

- Sergio González (sailor) (1925–2017), Mexican sailor
- Sergio Gonzalez (wrestler) (born 1947), American former wrestler
- Sergio González Rodríguez (1950–2017), Mexican journalist
- Sergio González Morales (born 1952), better known as "Tilo", Chilean composer
- Sergio González García (born 1955), Mexican politician
- Sergio González (footballer, born 1961), Argentine footballer
- Sergio González (footballer, born 1976), Spanish former footballer and manager of the Catalonia national team
- Sergio González (beach volleyball) (born 1990), Cuban beach volleyballer
- Sergio González (footballer, born 1992), Spanish footballer
- Sergio González (footballer, born 1995), Argentine footballer
- Sergio González (footballer, born 1997), Spanish footballer

See also:

- Sergio Boris (footballer) (born 1980), Spanish footballer born Sergio Boris González Monteagudo
- Sergi González (born 1995), Spanish footballer
