= Sergio Ciattaglia =

Argentine footballer (born 1967)

Personal information
- Date of birth: 10 June 1967 (age 59)
- Place of birth: Cañada de Gómez, Argentina
- Position: Goalkeeper

Senior career*
Years	Team	Apps	(Gls)
1988–1991	Rosario Central		
1991	Cobreloa		
1992–1993	Argentino de Rosario		
1995–1997	Central Córdoba	58	(0)
1997–2000	Olimpo de Bahía Blanca	66	(0)
2000–2001	Juventud Antoniana	3	(0)
2001–2004	Cipolletti	43	(0)
2004	Alianza de Cutral Có	8	(0)
2005–2008	Independiente de Neuquén	54	(0)
- * Club domestic league appearances and goals

Sergio Ciattaglia (born 10 June 1967) is an Argentine former professional footballer who played as a goalkeeper for clubs of Argentina and Chile.
