= Serge Toussaint =

American artist

Serge Toussaint is an artist and muralist. He was born in Haiti, grew up in Carrefour, Haiti until the age of 12. He moved to Corona, Queens, New York with his father. Here he went to high school and graduated with his high school diploma. He worked in New York for some time working often on his own artwork and earning a wage from jobs such as being a busboy at Sizzler. He and his family took a vacation to Florida one winter and it was during this vacation he decided to stay in Miami and work on his career as an artist. Serge currently resides (2010) in Miami, Florida, and states he is unsure how many signs and murals he has done although it is surely in the hundreds if not the thousands. He claims he was an artist at age 12 and the only lessons in art he had were during his required art class in high school. Serge Toussaint has four children. His mother died in 2009. Serge states that he had a past of doing things wrong, however he states he is now married and spends his time painting and enjoys spending his time doing rara lakay.

Serge has been painting in Miami for decades but the 2008 Obama Presidential election brought attention to his work. Serge paints large murals (larger than 5x5). During the 2008 presidential election Serge painted several murals of Barack Obama in the Little Haiti and Liberty City areas of Miami-Dade Florida. His murals are easily recognized because he signs his name to each mural. His signature most often reads Serge with the S being a dollar sign. News reports covered Serge because one of his murals was commissioned through a state agency. This particular mural was painted under interstate I-95 and Serge painted Martin Luther King Jr. alongside Obama. According to Serge he was asked to remove the Obama portion of the mural due to government monies not being allocated for political endorsement purposes. Serge complied, and the news outlets covered the story. Serge is best known for his signature mural of the Miami Heat where he worked for just over two years and received $546,000.

Since the 2008 presidential election has subsided, Serge still continues to paint notable figures and make signs for Miami-Dade neighborhoods. Serge states he loves living in Miami and is grateful to have a community of Haitians to whom he easily relates. Serge has stated that he recognizes many of the problems of Haiti (pre-2010 earthquake) and states the government is largely to blame, but he is not political and only wishes that there is more equality between the very wealthy of Haiti and the very poor of Haiti.

== Bibliography ==
- Video taped interview with Serge Toussaint 2009/2010 by Rachel Goldberg
