= Sergey Sangalov =

Russian contemporary artist (born 1959)

- Born: 1959 (age 66–67); Sukhumi, Abkhazia
- Citizenship: Russian
- Education: Rostov State Pedagogical Institute
- Known for: Painter

Sergey Sangalov (born 1959) is a Russian contemporary artist. Born in Sukhumi in the former USSR and now capital of Abkhazia, he trained in Rostov and is an abstract painter.

== Life and training ==
Sangalov was born in Sukhumi, a small town in the Black Sea coast region, in what was the former USSR and now Abkhazia. He was a single child of Vladimir Sangalov and Claudia, who were both Russian. His mother worked as an accountant and his father was a driver in Sukhumi. Sergey painted and illustrated as a child before attending Rostov State Pedagogical Institute, specialising in arts and graphics. After graduating in 1982, he began exhibiting his work at the age of 24, when his first exhibition was held in the National Gallery of Sukhumi. After serving in the army for a short time, the artist went on and continues to exhibit extensively in Russia, Europe and North America.

== Art ==
Sangalov has worked primarily as a painter and has developed an abstract, Post-expressionist style that focuses on depicting nature, folklore and spirituality. He has cited as influences the Dutch-American abstract expressionist painter Willem de Kooning, Russian born Mark Rothko and American Barnett Newman.

Artworks by Sangalov are held by Moscow Museum of Modern Art, Hofstra Museum and Tbilisi Museum of Modern Art. Between 1982 and 2013, Sangalov held 12 solo exhibitions and participated in at least 48 group exhibitions. His art can be found in many museums and private collections in Russia, USA, Germany, France, Poland, Georgia and Abkhazia.

In 2006, Sangalov was artistic director for a play based on Hristo Boytchev's The Colonel Bird, staged at the Russian Dramatic Theatre, Sukhumi.

He has had three key phases or bodies of work in his career to date:

Spooks (1988–1996)

This series of over 100 paintings draw on the theme of his personal childhood memories and wonder for life in his young consciousness. The series includes paintings of the sea, the night, angels and phantoms.

Masks (1996–2002)

Over 50 abstract oil on canvas works that extend in theme from his Spooks series. Key paintings include Mask of a Grasshopper (2000–01) and Mask Shadow (2000)

Still Life (2002–2012)

Some 26 oil on canvas paintings that depict Sangalov's abstract representation of some of the world's oldest and most iconic monuments, monolithic statues and stones of worship. The artist explores the realm of possibilities, such as what these structures mean to us in our present age and why these assumed ‘dead’ masses are very much alive.

== Administration ==
Sangalov has been active in arts organisations and has served in the Union of Artists of the USSR since 1985 and the Moscow Union of Artists since 1995. However Sangalov is better known for his reclusive stance as a painter, believing the artist should prefer to find meaning and belonging in the state of the creative process itself. [1]

== Major collections ==
• Moscow Museum of Modern Art [1] • M’Ars Centre for Contemporary Arts (Russia) [1] • Sukhumi Picture Gallery (Abkhazia) [1] • Tbilisi Museum of Modern Art (Georgia) [1] • Tbilisi Picture Gallery (Georgia) [1] • Russian Foundation for Contemporary Art "SAUPRA" (Russia)[1] • Hofstra Museum (USA) [1] • Art Museum of Duke University (USA) [1]

== See also ==
•
