= Sérgio Luiz =

- Born: 1921; Portugal
- Died: 1943 (aged 21–22)
- Known for: Cartoonist, creator of Boneco Rebelde
- Notable work: Boneco Rebelde
- Relatives: Guy Manuel (brother)

Sérgio Luiz (1921–1943) was a Portuguese cartoonist.

Luiz worked on the magazine O Papagaio in 1938, and in 1939 the magazine published the first adventure of his character pt:Boneco Rebelde. The cartoon was instantly popular. In 1941, Boneco Rebelde was made into an animated film, one of the first in Portugal. The film was shown in the Cinema Jardim and Cinema Europa in Lisbon.

With his younger brother Guy Manuel, Luiz he also published other works in Pim Pam Pum!, Faísca, Acção Infantil, and Engenhocas.

Luiz died of tuberculosis in 1943.
