= Sergio Stuparich =

Chilean author and philosopher (1943–2019)

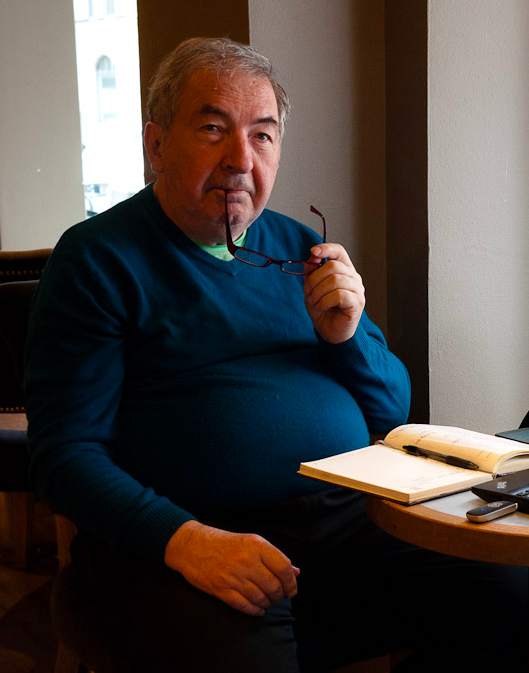
- Sergio Stuparich in Malmö, 2014
- Born: Sergio Eduardo Stuparich Clementi; 14 December 1943; Santiago, Chile
- Died: September 11, 2019 (aged 75); Malmö, Sweden
- Citizenship: Chilean, Swedish, Italian
- Occupations: Philosopher, Teacher, Author
- Children: Ivo Stuparich; Andro Stuparich; Tamara Stuparich De La Barra
- Writing career
- Language: Spanish, English, Swedish, Italian, Latin
- Genres: Essay, Memoir, Novel
- Notable work: El Pensamiento del Siglo XXI (2012)

Sergio Eduardo Stuparich Clementi (born December 14, 1943) was a Chilean author and philosopher descending from Italian immigrants from the Adriatic island of Lussin, Croatia.

== Biography and career ==
Stuparich was born and raised in the capital Santiago. An alumni at the Pontifical Catholic University of Chile and the University of Chile, he worked as a philosophy teacher at Santiago University of Technology (now Usach) before the 1973 military coup. At the same time, he was active in the Socialist Party and was therefore forced to put himself in safety at Italy's embassy when the military took over. In the meantime, he wrote the novel Chile: Comprometerse con una clase, which was published later in exile.

After 1973, Stuparich was exiled in Italy, where he continued to teach and obtained a PhD qualification, Dottore in Filosofia from the University of Turin. Stuparich had three children with Teresa De La Barra: Ivo, Andro and Tamara.

During his time in Sweden, Sergio Stuparich undertook research at the Master level in Theoretical Philosophy at Lund University. He also produced the selection of the anthology Uppbrott (1982) and Vote from Latin America (1986), followed by books on Philosophy, Del Homo al Hombre (2011) and El Pensamiento del Siglo XXI (2012), and two memoirs, La Guarida (2008) and Exilio Italiano (2016).

Sergio Stuparich died on the 11th of September 2019 in Malmö, Sweden, after a brave and long-drawn battle with cancer, and is terribly missed by his family and all those who loved him.

== Works ==
- Señas Personales: Ninguna - Chile 1970-1973.
- Wer uns nich kennt, kennt Chile nicht, Berlin, 1975.
- Chileense lente, Baarn, 1977.
- Chileense lente, Antwerp, 1978.
- Tusind stierner over Chile, Copenhague, 1978.
- Den som inte känner oss, känner inte Chile, Stockholm, 1979.
- Különös Ismertetöjele Nincs, Budapest, 1981.
- Häxkonster, Stockholm, 1981.
- Uppbrott, Stockholm, 1982.
- Situaciones, Lund, 1982.
- Roster fran Latinoamérica, Stockholm, 1984.
- Fast Baltet, script for Malmö TV, 1992.
- La Guarida - Memorias Iconoclastas, Santiago de Chile, 2008.
- Cocodrilo-Yo, 2010.
- Del Homo al Hombre, 2011.
- El Pensamiento del Siglo XXI, 2012.
- Exilio Italiano, 2016.

== Awards ==
- Twice winner of CRAV Cultural Prize, Chile.
