= Serge Malé =

French UN Official

Serge Malé, a national of France, is a senior UN official working for the Office of the United Nations High Commissioner for Refugees. Since 2006, he is head of the UNHCR office in Chad.

In 2008, in the aftermath of February's Battle of N'Djamena, he was notable for his role in the response to the outflow of Chadian refugees to neighbouring Cameroon, and called for them to return as soon as security in Chad was re-established.
