= Sergio Rodríguez (disambiguation) =

Sergio Rodríguez (born 1986) is a Spanish basketball player.

Sergio Rodríguez may also refer to:

- Sergio Rodríguez (footballer, born 1928), Uruguayan footballer
- Sergio Rodríguez (footballer, born 1978), Spanish footballer
- Sergio Rodríguez (footballer, born January 1985), Uruguayan footballer
- Sergio Rodríguez (footballer, born August 1985), Mexican footballer
- Sergio Rodríguez (footballer, born 1989), Spanish footballer
- Sergio Rodríguez (footballer, born 1992), Spanish footballer
- Sergio Rodríguez (footballer, born May 1995), Mexican footballer
- Sergio Rodríguez (footballer, born November 1995), Mexican footballer
- Sergio Rodríguez (cyclist) (born 1995), Spanish cyclist

== See also ==
- Rodri (footballer, born 1984), Spanish footballer born Sergio Rodríguez García
