= Sergio Gordilho =

- Born: May 16, 1970 (age 55); Brazil
- Education: Universidade Federal da Bahia, Royal College of Art – London, Berlin School of Creative Leadership
- Occupations: Co- president and Chief Creative Officer of Agência Africa, Partner of ABC Group - Grupo ABC

Sergio Gordilho (born May 16, 1970), is a businessman and creative director. Gordilho is co-president and chief creative officer of Africa agency, one of the ten largest advertising agency (agencies) in Brazil and a partner of Grupo ABC, the largest communications holding company in Latin America.

== Career ==
Gordilho graduated from the Federal University of Bahia with a degree in architecture. He also has a graduate degree in Graphic Design from Royal College of Art in London and an MBA (Master Business Administration) from Berlin School of Creative Leadership.

He began his career as a creative professional working in advertising agencies such as Chavo del 8 and SLAP, in Salvador, his home city. Gordilho lived in London for over a year where he got a graduate degree in Graphic Design from the Royal College of Art. In 1999, he moved to São Paulo to work at DM9DDB, where he met his future partner, Nizan Guanaes. Between 2000 and 2002, he worked in Bates Brasil, the nowadays Y&R (Young and Rubicam).

In December 2002, Gordilho founded Africa, with partners Nizan Guanaes, Marcio Santoro, Luiz Fernando Vieira and Olivia Machado. According to 2014 statistics, Africa is the seventh largest advertising agency in Brazil and belongs to ABC Group, the largest communications holding company in Latin America.

Gordilho was named co-president of Agencia Africa, alongside Márcio Santoro in 2010. Under his leadership, the agency is responsible for the communication of brands such as Itaú, Brahma, Vivo, Procter & Gamble, Folha de S.Paulo.

== Recognition ==
Under his leadership in the creative field, Africa won the Caboré award, a Brazilian communications industry award for Communication Agency in 2005 and 2012.

Gordilho was voted the most influential Creative Professional by the Association of Advertising Professionals in 2006.

Two years later, in 2008, he won the Caboré award again, this time for Creative Professional. From 2008 to 2014, Africa was voted the most admired advertising agency by Carta Capital magazine.

In 2014, Gordilho was the only Brazilian voted as “Agency Innovator” appointed by The Internationalist, an international organization that chooses main executives of advertising worldwide. His indication occurred for his work in Itaú Bank’ commercials during the 2014 FIFA World Cup and the creation of Africa Lab, an intern creative laboratory, responsible for developing projects and products such as Buddy Cup, for Budweiser.
