= Sergei Zelenov =

Russian footballer

Personal information
- Full name: Sergei Valeryevich Zelenov
- Date of birth: 10 October 1980 (age 46)
- Place of birth: Barnaul, Russian SFSR
- Height: 1.74 m (5 ft 8 1/2 in)
- Positions: Midfielder; forward

Youth career
- Temp Barnaul
- Polimer Barnaul

Senior career*
Years	Team	Apps	(Gls)
1998	FC Neftyanik Pokhvistnevo	21	(2)
1999–2001	FC Metallurg Krasnoyarsk	35	(2)
2001	FC Metallurg-Zapsib Novokuznetsk	11	(0)
2002	FC Kolomna	36	(1)
2003–2005	FC Metallurg Krasnoyarsk	52	(4)
2005–2007	FC Dynamo Barnaul	66	(2)
2008	FC Amur Blagoveshchensk	23	(0)
2009–2013	FC Dynamo Barnaul	91	(5)
- * Club domestic league appearances and goals

Sergei Valeryevich Zelenov (Russian: Серге́й Валерьевич Зеленов; born 10 October 1980) is a former Russian professional football player.

== Club career ==
He played two seasons in the Russian Football National League for FC Metallurg Krasnoyarsk.
