= Serge Mayifuila =

Serge Mayifuila is a Congolese-born business owner, philanthropist and a father of one child. He studied Mechanical Engineering at the University of Maryland, Baltimore County. He owns congoglobal.com and is a member of Arche de L'Unite and APEMA, two Congolese NGOs.
