= Sérgio Júnior =

Sérgio Júnior may refer to:

- Sérgio Júnior (footballer) (born 1979), born (1979), Brazilian footballer
- Sergio Junior (gymnast) (born 1992), Brazilian gymnast

== See also ==
- Sergio Benvindo Junior (born 1989), Swedish contemporary dancer
- Sérgio Dutra Júnior (born 1988), Brazilian footballer
- Sérgio Manoel Júnior (born 1972), Brazilian footballer
