= Sergio Torres =

Sergio Torres may refer to:

== People ==
- Sergio Torres Félix (born 1966), Mexican politician
- Sergio Torres (footballer, born 1981), Argentine footballer
- Sergio Torres (footballer, born 1984), Spanish footballer
- Sergio Torres Torres, Puerto Rican mayor

== Other uses ==
- Sergio Torres Stadium, football stadium in El Salvador for C.D. Luis Ángel Firpo
