= Sergei Ivanovich Vasiliev =

Sergei Vasiliev Ivanovich
- Born: 1961 (age 64–65); St. Petersburg, Russia
- Education: Admiral Makarov State Maritime Academy in St. Petersburg, Russia
- Occupations: Businessman, head of Soyuz Corporation

Sergei Ivanovich Vasiliev (in Russian: Сергей Иванович Васильев; born in 1961 in St. Petersburg, Russia) is a member company of the Guild of Purveyors to the Kremlin and owner of Soyuz Corporation.

== Early life and education ==
Sergei Vasiliev was educated at the Admiral Makarov State Maritime Academy in St. Petersburg, Russia, which trains specialists to serve on the civil and commercial fleet.

== Career ==
=== Business ===
Sergei Ivanovich Vasiliev began his career in December 1987 at "Мorskaya Chayka" (Seagull) Corporation. Between 1987 and 2000, he created and headed a number of companies, the majority of which dealt with the import and trade of food commodities. In 2002, Vasiliev established the Soyuz Corporation, which bears the stamp of the Official Purveyor to the Moscow Kremlin and is a leading producer of special-purpose fats for the Russian food industry.

=== Political ===
In 2009, Sergei Vasiliev was appointed President of the Guild.

== Awards ==
Sergei Vasiliev has received numerous awards from Russian officials and religious figures. He has been awarded the Highest Public Award of the Russian Federation for the wealth and propensity of Russia in the sphere of food production. Additionally, he has received the prestigious order badge from the Russian Orthodox Church.
