= Sergio Escudero =

Sergio Escudero may also refer to:

- Sergio Escudero (footballer, born 1964), Argentine-Japanese footballer
- Sergio Escudero (footballer, born 1983), Argentine footballer
- Sergio Escudero (footballer, born 1988), Japanese footballer
- Sergio Escudero (footballer, born 1989), Spanish footballer
