= Sergio Abreu =

Sergio or Sérgio Abreu may refer to:

- Sergio Abreu (politician) (born 1945), Uruguayan politician
- Sérgio Abreu (footballer) (born 1967), French footballer who played as a defender
- Sérgio Abreu (actor) (born 1975), Brazilian actor
