= Sergio Campana =

Sergio Campana may refer to:

- Sergio Campana (footballer) (1934–2025), Italian footballer and lawyer
- Sergio Campana (astrophysicist) (born 1965), Italian astrophysicist
- Sergio Campana (racing driver) (born 1986), Italian automobile racing driver
