= Serge Kwetche =

Cameroonian footballer (born 1976)

Serge Kwetche (born 5 November 1976) was a Cameroonian footballer in midfielder role.

He was initially selected by the Cameroon national football team for the 1998 FIFA World Cup, but due to injury he was replaced by Patrice Abanda before the tournament.
