= Sergio Marchisio =

Italian legal scholar

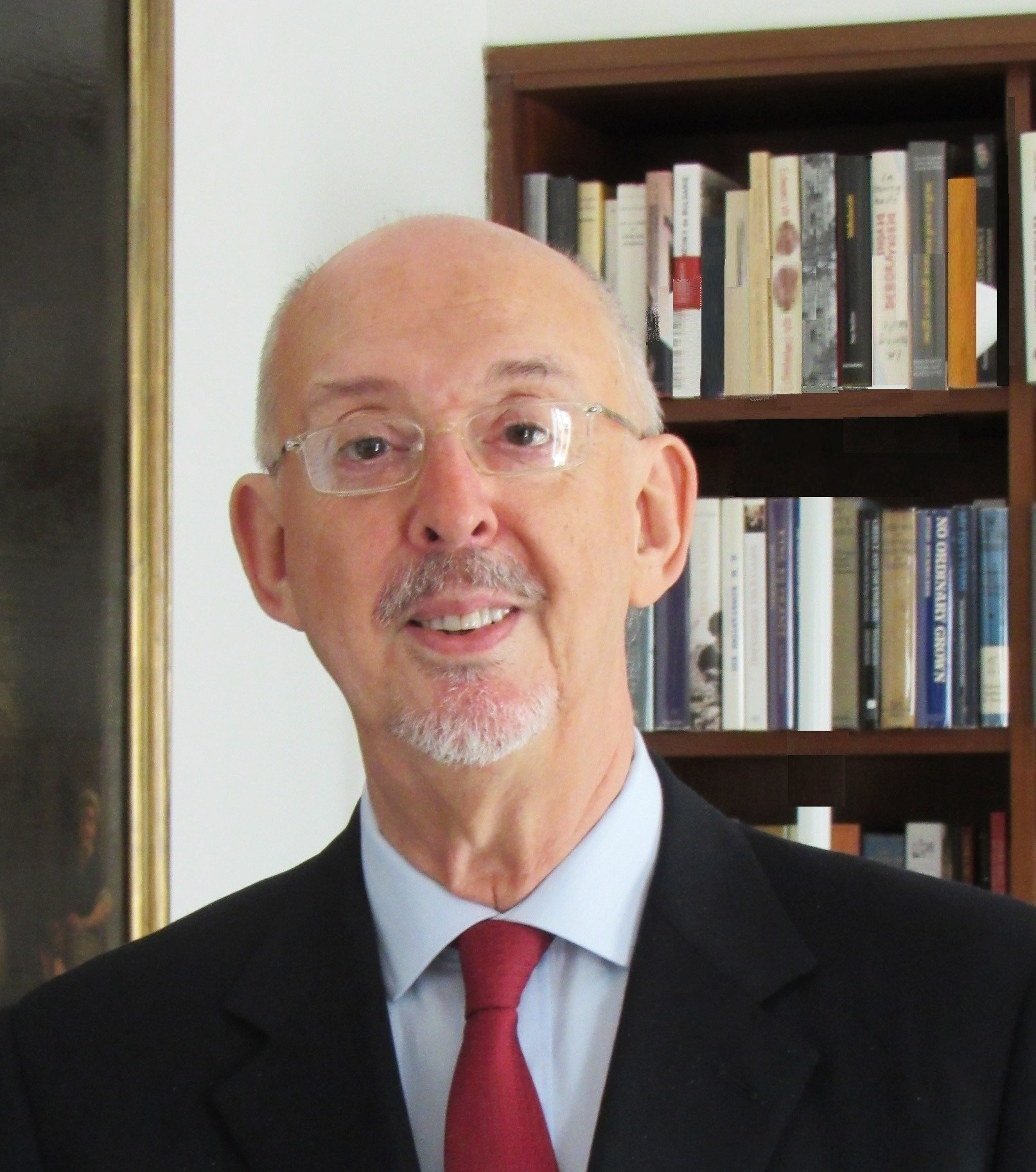
Prof. Sergio Marchisio

Sergio Marchisio (born 1949) is a full professor at Sapienza University of Rome. He also serves as an expert legal consultant for the Italian Ministry of Foreign Affairs and as a delegate to various international organizations and conferences.

Throughout his career, he has conducted comprehensive legal studies, which embrace numerous areas of international and European law. The examination of international legal practice and the behaviour of states has a central role in his scientific research. He has often been involved in law-making processes leading to the creation of international legal norms.

== Education and academic career ==
Marchisio began his academic career as assistant professor and chargé de cours of international law at the Universities of Florence and Camerino. In 1979, he became a full professor at the University of Perugia. In 1997 he was appointed a full professor at Sapienza University. From 1995 to 2015, Marchisio taught European Union Law at LUISS Guido Carli University of Rome.

Since 1998, he has been a member of the scientific board of the Sapienza's Ph.D. in Public, Comparative, and International Law. He is also the director of the 2nd Level Master's Course in International Protection of Human Rights (2007–present). Since 2014, he has been a member of the academic board of the Sapienza School for Advanced Studies (SSAS).

He has been invited to give keynote lectures and speeches to several national and foreign universities. In 2016, he taught Les activités spatiales internationales entre droit public et droit privé at The Hague Academy of International Law.

== Scientific contribution ==
Throughout his scientific career, Marchisio has thoroughly examined several topics in international law. His general scientific approach follows the model of normativism, having studied it with leading experts, alongside the prompt verification of international practice.

He has contributed to the study of Italian treaty-making power and the identification of the conditional norms required for an autonomous power of the government to conclude agreements in simplified form, which was not expressly provided by Italy's written Constitution of 1948. A typical case of the exercise of the governmental power to conclude agreements in simplified form was that of the conventional regime regarding military bases located in foreign territory under international law, including the practice concerning the conclusion of secret treaties.

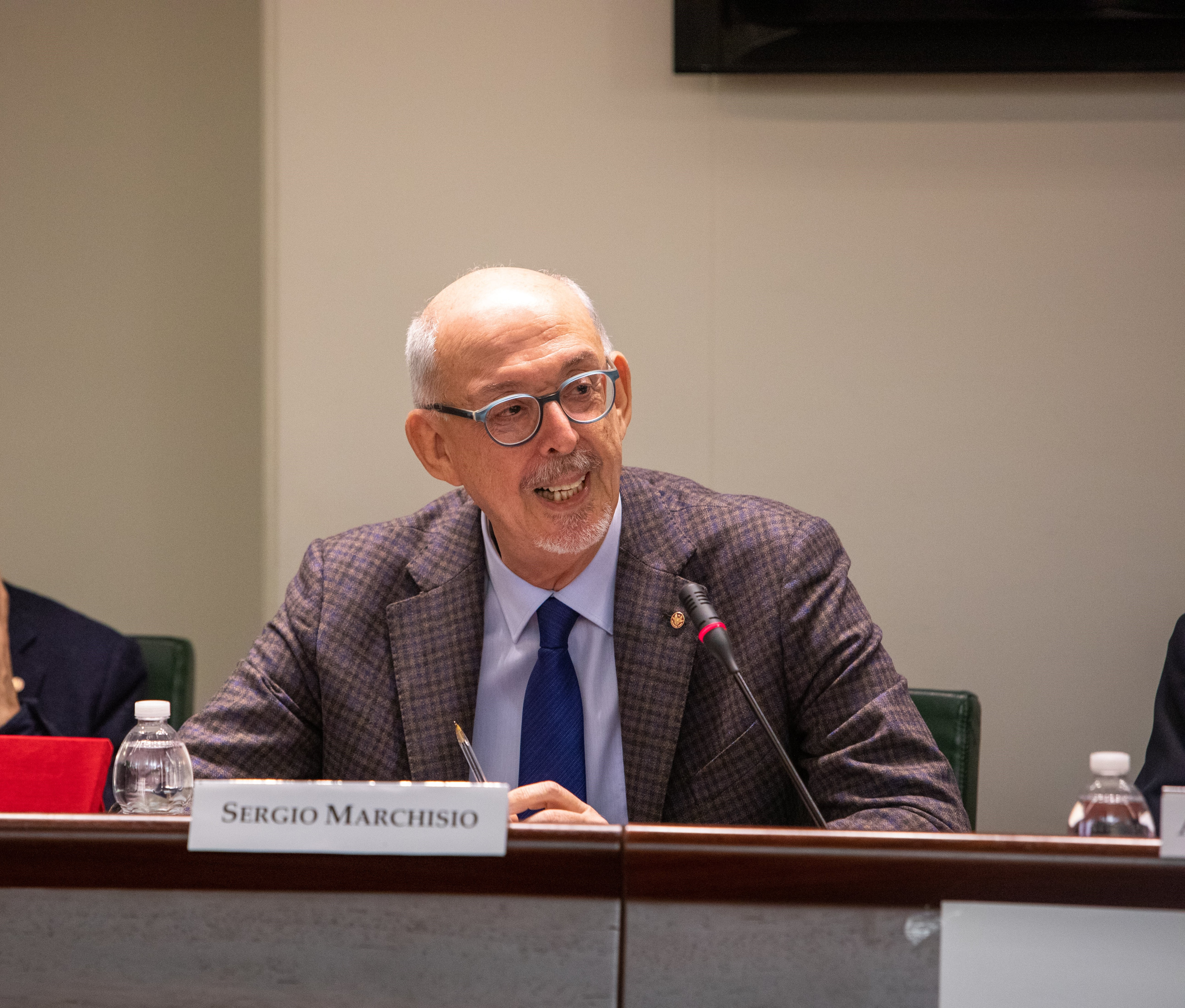
Sergio Marchisio, keynote speech on the occasion of the awarding of the Sapienza Human Rights Award 2019

In the 1970s, he was a pioneer in the study of legal issues until then neglected by academic legal experts, such as international development law within the United Nations system, the status of international non-governmental organizations, and the legal framework of multi-bilateral cooperation.

Because of his belief in the importance of international practice, he carried out under the supervision of Roberto Ago, Luigi Ferrari Bravo and Giorgio Gaja, long-standing research on the Italian practice of international law, which was edited and published in 1995 by the National Research Council (CNR) (Volumes I-VIII), subsequently digitalized and available at www.prassi.cnr.it. This was made possible thanks to the creation of the Institute for International Legal Studies of the National Research Council, of which he was the founder and then director between 1994 and 2011.

He also has studied the legal and institutional aspects of international organizations, particularly the United Nations (FAO, the status of EU as member of international organization, the role of the General Assembly in the maintenance of peace, peacekeeping operations and the use of force, the relation between general international law and the law of the UN); international environmental law (general aspects of dispute settlement, the Rio Declaration on Environment and Development, the promotion of sustainable development in the Mediterranean area); international criminal law (Statute of the ICC, the Priebke case and the non-applicability of the ICC Statute); as well as many other areas of international law such as human rights, refugee law, and disarmament.

As a member of the UN Committee on the Peaceful Uses of Outer Space, since the late 1990s, he has devoted special attention to the study of space law and has written various publications, beginning with Lezioni di diritto aerospaziale in 2000.

He is the author of over 200 scientific publications, including: Corso di diritto internazionale (2017); Diritto ambientale. Profili internazionali, europei, comparati (2017); Disarmo, limitazione degli armamenti e diritti umani (2016); L’ONU. Il diritto delle Nazioni Unite (2012); Rio 1992. Vertice per la Terra (1993); Le basi militari nel diritto internazionale (1984); La cooperazione per lo sviluppo nel diritto delle Nazioni Unite (1977).

== Professional career ==
In addition to his scientific contributions, he has participated in several international negotiations. He has always adopted a pragmatic approach to solving legal problems raised during discussions. In this sense, he has been involved in several negotiations and international initiatives regarding the identification of or creation of norms governing responsible behaviour in outer space.

Between 2001 and 2002, he was Chair of the Committee of Governmental Experts entrusted to negotiate the UNIDROIT Space Assets Protocol to the Cape Town Convention and of the Commission of the Whole of the Berlin Diplomatic Conference, which adopted the Protocol. He currently chairs the Preparatory Commission, established pursuant to Resolution 1 of the Berlin Diplomatic Conference, to act as Provisional Supervisory Authority for the establishment of the International Registry for Space Assets.

He was a delegate to the COPUOS, where he served as Chairman of the Legal Subcommittee (2004–2006) and, in 2010, Co-chair of the Expert Group D of the Working Group of the COPUOS Scientific and Technical Subcommittee (STSC) on the Long-term Sustainability of the Outer Space Activities (LTSSA).

He was also a delegate to the EU Council's Working Party on Global Disarmament and Arms Control (CODUN, 2007–2015), and to the Working Party on Non-Proliferation (CONOP, 2016–present).

He was a member of the EEAS-EU Task Force for the International Code of Conduct on Outer Space Activities (ICoC) and a delegate to the EU consultation and negotiation process on the ICoC (2007–2015). He was elected Chair of the multilateral negotiations on an ICoC held at the United Nations in New York, in July 2015.

He has been a member of the UN Groups of Governmental Experts (GGE): Outer Space Transparency and Confidence-Building Measures (GA Resolution 65/68) and on Practical Measures for the Prevention of an Arms Race in Outer Space (GA Resolution 72/250).

He has been a delegate to many international diplomatic conferences, such as the United Nations Conference on Environment and Development (Rio de Janeiro, 1992); the United Nations Diplomatic Conference of Plenipotentiaries on the Establishment of an International Criminal Court (Rome, 1998); the 2001 Cape Town Diplomatic Conference for the adoption of the UNIDROIT Convention on International Interests in High-Value Mobile Equipment and Protocol on Aircraft Assets (Cape Town, 2001).

Until 2014, he was a Member of the Italian Section of the International Commission on Civil Status of Strasbourg (CIEC).

Since 2007 he has been Chairman of the European Centre for Space Law (ECSL) within the European Space Agency (ESA). He is also a member of the Advisory Council of the European Space Policy Institute (ESPI). Since 2019, he has been appointed General Counsel of the International Astronautical Federation.

From 2014 to 2018, he was a member of the Board of Directors of the Italian Space Agency (ASI).

== Honours ==
In 2011, he received the Award of the International Academy of Astronautics for Social Sciences for his contribution to space law. In 2015, he received the Distinguished Service Award of the International Institute of Space Law for his leadership in the development of international law and institutions and his leading role in advancing international space law in the United Nations and other intergovernmental bodies. In 2019, he received the Sapienza Human Rights Award for his contribution to the progressive development of international human rights law and the promotion of the study and teaching of human rights.
