= Sérgio Ricardo =

Sérgio Ricardo may refer to:

- Sérgio Ricardo (director) (1932–2020), Brazilian film director
- Sérgio Ricardo (footballer) (born 1974), Brazilian football manager and former footballer
