= Serge Bezème =

Ivorian footballer

Personal information
- Date of birth: October 7, 1977 (age 49)
- Place of birth: Abidjan, Ivory Coast
- Height: 1.78 m (5 ft 10 in)
- Position: Midfielder

Team information
- Current team: ES Viry-Châtillon

Senior career*
Years	Team	Apps	(Gls)
1999–2000	FC Les Lilas		
2000–2002	L'Entente SSG		
2002–2003	FC Les Lilas		
2003	Portimonense	3	(0)
2004	US Boulogne		
2004–2008	Villemomble Sports		
2008–	ES Viry-Châtillon		
- * Club domestic league appearances and goals as of 19:24, 30 November 2009 (UTC)

Serge Bezème (born October 7, 1977 in Abidjan) is an Ivorian professional footballer who currently plays in the Championnat de France amateur for ES Viry-Châtillon.

He played a total of 3 matches at the professional level in Liga de Honra for Portimonense S.C.
