= Sergio Cabrera =

Sergio Cabrera may refer to:

- Sergio Cabrera (director), Colombian film director
- Sergio Cabrera (swimmer), Paraguayan swimmer
