= Sergio Gil =

Sergio Gil is the name of:

- Sergio Gil (footballer, born 1996), Spanish footballer
- Sérgio Gil (footballer, born 1970), Brazilian footballer
