= Sergio Santos =

Sergio Santos may refer to:

- Sergio Santos (baseball) (born 1983), American baseball player
- Sérgio Santos (volleyball) (born 1975), also known as Serginho or Escadinha, Brazilian volleyball player
- Sérgio Santos (footballer, born 1994), Brazilian football forward for Houston Dynamo FC
- Sérgio Santos (footballer, born 1998), Portuguese football forward for Petro Luanda
- Sergio Santos (footballer, born 2001), Spanish football right-back for Gimnàstic Tarragona

== See also ==
- Sergio Dos Santos (born 1950), South African soccer player
