= Sérgio Rodrigues =

Sérgio Rodrigues may refer to:

- Sérgio Rodrigues (swimmer) (born 1930), Brazilian freestyle swimmer and water polo player
- Sérgio Rodrigues (architect) (1927–2014), Brazilian architect and designer
- Sérgio Rodrigues (author) (born 1962), Brazilian author, literary critic and journalist
