= Serge Tsmikeboki =

Guadelopean footballer (born 1967)

Personal information
- Full name: Serge Tsmikeboki
- Date of birth: February 16, 1967 (age 59)
- Place of birth: Pointe-à-Pitre, Guadeloupe
- Height: 1.63 m (5 ft 4 in)
- Position: Striker

Senior career*
Years	Team	Apps	(Gls)
1988–1989	Villecresnes	?	(?)
1989–1991	Chamois Niortais	8	(0)
1991–1992	Melle	?	(?)
- * Club domestic league appearances and goals

Serge Tsmikeboki (born February 16, 1967) is a former professional footballer who played as a striker.
