= Sergio Rozenblat =

- Born: November 1, 1952 (age 73); Argentina
- Genres: Pop, Latin American music, Tropical music, Rock en Español
- Occupations: Director of Marketing, Radio promotion, A&R, Executive Producer, Vice President, President, Entrepreneur
- Years active: 1972 – present
- Labels: Warner Music Group, Time Warner, Univision, Latin Academy of Recording Arts & Sciences, CBS Records, Fania Records

Sergio Rozenblat (born November 1, 1952), entrepreneur, attorney at law, music advocate and talented artistic director. He is a native of Argentina, based out of Miami, Florida.

== Recent work ==
In 2010 Sergio Rozenblat established his independent record label "The Entity", in which he produced and released artist Charlie Zaa's De Bohemia which reached the top of the Billboard Latin Albums chart.

In 2004 Univision Radio appointed Rozenblat Vice President of FM Programming Operations for the U.S. Southeastern Region, which included Miami and Puerto Rico. Previous to that, in 2000 Rozenblat joined forces with Latino music superstar Julio Iglesias, Latin American TV star Don Francisco and online music pioneer Larry Rosen to found aplauso.com, a Web venture for Latin music and entertainment. However, the company never fully launched due to the Web 1.0 bursting of the dot-com bubble at the time. Previous to the web venture, Rozenblat was the Executive Director of the Latin Academy of Recording Arts & Sciences in 1998. This organization for the most part mirrors the National Academy of Recording Arts and Sciences in its services orientation. During his tenure there, three new categories were opened for the Latin Grammy Awards, memberships was increased 200 percent and the first Latin Grammy Award telecast was announced for September 2000, one year earlier than originally scheduled. Rozenblat's recommendation to book Ricky Martin for the 41st Grammy Awards telecast was influential in kicking off the Latin music craze in 1999.

Prior to his involvement with LARAS, Rozenblat was vice president and general manager of WEA Latina, a Warner Music International, Time Warner Company. When Rozenblat joined the record label in 1992, the company was in financial distress. When he left, the label had achieved the second position in market share of the multinational companies. Throughout the five years of Rozenblat's leadership, the company's talent roster expanded to include international artists such as Olga Tañón, Mana, Alejandro Sanz, Laura Pausini, Fito Páez, Miguel Bosé and Café Tacuba to name a few. Rozenblat played a leading role in the development of Rock en Español movement, which made Latin rock a viable commercial vehicle for the first time ever in the United States. He was also responsible for achieving the goal of having Luis Miguel become the first recording artist, in Spanish, to be awarded an RIAA Certification Platinum Record for sales exceeding one million units.

== Early start ==
From 1980 to 1987, Rozenblat's worked for CBS Records International as Director of A&R and Marketing. He was integrally involved in the initial recordings of Miami Sound Machine. Later he led the marketing transition of establishing Gloria Estefan as a solo artist. During his stay at CBS, Rozenblat was responsible for managing the departmental budget, new artists signings, song selection, producer assignation, repertoire approval and exploitation of international unreleased catalog. He also negotiated the acquisition for distribution of the Fonovisa and Orfeon labels from Mexico, Cara Records from Texas, and Hispavox Records from Spain. While attending law school at night at the University of Miami School of Law, where he completed his J.D. in 1989, he kept the department fully operational, including the design and implementation of the crossover of Gloria Estefan and Miami Sound Machine. Other major international artists he guided while at CBS were Julio Iglesias, Roberto Carlos, José Luis Rodríguez, Vicente Fernández and Raphael.

Following CBS, he practiced entertainment law at a prestigious law firm in Miami, representing among other Gloria and Emilio Estefan. However, his love for the creative process and the music never left him, enticing him back to the fold of Warner Music International in 1992.

Rozenblat's association with the music industry dates back to 1977. While living in New York City, Rozenblat was invited to fly to California for a Fania All-Stars concert by a family friend who was a producer for Fania Records. With some salesmanship and a bit of luck he was instantly hired by Fania's president after Rozenblat proved himself by selling 100 extra tickets to the concert and giving all the earnings to the president. His honesty landed him his first job in the industry.

Soon Rozenblat was responsible for radio promotion in California, introducing tropical music, which at the time was new in the market. Later he managed Fania's recording studio in New York where over 30 acts recorded. When promoted to Director of Publicity, he became responsible for the national exposure of all the acts in the roster, including such artists as Rubén Blades, Celia Cruz, Fania All-Stars, and Willie Colón.

== Speaking engagements ==
In November 1997, Rozenblat was invited by Berklee College of Music to give a lecture to Music Business students on his view and insights of the U.S. Latin Music Market. During his time at WEA Latina he hired various Berklee graduates.

In 2012, Rozenblat spoke at the Billboard Latin Music Conference under the panel "Do It Yourself | Independent Record Labels"

== Personal life ==
Recently, Mr. Rozenblat has become a strong voice in the fight against gun violence. February 14, 2018, Mr. Rozenblat's youngest daughter, who was a 10th grade student at Marjory Stoneman Douglas High School in Parkland, Florida, survived a mass school shooting, where a gunman, who was a former student, opened fire with an AR-15 semi automatic rifle, shot and killed 17 students, in the Valentine's Day massacre.

As a result of the mass shooting, Mr. Rozenblat was interviewed by NBC, MSNBC and many other media outlets, the day after the Parkland massacre, when he called on politicians to "stop accepting blood money."

Mr. Rozenblat has since become a strong advocate against gun violence and the National Finance Chairman of Families vs. Assault Rifles PAC, Inc. (FAMSVARPAC).

Sergio Rozenblat continues his advocacy regarding gun violence and empowering others to get involved to make a difference to protect all of our children and future of generations to come.
