= Serge Marcotoune =

Sergei Markotun (1890–1971), better known as Serge Marcotoune, was born on July 15, 1890, in St. Petersburg. He was an influential figure in European diplomacy and Martinism during the first decades of the 20th century.

== Biography ==
His father was a doctor of the Royal House and his mother the daughter of a Ukrainian Orthodox priest. Thanks to them, he acquired a deep interest in politics and spirituality, which he tried to harmonise throughout his life. It is because of this desire to balance opposites that Marcotoune became one of the most discreet and influential figures in European diplomacy and Martinism during the first decades of the 20th century.

His first steps in esotericism were taken in 1912, while he was studying Law, History and Philology. Around this time, the Martinist Order organised by Papus was going through a period of renewal in Russia. Czeslaw Czynski was presiding over the Martinist lodges from afar, Grigori Ottonovich Mebes’ group had become independent and Piotr Kaznacheev had just been confirmed as Interim Delegate of the Martinist Order. It is in this context of change that the young Marcotoune received his first degree from Kaznacheev, and was commissioned to found a Martinist lodge in Kiev. However, his political obligations and commitments led him to travel frequently, which meant that his initiations and subsequent positions came from different places, although all emanated from within the Papus’ Martinist Order. An example of this was that he received his second degree in Italy, was appointed Delegate for Ukraine by the Supreme Council of the Martinist Order (based in Paris) and was appointed by Kaznacheev as representative to the governments of Kiev, Chernigov and Poltava.

Parallel to its initiatory formation, the Russian Revolution had turned Ukraine into a breeding ground for autonomist and nationalist politics. That is why Marcotoune returned to Kiev in 1917, to expand the activity of the Martinist lodge St Andrew the Apostle No. 1 and create a political group called Young Ukraine, close to the nationalist leaders Symon Petlyura and Pavlo Skoropadski. When the latter came to power, Marcotoune was appointed its secretary and became a brilliant diplomat, arbitrating in the power struggles of both leaders and using his European initiatory connections to prevent his brothers from going through painful personal situations because of the conflict. He continued to work in this way until 1920 when, unable to continue to subtract Ukraine from Soviet control, he had to emigrate to France.

On arrival in France, he received a patent from Jean Bricaud to found his own lodge in France. This is how the Renaissance lodge came into being, later renamed St Andrew the Apostle No. 2, which was the place from which he spread his ideas of initiatory formation and kept alive the “Mysterium” of the old Russian lodges of the Martinist Order. This lodge functioned until 1945 with Marcotoune as its leader, and until 1953 being presided over by him from the Canary Islands where he then moved. Because of its solid and continuous work, this structure exerted a vital influence on the main proponents of “Russian Martinism” such as Robert Ambelain, Armand Toussaint and Daniel Fontaine, the last two disciples of Marcotoune.

Nor in France did he completely renounce diplomacy, as from 1922 he was secretary of the Association of Slavonic Masons. Through this institution, Marcotoune centralised all his efforts and connections in order to facilitate the emigration of those fleeing to the West, escaping the “Red Terror”.

Serge Marcotoune devoted part of his time to research on Martinism, publishing two books that constitute his most lucid and personal legacy.

The first is La science secrète des initiés et la pratique de la vie [The Secret Science of the Initiates and the Practice of Life], which was published in 1928 and consists of an enlightening treatise on the laws of Numbers and Arcana from a philosophical viewpoint.

The second is La Voie initiatique: pratique de la vie initiatique [The Initiatic Way: the Practice of the Initiatic Life], published in 1956, which is a compelling study of the cosmic laws, the stages of human ascension and the struggle against the errors and obstacles which prevent man from ascending. Both books form a brilliant synthesis of the Martinist Way of the Heart in Marcotoune’s vision, where each complements the other. In La science secrète des initiés he synthesised the initiatory philosophy, and in La Voie initiatique he attempted to show the application of this ideology within the framework of the efforts of a man who is attempting to become an initiate.

Serge Marcotoune died in 1971 in the Canary Islands (Tenerife), where he had lived since 1945, after emigrating from France because he was targeted by the Gestapo for his esoteric activities. His life was the faithful reflection of the “Initiatic Life” that he preached: he fluctuated between worldliness and spirituality, without breaking the harmony that should exist between both; and attributing to each the exact value that they have, but developing to the maximum in each of those spheres. It was in this way that Marcotoune, through its coherence, brilliance and constancy, exerted a discreet but vital influence, not only among the emigrants it sheltered, but also in Martinism; where he left a very rich literary legacy, and where its work decisively marked those who inaugurated, for better or worse, the modern concept of “Russian Martinism”.
