= Sergio Lozano =

Sergio Lozano may refer to:

- Sergio Lozano (futsal player) (born 1988), Spanish futsal player
- Sergio Lozano (boxer) (born 1952), Mexican boxer
- Sergio Lozano (footballer) (born 1999), Spanish footballer
