= Sergio Esteban Vélez =

Colombian writer, professor and journalist

Sergio Esteban Vélez Peláez (born 1983) is a Colombian (of Spanish descent) writer, professor and journalist. He won the Premio Nacional de Periodismo Simón Bolívar 2010 (National Journalism Award Simon Bolivar)», the Premio Internacional de Periodismo José María Heredia 2010 (International Journalism Award Jose Maria Heredia 2010).) and the Premio Cipa a la Excelencia Periodística 2012 (Cipa Award). The poet Olga Elena Mattei says that Vélez represents the Andean aspect of the contemporary Colombian poetry. Vélez is a Communicator of the University of Antioquia, Colombia.

Born in Medellín, he studied Law and Political Science at the Bolivarian Pontifical University and studied Modern Languages at Sherbrooke University. He collaborates as a weekly columnist in the newspaper El Mundo. He was the creator of the Academia Antioqueña de Letras, with Octavio Arizmendi Posada, former Minister of Education of Colombia.

In 2002 Sergio Esteban Vélez was appointed Cultural Director of the Colegio Altos Estudios de Quirama.

== Works ==
=== Books of poetry ===
- "Nocturnal Glean" (Destellos nocturnos) Edited, 1996 & 1997, written at the age of 12
- "Fire Inside" (Entre el fuego) Edited, 1998 & 1999
- "Mystic Symphony" (Sinfonia Mística)(Sonnets, 2000) (Introduction, Octavio Arizmendi Posada, former Minister of Education – Colombia).
- "Weave under Skin" (Urdimbre bajo la piel). Edited, 2005. Illustrations, David Manzur; introduction. O. E. Mattei, Fernando Vallejo
- "Hollow Story" (Historia cóoncava) 2004. Introduction Meira Delmar (important Colombian poet). Special mention in the Premio Porfirio Barba Jacob
- "Inner Rooms" 2006. Partially published by Revista Mefisto. Illustrations by David Manzur (important Colombian painter)
- "Expanding Aura" (Para expandir el aura) (Anthological selection)

=== History works ===
- "Color in Colombian Modern Art" (Prologue by Belisario Betancur, Colombian ex president). Illustrated, full color edition, 2007.
- "David Manzur, en sus propias palabras" (Laureated thesis, 2008)
- Dozens of essays, Literary Critics, Art Critics. Numerous articles about Distinguished men from Antioquia, History and Religious topics.

=== Distinctions ===
- "Poète de LatinArte 2013-2014" (Festival LatinArte, Montreal, Canada, 2013).
- Premio "Papel Periódico" (Newsprint Award). Asociación Pro Libertad de Prensa (Association for Freedom of the Press). Havana, Cuba, 2013
- Cipa Award (Premio Cipa a la Excelencia Periodística (Círculo de Periodistas de Antioquia, Medellín, Colombie, 2012).
- National Journalism Award "Simon Bolivar" (2010) (Premio Nacional de Periodismo Simón Bolívar)).
- International Journalism Award "José Maria Heredia" (2010) (Premio Internacional de Periodismo José María Heredia (Los Angeles, 2010). ).
- Integral Humanistics Award (Asociación Colombiana de Profesionales Integrales ASOPROINT, 2005).
- Finalist of the National Poetry Award "Porfirio Barba Jacob" (2004), the Literary Award "Jorge Isaacs" (2005)and the National Poetry Award "Avatares"
- Colombian delegate to the VII Jornadas Andinas de Literatura Latinoamericana. Santiago de Chile, octubre de 2005.
- Quoted by Concejo de Medellín and Academia Antioqueña de Historia, in the book "Historia de Medellín: 330 años", among ten noted poets born in Medellín.
- Various homages to his cultural work (Club Campestre, Comfama, Inteco, Academia Ant. de Letras, Centro Lit. Antioquia, Instituto Ferrini, Colegas).
- Numerous and positive critics from specialists, writers, press and personalities, about his cultural work.
- Numerous interviews for press, radio and TV (Colombia, USA, Latin-American, Peru, Canada)
- Poetry readings in important auditoriums of Colombia, Buenos Aires, Santiago de Chile, Quito, Lima, Quebec and Montreal.
- Poems included in press reviews in Colombia, España, Mexico, Peru, El Salvador, Uruguay, China and Sweden.
- Cultural promoter. Organizer and director of dozens of cultural events in Medellín.
- Ad-honorem collaborator, for more than 10 years, to many social civic, politic and ecologic groups.
- Named member of prestigious cultural institutions (World Poets Society, Asociación Hispánica de Humanidades, Red Mundial de Escritores en Espanol, Poetas del Mundo, Unión Hispanoamericana de Escritores, Academia Colombiana de Historia Policial, Academia Antioqueña de Letras, Colegio de Academias de Antioquia, Asociación Iberoamericana de la Décima, Asociación Colombiana de Corresponsales de Prensa, Asociación Nacional de Profesionales Integrales, Fundación "Maestro Luis Uribe Bueno", Centro Literario "Antioquia").

== Bibliography ==
- El Color en el Arte Moderno Colombiano. Medellín, Colorquímica, 2007. Texts by Sergio Esteban Vélez. Prologue by Belisario Betancur, former President of Colombia
- MATTEI, Olga Elena. Introducciôn a Estancias Cerradas. Medellín, Calíope, 2005.
- AGUDELO, Mara. Sergio Esteban Vélez, en Corazonadas Infantiles. Medellín, Uryco, 1999.
