= Serge Edongo =

Cameroonian volleyball player (born 1982)

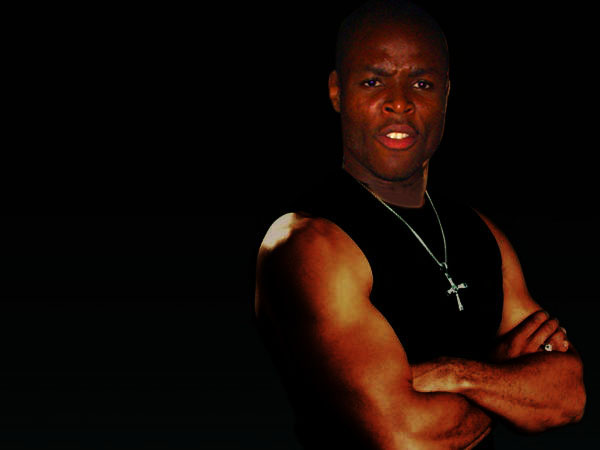

Personal information
- Full name: Serge Edongo Ambembe
- Born: May 17, 1982 (age 44); Cameroon
- Height: 1.90 m (6 ft 3 in)
- Spike: 343 cm (135 in)
- Block: 335 cm (132 in)

Volleyball information
- Current team: Esperance of Tunis Manga Sport Gabon; Al Khor Qatar; Najma VB Bahrain; Riffa vb Bahrain; Lilla GRau Spain; Villejuif France; Villers Cotterets France Reims VB France

National team
Cameroon

Serge Edongo (born May 17, 1982) is a Cameroonian former professional volleyball player. He is currently retired. His position on the field is opposite hitter and after his career as a player he trained.

Edongo has previously played for teams in Cameroon, Gabon, Tunisia, Qatar, Bahrain, Spain, France. He won personal awards as Best Player of the Year in Cameroon and Gabon, 3rd best serve Cairo Egypt. Edongo has previously coached Girl Team Villers Cotterets VB N3 (2010/2013), N2 Reims Metropole VB (2014/2017) He has been playing for Cameroon since 1999.
