= Sergio Hernández =

Sergio Hernández may refer to the following people:

- Sergio Hernández (actor) (born 1945), Chilean actor
- Sergio Hernández (basketball) (born 1963), Argentine basketball coach
- Sergio Hernández (footballer, born 2002), Mexican footballer playing for UdeG
- Sergio Hernández (footballer, born 2004), Mexican footballer playing for Atlas
- Sergio Hernández Hernández (born 1962), Mexican politician
- Sergio Hernández (racing driver) (born 1983), Spanish racing driver
- Sergio Hernández (Venezuelan footballer) (born 1971), Venezuelan footballer
- Sergio Adrián Hernández Güereca (born 1994), Mexican teenager whose shooting led to a legal case considered twice by the Supreme Court of the United States as Hernandez v. Mesa

Hernández as second surname:

- Sergio González Hernández (born 1955), Mexican politician
- Sergio Sánchez Hernández (born 1968), Spanish athlete
- Sergio Tolento Hernández (born 1959), Mexican politician
