= Sergio Brusin =

Italian public health advisor

- Education: University of Bologna
- Occupations: Epidemiologist, public health advisor
- Employer: European Union Agency for Asylum
- Known for: Development of ECDC infectious disease risk assessment methodology
- Title: Head of the MedCOI Sector
- Scientific career
- Fields: Public health

Sergio Brusin an Italian epidemiologist and public health advisor. Brusin is the former Principal Expert Response and Emergency Operations at the European Centre for Disease Prevention and Control. Brusin developed the ECDC infectious disease risk assessment methodology that is used by ECDC and other public health institutions in assessing the risk posed by communicable disease events. In early March 2020, Brusin urged the UK government to take action and urgently implement lockdown measures referring to Italy as the catastrophic example to avoid. He also advocated for far fewer travel restrictions during the COVID-19 pandemic recommending to concentrate the response efforts to stricter domestic control measures strongly enforced. As of 2024, Brusin is the Head of the MedCOI (Note: MedCOI stands for Medical Country of Origin Information.) Sector at the European Union Agency for Asylum (EUAA)—formerly known as the European Asylum Support Office (EASO). At the EUAA he co-authored the first ever MedCOI methodology EUAA MedCOI Methodology He is one of the contributors to the Strengthening Data Sharing for Public Health project by Chatham House. The initiative aims to enhance public health by facilitating the sharing of surveillance data, promoting regional collaborations, capacity building, and improving risk management while addressing technical, ethical, and legal concerns.

== Career ==
Brusin completed his fellowship with the European Programme for Intervention Epidemiology Training (EPIET) as part of its third cohort (1997-1999) at the Health Protection Agency in Colindale, London. Following his fellowship, Brusin moved to South Africa where he started working on upgrading the Health Information System for the Gauteng Province and later for the national system, under the sponsorship of the Italian Ministry of Foreign Affairs. He later coordinated health cooperation activities between Italy and South Africa. In 2006, Brusin returned to Italy to coordinate international projects at the Istituto Superiore di Sanità (ISS) in Rome. He later resumed his work in South Africa in 2008, focusing on collaborations for HIV/AIDS clinical trials. In 2010, Brusin joined the European Centre for Disease Prevention and Control (ECDC) as a Senior Expert in General Surveillance, advancing to Group Leader for Epidemic Intelligence in 2014, and subsequently to Group Leader for Response and Emergency Operations in 2016. He left ECDC in October 2020 for the EUAA where he is Head of the MedCOI Sector.

=== On Covid-19, lockdown, and closing schools ===
==== Telegraph interview ====
In early March 2020, Brusin urged the UK government to take action and urgently implement lockdown measures referring to Italy as the catastrophic example to avoid.

Brusin valued the importance of preparing for novel pathogens like "Disease X" in managing pandemics. Many countries' pandemic plans were outdated and primarily focused on influenza, lacking measures for suppression, which made COVID-19 more challenging to control. Brusin highlighted that countries with flexible plans incorporating suppression strategies fared better. Brusin’s work focused on two key factors in combating the virus: public behavior and governmental response capabilities, including testing, contact tracing, and communication. He contrasted Europe's response with that of Southeast Asia, attributing the latter's swift actions to prior experiences with SARS and cultural practices like mask-wearing.

Brusin observed that Europe's hygiene culture has changed significantly, with many adapting to the 'new normal' of physical distancing and other preventive measures, which he believed will persist due to the ongoing threat of COVID-19. He expressed optimism about managing future resurgences without the need for full lockdowns, provided health services can cope.

Brusin criticized the lack of coordination in Europe, particularly regarding travel restrictions, and called for a more centralized response with stronger legal frameworks to improve efficiency in future outbreaks. He remained optimistic that Europe will enhance its preparedness and coordination, learning from the COVID-19 experience.

==== Gazeta Prawna interview ====
In an August 2020 interview with Klara Klinger and Jakub Kapiszewski for the Polish publication Gazeta Prawna, Brusin, then head of the coronavirus team at the European Centre for Disease Prevention and Control (ECDC), provided an overview of the COVID-19 pandemic as of 2020. Brusin emphasized that the world was still experiencing the first wave of the pandemic, with case numbers increasing globally, particularly in America and Africa, while Europe faced a resurgence after an initial decline. He attributed the re-growth in cases to the relaxation of lockdown measures and noted a significant rise in infections among young people, who generally experienced milder symptoms, thereby reducing the burden on healthcare systems compared to the initial outbreak.

Brusin stressed the continued importance of basic preventive measures such as social distancing, mask-wearing, and hand hygiene. He said that maintaining these practices, along with extensive testing, were crucial to controlling the virus's spread. Brusin mentioned the potential for a vaccine by early 2021 but cautioned about the challenges of production and distribution. He underscored the importance of prioritizing vaccinations for high-risk groups and essential workers.

Brusin argued that closing schools would not significantly impact the epidemic's progression, provided that preventive measures were implemented. He pointed out that younger children, who benefit greatly from in-person education, should return to school with proper precautions. For teachers, especially older ones, he recommended stringent protective measures. Brusin acknowledged the significant unknowns about COVID-19, particularly concerning immunity and the role of cellular immunity. He emphasized the need for ongoing research to understand the virus better. Brusin argued that while complete lockdowns are unsustainable, other measures such as social distancing and contact tracing are essential for managing the pandemic. He also stressed the necessity of being better prepared for future pandemics through early warning systems, adequate supplies, and international coordination.

== Selected publications ==
- Ong, C.W.M., Migliori, G.B., Raviglione, M., MacGregor-Skinner, G., Sotgiu, G., Alffenaar, J.W., Tiberi, S., Adlhoch, C., Alonzi, T., Archuleta, S. and Brusin, S., 2020. Epidemic and pandemic viral infections: impact on tuberculosis and the lung: A consensus by the World Association for Infectious Diseases and Immunological Disorders (WAidid), Global Tuberculosis Network (GTN), and members of the European Society of Clinical Microbiology and Infectious Diseases Study Group for Mycobacterial Infections (ESGMYC). European Respiratory Journal, 56(4).
- Domanović, D., Ushiro-Lumb, I., Compernolle, V., Brusin, S., Funk, M., Gallian, P., Georgsen, J., Janssen, M., Jimenez-Marco, T., Knutson, F. and Liumbruno, G.M., 2019. Pathogen reduction of blood components during outbreaks of infectious diseases in the European Union: an expert opinion from the European Centre for Disease Prevention and Control consultation meeting. Blood transfusion, 17(6), p.433.
- Semenza, J.C., Sewe, M.O., Lindgren, E., Brusin, S., Aaslav, K.K., Mollet, T. and Rocklöv, J., 2019. Systemic resilience to cross‐border infectious disease threat events in Europe. Transboundary and emerging diseases, 66(5), pp.1855-1863.
- Walker, T.M., Merker, M., Knoblauch, A.M., Helbling, P., Schoch, O.D., Van Der Werf, M.J., Kranzer, K., Fiebig, L., Kröger, S., Haas, W. and Hoffmann, H., 2018. A cluster of multidrug-resistant Mycobacterium tuberculosis among patients arriving in Europe from the Horn of Africa: a molecular epidemiological study. The Lancet Infectious Diseases, 18(4), pp.431-440.
- Escriva, A.B., Simanova, H., Brusin, S. and Plachouras, D., 2018. Public health issue.
- Coulombier, D., Derrough, T., Donachie, A., Aaslav, K.K., de Jong, B., Brusin, S. and Plachouras, D., 2014. Measles on a cruise ship, Mediterranean Sea.
- Severi, E., Westrell, T., Gossner, C., Johansson, K., Niskanen, T., Brusin, S., Plachouras, D., Takkinen, J., Coulombier, D., Boelaert, F. and Rizzi, V., 2014. Source and date of request.
- Brusin, S., 2000. The Communicable Disease Surveillance System in the Kosovar refugee camps in the former Yugoslav Republic of Macedonia April–August 1999. Journal of Epidemiology & Community Health, 54(1), pp.52-57.
