= Sérgio Ministro =

Portuguese footballer

Personal information
- Full name: Sérgio Fontes Silva
- Date of birth: 20 November 1992 (age 33)
- Place of birth: São João de Ver, Portugal
- Height: 1.75 m (5 ft 9 in)
- Position: Midfielder

Team information
- Current team: Mafra
- Number: 6

Youth career
- 2000–2005: São João de Ver
- 2005–2011: Feirense

Senior career*
Years	Team	Apps	(Gls)
2011–2013	Feirense	0	(0)
2011–2013	→ São João de Ver (loan)	24	(0)
2013–2014	União Lamas		
2014–2015	São João de Ver	30	(1)
2015–2018	Sporting Espinho	94	(3)
2018–	Mafra	0	(0)
- * Club domestic league appearances and goals as of 21 July 2018

Sérgio Fontes Silva (born 20 November 1992) known as Sérgio Ministro, is a Portuguese professional footballer who plays for Mafra as a midfielder.

== Football career ==
On 21 July 2018, Ministro made his professional debut with Mafra in a 2018–19 Taça da Liga match against Sporting Covilhã.
