= Sergio Álvarez =

Sergio Álvarez may refer to:

- Sergio Álvarez (sport shooter) (born 1948), Cuban Olympic sport shooter
- Sergio Álvarez Mata (born 1962), Mexican politician
- Sergio Álvarez (weightlifter) (born 1979), Cuban weightlifter
- Sergio Álvarez (footballer, born 1986), Spanish footballer
- Sergio Álvarez (footballer, born 1992), Spanish footballer
