= Sergio Amedeo Pignari =

Sergio Amedeo Pignari from the Politecnico di Milano, Milano, Italy was named Fellow of the Institute of Electrical and Electronics Engineers (IEEE) in 2012 for contributions to immunity characterization using bulk current injection test methods.
