= Sergio Fernández (footballer, born 1975) =

Spanish footballer

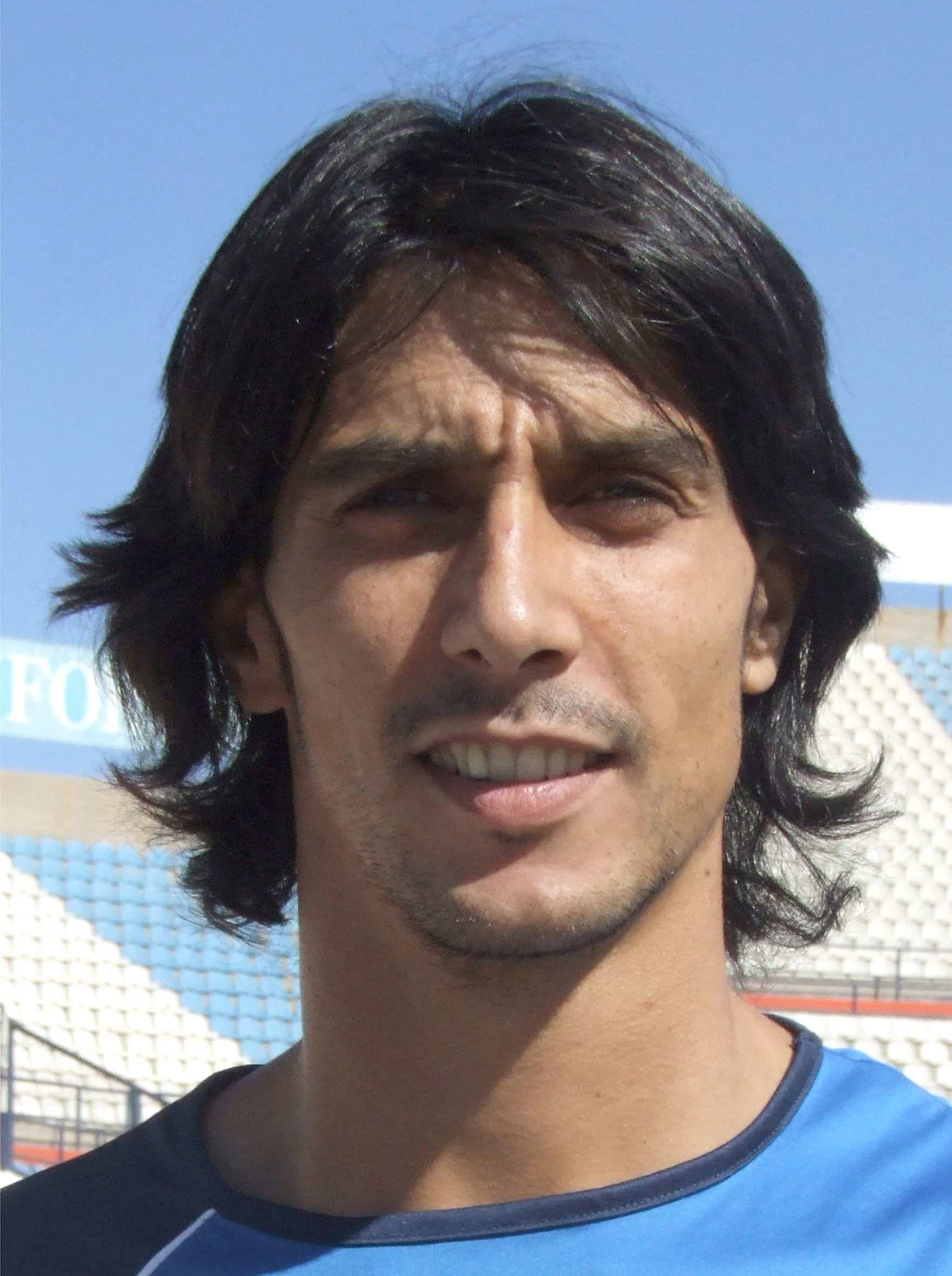
- Fernández with Hércules in 2006

Personal information
- Full name: Sergio Fernández Álvarez
- Date of birth: 9 February 1975 (age 51)
- Place of birth: León, Spain
- Height: 1.87 m (6 ft 2 in)
- Position: Centre-back

Youth career
- Atlético Pinilla
- Puente Castro
- 1991–1993: Logroñés

Senior career*
Years	Team	Apps	(Gls)
1993–1996	Logroñés B	42	(0)
1996–1997	Cultural Leonesa	14	(0)
1997	Aurrerá	0	(0)
1998	Numancia	3	(0)
1998–1999	Poli Almería	36	(0)
1999–2000	Cartagonova	24	(0)
2000–2003	Cultural Leonesa	108	(1)
2003–2009	Hércules	210	(7)
2009–2010	Murcia	39	(1)
Total		476	(9)

Managerial career
- 2013–2014: Betis (assistant)
- * Club domestic league appearances and goals

Sergio Fernández Álvarez (born 9 February 1975) is a Spanish former professional footballer who played as a central defender.

== Club career ==
Fernández was born in León, Region of León. Having spent most of his career in the Segunda División B (with a brief unassuming spell in the Segunda División with CD Numancia) he arrived at Hércules CF aged 28, and helped to a return to the second tier in his second year.

Following the outstanding 2008–09 season, where his club narrowly missed on a La Liga return, negotiations broke down for renovation of Fernández's contract. In late June 2009, he agreed on a move to Real Murcia CF in the same league.

In the 2009–10 campaign, veteran Fernández was a defensive mainstay for Murcia, only missing three league games out of 42, but his team was eventually relegated. He decided to retire aged 35, being immediately appointed his last club's director of football; he signed with former side Hércules the following year, in the same capacity.

On 2 December 2013, Álvarez joined newly appointed Juan Carlos Garrido's staff at Real Betis after Pepe Mel was dismissed. On 16 June 2016, he was named sporting director at Deportivo Alavés, recently returned to the top flight.
