= Sergio Díaz (footballer, born 1991) =

Spanish footballer

Personal information
- Full name: Sergio Díaz Castilla
- Date of birth: 2 July 1991 (age 35)
- Place of birth: Málaga, Spain
- Height: 1.82 m (6 ft 0 in)
- Position: Left back

Team information
- Current team: Juventud Torremolinos
- Number: 16

Youth career
- Málaga

Senior career*
Years	Team	Apps	(Gls)
2010–2011	Málaga B	22	(1)
2011–2012	Málaga	0	(0)
2011–2012	→ Hércules (loan)	3	(0)
2012–2013	Huesca	9	(0)
2013–2014	Mallorca B	15	(0)
2013–2014	→ Oviedo (loan)	19	(1)
2015	Córdoba B	13	(0)
2015–2016	Melilla	14	(0)
2017	Vélez	14	(1)
2017–2022	Antequera	108	(4)
2022–2023	Atlético Mancha Real	29	(2)
2023–	Juventud Torremolinos	65	(2)
- * Club domestic league appearances and goals as of 10 June 2026

Sergio Díaz Castilla (born 2 July 1991) is a Spanish footballer who plays as a left back for Juventud Torremolinos.

== Club career ==
Born in Málaga, Andalusia, Díaz spent his first year as a senior with local Atlético Malagueño, in Tercera División. In July 2011 he was loaned to Hércules CF, with the Segunda División club having an option to buy at the end of the season.

Díaz made his official debut for Hércules on 7 September 2011, in a 3–2 home win against CD Alcoyano in the second round in the Copa del Rey (a 3–0 loss was awarded later), and he played his first league match on the 16th, coming on as an 80th-minute substitute for Adrián Sardinero in the 2–1 home victory over FC Barcelona B.
