= Sergio Villanueva (footballer) =

Spanish footballer

Personal information
- Full name: Sergio Villanueva Fernández
- Date of birth: 2 November 1975 (age 51)
- Place of birth: Mieres, Spain
- Height: 1.71 m (5 ft 7 1/2 in)
- Position: Midfielder

Team information
- Current team: Tuilla

Youth career
- Caudal

Senior career*
Years	Team	Apps	(Gls)
1994–1996	Caudal	32	(2)
1994–1995	→ Santiago Aller (loan)	35	(6)
1996–1998	Sporting B	32	(3)
1997–1998	→ Caudal (loan)	28	(1)
1998–1999	Alavés B		
1999	Noja	9	(1)
1999–2002	Marino	106	(35)
2002–2003	Eibar	2	(0)
2003–2005	Zamora	92	(10)
2005–2007	Vecindario	45	(5)
2007–2010	Oviedo	86	(16)
2010–2012	Marino	86	(19)
2012–2016	Lealtad	124	(17)
2016–	Tuilla	20	(3)
- * Club domestic league appearances and goals as of 20 May 2018

Sergio Villanueva Fernández (born 2 November 1975) is a Spanish professional footballer who plays for CD Tuilla as a midfielder.

== Football career ==
Born in Mieres, Asturias, Villanueva graduated from Caudal Deportivo's youth setup, and made his senior debut while on loan at amateurs Santiago de Aller CF in 1994. In 1996 he signed for Sporting de Gijón, being assigned to the reserves in Segunda División B but eventually returning to his first club in the following year, in a season-long loan deal.

Villanueva moved to another reserve team in the summer of 1998, Deportivo Alavés B from Tercera División. In January of the following year he joined SD Noja in the third level, and subsequently represented Club Marino de Luanco, playing in both the third and fourth tiers.

In July 2002, Villanueva signed with Segunda División's SD Eibar. His first match as a professional took place on 1 September, aged 27, playing the last two minutes in a 0–0 away draw against Polideportivo Ejido. After featuring rarely, however, he moved to Zamora CF in January of the following year.

Villanueva joined third division side UD Vecindario in the 2005 off-season, appearing regularly in his first season, which ended in promotion. He was played sparingly in his second, and terminated his contract on 22 January 2007, subsequently signing for Real Oviedo.

Villanueva moved back to former club Marino de Luanco in 2010, being promoted to the third level at the first attempt. In August 2012, he joined CD Lealtad also in his native region and division four.
