= Sergio Pérez (footballer, born 1988) =

Uruguayan footballer

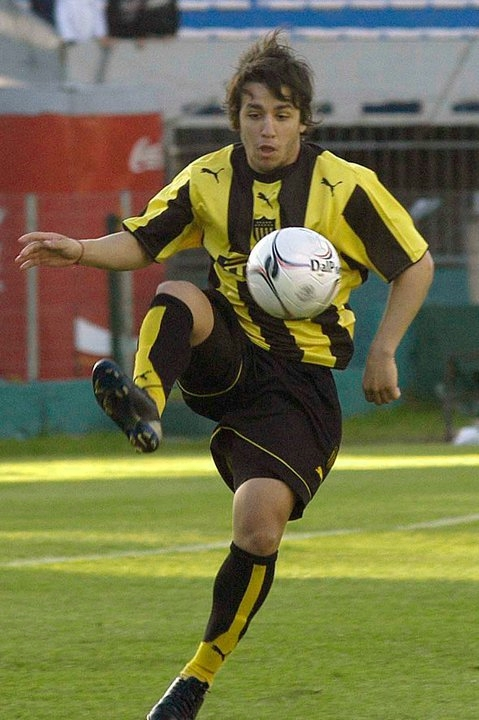
- Pérez with Peñarol in 2007

Personal information
- Full name: Sergio Maximiliano Pérez Visca
- Date of birth: 26 May 1988 (age 38)
- Place of birth: Montevideo, Uruguay
- Height: 1.66 m (5 ft 5 in)
- Position: Midfielder

Youth career
- Peñarol

Senior career*
Years	Team	Apps	(Gls)
2007–2010	Peñarol	26	(3)
2008	→ Tacuarembó (loan)	13	(1)
2009	→ Cerro (loan)	14	(3)
2010–2012	Cerro	20	(1)
2011	→ Racing Montevideo (loan)	5	(0)
2012	El Tanque Sisley	0	(0)
2013	Central Español	10	(0)
2013–2014	Almirante Brown	11	(1)
2014–2016	Deportes Concepción	26	(1)
2016–2018	Progreso	27	(1)
2019	Albion	5	(0)
- * Club domestic league appearances and goals

Sergio Maximiliano Pérez Visca (born May 26, 1988, in Montevideo, Uruguay) is a Uruguayan former football midfielder.

== Teams ==
- (Uruguay) Peñarol 2007–2008
- (Uruguay) Tacuarembó 2008
- (Uruguay) Cerro 2009
- (Uruguay) Peñarol 2009–2010
- (Uruguay) Cerro 2010–2011
- (Uruguay) Racing de Montevideo 2011
- (Uruguay) Cerro 2012
- (Uruguay) El Tanque Sisley 2012
- (Uruguay) Central Español 2013
- (Argentina) Almirante Brown 2013–2014
- (Chile) Deportes Concepción 2014–2016
- (Uruguay) Progreso 2016–2018
- (Uruguay) Albion 2019
