= San Kristobal station =

Railway station in Busturia, Basque Country, Spain

San Kristobal

General information
- Location: Busturia, Biscay; Spain
- Coordinates: 43°22′03″N 2°41′25″W
- Owner: Euskal Trenbide Sarea
- Operator: Euskotren
- Line: Line E4
- Platforms: 1 side platform
- Tracks: 1

Construction
- Structure type: At-grade
- Parking: Yes
- Accessible: Partial

Other information
- Fare zone: Zone 4

History
- Opened: 15 March 1893
- Rebuilt: 1990s

Services
Preceding station	Euskotren Trena	Following station
Forua towards Matiko	Line E4	Axpe towards Bermeo
Location

San Kristobal is a railway station in Busturia, Basque Country, Spain. It is owned by Euskal Trenbide Sarea and operated by Euskotren. It lies on the Urdaibai line.

== History ==
The station opened, together with the rest of the Gernika-Pedernales extension of the Amorebieta-Gernika line, on 15 March 1893. The station building was used as a barracks during the Spanish Civil War, and was restored after the end of the hostilities. It was demolished in the 1990s due to its bad condition, and at the same time the station was rebuilt slightly to the north.

== Services ==
The station is served by Euskotren Trena line E4. It runs every 30 minutes (in each direction) during weekdays, and every hour during weekends.
