= Zugastieta station =

Railway station in Muxika, Basque Country, Spain

Zugastieta

General information
- Location: Muxika, Biscay; Spain
- Coordinates: 43°15′08″N 2°41′34″W
- Owner: Euskal Trenbide Sarea
- Operator: Euskotren
- Line: Line E4
- Platforms: 1 side platform, 1 island platform
- Tracks: 2

Construction
- Structure type: At-grade
- Parking: No
- Accessible: Partial

Other information
- Fare zone: Zone 4

History
- Opened: 13 August 1888

Services
Preceding station	Euskotren Trena	Following station
Amorebieta Geralekua towards Matiko	Line E4	Muxika towards Bermeo
Location

Zugastieta is a railway station in Muxika, Basque Country, Spain. It is owned by Euskal Trenbide Sarea and operated by Euskotren. It lies on the Urdaibai line.

== History ==
The station opened, together with the rest of the line between Amorebieta and Gernika, on 13 August 1888. The station building, which has been preserved, was designed by Pablo de Alzola and Luis de Landecho. A spur track to a nearby sawmill was added in 1946, it was removed in 1973 after being unused for several years. In 2018, the station was renovated in order to improve its accessibility.

== Services ==
The station is served by Euskotren Trena line E4. It runs every 30 minutes (in each direction) during weekdays, and every hour during weekends.
