= Urdaibai line =

Railway in the Basque Country, Spain

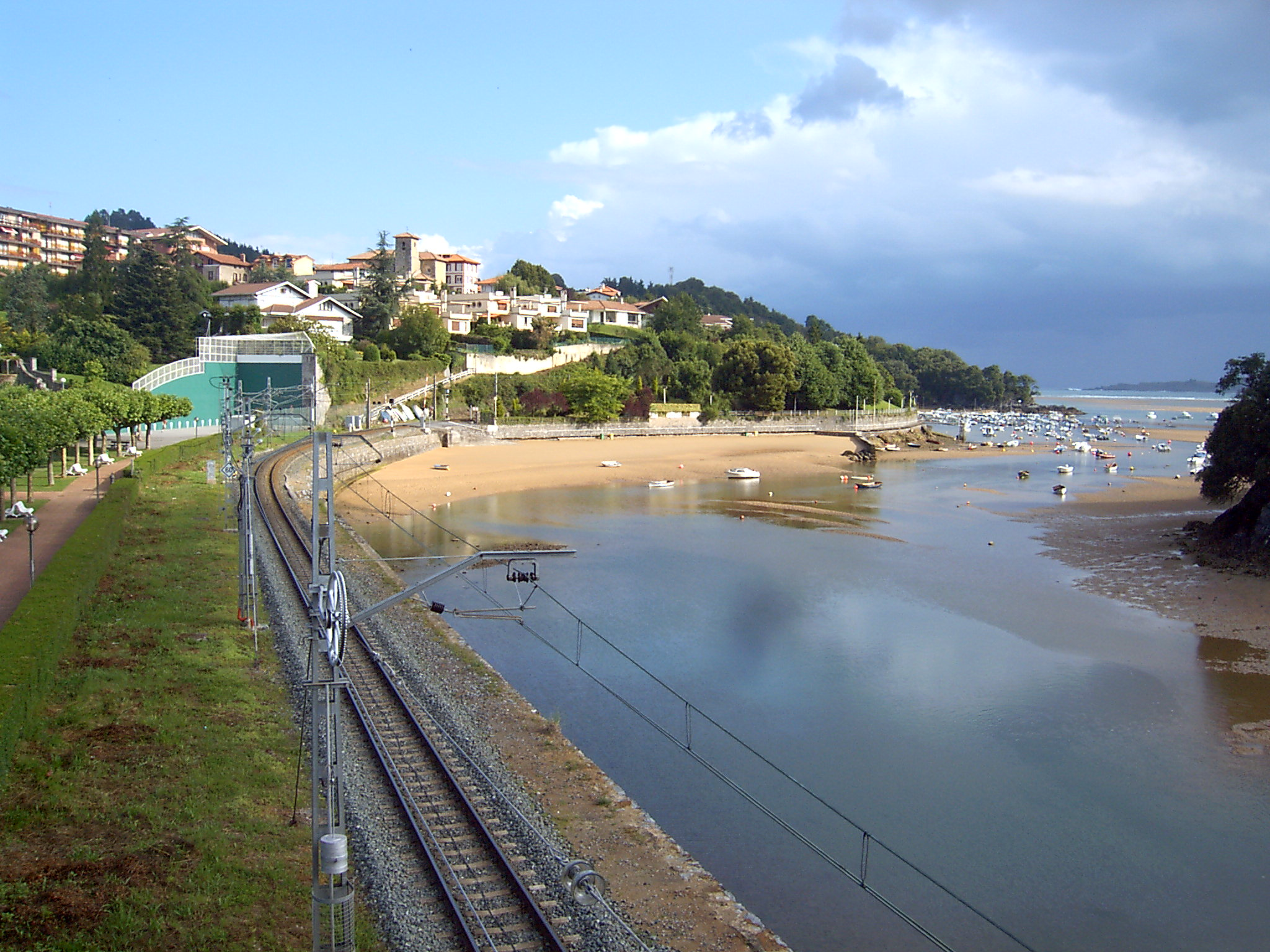
- The line in Sukarrieta.

Overview
- Status: Active
- Owner: Euskal Trenbide Sarea
- Locale: Biscay, Basque Country, Spain
- Termini: Amorebieta; Bermeo
- Stations: 13

History
- Opened: 13 August 1888

Technical
- Line length: 29.19 km (18.14 mi)
- Number of tracks: Single
- Track gauge: 1,000 mm (3 ft 3 3/8 in)
- Minimum radius: 150 m (490 ft)
- Electrification: 1,500 V DC overhead catenary
- Signalling: LZB

The Urdaibai line (Basque: Urdaibaiko linea, Spanish: Línea de Urdaibai), also known as the Amorebieta–Bermeo railway (Basque: Amorebieta-Bermeo trenbidea, Spanish: Ferrocarril Amorebieta-Bermeo) is a 29.19 km (18.14 mi) mostly single-track branchline in Biscay, Basque Country. Owned by Euskal Trenbide Sarea, it runs from Bermeo to Amorebieta, connecting with the Bilbao–San Sebastián mainline.

== History ==
=== Construction ===
The first narrow-gauge railway in Biscay, the Bilbao–Durango line, opened in 1882. That year, the government commissioned Francisco Rispa Perpiñá with the writing of the project for a railway between Gernika and Amorebieta, where it would link with the existing line. Already in the planning stages, an extension from Gernika to Bermeo was being considered. After several delays, the project was transferred to Luis de Landecho, who in 1885 received government approval for the construction of the railway. Works started that same year under the supervision of engineer Pablo de Alzola.

Three years later, the line opened to the public on 13 August 1888. On 15 March 1893, the line was extended to Pedernales (in Basque: Sukarrieta), only six months after the authorization for the construction was issued. This makes it likely that works on the extension had begun earlier, without government approval.

Since 1895, the extension to Bermeo had been under study. However, due to the rugged terrain, its construction was delayed. As a substitute, a horsecar linking Bermeo and Pedernales opened in 1896. This, coupled with the attempts made by the Lutxana–Mungia railway of reaching Bermeo, made the Amorebieta–Guernica–Pedernales railway abandon its plans for an extension.

=== Extension to Bermeo ===
Despite numerous proposals, the Mungia–Bermeo railway project ultimately didn't materialize due to the high costs involved. Ferrocarriles Vascongados tried to buy the Amorebieta–Pedernales railway, but didn't due to disagreements regarding the conditions of the purchase. After the failed takeover, relations between both companies worsened, and Ferrocarriles Vascongados actively pushed for the bankruptcy of the Amorebieta–Pedernales railway, by running direct buses to Bilbao. By the time this happened in 1932, Ferrocarriles Vascongados lacked the financial resources needed for the management of the railway. Thus, the line was taken over by the government, which managed it under the company Explotación de Ferrocarriles por el Estado.

After the civil war, the extension to Bermeo was considered again. On 27 March 1944, the Ministry of Public Works gave its approval to the project. Works started on 24 August that same year. The construction advanced slowly due to technical difficulties and lack of funds. The works were done by forced labor. From 1945 to 1953 most of the workers were political prisoners, but from that year common prisoners constituted the majority of the workforce.

The extension to Bermeo was finally inaugurated on 16 August 1955 by dictator Francisco Franco.

=== FEVE and Euskotren ===
In 1965, the railway was taken over by the new state-owned company FEVE. To improve its competitiveness, the company decided to electrify the line. Together with this, a new halt in Amorebieta and a direct connection towards Bilbao were built. This allowed for trains to run directly from Bilbao to Bermeo. The electrification entered service on 29 May 1973. The trains used to operate the line after the electrification were electric railcars that had belonged to the defunct Vasco-Navarro railway. In 1982 the newly created Basque Railways (known since 1996 as Euskotren) took over the line. During this time, modern 3500 series multiple units were introduced.

Starting in 1986, the line was renovated. This included the substitution of the wooden ties by concrete ones, and the construction of Lurgorri station to better serve Gernika. In 1996, 200 series trains entered service on the line. From 1997 to 1998 a freight service was operated jointly with FEVE from Bermeo to Lutxana, but had to be suspended due to increased passenger traffic. Starting in 2022, the Lamiaran viaduct (between Mundaka and Bermeo) will be renovated due to erosion.

== Service ==
E4 line

Overview
- Service type: Commuter/regional rail
- Current operator: Euskotren
- Ridership: 994,095 (2018)

Route
- Termini: Matiko; Bermeo
- Service frequency: 2 per hour (weekdays); 1 per hour (weekends)
- Lines used: Line 3 (Bilbao Metro); Bilbao–San Sebastián; Urdaibai

Technical
- Rolling stock: Euskotren 900, 950 series

The only service operating on the Urdaibai line is Euskotren Trena line E4. Operated by Euskotren, it provides a twice hourly service from Bermeo to Bilbao. The service frequency is hourly on weekends. Some of the services in the early morning/late evening only run to or from Gernika. On weekdays there's also a semi-direct train from Gernika to Bilbao that skips most of the stops.

From Bermeo to Amorebieta, trains use the Urdaibai line. There, they join the Bilbao–San Sebastián mainline until Kukullaga. Until 2019, the terminus in Bilbao was the historic Atxuri station. That year, trains on the E4 line started running through Line 3 of the Bilbao Metro, with the new terminus becoming Matiko.

=== Station list ===
The following table shows regular service patterns. The first trains in the morning and the last in the evening make shorter trips.

Trains stop at stations marked with "●" and don't stop at those marked with "｜":

| Station | Stops | | | Location |
| Station | Daytime | Semi-direct | Night | Location |
|---|---|---|---|---|
| Matiko | ● | ● | | Bilbao |
| Uribarri | ● | ● | | Bilbao |
| Zazpikaleak/Casco Viejo | ● | ● | | Bilbao |
| Zurbaranbarri | ● | ● | | Bilbao |
| Txurdinaga | ● | ● | | Bilbao |
| Otxarkoaga | ● | ● | | Bilbao |
| Kukullaga | ● | ● | | Etxebarri |
| Etxebarri | ● | ｜ | | Etxebarri |
| Ariz | ● | ｜ | | Basauri |
| Zuhatzu | ● | ｜ | | Galdakao |
| Usansolo | ● | ｜ | | Galdakao |
| Bedia | ● | ｜ | | Bedia |
| Lemoa | ● | ｜ | | Lemoa |
| Amorebieta | ｜ | ｜ | ● | Amorebieta-Etxano |
| Amorebieta Geralekua | ● | ● | ｜ | Amorebieta-Etxano |
| Zugastieta | ● | ｜ | ● | Muxika |
| Muxika | ● | ｜ | ● | Muxika |
| Lurgorri | ● | ● | ｜ | Gernika-Lumo |
| Gernika | ● | ● | ● | Gernika-Lumo |
| Institutoa | ● | | ｜ | Gernika-Lumo |
| Forua | ● | | ● | Forua |
| San Kristobal | ● | | ● | Busturia |
| Axpe | ● | | ● | Busturia |
| Itsasbegi | ● | | ● | Busturia |
| Mundaka | ● | | ● | Mundaka |
| Bermeo | ● | | ● | Bermeo |
