= Axpe station =

Railway station in Busturia, Basque Country, Spain

Axpe

General information
- Location: Busturia, Biscay; Spain
- Coordinates: 43°22′49″N 2°41′35″W
- Owner: Euskal Trenbide Sarea
- Operator: Euskotren
- Line: Line E4
- Platforms: 1 side platform
- Tracks: 1

Construction
- Structure type: At-grade
- Parking: No
- Accessible: Yes

Other information
- Fare zone: Zone 4

History
- Opened: 15 March 1893

Services
Preceding station	Euskotren Trena	Following station
San Kristobal towards Matiko	Line E4	Itsasbegi towards Bermeo
Location

Axpe is a railway station in Busturia, Basque Country, Spain. It is owned by Euskal Trenbide Sarea and operated by Euskotren. It lies on the Urdaibai line.

== History ==
The station opened, together with the rest of the Gernika-Pedernales extension of the Amorebieta-Gernika line, on 15 March 1893. The current station building dates from 1943. Built in the neo-Basque style, it is very similar to the former Retana station, built around the same time.

== Services ==
The station is served by Euskotren Trena line E4. It runs every 30 minutes (in each direction) during weekdays, and every hour during weekends.
