= Forua station =

Railway station in Forua, Basque Country, Spain

Forua

General information
- Location: Forua, Biscay; Spain
- Coordinates: 43°19′57″N 2°40′24″W
- Owner: Euskal Trenbide Sarea
- Operator: Euskotren
- Line: Line E4
- Platforms: 1 side platform
- Tracks: 1

Construction
- Structure type: At-grade
- Parking: No
- Accessible: Yes

Other information
- Fare zone: Zone 4

History
- Opened: 15 March 1893

Services
Preceding station	Euskotren Trena	Following station
Institutoa towards Matiko	Line E4	San Kristobal towards Bermeo
Location

Forua is a railway station in Forua, Basque Country, Spain. It is owned by Euskal Trenbide Sarea and operated by Euskotren. It lies on the Urdaibai line.

== History ==
The station opened, together with the rest of the Gernika-Pedernales extension of the Amorebieta-Gernika line, on 15 March 1893. The original station building was demolished in the 1990s due to its bad condition, and replaced by a shelter. In 2018, the station was renovated in order to improve its accessibility.

== Services ==
The station is served by Euskotren Trena line E4. It runs every 30 minutes (in each direction) during weekdays, and every hour during weekends.
