= Amorebieta Geralekua station =

Railway station in Amorebieta-Etxano, Basque Country, Spain

Amorebieta Geralekua

General information
- Location: Amorebieta-Etxano, Biscay; Spain
- Coordinates: 43°13′18″N 2°44′06″W
- Owner: Euskal Trenbide Sarea
- Operator: Euskotren
- Line: Line E4
- Platforms: 2 side platforms
- Tracks: 1

Construction
- Structure type: At-grade
- Parking: No
- Accessible: Yes

Other information
- Fare zone: Zone 3

History
- Rebuilt: 18 June 1973

Services
Preceding station	Euskotren Trena	Following station
Lemoa towards Matiko	Line E4	Zugastieta towards Bermeo
Location

Amorebieta Geralekua (Basque for 'Amorebieta Halt') is a railway station in Amorebieta-Etxano, Basque Country, Spain. It is owned by Euskal Trenbide Sarea and operated by Euskotren. It lies on the Urdaibai line.

== History ==
A halt had existed in the location of the current station at least before the civil war, but it was closed on an unknown date. The current station opened in 1973, together with the chord that allowed trains from Bilbao to enter the Urdaibai line directly from the Bilbao–San Sebastián line without the need to reverse at Amorebieta station. The station has a single track with side platforms on both sides, but normally only one of them is in use.

== Services ==
The station is served by Euskotren Trena line E4. It runs every 30 minutes (in each direction) during weekdays, and every hour during weekends.
