= Zuhatzu station =

Railway station in Galdakao, Basque Country, Spain

Zuhatzu
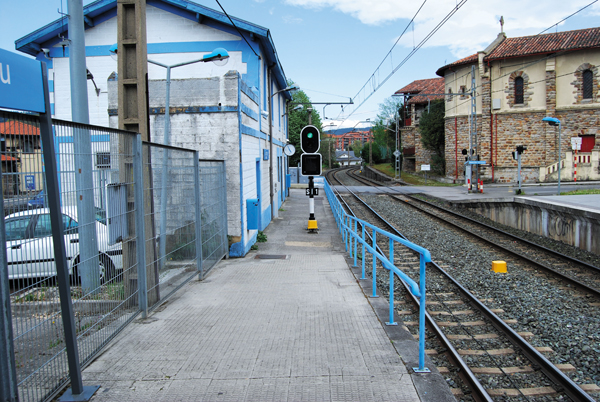
- View of the station in 2009

General information
- Location: Galdakao, Biscay; Spain
- Coordinates: 43°14′N 2°51′W
- Owner: Euskal Trenbide Sarea
- Operator: Euskotren
- Lines: Line E1; Line E4
- Platforms: 2 side platforms
- Tracks: 2

Construction
- Structure type: At-grade
- Parking: Yes
- Accessible: Yes

Other information
- Fare zone: Zone 2

History
- Opened: 1 July 1882

Services
Preceding station	Euskotren Trena	Following station
Ariz towards Matiko	Line E1	Usansolo towards Pasaia
Ariz towards Matiko	Line E4	Usansolo towards Bermeo
Location

Zuhatzu is a railway station in Galdakao, Basque Country, Spain. It is owned by Euskal Trenbide Sarea and operated by Euskotren. It lies on the Bilbao–San Sebastián line.

== History ==
The station opened as part of the Bilbao-Durango line in 1882.

== Services ==
The station is served by Euskotren Trena lines E1 and E4. Each of them runs every 30 minutes (in each direction) during weekdays, and every hour during weekends.
