= Jon Azkueta =

Basque romance author

- Born: Jon Azkueta Castro; 3 May 1998 (age 28); Usansolo (Basque Country); Spain
- Education: Ánima Eskola School of Drama; University of the Basque Country (BA)
- Occupations: Novelist, teacher
- Relatives: Cristina Castro (mother); Jon Azkueta Legarreta (father)
- Writing career
- Years active: 2013–present
- Genres: Romance; Young adult Young adult romance

Jon Azkueta Castro (born in Usansolo on 3 May 1998) is a Basque author of romance novels in the young adult fiction genre.

Azkueta made his debut in the young adult fiction genre on the Wattpad platform and later in paper with the Crossbooks publishing house (Grupo Planeta), with which she published the novels 69 segundos para conquistarte (2022), Huyendo del vicio (2023), El último amanecer de agosto (2024) or The Thirteen Seashells (2026).

== Early life and education ==
Jon Azkueta Castro was born in Usansolo (Basque Country) on 3 May 1998. He is the son of Olympic athletes Cristina Castro and Jon Azkueta Legarreta. He is the brother of pelota player Egoitz Azkueta Castro.

Azkueta studied a bachelor's degree in primary education at the University of the Basque Country. He has worked as a bookseller and as a teacher. He is also trained as a film and television screenwriter.

In addition, Azkueta also trained as an actor. He studied at the Ánima Eskola School of Drama, where he trained in theatre with Sandra Tejero. In 2014 he participated in the stage production Miau, Miau, a musical theatre based on Cats, directed by Spanish stage director Sandra Tejero and staged at the Campos Elíseos Theatre (Bilbao). In 2014 he co-starred in the series Mucha Mierda!, alongside Unai Elizalde or Naroa Capel, playing the role of Iker, a romantic comedy in the world of theatre, directed by Eriz Cerezo and Iker Mendaza.

== Career ==
He began writing on the Wattpad platform, where he wrote stories and stories. At the age of 16 he wrote 69 seconds to conquer you (69 segundos para conquistarte), which he published on Wattpad and had a notable impact. He then published Fleeing from vice (Huyendo del vicio), also on Wattpad, which he began writing at the age of 18 and began as a story, but continued to develop until it became a novel. He began writing Fleeing from vice in the summer of 2016, while spending the summer in Trespaderne (Burgos), a place that is the setting of the story. In total, his novels have accumulated almost three million readers on Wattpad. He won the Watty Award in 2017 and in 2020.

Due to the success of his novels on Wattpad, the novels 69 seconds to conquer you (69 segundos para conquistarte) and Fleeing from vice (Huyendo del vicio) were acquired by Crossbooks publishing house (Grupo Planeta) for publication in paper form, becoming the first Wattpad boy to sign for a large publishing house in Spain.

In the year 2024, the novel The Last Dawn of August (El último amanecer de agosto) was published, published both on Wattpad and on paper. Unlike his previous novels, which he wrote as a teenager, The Last Dawn of August was the first novel written as an adult.

Since 2024, Azkueta is a contributor to the Boulevard radio program on Radio Euskadi (EITB Media), contributing to a section on literature and current novels.

== Books ==
=== Published in paper ===
- 2022, 69 segundos para conquistarte, Crossbooks (Planeta)
- 2023, Huyendo del vicio, Crossbooks (Planeta)
- 2024, El último amanecer de agosto, Crossbooks (Planeta)
- 2026, The Thirteen Seashells, Crossbooks (Planeta)

=== On Wattpad ===
- Joder…otro muerto más
- Verony
- La librería de la Ría
- Rewind X
- Huyendo del vicio
- 69 segundos para conquistarte

== Radio ==
- 2024–present, Boulevard, Radio Euskadi (EITB Media)

== Filmography ==
=== TV Series ===
- 2014, Mucha Mierda!, (Role – Iker)

== Awards ==
- 2020, Watty Award (Wattpad)
- 2017, Watty Award (Wattpad)

== See also ==
- Wattpad
- Sandra Tejero
