= Institutoa station =

Railway station in Gernika, Basque Country, Spain

Institutoa

General information
- Location: Gernika, Biscay; Spain
- Coordinates: 43°19′11″N 2°40′37″W
- Owner: Euskal Trenbide Sarea
- Operator: Euskotren
- Line: Line E4
- Platforms: 1 side platform
- Tracks: 1

Construction
- Structure type: At-grade
- Parking: Yes
- Accessible: Partial

Other information
- Fare zone: Zone 4

History
- Opened: 1938
- Rebuilt: 1969

Services
Preceding station	Euskotren Trena	Following station
Gernika towards Matiko	Line E4	Forua towards Bermeo
Location

Institutoa is a railway station in Gernika, Basque Country, Spain. It is owned by Euskal Trenbide Sarea and operated by Euskotren. It lies on the Urdaibai line.

== History ==
The current station was built by FEVE (the operator of the line at the time) in 1969 to serve a high school in the area. A halt had been built in the same location in 1938 to serve a nearby hospital-prison.

== Services ==
The station is served by Euskotren Trena line E4. It runs every 30 minutes (in each direction) during weekdays, and every hour during weekends.
