= Lurgorri station =

Railway station in Gernika, Basque Country, Spain

Lurgorri

General information
- Location: Gernika, Biscay; Spain
- Coordinates: 43°18′24″N 2°40′49″W
- Owner: Euskal Trenbide Sarea
- Operator: Euskotren
- Line: Line E4
- Platforms: 1 side platform
- Tracks: 1

Construction
- Structure type: At-grade
- Parking: No
- Accessible: Partial

Other information
- Fare zone: Zone 4

History
- Opened: 1988

Services
Preceding station	Euskotren Trena	Following station
Muxika towards Matiko	Line E4	Gernika towards Bermeo
Location

Lurgorri is a railway station in Gernika, Basque Country, Spain. It is owned by Euskal Trenbide Sarea and operated by Euskotren. It lies on the Urdaibai line.

== History ==
The station wasn't part of the line when it opened in 1888. It was built by Euskotren in 1988 to better serve the new developments in the southern part of the town.

== Services ==
The station is served by Euskotren Trena line E4. It runs every 30 minutes (in each direction) during weekdays, and every hour during weekends.
