= Bedia station =

Railway station in Bedia, Basque Country, Spain

Bedia
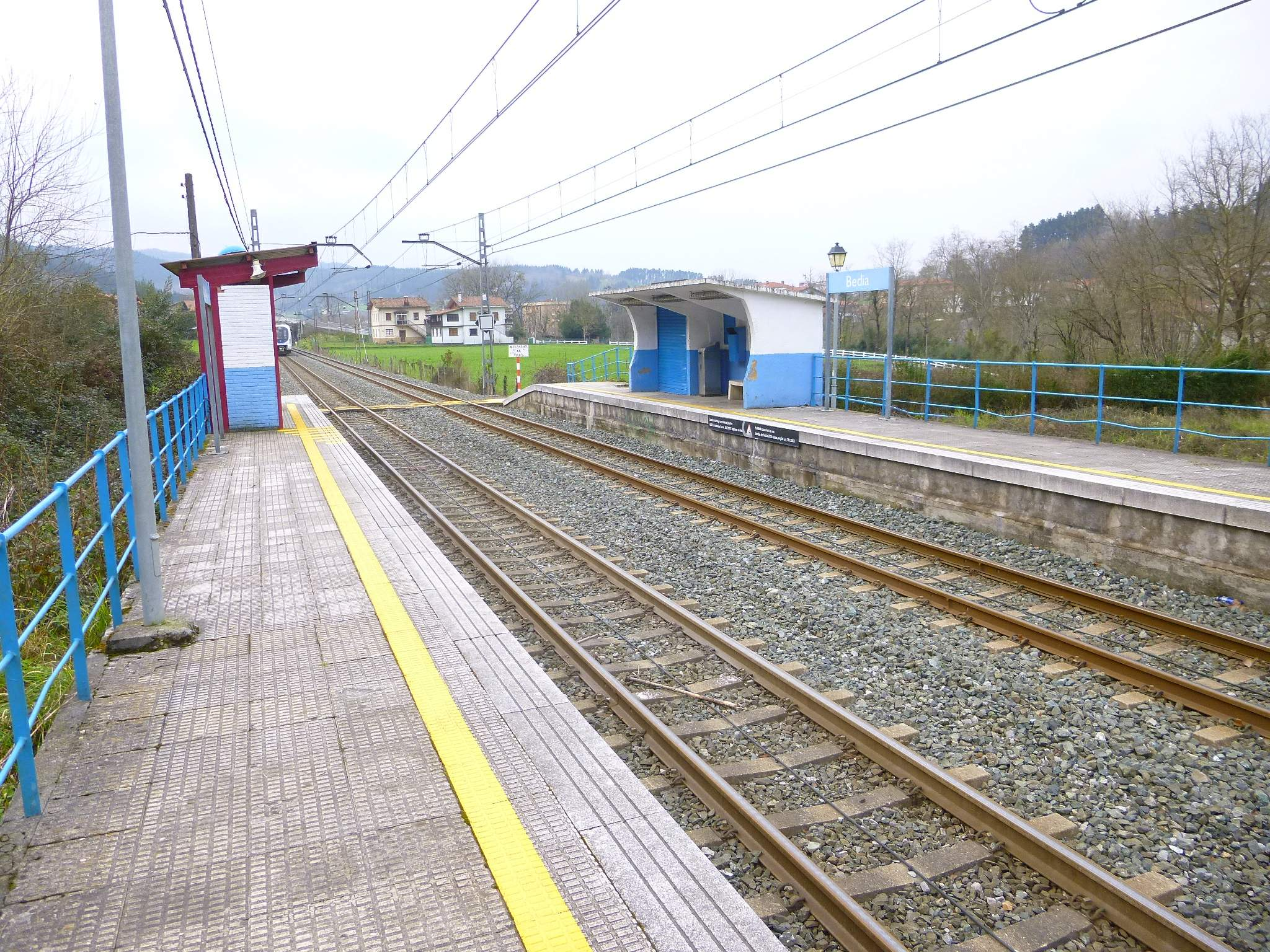
- View of the station

General information
- Location: Bedia, Biscay; Spain
- Coordinates: 43°12′22″N 2°47′53″W
- Owner: Euskal Trenbide Sarea
- Operator: Euskotren
- Lines: Line E1; Line E4
- Platforms: 2 side platforms
- Tracks: 2

Construction
- Structure type: At-grade
- Parking: No
- Accessible: No

Other information
- Fare zone: Zone 3

History
- Opened: 1 July 1882

Services
Preceding station	Euskotren Trena	Following station
Usansolo towards Matiko	Line E1	Lemoa towards Pasaia
Usansolo towards Matiko	Line E4	Lemoa towards Bermeo
Location

Bedia is a railway station in Bedia, Basque Country, Spain. It is owned by Euskal Trenbide Sarea and operated by Euskotren. It lies on the Bilbao–San Sebastián line.

== History ==
The station opened as part of the Bilbao-Durango line in 1882.

== Services ==
The station is served by Euskotren Trena lines E1 and E4. Each of them runs every 30 minutes (in each direction) during weekdays, and every hour during weekends.
