= Lemoa station =

Railway station in Lemoa, Basque Country, Spain

Lemoa
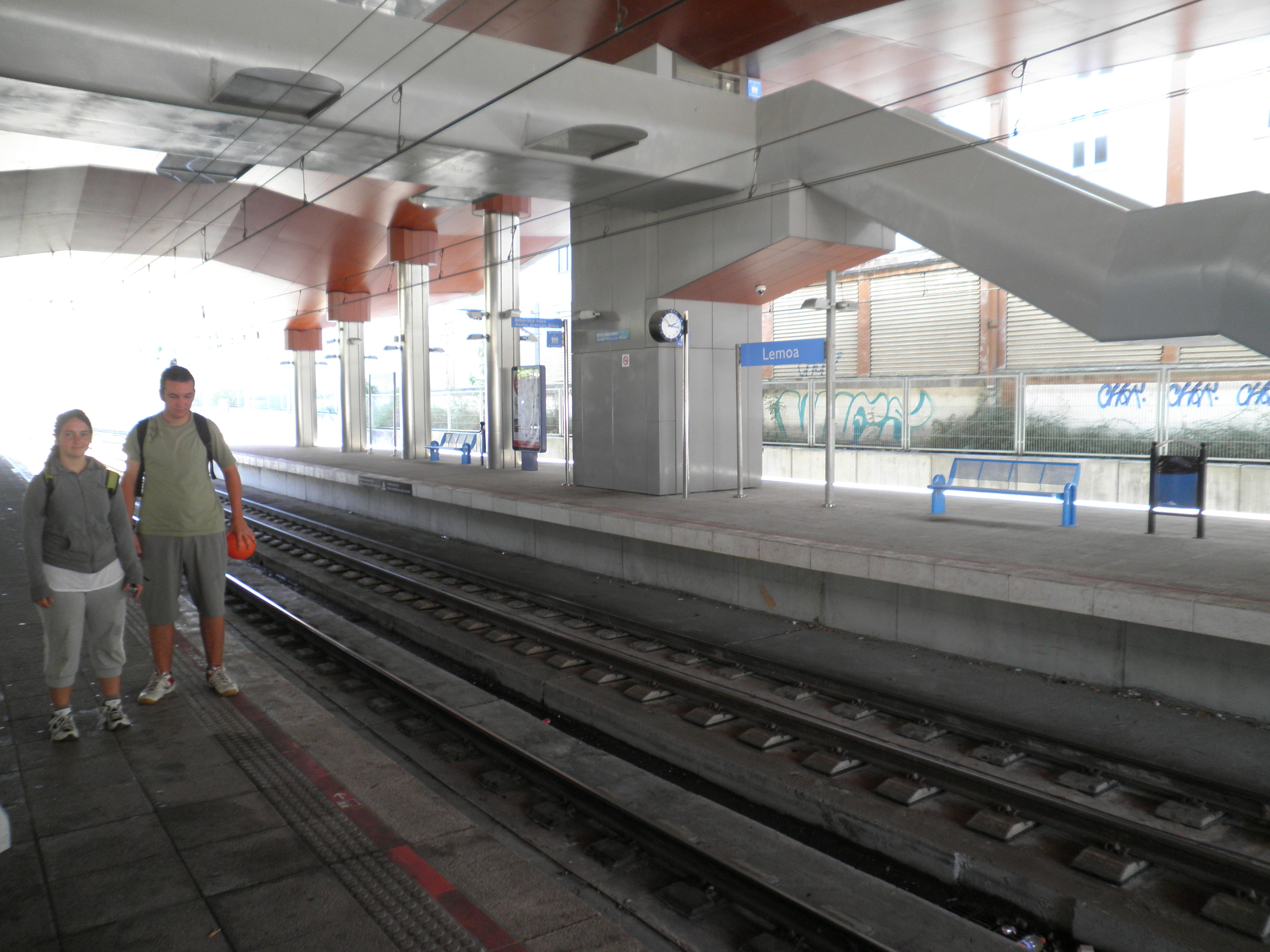
- Station interior in 2011

General information
- Location: Lemoa, Biscay; Spain
- Coordinates: 43°12′26″N 2°46′32″W
- Owner: Euskal Trenbide Sarea
- Operator: Euskotren
- Lines: Line E1; Line E4
- Platforms: 1 island platform, 1 side platform
- Tracks: 3

Construction
- Structure type: At-grade
- Parking: No
- Accessible: Yes

Other information
- Fare zone: Zone 3

History
- Opened: 1 July 1882
- Rebuilt: 2008

Services
Preceding station	Euskotren Trena	Following station
Bedia towards Matiko	Line E1	Amorebieta towards Pasaia
Bedia towards Matiko	Line E4	Amorebieta Geralekua towards Bermeo
Location

Lemoa is a railway station in Lemoa, Basque Country, Spain. It is owned by Euskal Trenbide Sarea and operated by Euskotren. It lies on the Bilbao–San Sebastián line.

== History ==
The station opened as part of the Bilbao-Durango line in 1882. Passenger traffic increased notably after 1913, when an interchange with the interurban Arratia tram was built. A Cementos Portland cement factory adjacent to the station was an important source of freight traffic starting in the 1920s. In December 2004, works on the rebuilding of the station and the removal of a nearby level crossing started. The level crossing was removed in 2006, and the new station opened in 2008.

== Services ==
The station is served by Euskotren Trena lines E1 and E4. Each of them runs every 30 minutes (in each direction) during weekdays, and every hour during weekends.
