= Usansolo station =

Railway station in Galdakao, Basque Country, Spain

Usansolo
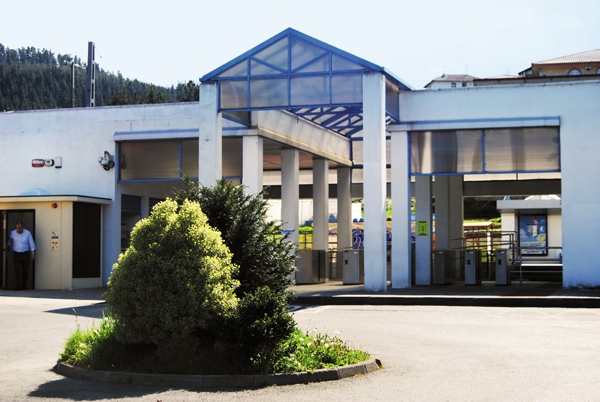
- Entrance to the station

General information
- Location: Usansolo, Biscay; Spain
- Coordinates: 43°13′04″N 2°49′18″W
- Owner: Euskal Trenbide Sarea
- Operator: Euskotren
- Lines: Line E1; Line E4
- Platforms: 2 side platforms
- Tracks: 2

Construction
- Structure type: At-grade
- Parking: No
- Accessible: Yes

Other information
- Fare zone: Zone 2

History
- Opened: 1 July 1882

Services
Preceding station	Euskotren Trena	Following station
Zuhatzu towards Matiko	Line E1	Bedia towards Pasaia
Zuhatzu towards Matiko	Line E4	Bedia towards Bermeo
Location

Usansolo is a railway station in Usansolo, Basque Country, Spain. It is owned by Euskal Trenbide Sarea and operated by Euskotren. It lies on the Bilbao–San Sebastián line.

== History ==
The station opened as part of the Bilbao-Durango line in 1882.

== Services ==
The station is served by Euskotren Trena lines E1 and E4. Each of them runs every 30 minutes (in each direction) during weekdays, and every hour during weekends. A bus service run by Euskotren links the station with Galdakao-Usansolo Hospital.
