= Ariz station =

Railway station in Basauri, Basque Country, Spain

Ariz
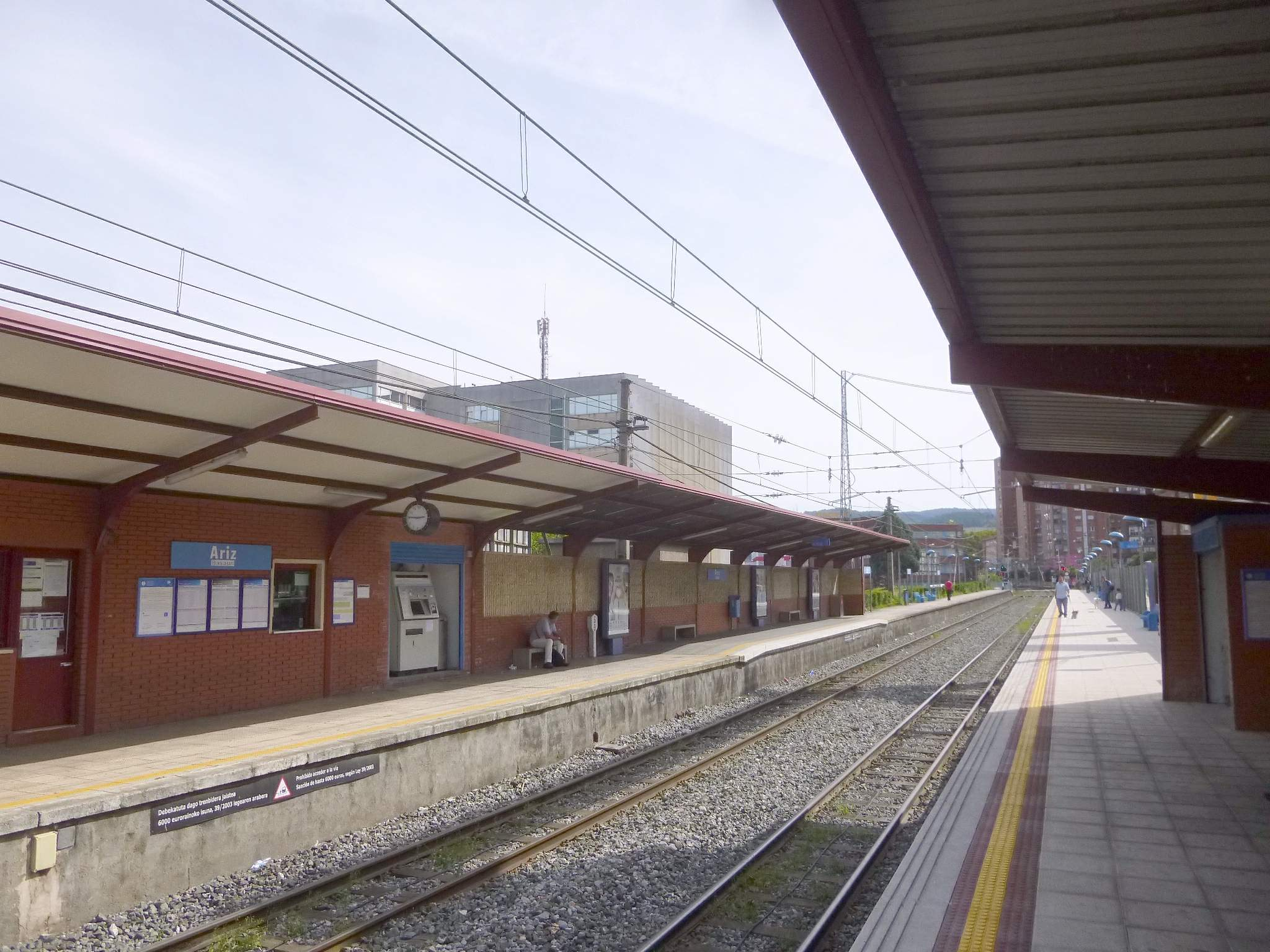
- View of the platforms in 2016

General information
- Location: Basauri, Biscay; Spain
- Coordinates: 43°14′25″N 2°52′45″W
- Owner: Euskal Trenbide Sarea
- Operator: Euskotren
- Lines: Line E1; Line E4
- Platforms: 2 side platforms
- Tracks: 2

Construction
- Structure type: At-grade
- Parking: Yes
- Accessible: Yes

Other information
- Fare zone: Zone 2

History
- Opened: 1 July 1882

Services
Preceding station	Euskotren Trena	Following station
Etxebarri towards Matiko	Line E1	Zuhatzu towards Pasaia
Etxebarri towards Matiko	Line E4	Zuhatzu towards Bermeo
Location

Ariz is a railway station in Basauri, Basque Country, Spain. It is owned by Euskal Trenbide Sarea and operated by Euskotren. It lies on the Bilbao–San Sebastián line.

== History ==
The station opened as part of the Bilbao-Durango line in 1882. The station is also the eastern terminus of the Ariz–Basurto line, used by freight trains. Thus, aside from the passenger facilities, the station has a freight terminal.

== Services ==
The station is served by Euskotren Trena lines E1 and E4. Each of them runs every 30 minutes (in each direction) during weekdays, and every hour during weekends.
