= Sergio Mena =

Spanish journalist

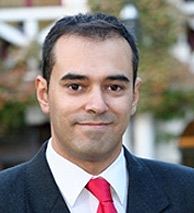
- Portrait of Professor Sergio Mena at Universidad Nebrija's front
- Born: Sergio Mena Muñoz; 9 July 1975 (age 51); Madrid, Spain
- Occupations: Journalist, University Professor
- Years active: 1997–present
- Website: www.menasergio.es

Sergio Mena (born July 9, 1975) is a Spanish journalist and university professor.

== Biography ==
Born in Madrid, Spain, on July 9, 1975, Mena has a Ph.D. in Journalism from the Complutense University in Madrid with the thesis Structure and Programming of Multimedia Channels of Public Transport: The Spanish Case (2000–2007) ISBN 978-84-694-2682-1, tutored by Luis Miguel Martínez Fernández. Since 2012 He is studying a Ph.D. in Contemporary History at the Autonomous University of Madrid, investigating the representation and interpretation of World War II in American Cinema with the thesis The Pacific War at American Cinema. Representation and Interpretation of a Historical Event (1941-1991) tutored by Carmen de la Guardia. He studied at the Nebrija University in Madrid, where he majored in Journalism (1999) and Communication Studies (2002).

He has been a "Profesor asociado" (part-time instructor, non tenured position, not a civil servant) of Journalism at the Nebrija University and has taught courses and workshops on audiovisual and communication issues. He has participated in several research groups and collaborates with the Journal of Communication and Health (RCyS).

He has developed his work as a journalist on Radio, Internet and Television Media. He began his career in Canal 7, where he presented news programs. From there he went to the magazine Más Madrid, where he was a photographer and then to Televisión Española, where he worked on the program En otras palabras and Por la mañana. After several years as head of TV and radio studios of the Nebrija University, came to work at Radio Intereconomía in the program Capital. He went on to Intereconomía TV as a writer and then to the web pages www.intereconomia.com and www.negocios. com. He has been host of program Capital Tecnología.

After creating his blog A vueltas con la tecnología (A turns to technology), he currently is writing its sequel A (re)vueltas con la tecnología (A (re)turns to technology)

He has been editor of the web www.ejercitodelaire.mde.es

Member of the Madrid Press Association and the Spanish Association of Research Communication.

== Publications and conferences ==
- "Measuring the Time of Effectiveness of Tweets: Interest and Information Life at the Age of Social Networking" (in Spanish). 2nd National Conference on Research Methodology in Communication: Communication Research Today. Review of Scientific and Methodological Contributions Policies. Valladolid: Faculty of Social Sciences, Law and Communication, 2013, p. 173-184. ISBN 978-84-616-4124-6
- "TV at The Internet. Introduction and Prognosis of a Revolution in Audio Visual Market". Ámbitos. Revista internacional de Comunicación. nª.22, 2013. ISSN 1139-1979.
- "Information and Entertainment Channels at Underground and Buses Systems in Spain" (in Spanish). Studies About Journalistic Message Review ISSN 1134-1629, Nº 17(2), pages 531 to 548.
- "Television and Audience Response: YouTube, comments as a tool of evaluation and its limits". 5th. International Congress on Web Journalism: Participation, Social Networks and Cybermedia. Universidad Complutense de Madrid. Madrid. November 16, 2011.
- "Determining the Degree of Accordance Effect with the Screens of Subway Stations Media Channels" (in Spanish). 1st. National Congress on Research Methodology in Communication. Communication Research in Spain: Projects, Methodologies and Dissemination of Results. AE-IC, King Juan Carlos University. Fuenlabrada. Madrid. April 14, 2011. ISBN 978-84-694-2713-2
- "Spain and the Information Society, following the Nordic Model" (in Spanish).(Review) Information Society and Knowledge in the Nordic Countries. Similarities and differences with the Spanish case. Mariano Cebrián Herreros (Dir.) Enseñanza & Teaching, Vol. 28, 1-2010, pages 213 to 218. ISSN 0212-5374 – CDU 37
- "Cyberjournalism and Economic Expertise in Finance Portals" (in Spanish). Latin Social Communication Review ISSN 1138-5820, Nº. 64, 2009.
- "Internet on TV: Actions to Transform the Last Bastion of Traditional Media" (in Spanish). VII Ibero-American Biennial of Communication. Knowledge, Reality and Culture Media. Equity in Communications and Digital Corporates. September 23, 24 and 25 2009. Chihuahua, Mexico.
- "Video On Demand On Line: The Effective Disappearance of Traditional Video Stores" (in Spanish). IX Latin American Congress of Communication (The Ibero-American Media in the Digital Age). Sevilla-Cádiz November 15–18, 2006. ISBN 978-84-472-1154-8
- "Synergies in Digital Media: Open Programming As A Business" (in Spanish). IV Nebrija Cyberjournalism International Congress. La Berzosa (Madrid). March 14, 15 2005. Pages 39 to 56. ISBN 978-84-935587-0-3

== Awards ==
- Best Screenplay. VI AdN Short Film Festival. Madrid, May 2004.
- Finalist II ASIMELEC Journalism Award

== Short films ==
- «La Pantalla» (The Screen, 2004. co-directed with Marcos Ripalda)
