= Mónica Domínguez Blanco =

Spanish journalist (1984–2022)

- Born: 14 May 1984; Ponferrada, Spain
- Died: 31 July 2022 (aged 38); Ponferrada, Spain
- Occupation: Journalist

Mónica Domínguez Blanco (14 May 1984 – 31 July 2022) was a Spanish journalist, well known for her work in the television program Viajeros Cuatro.

== Early life and education ==
Domínguez was born on 14 May 1984 in Ponferrada and during her life, she spent a lot of time in Flores del Sil, a neighborhood with which she built a bond due to her mother and grandparents. She graduated from Nebrija University in 2007 with a degree in journalism, and also attended Lock Haven University.

== Career ==
Domínguez began her career in 2006 in El Bierzo, in a local radio station called Bierzo Suena, where she worked until she made the move to television in 2011, with El Programa de Ana Rosa on Telecinco. Later, she would work as an editor and reporter on Divinity está de moda on Divinity, Las Mañanas de Cuatro on Cuatro, and from 2012 to 2015, Hay una cosa que te quiero decir on Telecinco.

In 2015, Domínguez worked as an editor and reporter for Pokerstars and as director and presenter of a daily magazine on RTV Castilla y León. After her time on "¡Qué tiempo tan feliz!", "Hazte un selfie" and "Dani&Flo", in 2018 she devoted her career to the Cuatro television program 'Viajeros Cuatro', combining it with the work of reporter in "Ya es mediodía" and "Cuatro al día".

== Death ==
Domínguez died of cancer on 31 July 2022, at the age of 38.
