= Ariz–Basurto line =

Railway in the Basque Country, Spain

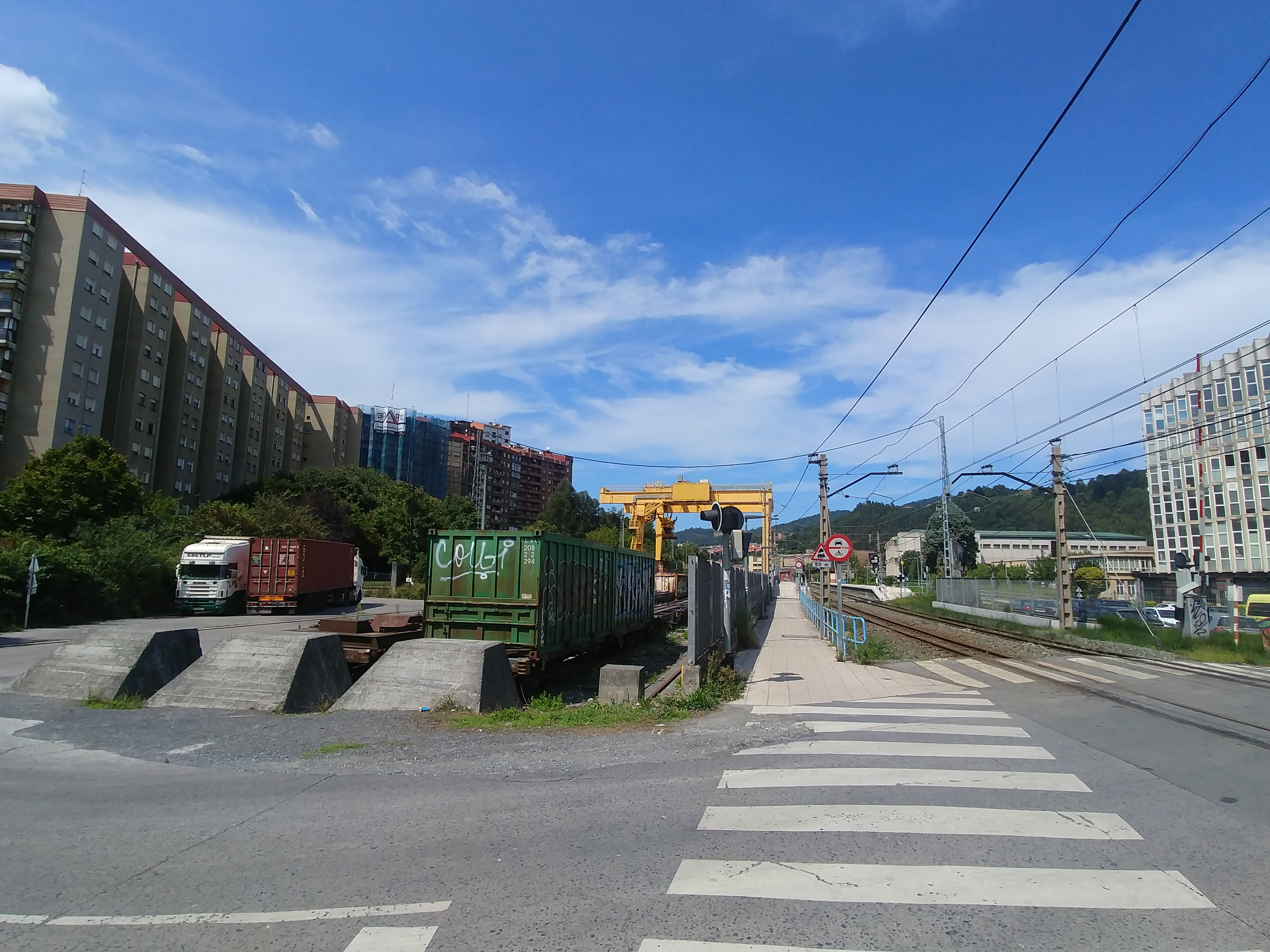
- View of the freight yard adjacent to Ariz station

Overview
- Status: Active
- Owner: Euskal Trenbide Sarea
- Locale: Biscay, Basque Country, Spain
- Termini: Ariz; Basurto-Hospital

History
- Opened: 7 January 1906

Technical
- Line length: 7.363 km (4.575 mi)
- Number of tracks: Single
- Track gauge: 1,000 mm (3 ft 3 3/8 in)

The Ariz–Basurto line (Basque: Ariz-Basurto trenbidea, Spanish: Ferrocarril Ariz-Basurto) is a short single-track unelectrified railway line in Biscay, Basque Country, Spain. Owned by Euskal Trenbide Sarea, it connects the Basque narrow-gauge railway network with the Santander–Bilbao line. It is used for freight transport.

== History ==
On 2 August 1897 the government awarded the concession for a narrow-gauge railway between La Industrial (in Basurto) and Azbarren. The line opened in its entirety on 7 January 1906, connecting the Bilbao–San Sebastián and Santander–Bilbao line lines. Negotiations between the Santander–Bilbao Railway Company and Ferrocarriles Vascongados (the operator of the Bilbao–San Sebastián line) to establish a joint passenger service started in 1904. The negotiations proved difficult, and it wasn't until the opening of the San Sebastián–Hendaye line in 1912 that a joint service was inaugurated, running from Hendaye to Oviedo via San Sebastián, Bilbao and Santander. This service was short-lived, as the outbreak of World War I caused its suspension in 1914. Regular passenger service between San Sebastián and Santander wasn't restored after the end of the war.

Ariz, a station close to the terminus of the line at Azbarren, was also the starting point of a branchline that connected the Ferrocarriles Vascongados network with the broad-gauge Tudela–Bilbao railway at Dos Caminos. In 1918 a new line opened from Azbarren to Matiko, linking the Bilbao–San Sebastián line with the Bilbao–Plentzia railway. In the 1920s Ariz had eight tracks while nearby Azbarren had four. By the late 1950s freight traffic levels were falling. The Matiko–Azbarren line had to be closed in 1969 due to the collapse of a tunnel, while the branchline to Dos Caminos closed in 1970 due to low traffic. The line from Basurto to Ariz remained open, and in the 1970s a new freight yard was built by FEVE in Ariz.

In 2016, after four years of works, the line was put underground in Bilbao. The urban section through Iralabarri was replaced by a cut-and-cover tunnel, while the old tunnel under Miribilla was replaced by a new one. The Constitutional Court ruled in 2016 that the Ariz–Basurto and Irauregi–Lutxana lines had to be transferred from the Adif-operated Red Ferroviaria de Interés General to Euskal Trenbide Sarea, since they run entirely within the Basque Country. The transfer of the two lines took place in December 2018. In 2023, the Basque Government made public a proposal to cover the line in Basauri.
