= Itsasbegi station =

Railway station in Busturia, Basque Country, Spain

Itsasbegi
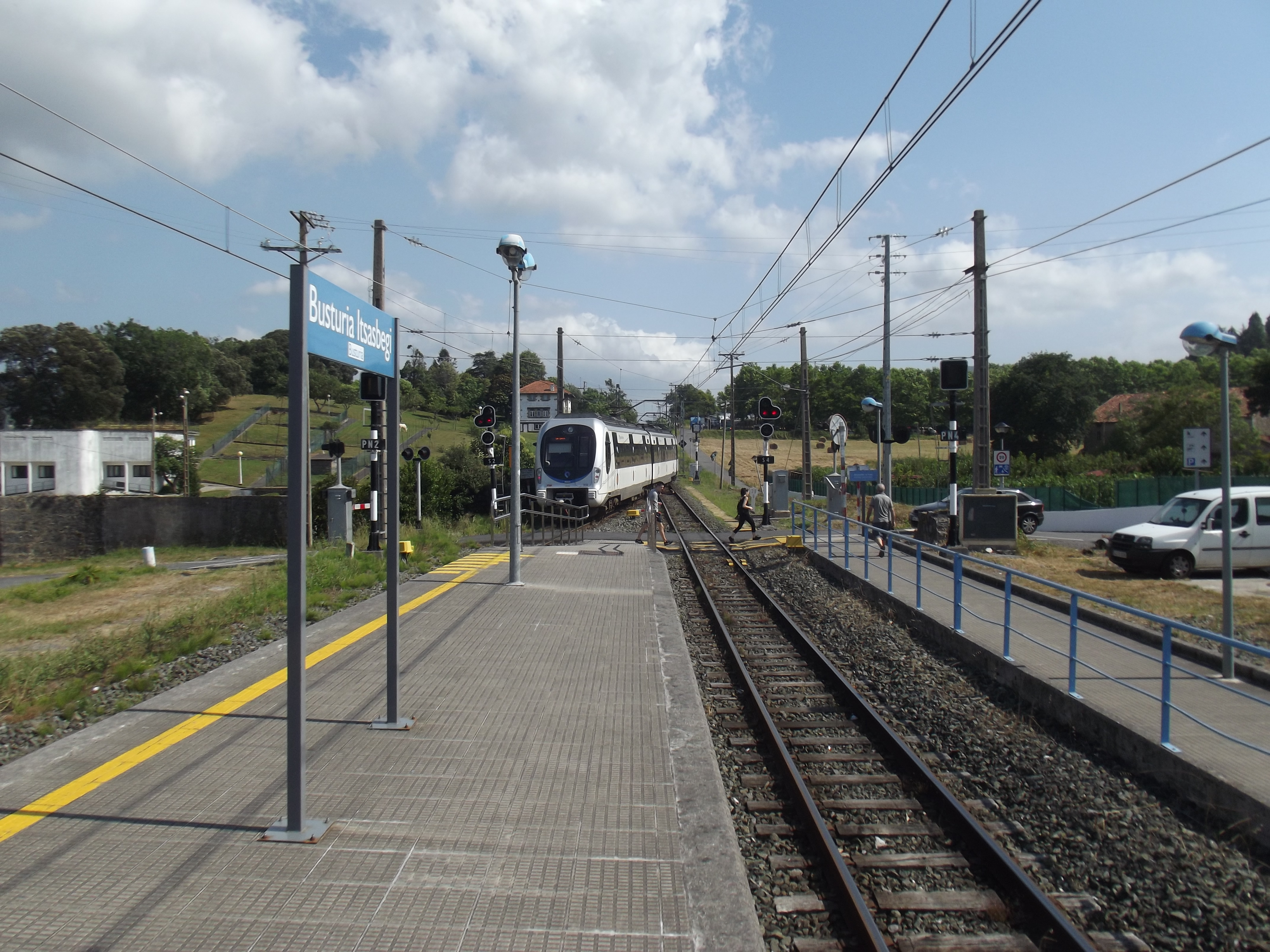
- A 900 series train leaving the station

General information
- Location: Busturia, Biscay; Spain
- Coordinates: 43°23′28″N 2°41′38″W
- Owner: Euskal Trenbide Sarea
- Operator: Euskotren
- Line: Line E4
- Platforms: 1 side platform, 1 island platform
- Tracks: 2

Construction
- Structure type: At-grade
- Parking: No
- Accessible: Partial

Other information
- Fare zone: Zone 4

History
- Opened: 15 March 1893

Services
Preceding station	Euskotren Trena	Following station
Axpe towards Matiko	Line E4	Mundaka towards Bermeo
Location

Itsasbegi is a railway station in Busturia, Basque Country, Spain. It is owned by Euskal Trenbide Sarea and operated by Euskotren. It lies on the Urdaibai line.

== History ==
The station opened as the northern terminus of the Gernika-Pedernales extension of the Amorebieta-Gernika line, on 15 March 1893. Between 1948 and 1949, due to the extension of the line towards Bermeo, the station was completely renovated.

== Name ==
The station is in the municipality of Busturia, but primarily serves the neighboring village of Sukarrieta (Spanish: Pedernales). As a result, the name of the station has changed at least five times throughout its history:

- Pedernales (1893 to 1903)
- Pedernales, jurisdicción Busturia (1903 to 1941)
- Pedernales (1941 to 1961)
- Pedernales-Busturia (1961 to 1980)
- Sukarrieta (1980 to 1997)
- Busturia-Itsasbegi or simply Itsasbegi (from 1997)

== Services ==
The station is served by Euskotren Trena line E4. It runs every 30 minutes (in each direction) during weekdays, and every hour during weekends.
