= Mundaka station =

Railway station in Mundaka, Basque Country, Spain

Mundaka
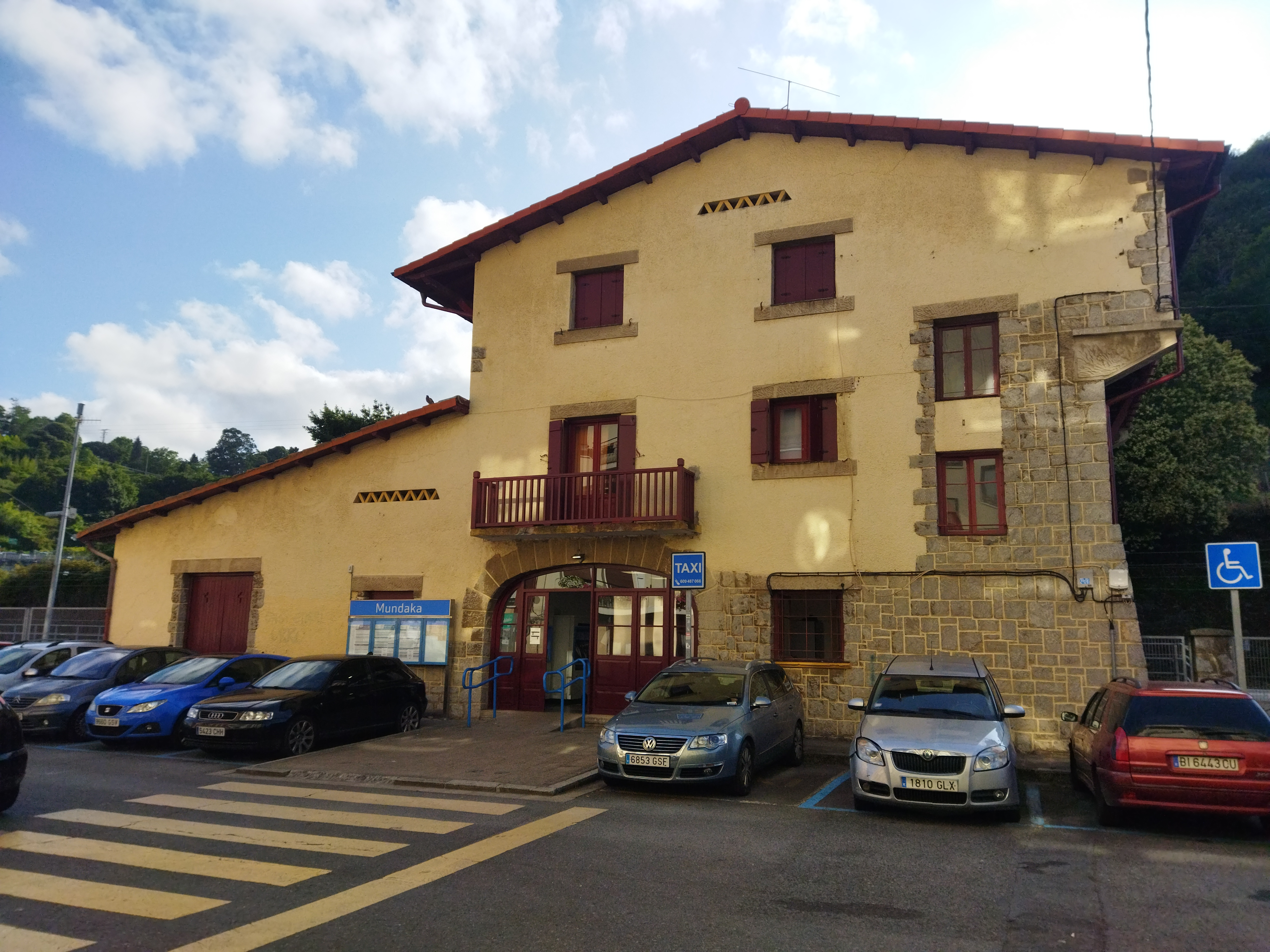
- View of the station

General information
- Location: Mundaka, Biscay; Spain
- Coordinates: 43°24′32″N 2°42′04″W
- Owner: Euskal Trenbide Sarea
- Operator: Euskotren
- Line: Line E4
- Platforms: 1 side platform
- Tracks: 2

Construction
- Structure type: At-grade
- Parking: Yes
- Accessible: Yes

Other information
- Fare zone: Zone 4

History
- Opened: 16 August 1955

Services
Preceding station	Euskotren Trena	Following station
Itsasbegi towards Matiko	Line E4	Bermeo Terminus
Location

Mundaka is a railway station in Mundaka, Basque Country, Spain. It is owned by Euskal Trenbide Sarea and operated by Euskotren. It lies on the Urdaibai line.

== History ==
The station opened, together with the rest of the Pedernales-Bermeo extension of the Amorebieta-Pedernales line, on 16 August 1955. The sidings for freight traffic were removed in the 1970s.

== Services ==
The station is served by Euskotren Trena line E4. It runs every 30 minutes (in each direction) during weekdays, and every hour during weekends.
