= Nebrija University =

Private university in Madrid, Spain

Coordinates: 40.42926°N 3.71297°W

- Universidad Nebrija
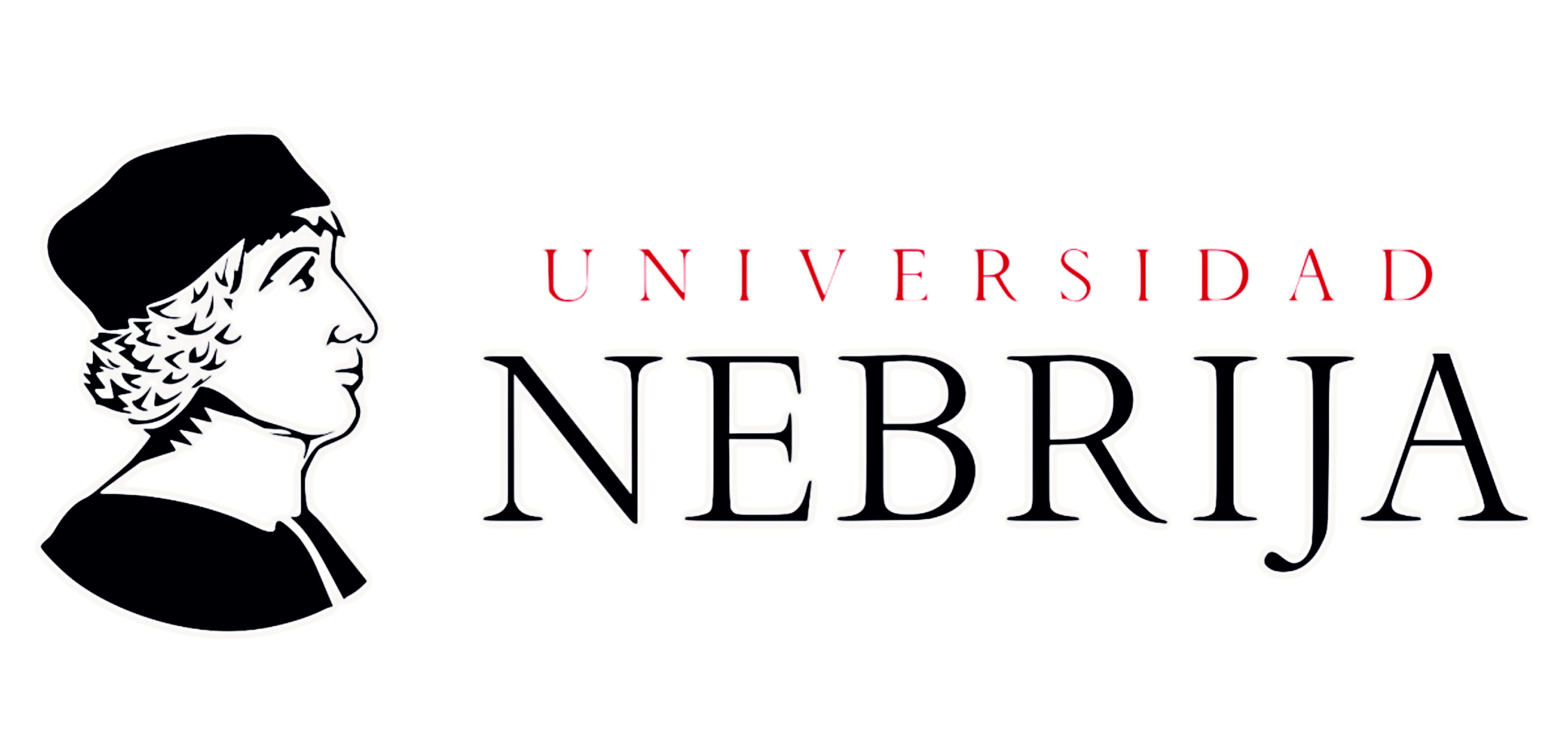
- Type: Private
- Established: 1995
- President: Manuel Villa Cellino
- Rector: José Muñiz Fernández
- Students: 12,000
- Location: Madrid, Spain
- Campus: urban
- Website: www.nebrija.com

Nebrija University is a private university based in Madrid, Spain, named after Antonio de Nebrija. It has operated since 1995, and is headquartered in the Nebija-Princesa building in Madrid.

== Organization ==
The university has 7 schools, and online programs. The university offers degree programs in education sciences, law, political science, economics, engineering, psychology. There is a library, both in traditional and electronic format (students can access the virtual library at any time).

== Presidents and rectors ==
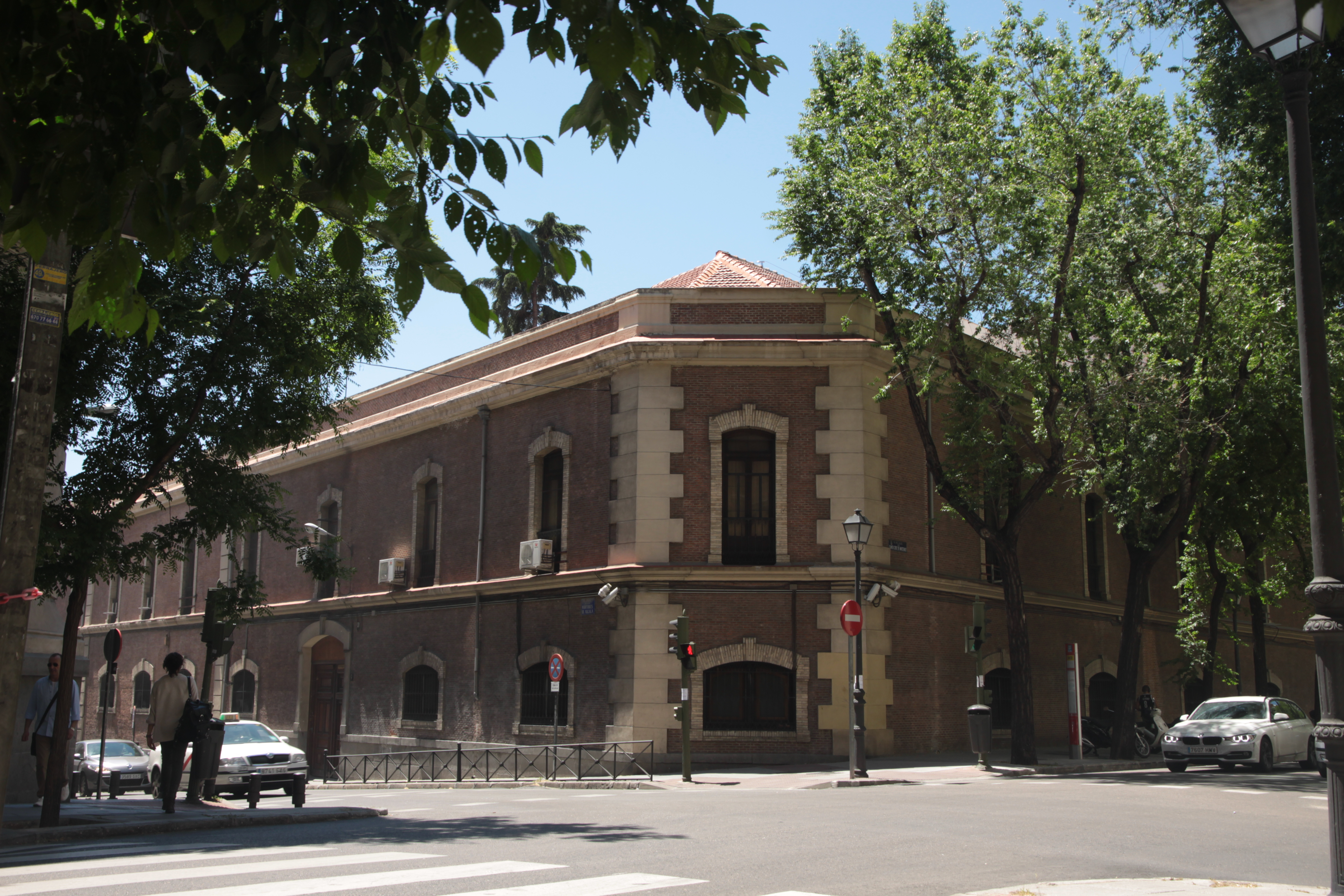

=== Presidents ===
- Manuel Villa Cellino

=== Rectors ===
The Rector is the highest academic authority.

- José Muñiz Fernández

== Notable alumni ==
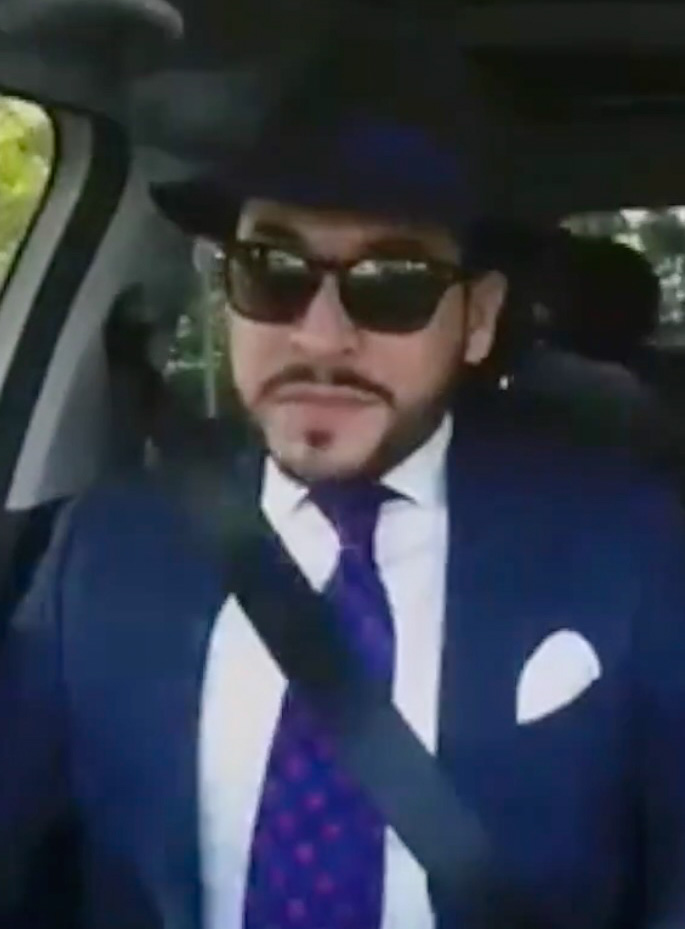
Abelardo de la Espriella

- Mónica Domínguez Blanco, Spanish journalist
- Eriz Cerezo, Spanish television communicator and journalist
- Abelardo de la Espriella, Colombian lawyer, businessman, and politician
- Sergio Mena, Spanish journalist and university professor
- María Fernanda Rojas, Colombian political scientist, communicator, professor, lawyer and politician
