= Eriz Cerezo =

Spanish communicator and journalist

- Born: Eriz Cerezo Ferrón; 31 July 1997 (age 29); Bilbao, Spain
- Citizenship: Spain
- Education: (BA); University of the Basque Country (BA); Nebrija University (MA)
- Occupations: producer, communicator, journalist
- Years active: 2015–present
- Employer(s): Antena 3 Telemadrid; La Sexta; EITB
- Television: Antena 3 Noticias; Madrid Directo; Mundo Brasero; La Roca; Vascos por el mundo

Eriz Cerezo Ferrón (born 31 July 1997 in Bilbao) is a Spanish television communicator and journalist.

== Life and career ==
Eriz Cerezo was born Bilbao on 31 July 1997. He graduated in audiovisual communication at the University of the Basque Country (UPV/EHU) (2015–2019). Subsequently, he completed a master's degree (MA) in television journalism at Nebrija University (2019–2020).

As a communicator and journalist, he worked as a reporter on the "La Kapital" program on TeleBilbao. He traveled to Madrid and from 2020 to 2023 he became a reporter for Antena 3 Noticias in its weekend edition on Antena 3. In the same tv channel, he was part of the Antena Abierta team and in 2022, together with Roberto Brasero, he was part of the Mundo Brasero team. That same summer he began working on the program Madrid Directo on Telemadrid and months later he became a reporter for the program presented by Nuria Roca on Sunday afternoons on La Sexta, called "La Roca". He is now one of the hosts of the famous TV show on the Basque Country's regional television, ETB2, "Vascos por el mundo".

In the year 2021, he published his first book of poems, Tan sólo setenta y nueve días (Postdata Editions).

== Filmography ==
=== Television ===
- 2025–2026, Espejo Público, Antena 3, Antena 3 Noticias
- 2023–2025, Vascos por el mundo, ETB 2, La CometaTV
- 2022–2023, La Roca, LaSexta, Cuarzo Producciones
- 2020–2023, Antena 3 Noticias, Antena 3
- 2022, Madrid Directo, Telemadrid, Cuarzo Producciones
- 2022, Mundo Brasero, Antena 3
- 2022, Antena Abierta, Antena 3
- 2018-2019, La Kapital, TeleBilbao

=== Film ===
- 2015, Psiconautas, dir. Pedro Rivero y Alberto Vázquez (Goya Award)
- 2016, La tercera ley de Newton, dir. Jorge Barrios

== Works ==
- 2021, Tan sólo setenta y nueve días, Postdata Editions.
