= Retana =

Hamlet in Álava, Spain

- Concejo
- Location within Álava Location within the Basque Country Location within Spain
- Coordinates: 42°54′N 2°39′W
- Country: Spain
- Autonomous community: Basque Country
- Province: Álava
- Comarca: Vitoria-Gasteiz
- Municipality: Vitoria-Gasteiz

Area
  - Total: 3.24 km^{2} (1.25 sq mi)
- Elevation: 527 m (1,729 ft)

Population (2021)
  - Total: 47
  - Density: 15/km^{2} (38/sq mi)
- Postal code: 01510

Retana (Spanish pronunciation: [reˈtana], Basque: Erretana [eretana]) is a hamlet and concejo located in the municipality of Vitoria-Gasteiz, in Álava province, Basque Country, Spain.
