= Galdakao =

Galdakao Galdácano (Spanish)
- Municipality
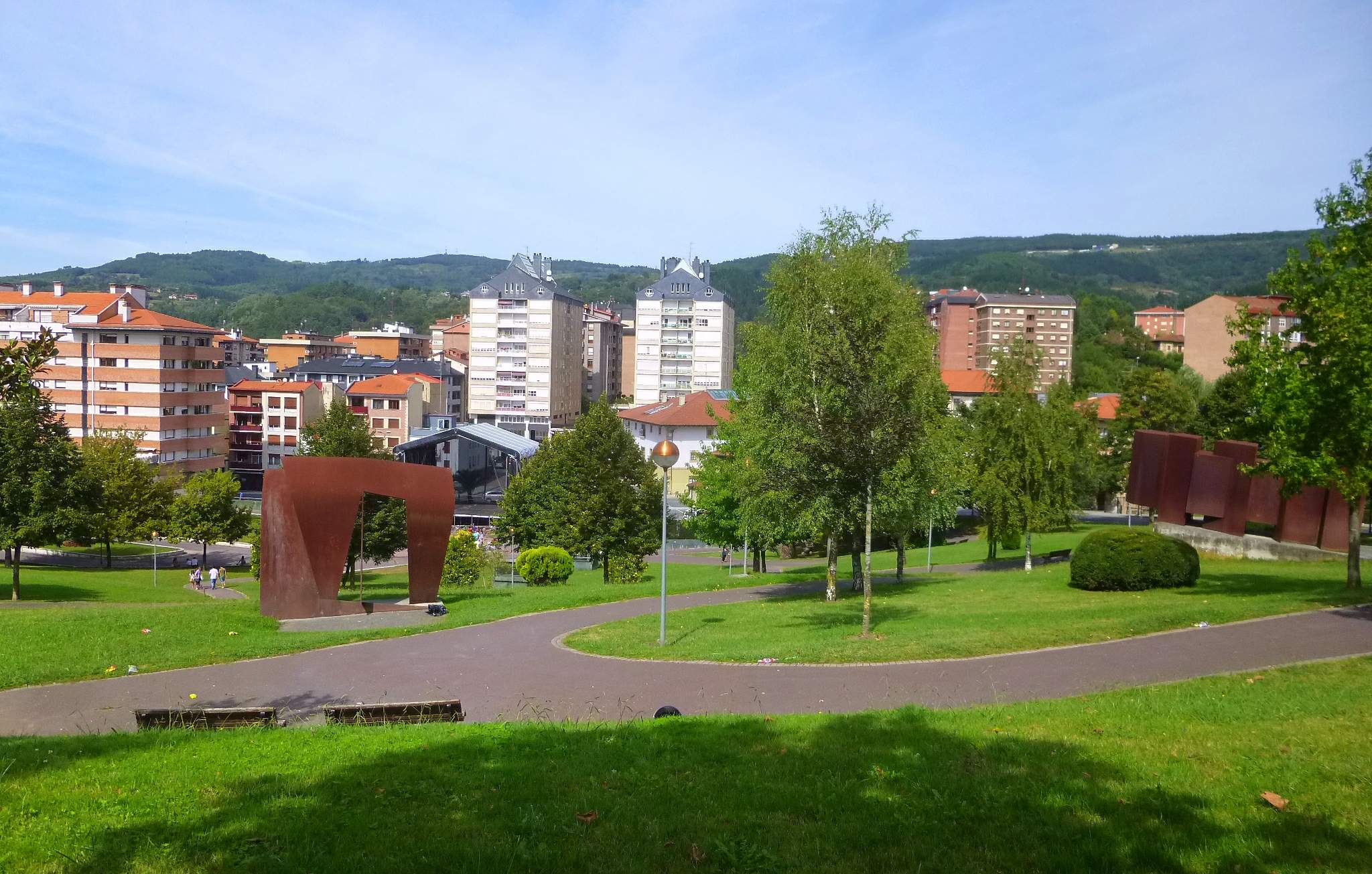
- View of Galdakao from Ardanza Park

- Flag Coat of arms

- Location of Galdakao within the Basque Country
- Coordinates: 43°13′50″N 2°50′45″W
- Country: Spain
- Autonomous community: Basque Country
- Province: Biscay
- Comarca: Greater Bilbao

Government
  - Mayor: Iñigo Arriandiaga Hernando (Basque Country Unite)

Area
  - Total: 24.16 km^{2} (9.33 sq mi)
- Elevation: 60 m (200 ft)
- Highest elevation: 326 m (1,070 ft)
- Lowest elevation: 48 m (157 ft)

Population (2025)
  - Total: 24,767
  - Density: 1,025/km^{2} (2,655/sq mi)
- Demonym(s): Galdakar, Galdakoztar, G-town
- Time zone: UTC+1 (CET)
  - Summer (DST): UTC+2 (CEST)
- Postal code: 48960
- Website: Official website

Galdakao (Spanish: Galdácano) is a town and municipality in the province of Biscay in the Basque Autonomous Community in Spain. It has 24,767 inhabitants.

It is located in the Greater Bilbao, in the valley of the Ibaizabal river, near the Ganguren mountain range. It is surrounded by some summits such as Arrezurriaga (329 m), Txispamendi (221 m) and Santa María (476 m) in the north and Upo (556 m) and Mandoia (640 m) in the south.

Galdakao borders the municipalities of Zamudio, Lezama and Larrabetzu to the north, Zaratamo and Zeberio to the south, Amorebieta, Lemona and Bedia to the east and Etxebarri and Basauri to the west.

== Neighbourhoods ==
- Aperribai
- Arteta
- Bekea
- Bengoetxe (Bengoeche)
- Berezikoetxe
- Elexalde (Elejalde)
- Erletxe
- Olabarrieta-Txistulanda
- Urreta
- Usansolo
- Tximelarre Bekoa
- Tximelarre Goikoa
- Muguru
- Zabalea

== Demographics ==
As of 2025, the population is 24,767, of which 48.8% are male, and 51.2% are female. Minors make up 13.9% of the population, and seniors make up 26.9%.

Historical population

| Year | Pop. | ±% |
|---|---|---|
| 1842 | 905 | — |
| 1857 | 1,254 | +38.6% |
| 1877 | 1,593 | +27.0% |
| 1887 | 1,940 | +21.8% |
| 1900 | 2,750 | +41.8% |
| 1910 | 4,025 | +46.4% |
| 1920 | 5,019 | +24.7% |
| 1930 | 6,482 | +29.1% |
| 1940 | 7,250 | +11.8% |

| Year | Pop. | ±% |
|---|---|---|
| 1950 | 7,750 | +6.9% |
| 1960 | 10,556 | +36.2% |
| 1970 | 18,854 | +78.6% |
| 1981 | 26,785 | +42.1% |
| 1991 | 28,569 | +6.7% |
| 2001 | 29,544 | +3.4% |
| 2011 | 29,153 | −1.3% |
| 2021 | 29,369 | +0.7% |

Before the separation of Usansolo in 2023
Source: INE

=== Immigration ===
As of 2025, immigrants make up 8.2% of the population. The 5 largest foreign countries of birth are Colombia, Morocco, Venezuela, Romania, and Paraguay.
