= Usansolo =

Usansolo Usánsolo
- Municipality
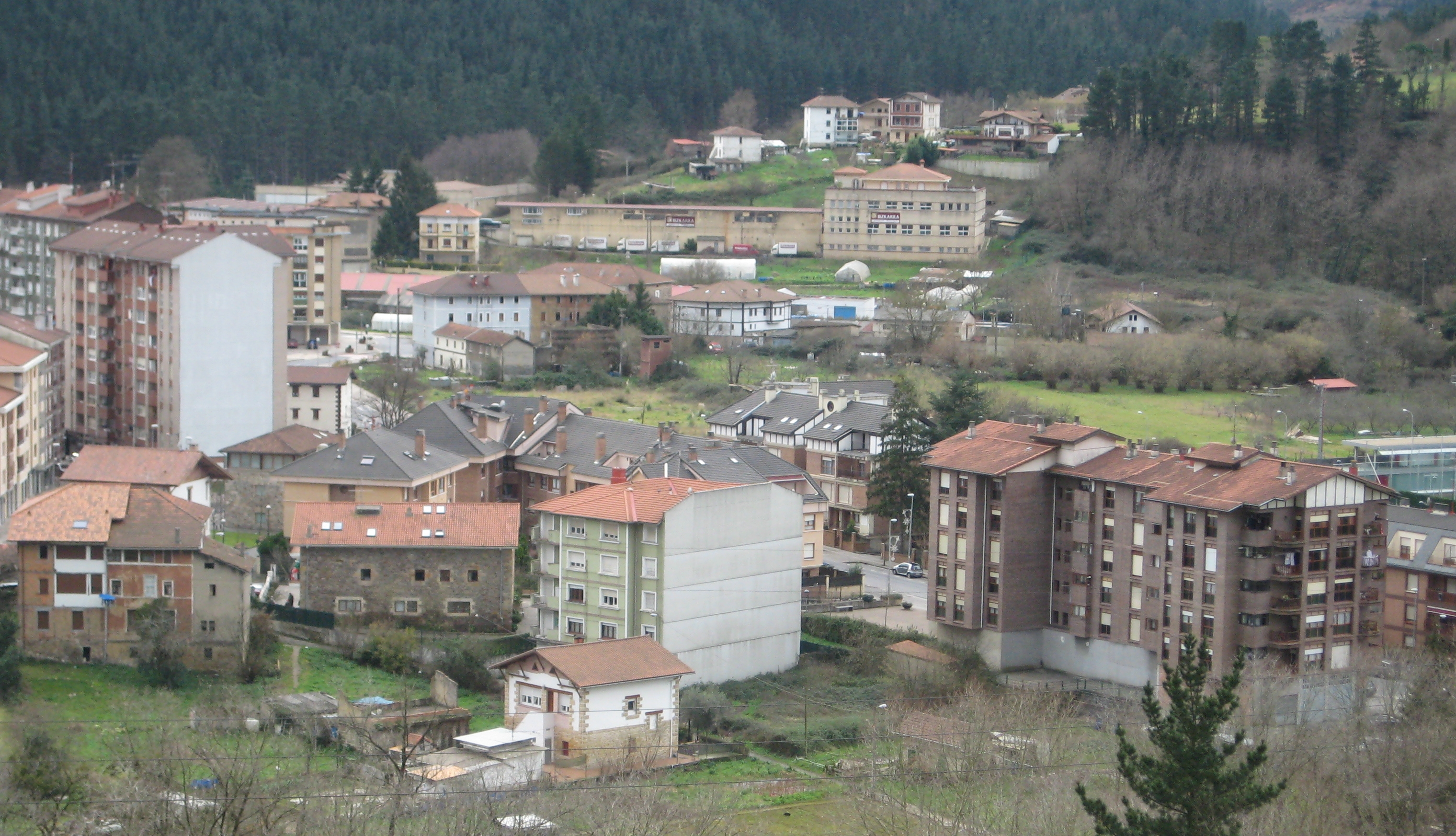
- View of Usansolo from the hospital.

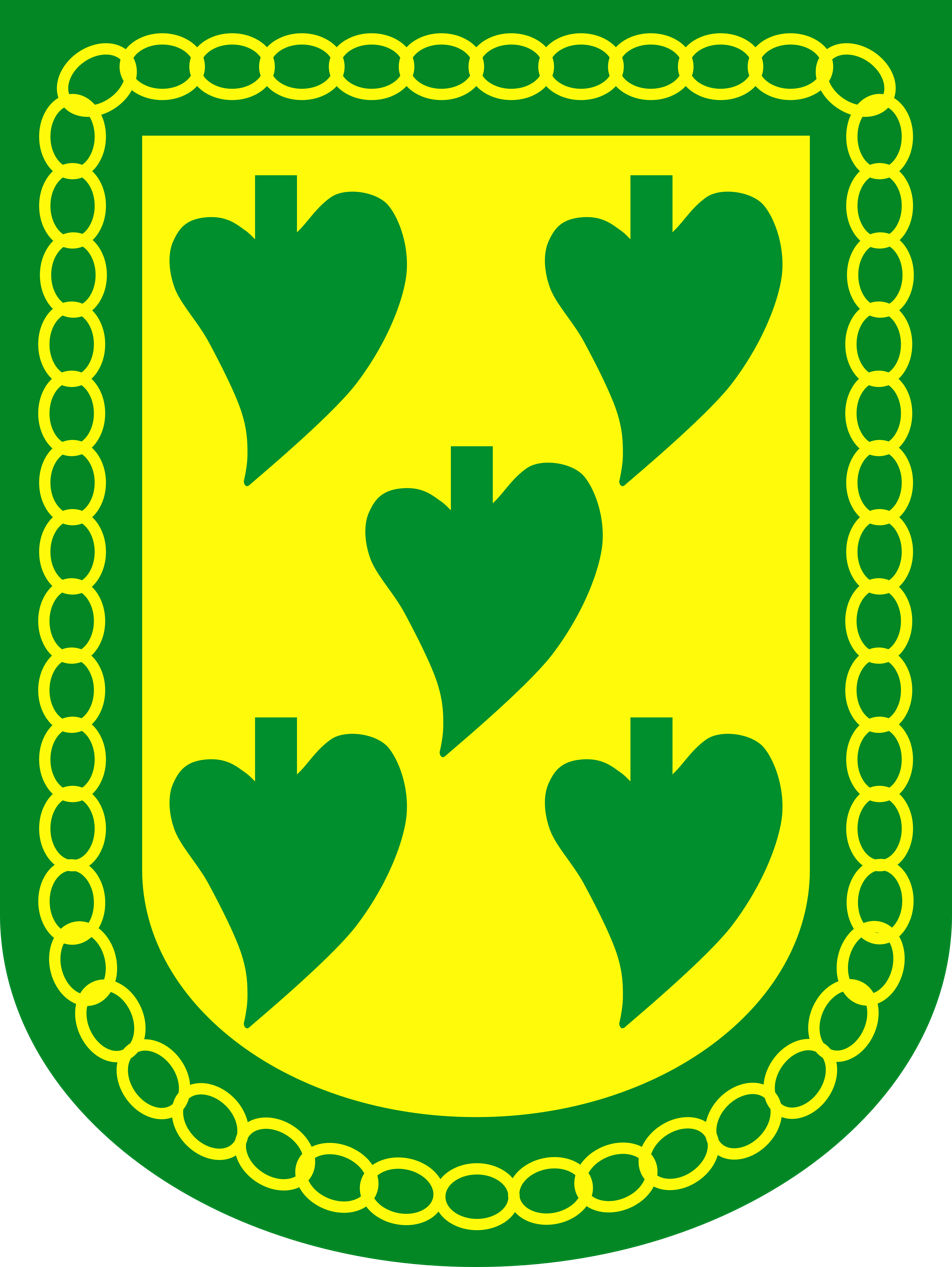
- Coat of arms

- Location of Usansolo within the Basque Country
- Coordinates: 43°13′19″N 2°49′07″W
- Country: Spain
- Autonomous community: Basque Country
- Province: Biscay
- Comarca: Greater Bilbao

Government
  - Mayor: Agustín Aizpuru Izaguirre (Basque Country Unite)

Area
  - Total: 31.66 km^{2} (12.22 sq mi)
- Elevation: 51 m (167 ft)

Population (2025-01-01)
  - Total: 4,565
  - Density: 144.2/km^{2} (373.4/sq mi)
- Demonym: Usansolotar,
- Time zone: UTC+1 (CET)
  - Summer (DST): UTC+2 (CEST)
- Postal code: 48960
- Website: Official website

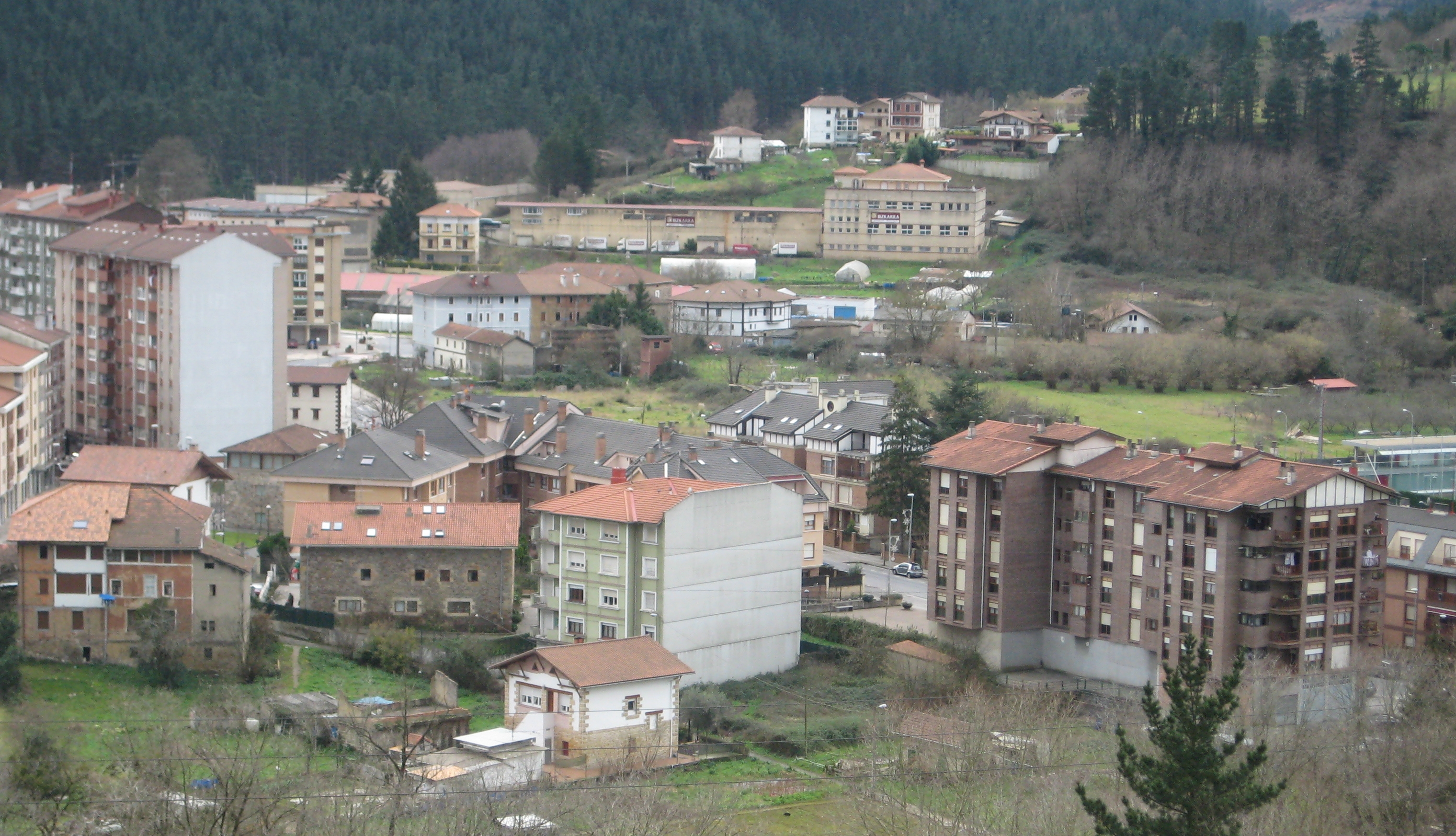
View of Usansolo from the hospital.

Usansolo is a municipality located to the east of Galdakao (Biscay) in Spain, 2 km from the centre of the neighbouring town. With few baserris, its population began rising after the railway station was built in the 19th century, when flats started being built. It has 4570 inhabitants as of 2023. Due to its distance from the center of Galdakao, proposals to make it an independent town gathered momentum, until its independence was confirmed on 28 December 2023. Usansolo is home to a Bridgestone tire cord plant.

== Notable people ==
- Idoia Zenarrutzabeitia Beldarrain
