= Amorebieta station =

Railway station in Amorebieta-Etxano, Basque Country, Spain

Amorebieta
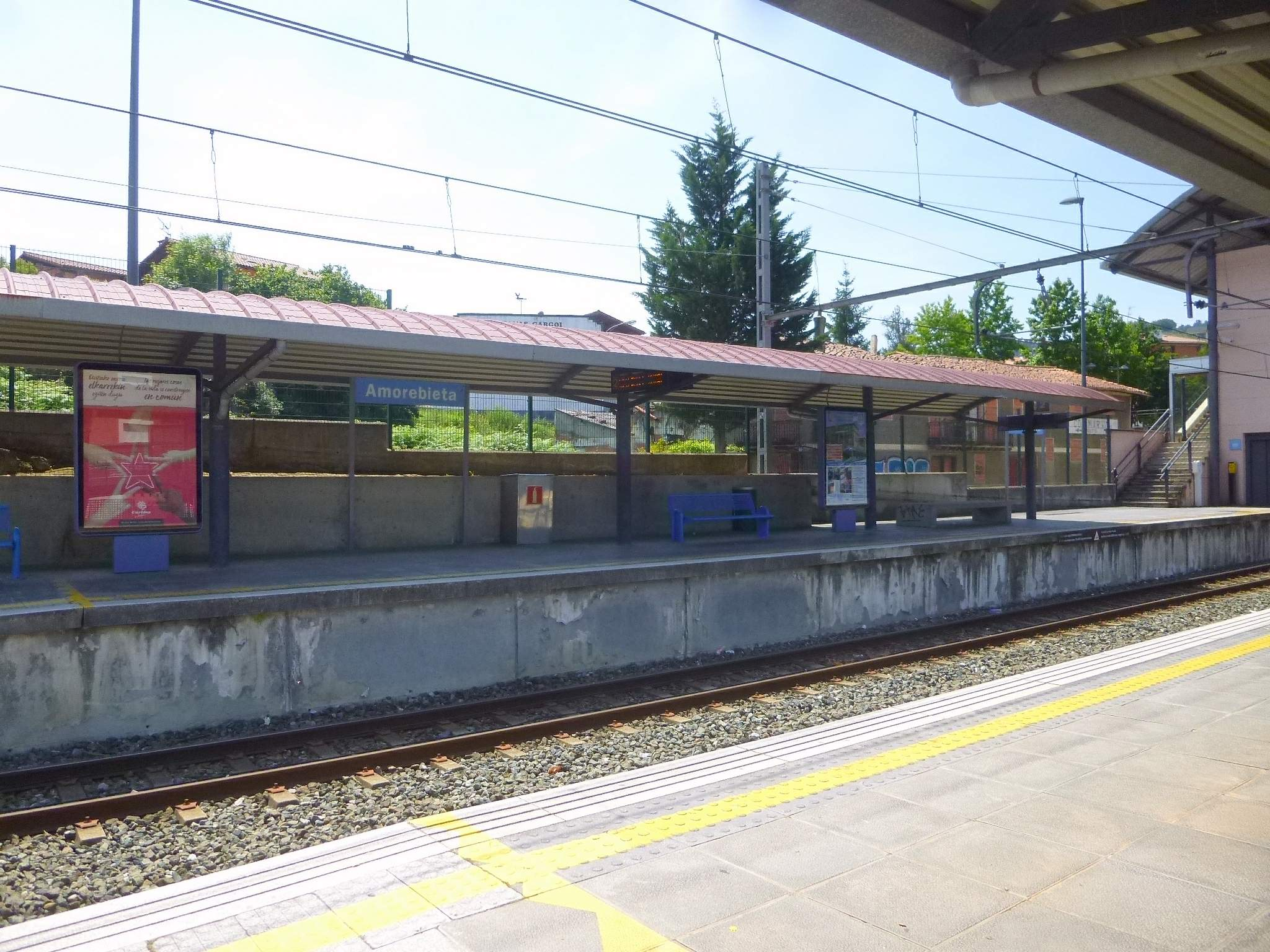
- View of the platforms

General information
- Location: Amorebieta-Etxano, Biscay; Spain
- Coordinates: 43°13′N 2°44′W
- Owner: Euskal Trenbide Sarea
- Operator: Euskotren
- Line: Line E1
- Platforms: 1 island platform, 1 side platform
- Tracks: 3

Construction
- Structure type: At-grade
- Parking: No
- Accessible: Yes

Other information
- Fare zone: Zone 3

History
- Opened: 1 July 1882
- Rebuilt: 5 October 1995

Services
Preceding station	Euskotren Trena	Following station
Lemoa towards Matiko	Line E1	Euba towards Pasaia
Location

Amorebieta is a railway station in Amorebieta-Etxano, Basque Country, Spain. It is owned by Euskal Trenbide Sarea and operated by Euskotren. It lies on the Bilbao–San Sebastián line.

== History ==
The station opened as part of the Bilbao-Durango line in 1882. In 1888 the Amorebieta-Guernica railway opened. The terminus of the new line had three tracks converging at a turntable as well as a track connecting it to the Bilbao-Durango line. The new terminus didn't have a dedicated passenger building, and travellers used the existing building built for the Bilbao-Durango line. In 1973 a chord was built allowing trains from Bermeo to run directly to Bilbao without having to reverse at Amorebieta, some trains from the Urdaibai line served Amorebieta until 1989. The whole station was rebuilt in 1995, together with the double-tracking of the Bilbao–San Sebastián line from Lemoa.

== Services ==
The station is served by Euskotren Trena line E1. It runs every 30 minutes (in each direction) during weekdays, and every hour during weekends.
