= Amorebieta-Etxano =

- Municipality
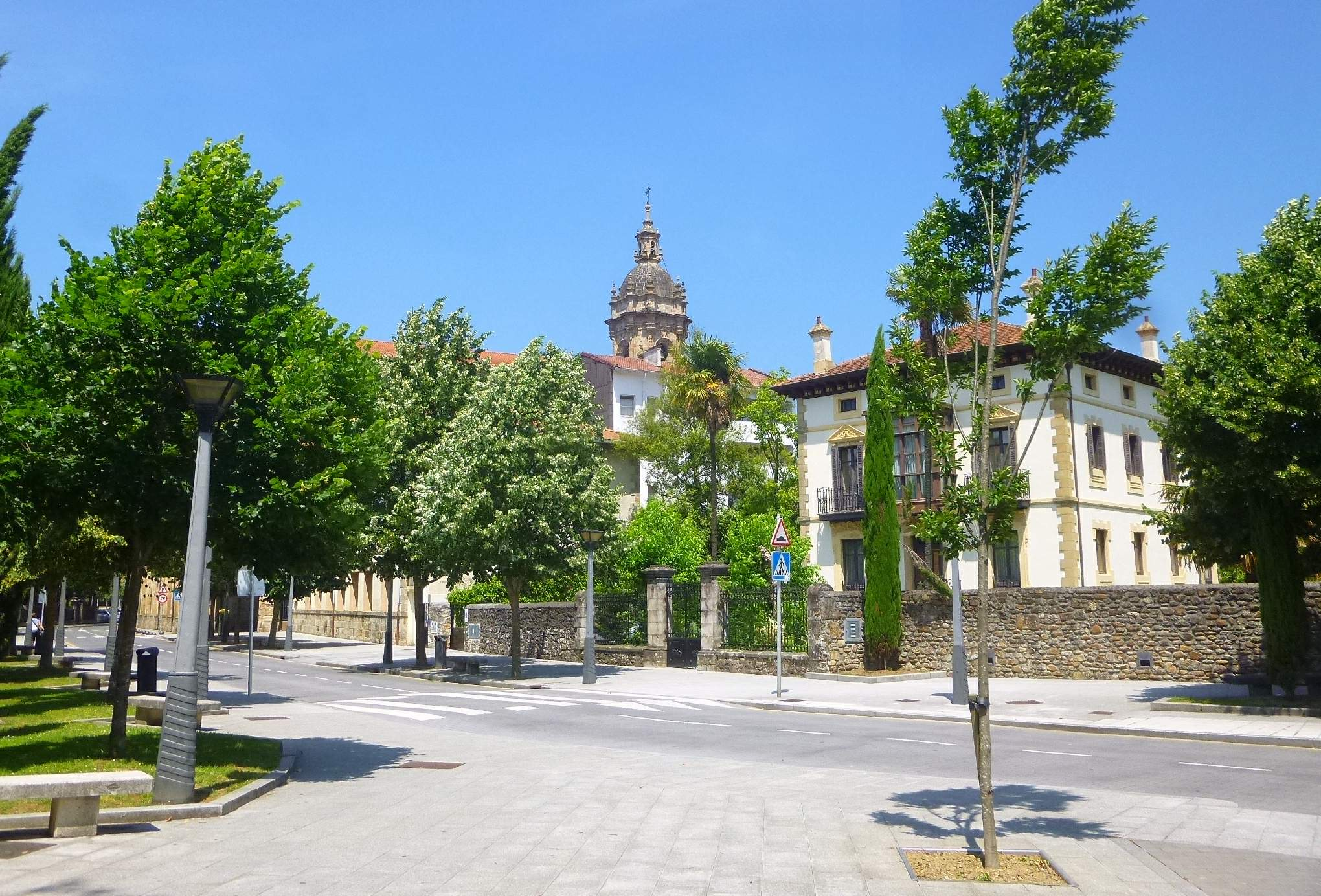

- Flag Coat of arms

- Location of Amorebieta-Etxano within the Basque Country Amorebieta-Etxano (Spain)
- Coordinates: 43°13′9″N 2°44′3″W
- Country: Spain
- Autonomous community: Basque Country
- Province: Biscay
- Comarca: Durangaldea
- Founded: January 26, 1951

Government
  - Mayor: Andoni Agirrebeitia (PNV)

Area
  - Total: 58.46 km^{2} (22.57 sq mi)
- Elevation: 65 m (213 ft)

Population (2025-01-01)
  - Total: 19,660
  - Density: 336.3/km^{2} (871.0/sq mi)
- Demonym: Zornotzarra
- Time zone: UTC+1 (CET)
  - Summer (DST): UTC+2 (CEST)
- Postal code: 48340
- Website: Official website

Amorebieta-Etxano, also known as Zornotza (Spanish: Amorebieta-Echano), is a town and municipality located in Biscay in the Basque Country, an Autonomous Community in northern Spain.

At the time of the 2019 census, the population of the municipality was 19,339, with 16,907 inhabitants living in Amorebieta. The mayor is Andoni Agirrebeitia.

The coat of arms, which features the two parishes, bears the inscription Amorebieta Etxanoko Udala Zornotza, which means Amorebieta-Echano Town Council, Zornoza.

== Geography ==
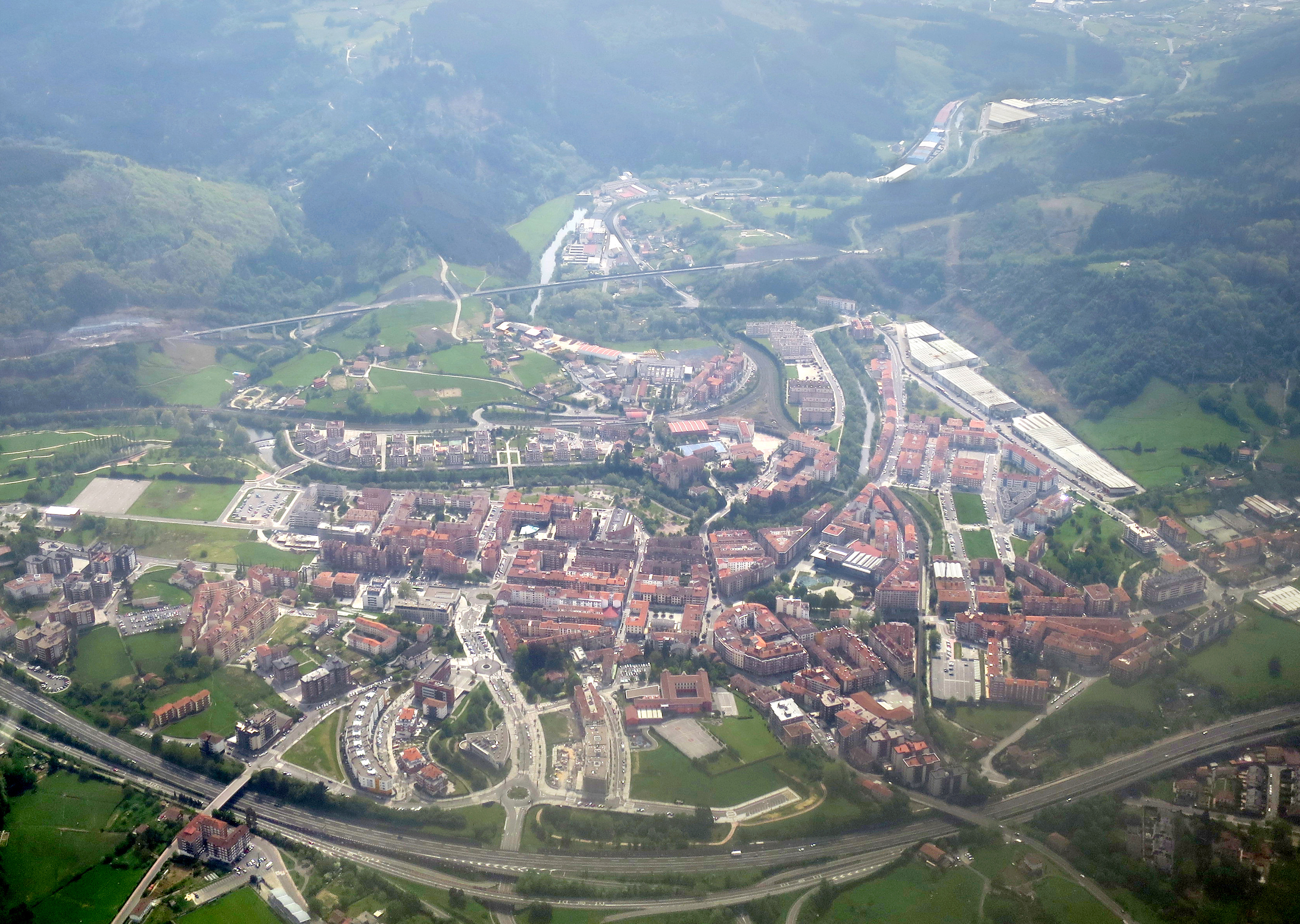
Aerial view

Amorebieta-Etxano is an inland town in the comarca of Duranguesado in the province of Biscay in northern Spain. It is about 25 km (16 mi) east of Bilbao and close to the European route E70 which runs along the north coast of Spain. It is located in the valley of the River Ibaizabal; this river joins the River Nervión a few kilometres to the north, after which it is sometimes called the "Nervión-Ibaizabal" because the two rivers are very similar in size. Amorebieta-Etxano is situated among rugged mountains and has a rich historical heritage.

The municipality's terrain is characterised by the Ibaizabal river valley and the mountains that surround it. Both the north and south feature a rugged landscape. To the north, the foothills of the Sinclinorio de Vizcaya mountain range culminate in Mount Bizkargi, at the northernmost point of the territory (563 metres). To the south, the ground rises more sharply to over 700 metres in the foothills of the mountain range that extends southwards from Anboto, included in the Urkiola Natural Park. The altitude ranges from 770 metres in the south to 60 metres on the banks of the Ibaizabal River.

== History ==
The municipality of Amorebieta-Etxano came into being on 26 January 1951 as the result of a merger between Amorebieta and Etxano, two communities in the historic administrative district of Merindad de Zornotza. The other parts of the district were merged into the neighbouring municipality of Muxika. The new coat of arms shows the union between Amorebieta and Etxano. In the 2014 census, Amorebieta had a population of 16,907 while that of Etxano was 221.

== The town ==
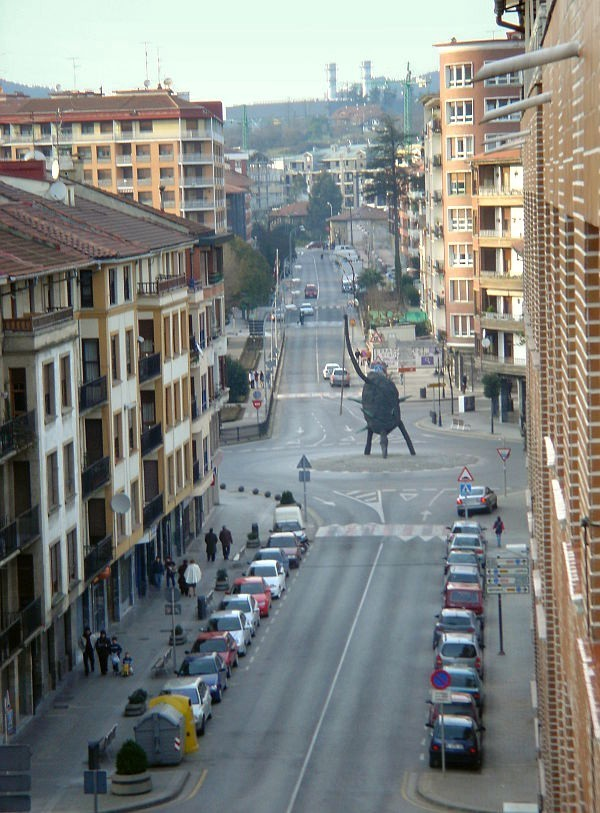

The town is divided into several districts. The church of Santa María de la Asunción is in the centre of Amorebieta on the banks of the Ibaizaba. It is a large Renaissance building started in 1555 and opened for worship in 1608 and is noted for its altarpiece. Another Renaissance church is the Parroquia de San Juan Bautista de Larrea. This dates back to 1647, and in 1704 it was given to the Carmelite Order to found a convent. In San Antonio is the hermitage of San Miguel de Dudea, and nearby is the Neoclassical López Palace.

A branch of the international company Tecnalia Research & Innovation is located here in the Parque Empresarial Boroa where the firm employs 1,500 people.

== Notable people ==
- Jon Aurtenetxe, footballer
- Carmelo Cedrún, footballer
- Xabier Etxeita, footballer
- Beñat Intxausti, cyclist
- José Ignacio López de Arriortúa, businessman
- Jon Morcillo, footballer
