= Muxika =

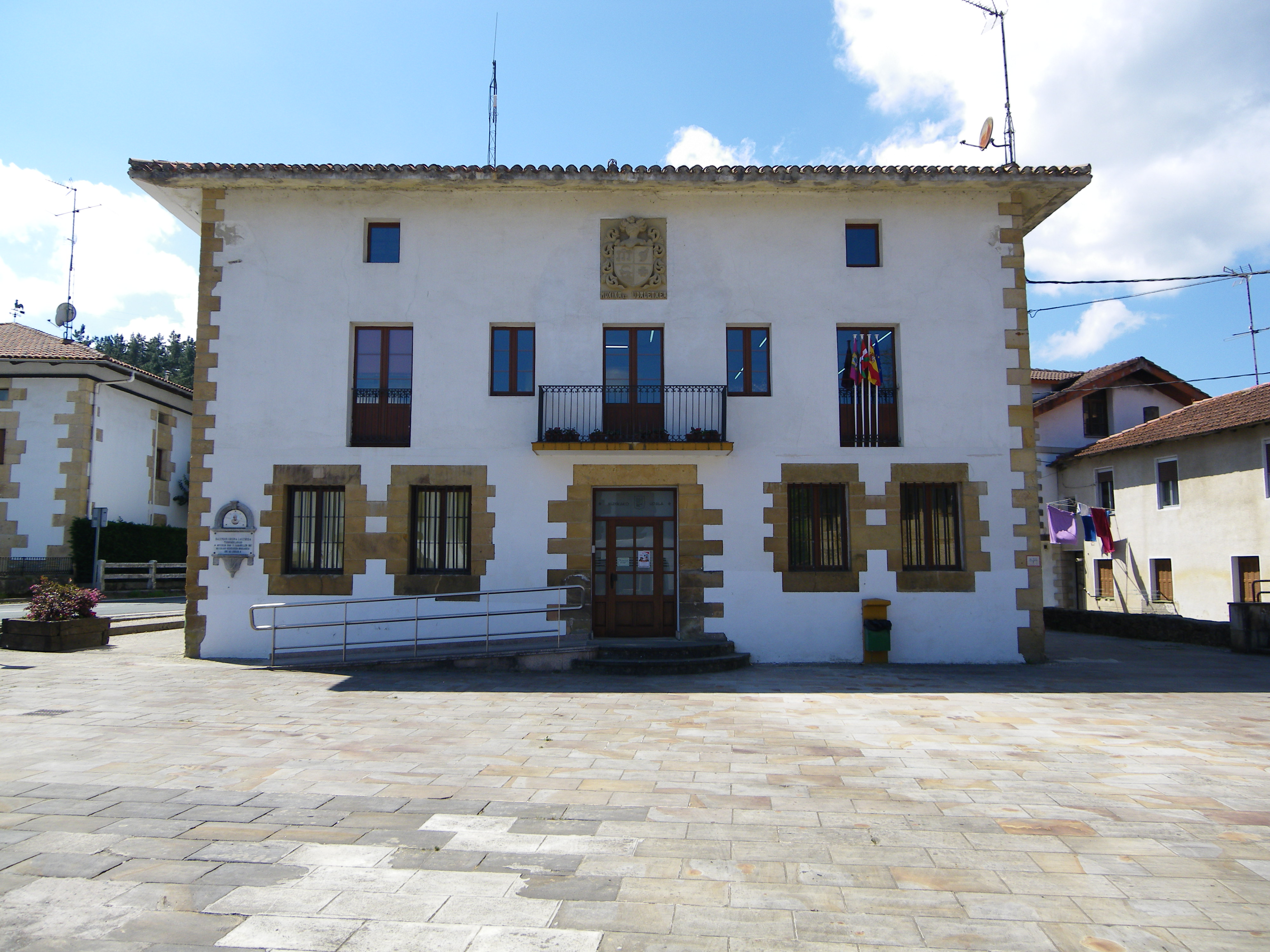
- Town hall of Muxika

- Coat of arms

- Location of Muxika within the Basque Country Location of Muxika within Spain
- Coordinates: 43°17′20″N 2°41′29″W
- Country: Spain
- Autonomous community: Basque Country
- Province: Biscay
- Comarca: Busturialdea

Government
  - Mayor: Aitor Goldaraz Goienetxea

Area
  - Total: 50.02 km^{2} (19.31 sq mi)
- Elevation: 29 m (95 ft)

Population (2025-01-01)
  - Total: 1,546
  - Density: 30.91/km^{2} (80.05/sq mi)
- Time zone: UTC+1 (CET)
  - Summer (DST): UTC+2 (CEST)
- Postal code: 48392
- Website: http://www.muxikakoudala.eus

Muxika is a town and municipality located in the province of Biscay, in the autonomous community of Basque Country, northern Spain. It has a population of 1,465 inhabitants as of 2019 according to the Spanish National Statistics Institute.
