= Gernika station =

Railway station in Gernika, Basque Country, Spain

Gernika
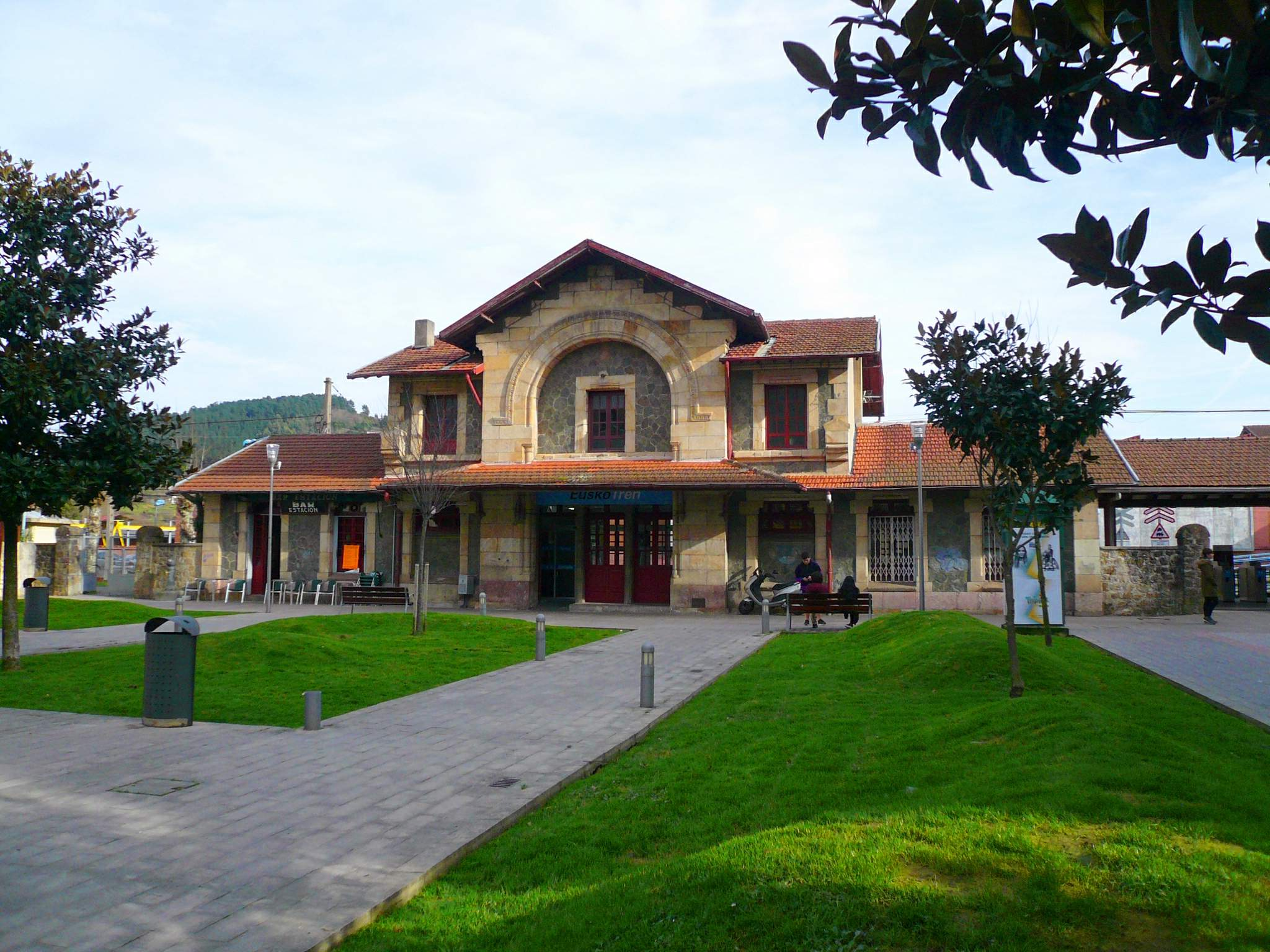
- Station building

General information
- Location: Gernika, Biscay; Spain
- Coordinates: 43°18′51″N 2°40′34″W
- Owner: Euskal Trenbide Sarea
- Operator: Euskotren
- Line: Line E4
- Platforms: 2 side platforms
- Tracks: 2

Construction
- Structure type: At-grade
- Parking: No
- Accessible: Yes

Other information
- Fare zone: Zone 4

History
- Opened: 13 August 1888

Services
| Preceding station | Euskotren Trena | Following station |
|---|---|---|
| Lurgorri towards Matiko | Line E4 | Institutoa towards Bermeo |
Location

Gernika is a railway station in Gernika, Basque Country, Spain. It is owned by Euskal Trenbide Sarea and operated by Euskotren. It lies on the Urdaibai line.

== History ==
The station opened as the northern terminus of the Amorebieta-Gernika line on 13 August 1888. The station building, designed by Pablo de Alzola and Luis de Landecho, was enlarged in 1893. The station was destroyed during the civil war when the town was bombed, and had to be rebuilt. In 1973, together with the electrification of the line, the tracks on the station and the depot were reformed. The station building was overhauled in 1990.

== Services ==
The station is served by Euskotren Trena line E4. It runs every 30 minutes (in each direction) during weekdays, and every hour during weekends.
