= Busturia =

- Municipality
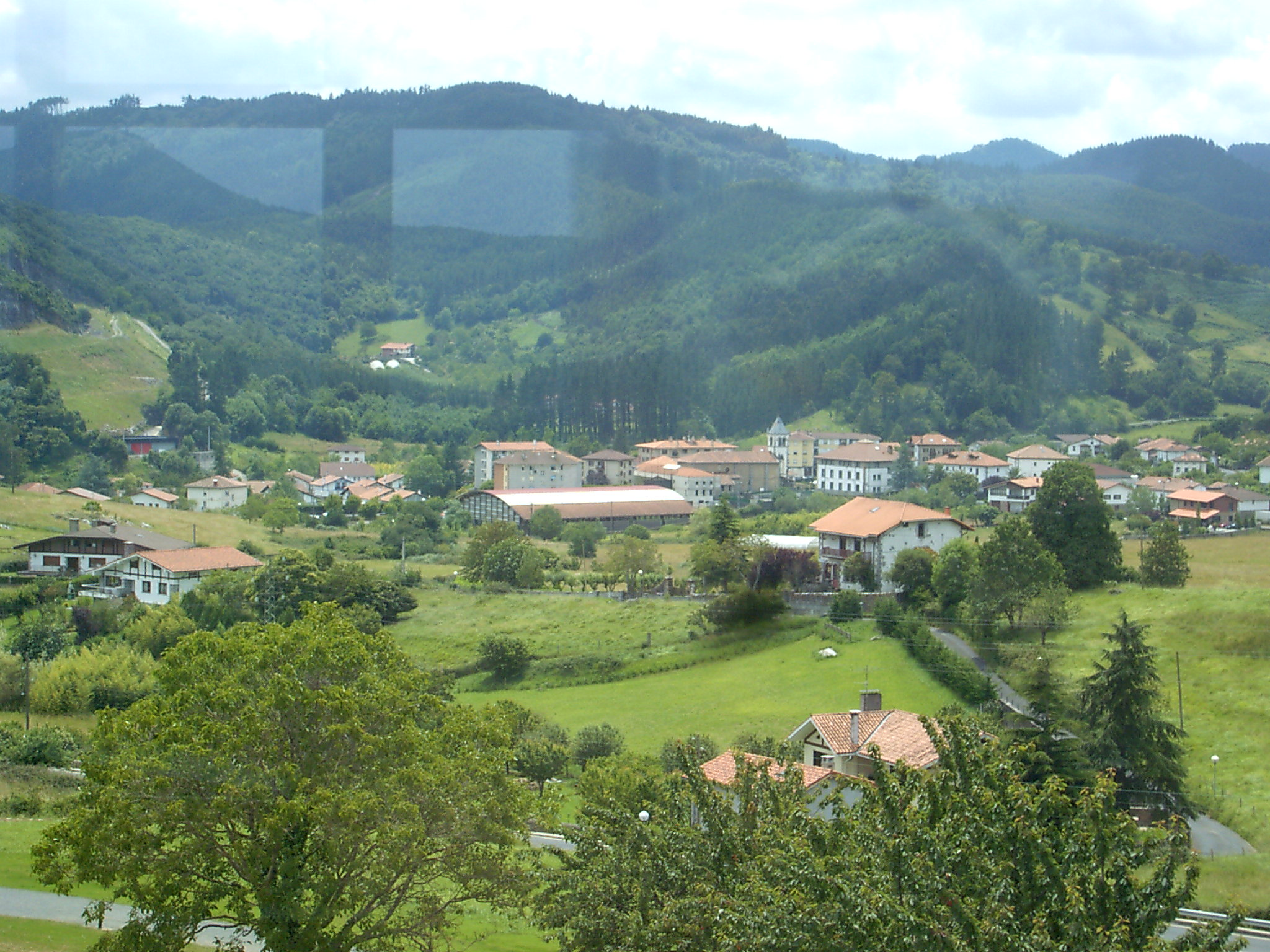

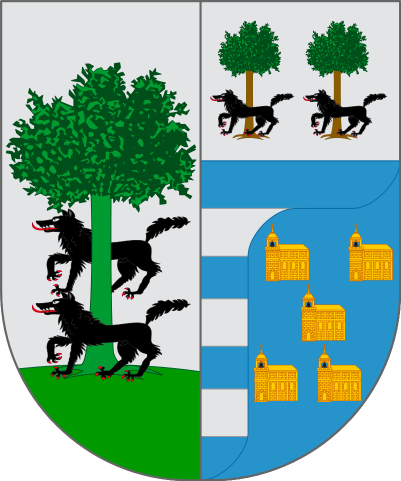
- Flag Coat of arms

- Location of Busturia within the Basque Country
- Coordinates: 43°22′58″N 2°41′48″W
- Country: Spain
- Autonomous community: Basque Country
- Province: Biscay
- Comarca: Busturialdea

Government
  - Mayor: Miren Fatima Malexetxebarria Nebreda (Bildu)

Area
  - Total: 19.63 km^{2} (7.58 sq mi)
- Elevation: 20 m (66 ft)

Population (2025-01-01)
  - Total: 1,693
  - Density: 86.25/km^{2} (223.4/sq mi)
- Demonym(s): Basque: busturiarra Spanish: busturiano
- Time zone: UTC+1 (CET)
  - Summer (DST): UTC+2 (CEST)
- Postal code: 48350
- Official language(s): Basque; Spanish
- Website: Official website

Busturia is a town and municipality located in the province of Biscay, in the autonomous community of Basque Country, northern Spain.
