= Bermeo station =

Railway station in Bermeo, Basque Country, Spain

Bermeo
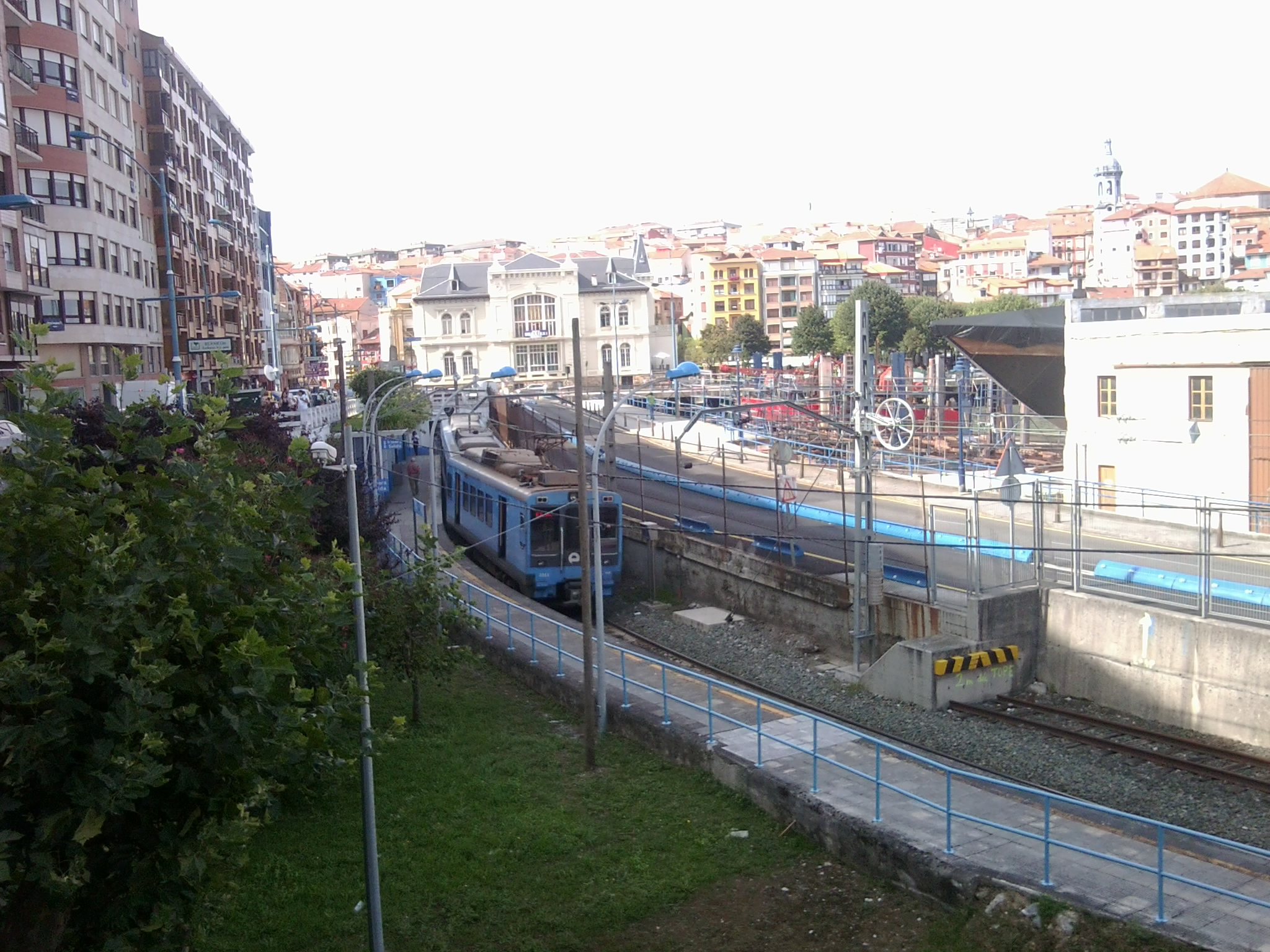
- View of the station

General information
- Location: Bermeo, Biscay; Spain
- Coordinates: 43°25′04″N 2°43′24″W
- Owner: Euskal Trenbide Sarea
- Operator: Euskotren
- Line: Line E4
- Platforms: 1 side platform
- Tracks: 1

Construction
- Structure type: At-grade
- Parking: No
- Accessible: Yes

Other information
- Fare zone: Zone 4

History
- Opened: 16 August 1955

Services
Preceding station	Euskotren Trena	Following station
Mundaka towards Matiko	Line E4	Terminus
Location

Bermeo is a railway station in Bermeo, Basque Country, Spain. It is owned by Euskal Trenbide Sarea and operated by Euskotren. It lies on the Urdaibai line.

== History ==
The station opened as the northern terminus of the Pedernales-Bermeo extension of the Amorebieta-Pedernales line on 16 August 1955. A spur track was added in 1960 to serve freight traffic from the harbor. It was removed later that decade due to lack of use. A new access to the harbor was built in 1996. It was in use until 1998, when increased passenger traffic put an end to freight trains running on the line.

== Services ==
The station is served by Euskotren Trena line E4. It runs every 30 minutes (in each direction) during weekdays, and every hour during weekends.
