= Rizzi =

Rizzi is a surname of Italian origin.

== People with the name ==
Notable people with the surname include:

- Bruno Rizzi (1901–1977), Italian political theorist; cofounder of the Communist Party of Italy
- Camillo Rizzi (1580–1618), Italian painter of the Renaissance period
- Carlo Rizzi (b, 1960), Italian conductor
- Caterina Rizzi, Italian mechanical engineer
- Darren Rizzi (born 1970), Special Teams Coordinator for the New Orleans Saints of the National Football League
- Dennis Rizzi (born 2002), known as Deddy or Dennis, Italian singer-songwriter
- Federico Rizzi (b. 1981), Italian professional football player
- Giulia Rizzi (born 1989), Italian fencer
- Giuseppe Rizzi (1886-1996), Italian professional footballer
- James Rizzi (1950-2011), American pop artist
- Jorge Ángel Livraga Rizzi (1930–1991), Argentine poet, novelist, and philosopher
- Luigi Rizzi (disambiguation), multiple people
- Luigi Rizzi (footballer) (1907-?), Italian professional football player
- Luigi Rizzi (linguist) (born 1952), Italian linguist
- Mario Rizzi (1926-2010), Roman Catholic Italian titular archbishop of Bagnoregio and apostolic nuncio to Bulgaria
- Michael Rizzitello (1927–2005), Los Angeles mobster
- Michele Rizzi (b. 1988), German professional footballer
- Nicoletta Rizzi (1940-2010), Italian television, stage and film actress
- Sarkis Rizzi (1572-1638), Catholic Lebanese Maronite bishop

== Fictional characters ==
- Carlo Rizzi (The Godfather), a fictional character in Mario Puzo's novel The Godfather
- Constanzia 'Connie' Corleone-Rizzi, a fictional character in the novel and in the 1972 film The Godfather

== See also ==
- Rizzo (surname)
