= Surge =

Surge means a sudden transient rush or flood, and may refer to:

== Science ==
- Storm surge, the onshore flow of water associated with a low-pressure weather system
- Surge (glacier), a short-lived event where a glacier can move up to velocities 100 times faster than normal
- Pyroclastic surge, the fluidised mass of turbulent gas and rock fragments ejected during some volcanic eruptions
- Characteristic impedance, also known as "surge impedance" in electrical engineering
- Voltage surge, Transient increase of voltage in electrical circuits
- Compressor stall, also known as "compressor surge", in aviation
- Surge in compressors in industrial compressors
- Hydraulic surge in liquid pipes; also called pressure surge and water hammer (see surge control)
- Surge (translational motion), one of the translational degrees of freedom of any stiff body (for example a vehicle), describing motion along the longitudinal axis (forward or backwards)
- Surge (waves), transient or periodic motion in the direction of propagation, specially of a breaking wave or surf
- Terminal lucidity, also known as "the surge" in medicine, where a patient regains significant consciousness and energy immediately preceding their death

== Popular culture ==
- Surge (soft drink), a soft drink made by the Coca-Cola Company
- Surge, a video game publishing label owned by Namco Bandai Games
- Surge (radio station), the student radio station of the University of Southampton
- Surge (Marvel Comics), a comic book character and mutant in the Marvel Universe
- Surge, a 2016 book written by Mike Michalowicz
- Surge: Side A, a 2017 multimedia performance piece by Jay Bernard
- Surge, a 2019 poetry collection by Jay Bernard
- Surge (2020 British film), a film starring Ben Whishaw
- Surge (2020 American film), a television documentary film
- Mark Surge, a hero in the Hero Factory toyline
- The Surge (video game), a video game developed by Deck13 Interactive
- Surge the Tenrec, a character from the IDW Publishing comic series Sonic the Hedgehog
- The Surge (Ninjago: Masters of Spinjitzu), an episode of Ninjago: Masters of Spinjitzu
- Surge (music genre), a microgenre of hip-hop also known as hexD

== Other ==
- Surge S1, ARM-based System-on-Chips (SoCs) developed and manufactured by Xiaomi
- Iraq War troop surge of 2007 (usually referred to as "The Surge"), the revised U.S. counter-insurgency strategy in the Iraq War
- Afghanistan War troop surge of 2010, increase of U.S. troops in 2010
- Operation Metro Surge, ICE operation in Minnesota in late 2025 and early 2026
- The Surge: A Military History, a military history book by Kimberly Kagan about the Iraq War troop surge of 2007
- Stuttgart Surge, the American football franchise of the European League of Football

== See also ==
- Surgery (disambiguation)
- Serge (disambiguation)
- Gush (disambiguation)
