= Sako =

Sako is generally a Japanese surname and an Armenian first name, which is short for Sarkis.

Sako or SAKO may refer to:

== People with the surname ==
- Bakary Sako (born 1988), French-born Malian footballer
- Hygerta Sako, Albanian beauty pageant contestant
- Louis Raphaël I Sako (born 1948), Iraqi cleric, head of the Chaldean Catholic Church
- Mari Sako (born 1960), Japanese-British scholar of business
- Masato Sako (1946–2003), Japanese actor
- Morike Sako (born 1981), French footballer
- Kenichi Sako (born 1970), Japanese basketball player
- Sevkaretsi Sako (1870–1908), Armenian revolutionary
- Tomohisa Sako (born 1991), a Japanese singer
- Yago Alonso-Fueyo Sako (born 1979), Côte d'Ivoire-born Equatoguinean footballer
- Yugo Sako (c.1928–2012), Japanese film maker
- Samuel Ikome Sako (born 1966), one of the disputed Ambazonian presidents

== People with the first name ==
- Super Sako (born 1978) stage name of Sarkis Balasanyan, Armenian singer.
- Sako Chivitchian (born 1984), an Armenian-born American mixed martial arts (MMA) fighter.

== Other uses ==
- SAKO (programming language), a Polish 1950s programming language
- Sako Station, a railway station in Japan
- SAKO, a Finnish firearm manufacturer
- A diminutive form of the Armenian male name Sargis/Sarkis (disambiguation)
