= Sargis =

- Pronunciation: Assyrian Neo-Aramaic: [ˈsar.ɡɪs]; Armenian: [sɑɾˈkʰis], Western Armenian: [sɑɾˈkis]
- Gender: Masculine

Origin
- Origin: Armenian: Սարգիս Classical Syriac: ܣܪܓܝܣ
- Meaning: Unknown
- Region of origin: West Asia

Other names
- Alternative spelling: Sarkis, Sarkees, Serkis
- Nicknames: Seggy, Sagi, Sago, Sako, Seggo
- Related names: Sergius, Sargent

Sargis (Armenian: Սարգիս, Armenian pronunciation: [sɑɾˈkʰis]; Syriac: ܣܪܓܝܣ, Syriac pronunciation: [sar.ɡɪs]) is a masculine given name and surname that is used in both Armenian and Assyrian communities.

The name may also be alternatively used as Sarkis, used primarily by Armenians.

== Etymology ==
The name ultimately derives from the Latin personal name Sergius (name). The form Sargis is attested in Classical Syriac as ܣܪܓܝܣ (Sargīs). The German Armenologist, Heinrich Hübschmann, identified Armenian Սարգիս (Sargis) among a group of personal names found in early Armenian literature that were borrowed from Syriac Aramaic. Rüdiger Schmitt, following Hübschmann, specifically compares Armenian Sargis with Syriac Sargīs and derives the latter ultimately from Latin Sergius.

Thus, although the name is ultimately of Roman origin, the Armenian form Sargis reflects the Syriac form of the name.

== Assyrian tradition ==
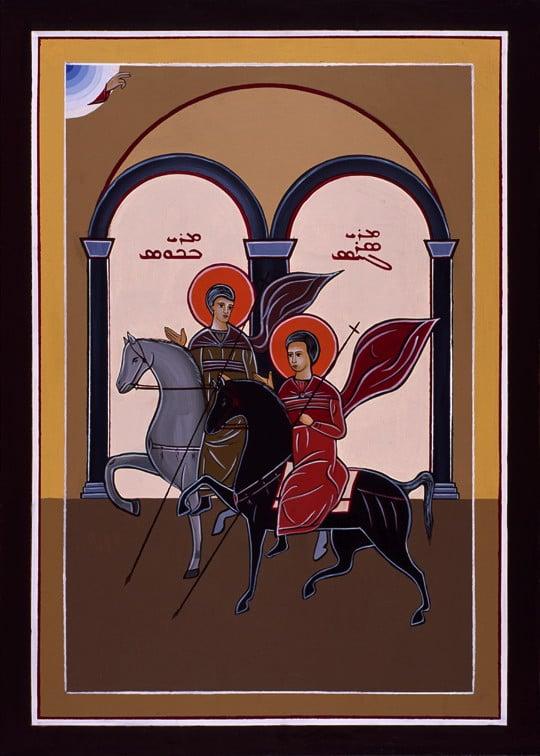
Saints Sergius and Bacchus with their names written in Syriac. Sargis is seen on the right in this iconography with the caption ܡܪܝ ܣܪܓܝܣ (Mar Sargis) above him.

In the Assyrian and broader Syriac Christian tradition, the name Sargis is closely associated with the veneration of Saint Sergius. His name is rendered in Classical Syriac as ܣܪܓܝܣ (’‘Sargīs’’, [sarˈɡiːs]), and also occurs with the honorific ܡܪܝ (’‘Mār’’, “Saint” or “Lord”) as ܡܪܝ ܣܪܓܝܣ (’‘Mār Sargīs’’). In modern Assyrian Neo-Aramaic, ‘‘Mār Sargīs’’ may be pronounced [mɑr ˈsar.ɡɪs].

According to the traditional account, Sergius was a Roman soldier who was martyred in the early 4th century at Resafa near the Euphrates after refusing to sacrifice to the Roman gods. From the 5th century onward, his shrine at Resafa—later known as Sergiopolis—developed into a major center of his cult, and Sergius became one of the most widely venerated saints of Syria. The University of Oxford’s ‘‘Cult of Saints in Late Antiquity’’ project similarly identifies Sergius as an internationally prominent saint among the Syriac-using Christian traditions and notes the extensive Syriac hagiographical tradition concerning such saints.

The Syriac literary tradition preserves the saints’ names together as ܣܪܓܝܣ ܘܒܟܘܣ (’‘Sargīs w-Bākōs’’, “Sergius and Bacchus”). The form ܣܪܓܝܣ is attested across multiple works in the Syriac hagiographical tradition; a variant spelling, ܣܐܪܓܝܣ (’‘Sārgīs’’), is also attested.

The name ‘‘Sargis’’ continues to be used as a personal name among Assyrians, while ‘‘Mār Sargīs’’ is used in the names of churches dedicated to Saint Sergius in the Assyrian homeland and the Assyrian diaspora.

== Notable peoples ==
=== Saints ===
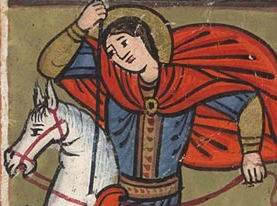
The Armenian Saint, Sargis the General

- Sargis the General, 4th century Armenian saint, not to be confused with Saint Sergius
- Sergius of Samarkand, Church of the East saint (fl. before the conversion of the Keraites around 1007)

=== Mononym ===
- Sargis of Aïbeg and Serkis, Mongol envoys to Europe
- Sargis of Seleucia-Ctesiphon, Patriarch of the Church of the East (860–872)
- Avag-Sargis III Zakarian (died 1268), Armenian noble and general in Georgia

=== Given name ===
- Sargis I Jaqeli (died 1285), Georgian nobleman of the House of Jaqeli and sovereign Prince
- Sargis II Hasan-Jalalyan (died 1828), last Catholicos of the Church of Caucasian Albania
- Sargis II Jaqeli (1271–1334), Georgian prince and ruler of the Principality of Samtskhe
- Sargis II Tmogveli, 13th-century Georgian statesman and writer
- Sargis Abrahamyan (1915–1969), Soviet-Armenian writer
- Sargis Adamyan (born 1993), Armenian footballer
- Sargis Aleksanyan (born 1983), Armenian politician
- Sargis Araratyan (1886–1943), Armenian politician in the First Republic of Armenia
- Sargis Baghdasaryan (1923–2001), Soviet-Armenian sculptor
- Sargis Barkhudaryan (1887–1973), Armenian composer, pianist and educator
- Sargis Galstyan (born 1979), Armenian actor and theatre director
- Sargis Hambardzumyan (1870–1944), Soviet Armenian politician and revolutionary
- Sargis Hovhannisian (1879–1919), better known as Aram Manukian, Armenian statesman and revolutionary
- Sargis Hovhannisyan (born 1968), Armenian football player
- Sargis Hovsepyan (born 1972), Armenian football player
- Sargis Kakabadze (1886–1967), Georgian historian and philologist
- Sargis Karapetyan (born 1990), Armenian football player
- Sargis Khachatryan (born 1964), Polish-Armenian former football player
- Sargis Khachatryan, Brazilian-Armenian Greco-Roman wrestler
- Sargis Khandanyan (born 1990), Armenian politician
- Sargis Lukashin (1883 or 1885–1937), Soviet-Armenian Bolshevik and statesman
- Sargis Manasyan (died 1920), acting Minister of Interior in the First Republic of Armenia
- Sargis Manoukyan, co-founder of the Armenian rock group Empyray
- Sargis Martirosjan (born 1986), Austrian-Armenian weightlifter
- Sargis Mehrabyan (died 1943), Armenian military figure
- Sargis Mubayeajean (1860–1937), pen name Atrpet, Armenian writer
- Sargis Paradzhanov (1924–1990), better known by his Russian name Sergei Parajanov, Soviet-Armenian film director
- Sargis Pitsak, early 14th century Armenian artist
- Sargis Sargsian (born 1973), former professional tennis player from Armenia
- Sargis Tmogveli, late 12th and early 13th century Georgian statesman and writer
- Sargis Tonoyan (born 1988), Armenian Greco-Roman wrestling
- Sargis Yosip (born 1950), Assyrian bishop from Iraq
- Sargis Zakarian (died 1187), founder of the Zakarid noble dynasty
- Sargis Reshaina, 6th century physician and priest who translated Greek medical works into Syriac
- Sargis Bkhira, 6th-century Assyrian monk who prophesied the coming of Prophet Muhammad

=== Surname ===
- Ashur Bet Sargis (born 1949), Assyrian composer and singer
- Hayden Sargis (born 2002), Assyrian American soccer player

== See also ==
- Sarkis
- Serge (given name)
- Serj
- Sargent (name)
- Sergius (name)
- St. Sarkis Church (disambiguation)
- Mar Sarkis (disambiguation)
