= Guglielmo Cinque =

Italian linguist

Guglielmo Cinque (born 1948 in La Spezia) is an Italian linguist and professor of linguistics at the Ca' Foscari University of Venice. He is one of the leading figures in modern minimalist syntax.

Cinque studied literature and linguistics at the University of Venice, at the University of Padua, and at the University of California, Berkeley. Since 1981 he has been a professor at the Ca' Foscari University. He is an honorary member of the Linguistic Society of America.

Cinque works in the fields of generative grammar and language typology. Together with Luigi Rizzi he belongs to the founding figures of cartographic syntax, a research area devoted to the fine structure of languages. He is the editor (together with Richard Kayne) of The Oxford Handbook of Comparative Syntax.

== Selected bibliography ==
- Cinque, G. (1999): Adverbs and Functional Heads. A Cross-Linguistic Perspective. Oxford University Press.
- Cinque, G. (1990): Types of Ā-dependencies. MIT Press.
