= Sarkis =

- Pronunciation: Armenian: [sɑɾˈkʰis], Western Armenian: [sɑɾˈkis]
- Gender: Masculine

Origin
- Origin: Armenian: Սարգիս
- Meaning: Unknown
- Region of origin: West Asia

Other names
- Alternative spelling: Sargis, Sarkees, Serkis
- Nicknames: Seggy, Sagi, Sago, Sako, Seggo
- Related names: Sergius, Sargent

Sarkis (Armenian: Սարգիս, Armenian pronunciation: [sɑɾˈkʰis]) is a masculine given name and surname. The name may also be alternatively spelled/written as Sargis, used by both Armenians and Assyrians.

== People with the mononym ==
Notable figures who use "Sarkis" as a mononym include:

- Sargis the General or Sarkis the Warrior, a 4th century martyr and military saint in the Armenian Apostolic Church
  - Saint Sarkis Monastery of Ushi, in Armenia
- Sarkis, the name of three Armenian patriarchs of Jerusalem
- Sarkis I of Armenia, Catholicos of the Armenian Apostolic Church 992–1019
- Sarkis II the Relic-Carrier, Catholicos of the Armenian Apostolic Church 1469–1474
- Sarkis Rizzi (1572–1638), head of the Maronite Church 1581–1597
- Aïbeg and Serkis, 13th century Mongol envoys to Europe
- Sergius and Bacchus, or variant spellings, 4th century Syrian Christian soldiers revered as martyrs and military saints

== People with the given name ==
Notable people who use "Sarkis" as a given name include:

- Sarkis Acopian (1926–2007), inventor, industrialist, environmentalist, and humanitarian
- Sarkis Aghajan Mamendo (born 1962), Iraqi Assyrian politician and government minister in Iraqi Kurdistan
- Sarkis Assadourian (born 1948), Armenian-Canadian politician and MP in the Canadian Parliament (House of Commons)
- Sarkis Assadourian (born 1948), Iranian-Armenian fencer
- Sarkis Balasanian (born 1978), musical artist
- Sarkis Balyan (1835–1899), Ottoman Armenian designer and artist
- Sarkis Bedikian (1908–1944), Armenian resistance fighter during the Battle of Marseille
- Sarkis Bohosjan (born 1941), Bulgarian chess player
- Sarkis Diranian (1854–1918), Armenian orientalist painter
- Sarkis Djanbazian (1913–1963), Iranian-Armenian artist
- Sarkis Dkhrouni (1898–1929), Armenian politician and writer
- Sarkis Elgkian (born 1972), retired Armenian-Greek wrestler
- Sarkis Erganian (1870–1950), Ottoman Armenian painter
- Sarkis Hayrapetyan (born 1992), Armenian figure skater
- Sarkis Hovanessian (1879–1919), the birth name of Aram Manukian, Armenian statesman and revolutionary
- Sarkis Jebejian (1864–1920), Armenian military leader
- Sarkis Kasyan (1876–1937), Soviet-Armenian statesman and politician
- Sarkis Katchadourian (1886–1947), Armenian artist
- Sarkis Lole, 20th-century Ottoman Armenian architect
- Sarkis Martirosyan (1900–1984), Soviet-Armenian general in the Red Army
- Sarkis Mazmanian (born 1972), Armenian-American microbiologist
- Sarkis Minassian (1873–1915), Armenian activist killed during the Armenian genocide
- Sarkis Moussa (born 1929), Lebanese boxer
- Sarkis Mubayeajian (1860–1937), better known by his pen name Atrpet, Armenian novelist and writer
- Sarkis Ordyan (1918–2003), Ukrainian-Armenian painter
- Sarkis Sarchayan (1947–2021), Soviet table tennis player
- Sarkis Soghanalian (1929–2011), nicknamed Merchant of Death, an international private arms dealer
- Sarkis Torossian (1891–1954), Ottoman Armenian military general
- Sarkis Zabunyan (born 1938), better known as just Sarkis, Armenian-Turkish-French conceptual artist
- Sarkis Zeitlian (1930–1985), Lebanese Armenian politician and journalist

=== Middle name ===
- Calouste Sarkis Gulbenkian (1869–1955), British Armenian businessman and philanthropist
- Nubar Sarkis Gulbenkian (1896–1972), British Armenian businessman and socialite

== People with the surname ==
Notable people who use "Sarkis" as a surname include:

- Abe Sarkis (1913–1991), American mobster (Boston)
- Angela Sarkis (born 1955), American businesswoman
- Charles Sarkis (1940–2018), American restaurateur and dog racetrack owner
- Elias Sarkis (1924–1985), Lebanese lawyer and politician, President of Lebanon from 1976 to 1982
- Ghassan Sarkis (born 1957), Lebanese-French basketball coach
- Hashim Sarkis (born 1964), Lebanese architect
- Inanna Sarkis (born 1993), Assyrian-Bulgarian YouTuber
- Joseph Sarkis (born 1949), Lebanese politician and government minister
- Joseph Elian Sarkis (1856–1932), Syrian writer and translator
- Karl Sarkis (born 1986), Lebanese basketball player
- Kristyan Sarkis (born 1985), Lebanese type designer and lettering artist
- Nazira Farah Sarkis (born 1962), Syrian-Armenian former Minister of Environment Affairs
- Rolf Sarkis, founder of the European Film Actor School
- Stephanie Moulton Sarkis, specialist in the treatment of ADD/ADHD and medical writer

== See also ==
- Sarki (disambiguation)
- Sargis, a name in Armenian and Assyrian communities
- Sar Giz, a village in West Azerbaijan Province, Iran
- Sarkies (disambiguation)
- Sergia gens
- Sergius (disambiguation)
- Serkis, a surname
- St. Sarkis Church (disambiguation)
- Mar Sarkis (disambiguation)
- Sarkis, a fictional character from Swordheart, a 2018 novel
