= Tsovinar =

Tsovinar may refer to:

- Tsovinar, Armenia, a town
- Tsovinar (mother), a folk character
