= Luigi Rizzi =

Luigi Rizzi may refer to:

- Luigi Rizzi (footballer) (1907–?), Italian footballer with Inter Milan in the 1930s
- Luigi Rizzi (linguist) (born 1952), Italian linguist
