= Yot Verk Matur =

Armenian 14th century memorial

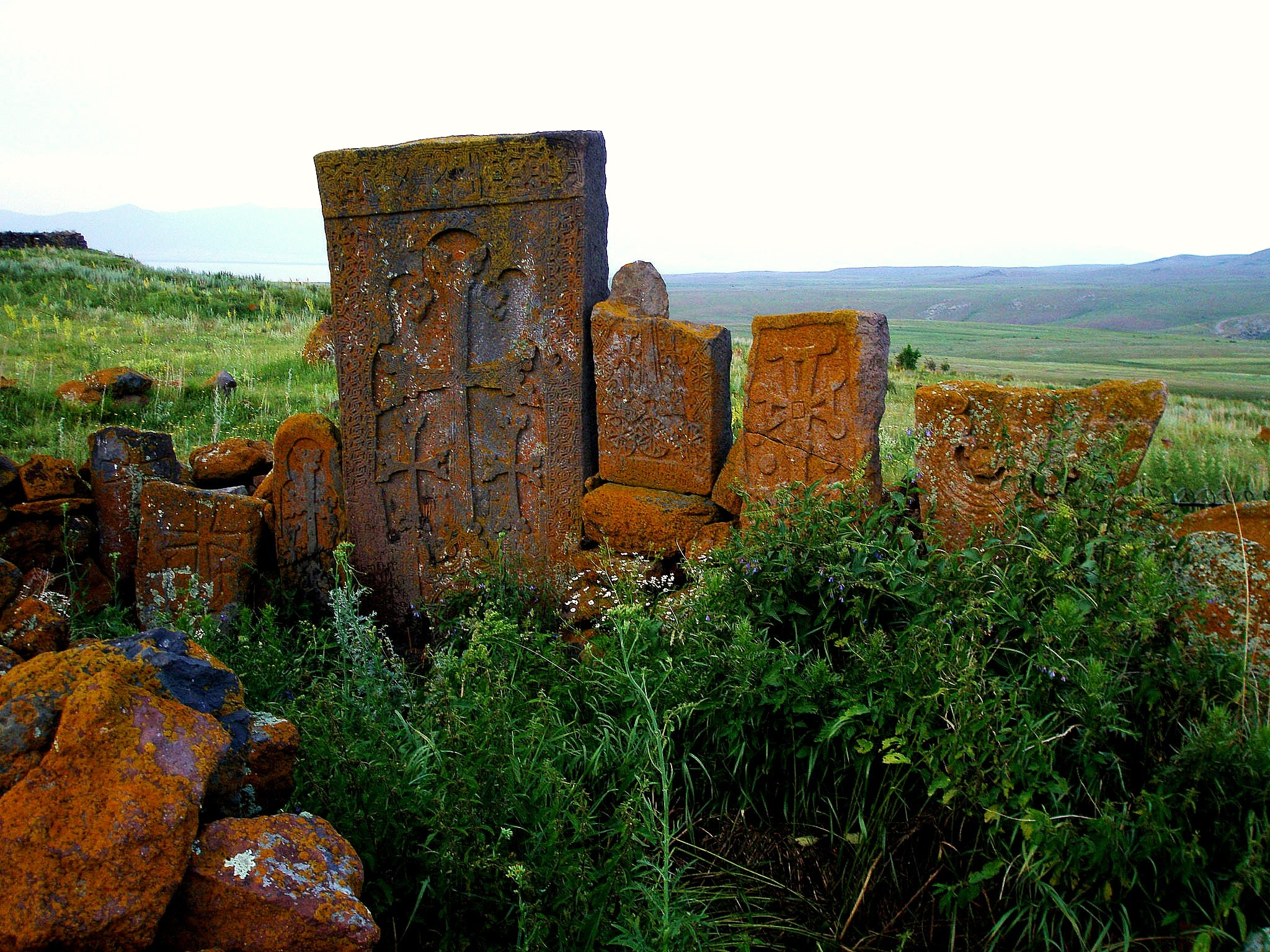
Yot Verk Matur memorial at the ruins of Khrber.

Yot Verk Matur (Armenian: Յոթ Վերք Մատուռ; meaning, "Seven Wounds Chapel") is a small monument erected around the late 14th-century in remembrance of seven lords of seven villages. Local folklore tells that when the Turko-Mongol conqueror Timur Lenk came into Armenia, he made war against the seven lords. As a result of the battles, the lords were killed and their villages were destroyed by Timur. Seven khachkars were placed in a row upon a low-rock wall enclosure as a memorial to the lords. The center khachkar dominates the others.

The memorial is located in the mountains 8 kilometres (5.0 mi) south-east of the ruins of the fortified Urartian settlement of Teyseba, also known as Odzaberd and near the modern-day village of Tsovinar. Geographically it is located at the south-east corner of Lake Sevan, which can be seen in the distance at a highpoint amongst the ruins of Khrber where the memorial lies within. There are a number of medieval khachkars, headstones, and tombs in Khrber. The oldest graves are located at the base of a hill just south of the ruins.
