= Serg =

Serg may refer to:

- Serg Bell (born 1971), Singaporean businessman entrepreneur, investor and speaker
- Serg., taxonomic author abbreviation of Lidia Palladievna Sergievskaya (1897–1970), Soviet botanist, professor, and herbarium curator
- Serg., abbreviation for Sergeant, a police and military rank

== See also ==
- Van Serg, a lunar crater
- Serge (disambiguation)
- Serj, a given name
