= Nizzi =

Nizzi is an Italian surname. Notable people with the surname include:

- Claudio Nizzi (born 1938), Italian comic author
- Enrico Nizzi (born 1990), Italian cross-country skier

== See also ==
- Rizzi
