= Socko =

Socko may refer to:

== Characters ==
- Socko, a character from the television sitcom iCarly
- Mr. Socko, a sock puppet used by Mick Foley in pro wrestling.
- Socko, a sock puppet used by the Ventriloquist, an enemy of Batman in DC Comics
- Socko, a character from the cartoon Randy Cunningham: 9th Grade Ninja

== People ==
- Socko, nickname of John Wiethe, American sports player
- Socko, later Sox, nickname of Tsuyako Kitashima, activist

=== as surname ===
- Bartosz Soćko, Polish chess player
- Kamila Soćko, Polish rower
- Monika Soćko, Polish chess player

== Other uses ==
- Johnny Socko, third wave ska band

== See also ==
- Sako (disambiguation)
- Socco, small cubicuboctahedron
