= Sarkies =

Sarkies is a surname. Notable people with the surname include:

- Sarkies Brothers, hoteliers
- Duncan Sarkies, New Zealand screenwriter and playwright
- Kristian Sarkies (born 1986), Australian soccer player
- Robert Sarkies (born 1967), New Zealand film director and screenwriter

== See also ==
- Sarkis (disambiguation)
