= Serkis =

Serkis is a surname. Notable people with the name include:

- Andy Serkis (born 1964), British film actor, director and author
- Louis Ashbourne Serkis (born 2004), British actor
- Ruby Ashbourne Serkis (born 1998), British actress
- Serkis (ambassador)

== See also ==
- Sarkis (disambiguation)
