= St. Sarkis Church =

St. Sarkis Church, Saint Sarkis Church, or Sargis (Armenian: Սուրբ Սարգիս եկեղեցի) may refer to a number of Armenian Apostolic churches named after Sargis the General:

== Armenia ==
- Saint Sarkis Cathedral, Yerevan in Yerevan, Armenia
- St. Sarkis Church (Ashtarak, Aragatsotn, Armenia) in Ashtarak, Aragatsotn, Armenia
- St. Sarkis Church (Berd, Tavush, Armenia) in Berd, Tavush, Armenia
- St. Sarkis Church (Bjni, Armenia) in Bjni, Kotayk, Armenia
- St. Sarkis Church (Dovegh, Tavush, Armenia) in Dovegh, Tavush, Armenia
- St. Sarkis Church (Tsovinar, Gegharkunik, Armenia) in Tsovinar, Gegharkunik, Armenia
- St. Sarkis Church (Yerevan, Armenia) in Yerevan, Armenia

== Azerbaijan ==
- St. Sarkis Church (Ganja, Azerbaijan) in Ganja, Ganja-Dashkasan, Azerbaijan
- St. Sarkis Church (Shahbuzkand, Azerbaijan), in Shahbuzkand, Nakhchivan, Azerbaijan

== Georgia ==
- St. Sarkis Church (Tbilisi, Georgia) in Tbilisi, Georgia

== Iran ==
- Saint Sarkis Cathedral, Tehran in Tehran, Iran
- St. Sarkis Church (Isfahan, Iran) in Isfahan, Iran
- St. Sarkis Church (Khoy, West Azerbaijan, Iran) in Khoy, West Azerbaijan, Iran
- St. Sarkis Church (Sir, West Azerbaijan, Iran) in Sir, West Azerbaijan, Iran
- St. Sarkis Church (Tabriz, East Azerbaijan, Iran) in Tabriz, East Azerbaijan, Iran

== Syria ==
- Saint Sarkis Cathedral, Damascus in Damascus, Syria

== Turkey ==
- Tekor Basilica, also known as St. Sarkis Church (Digor, Kars, Turkey), a 5th-century Armenian church, in Digor, Kars

== United Kingdom ==
- St. Sarkis Church (London), in Kensington, London, England, U.K.

== United States ==
- St. Sarkis Church (Dearborn, Michigan) in Dearborn, Michigan, U.S.

== See also ==
- Sarkis (disambiguation)
- Mar Sarkis (disambiguation) list of monasteries
- Saints Sergius and Bacchus
