= Khrber =

Armenian town ruins

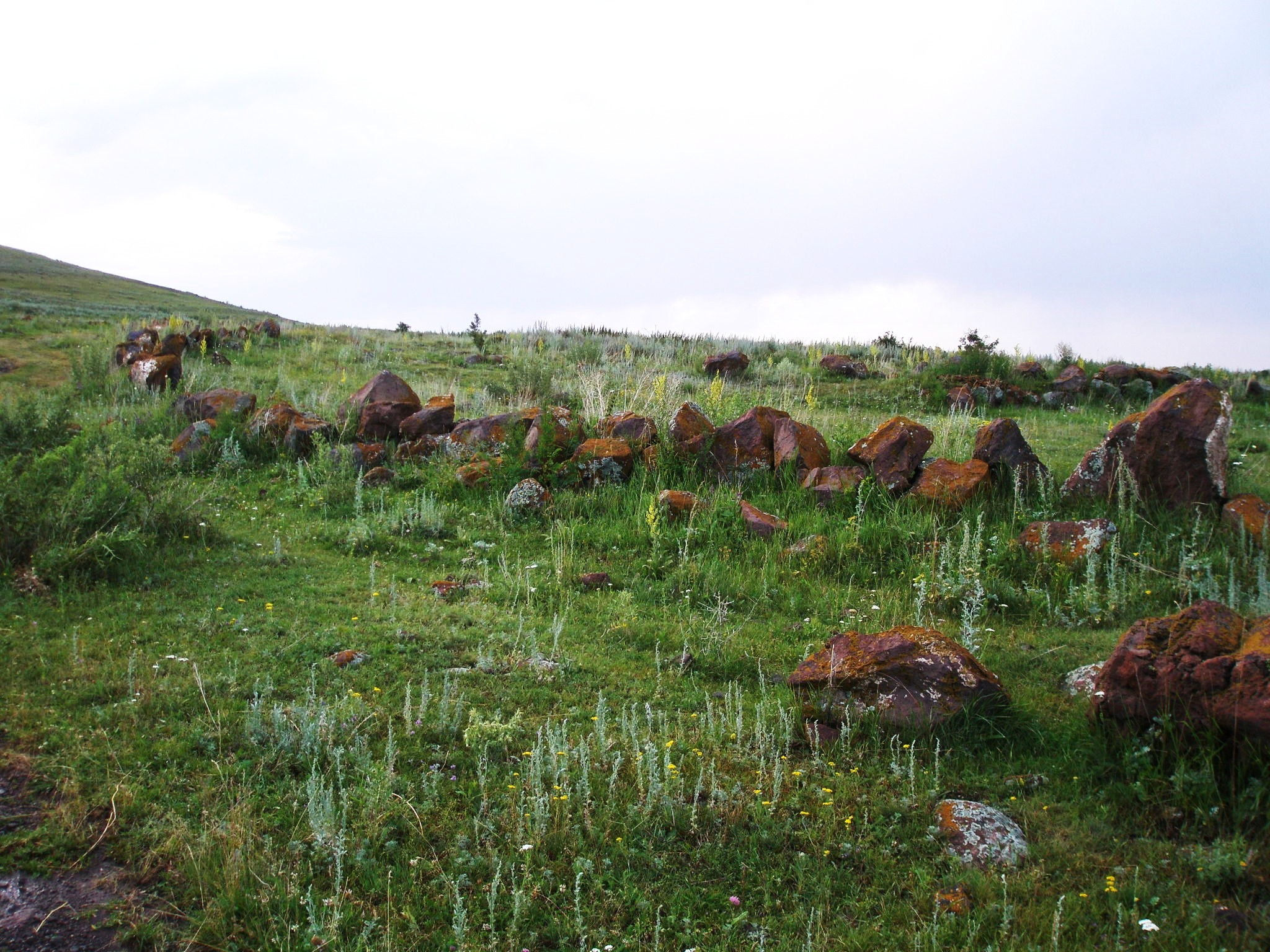
Ruins of the ancient city Khrber.

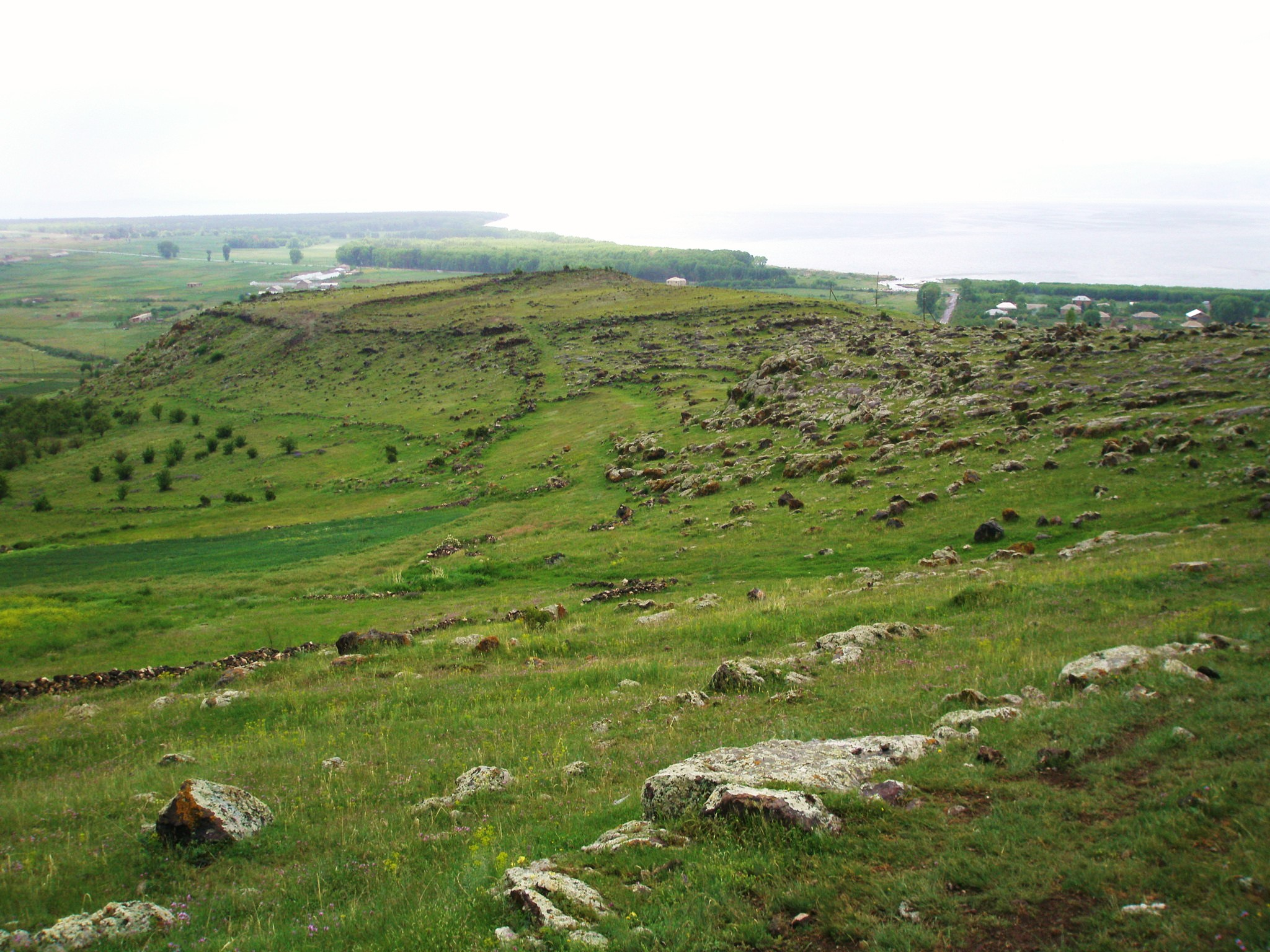
Overlooking the ruins of Ishkanaberd and Lake Sevan.

The Khrber (Armenian: Խռբեր; Transliteration: xṙbēr; also Karmrashen) ruins are the remains of an ancient town situated in the mountains 8 kilometers south-east from the ruins of the fortified Urartian city of Teyseba, also known as Odzaberd and Ishkanaberd. Geographically it is located at the south-east corner of Lake Sevan, which can be seen in the distance at a highpoint amongst the ruins. The name is derived from the local dialect of the villages near south-east Lake Sevan and roughly translates to “ruins”. Foundations of large rectangular stone structures, portions of thick fortified walls, and a large cemetery with ancient tombs, headstones, and khachkars can still be seen. The majority of the oldest graves are located at the base of a hill just south of the ruins of Khrber. Within the ruins, there is a memorial of seven khachkars named Yot Verk Matur meaning "Seven Wounds Chapel". It is from approximately the 14th century and is dedicated to seven lords of seven villages that died during this time. Another more ancient cemetery lies beyond the large foothill just south of Khrber.

== Folklore of Khrber ==
Folklore from the village of Tsovinar tells that long ago the Lord of Khrber was married, and that the Lord of the city of Ishkanaberd, meaning “Lord’s Castle” (located approximately 8 km away) wanted the other lord’s wife as his own even though he himself was already married. An affair ensued between the two, and soon the Lord of Khrber discovered this and became furious. He decided that he would destroy the city of Ishkanaberd, which was at that time considered impenetrable because of its very thick walls. The Lord of Ishkanaberd's wife also found out that an affair had been taking place between her husband and the other lord's wife.

While the Lord of Ishkanaberd was sleeping, his own wife bound him so that he could not escape and went to let the Lord of Khrber into the walled city. The wife of the Lord of Khrber whom the other lord was having an affair with learned what had happened and came to free him. She did so and the two of them escaped with their lives that night from the city on horseback through a cave located a very short distance away from Ishkanaberd. The cave can still be seen to this day and the entrance is quite large. During that time it is said that the cave led from Ishkanaberd to a village some distance away, and that the cavern's tunnel which has since collapsed could fit a person sitting on horseback from one end to the other.

The Lord of Khrber destroyed the fortified city of Ishkanaberd and said, “Now nothing shall live in this land except snakes and scorpions!” Therefore the name of the other city was referred to henceforth as Odzaberd meaning “Serpent’s Castle”.
