= Tsovinar, Armenia =

Village in Gegharkunik, Armenia

Tsovinar Ծովինար
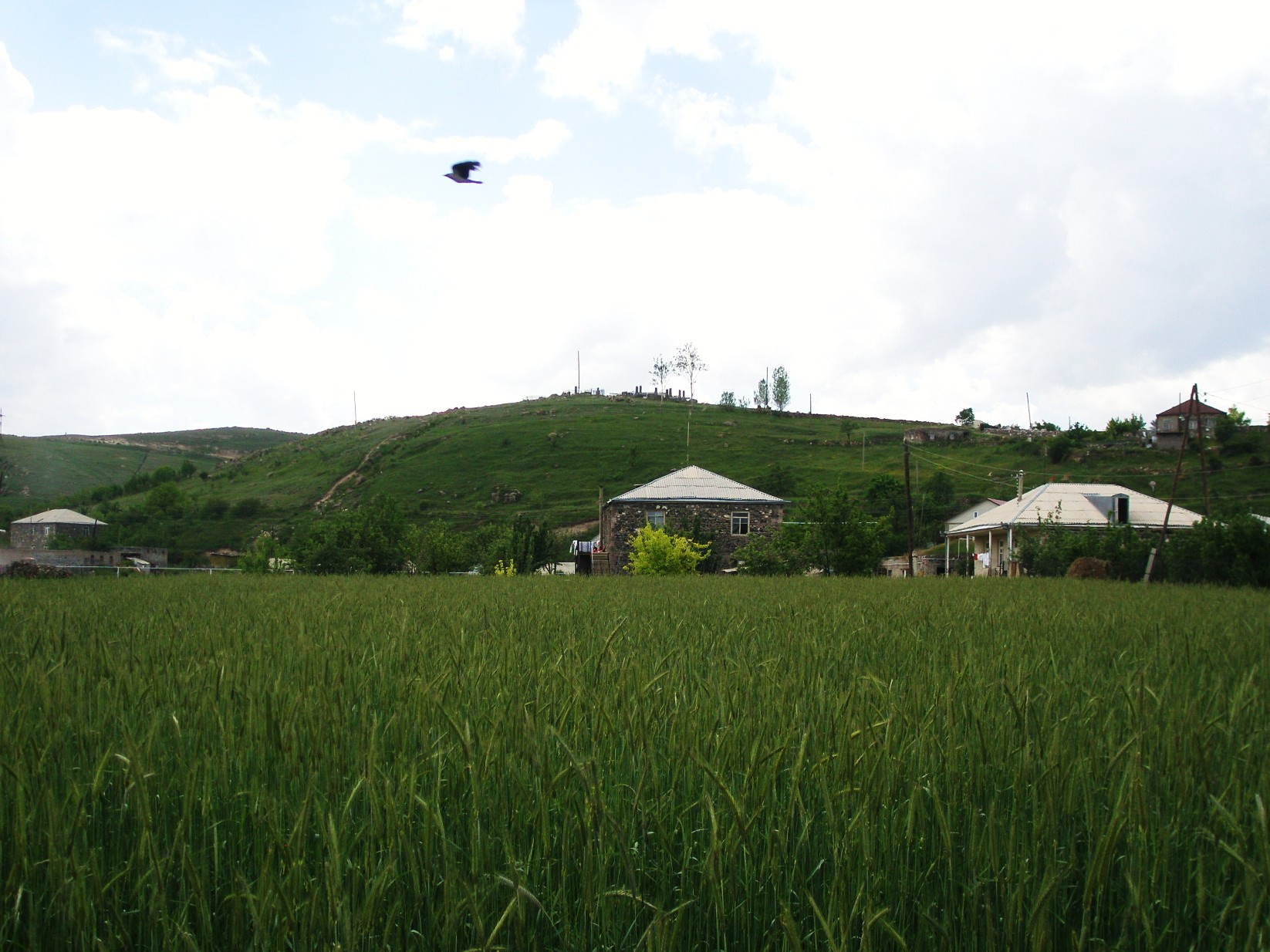
- A view of Tsovinar with a cemetery on the hill in the background, June 2009.

- Location within Armenia Location within Gegharkunik
- Coordinates: 40°09′36″N 45°27′59″E
- Country: Armenia
- Province: Gegharkunik
- Municipality: Martuni
- Elevation: 1,924 m (6,312 ft)

Population (2011)
  - Total: 5,115
- Time zone: UTC+4 (AMT)
- Postal code: 1411

Tsovinar (Armenian: Ծովինար) is a village in the Martuni Municipality of the Gegharkunik Province of Armenia, located to the south of Lake Sevan.

== Etymology ==
The name "Tsovinar" is derived from Tsovinar, the Armenian goddess of water, sea, and rain.

== Historical heritage ==
East of the village is the Urartian site of Odzaberd founded by Rusa I around 735-713 BC, with a lengthy but worn cuneiform inscription nearby recounting his conquest of twenty-three nations. It is considered to be the best-preserved Urartian fortification in the Sevan Basin. Below Odzaberd is the point where the Arpa-Sevan Tunnel empties into Lake Sevan. On the hill south of the road that is adjacent to the fortress, are boulders that form walls that are especially visible along the southern boundary.

Just outside the village headed southeast are numerous stones scattered across the side of one of the hills. It is all that remains of an old village destroyed by war long ago. Some human bones and old coins have been found in this area by villagers from Tsovinar, attesting to the story of what had once taken place there. In close proximity are two small single-nave churches. The church of Topi Galugh sits on a hill southeast between Tsovinar and Artsvanist, while the church of Surb Sarkis (1100-1200) sits south of the village of Tsovinar on a promontory overlooking a small gorge. Next to Surb Sarkis is a small cemetery, and just below the church in the gorge is a small spring and cave. Further south are the remains of the ancient village of Karmrashen, which contains the church of Hnevank, the monument of Yot Verk Matur, numerous khachkars, and some tombs.

== Gallery ==
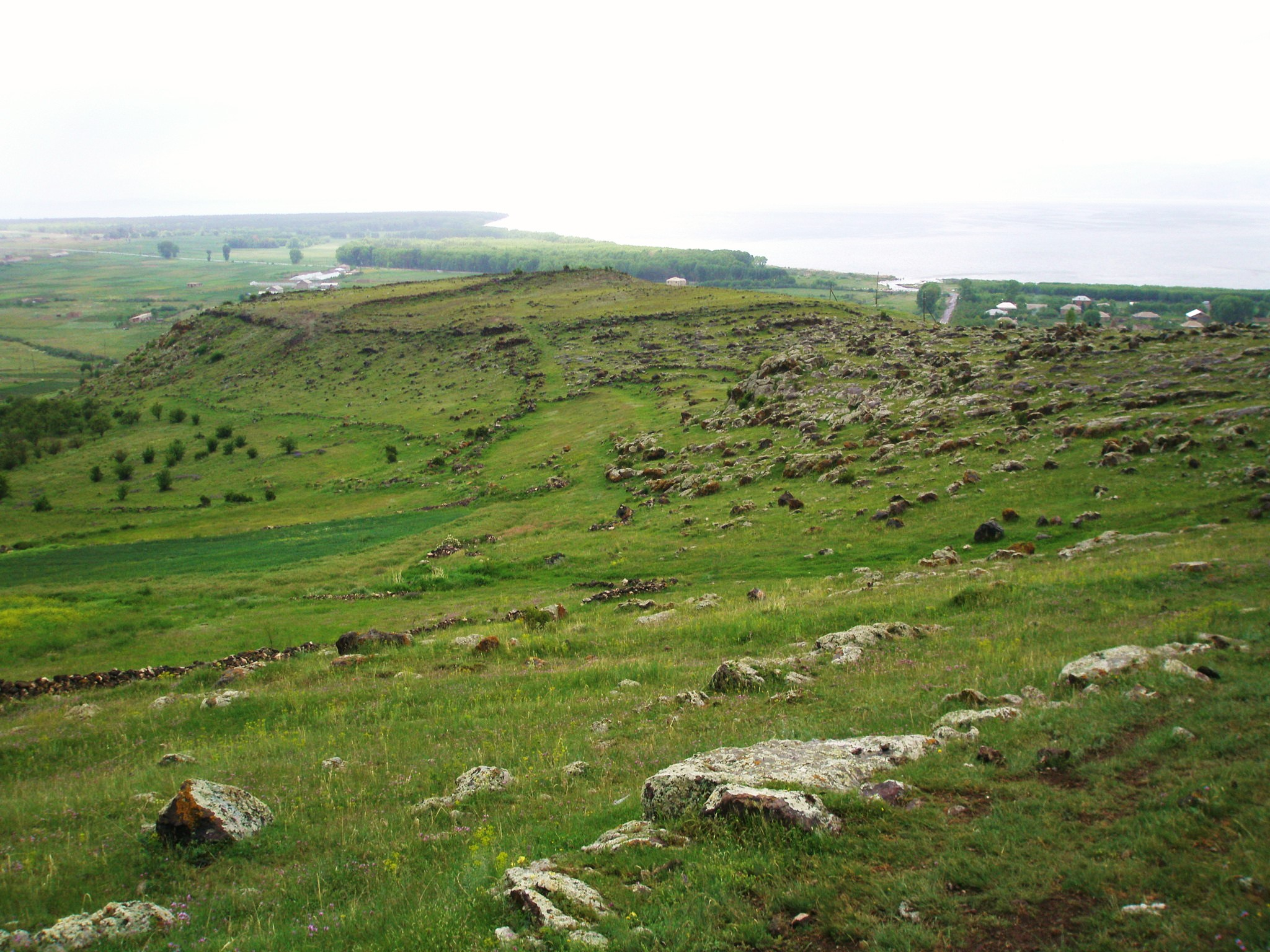
Overlooking Teyseba and Lake Sevan. Tsovinar is located in the distance to the left.

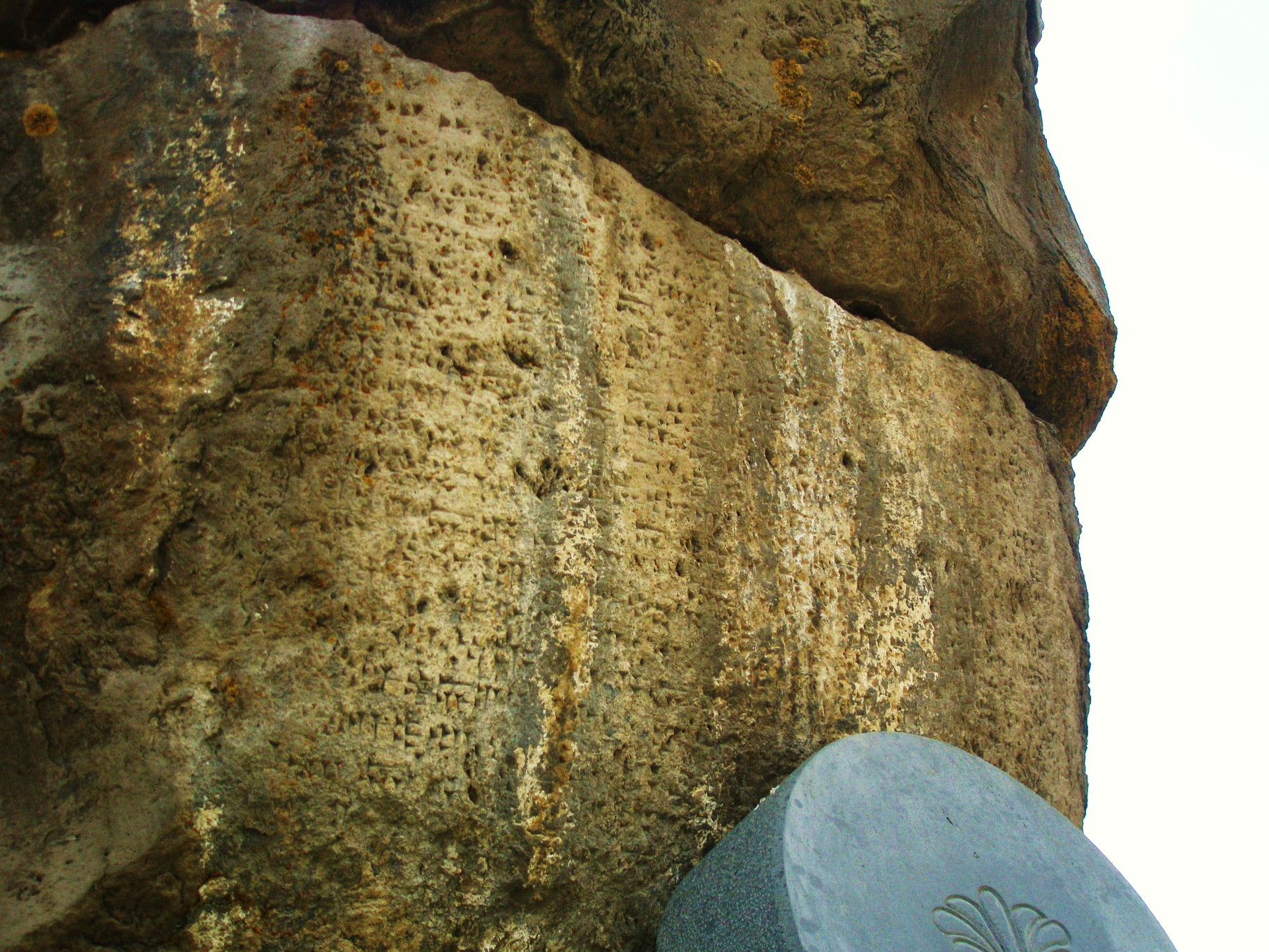
Cuneiform inscription of Rusa I at the base of the hill of Teyseba, near the road leading towards Artsvanist.

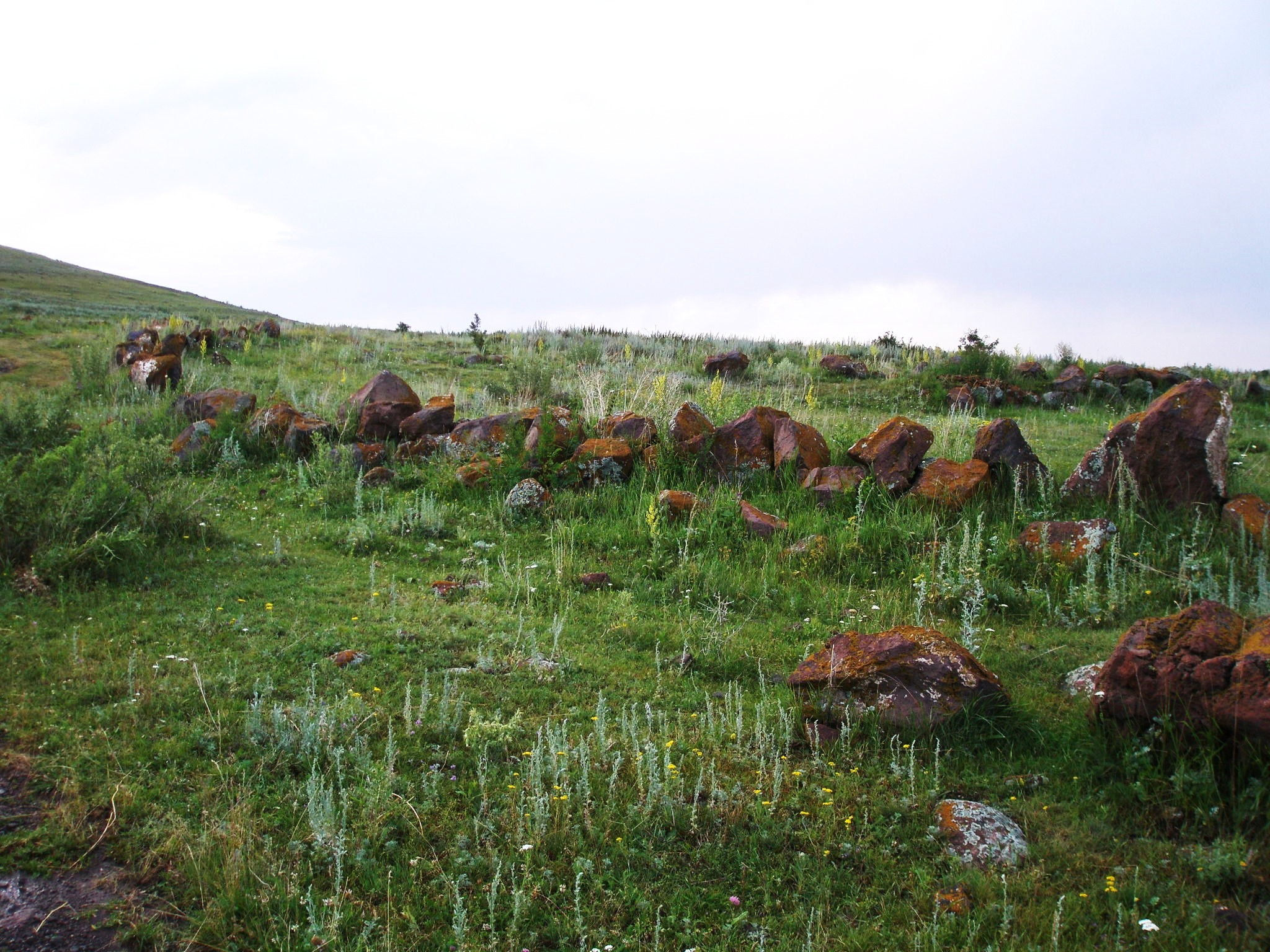
Ruins of Khrbeh

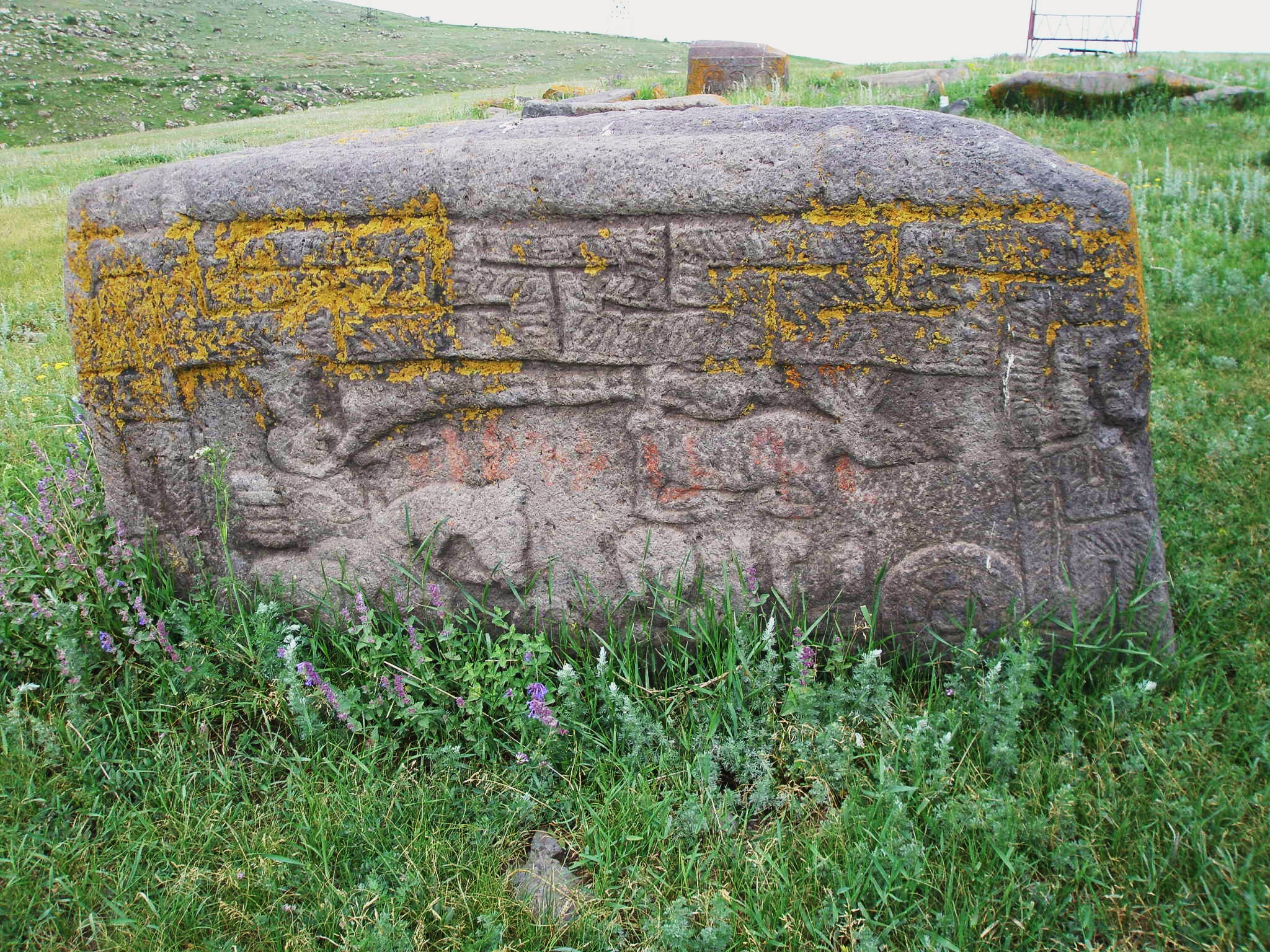
Medieval grave outside of St. Sarkis of Tsovinar

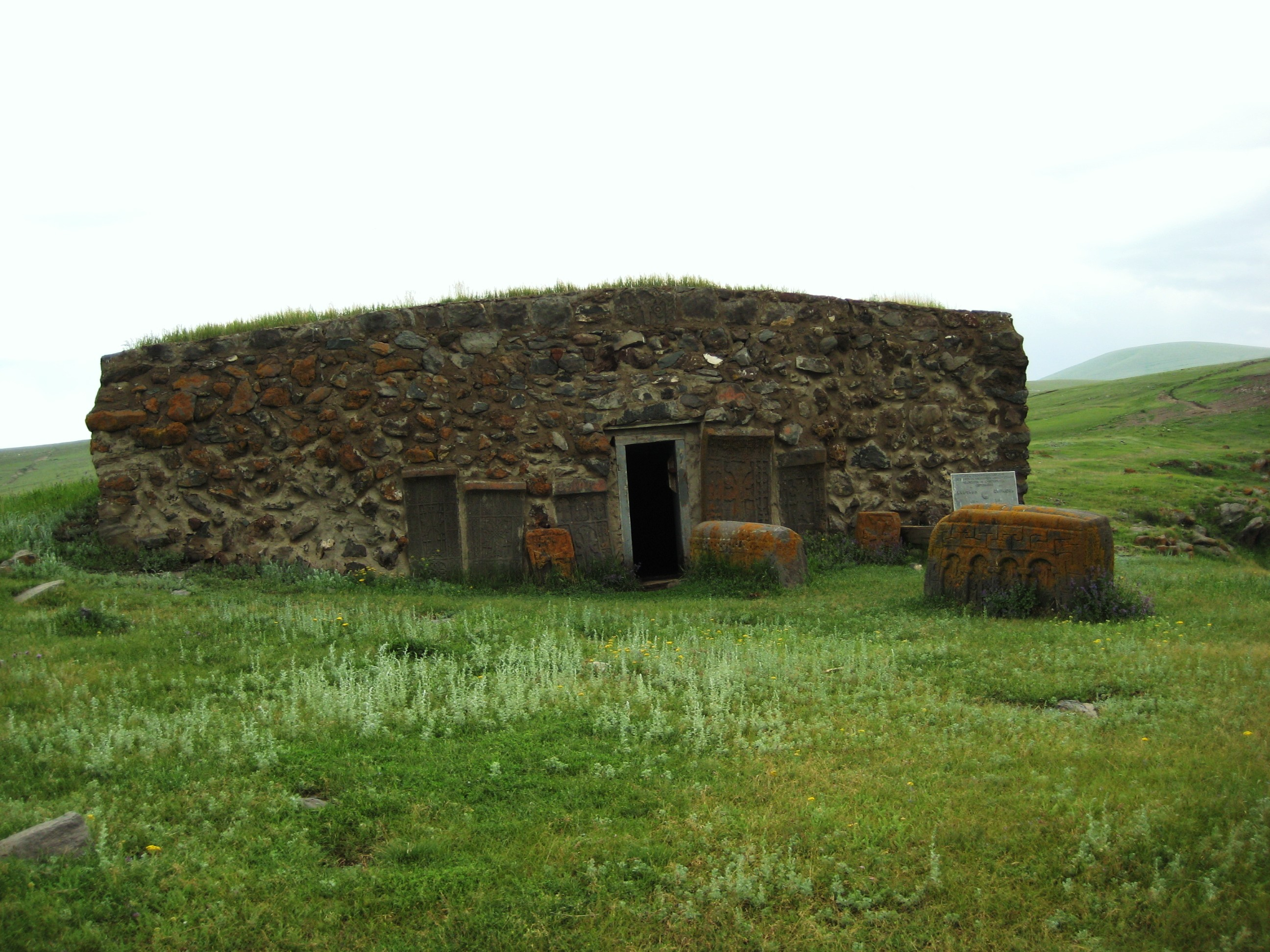
St. Sarkis of Tsovinar

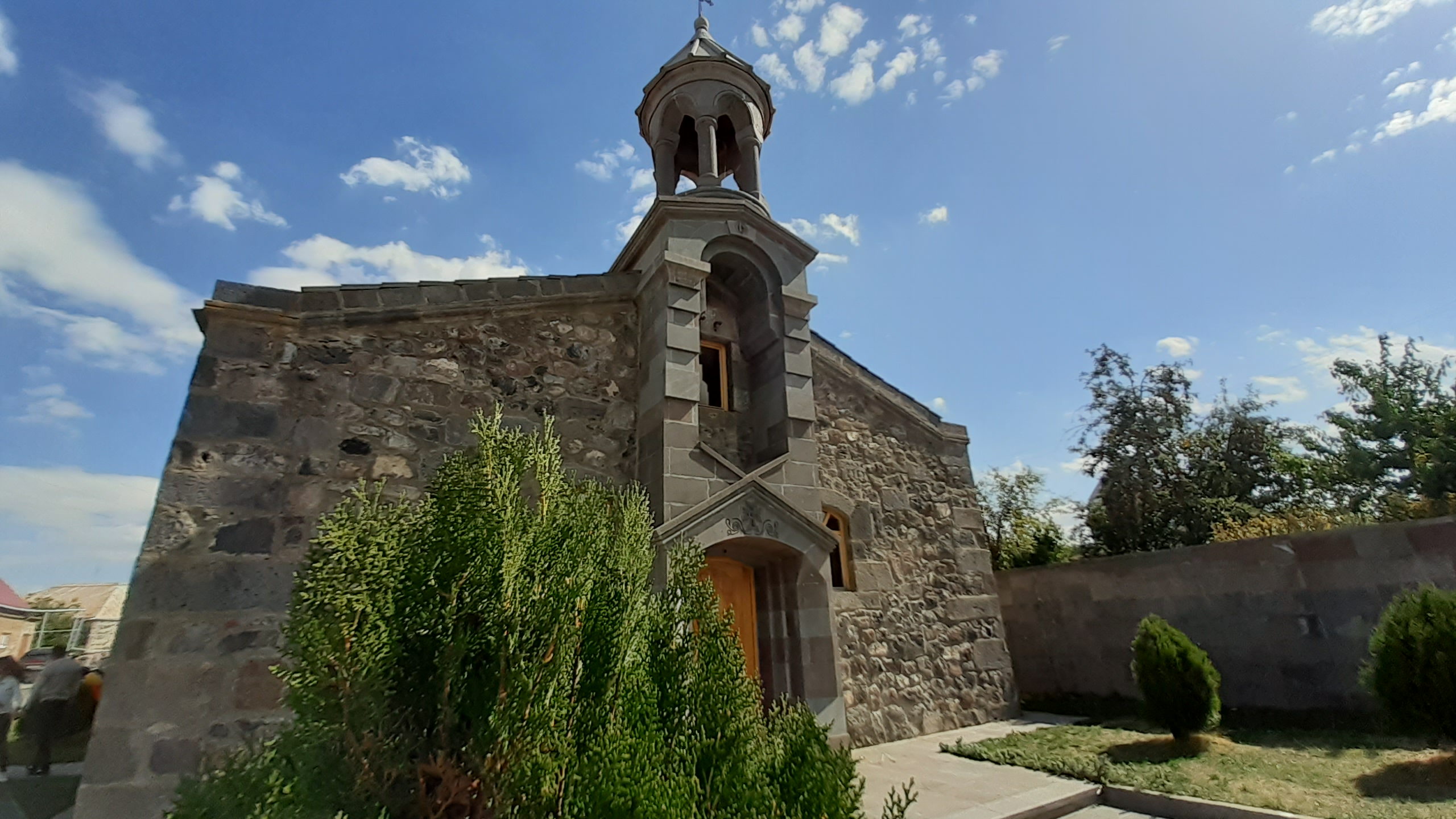
St. Astvatsatsin Church in Tsovinar, from 1900
