= Miss Europe 1996 =

International beauty pageant

- Date: 28 September 1996
- Venue: Tirana, Albania
- Entrants: 35
- Placements: 12
- Debuts: Armenia; Georgia
- Withdrawals: Austria; Hungary; Norway; Scotland
- Returns: Armenia; Cyprus; Georgia
- Winner: Marie-Claire Harrison; England

Miss Europe 1996 was the 51st edition of the Miss Europe pageant and the 40th edition under the Mondial Events Organization. It was held in Tirana, Albania on 28 September 1996. Marie-Claire Harrison of England was crowned Miss Europe 1996 by outgoing titleholder Monika Žídková of the Czech Republic.

== Results ==
=== Placements ===
Placement	Contestant
Miss Europe 1996	England – Marie-Claire Harrison
1st Runner-Up	Belarus – Yelena Shcherbak
2nd Runner-Up	Israel – Kim Roslikov
3rd Runner-Up	Greece – Nonie Dounia
4th Runner-Up	Spain – Aurelia Barrera
Top 12	Albania – Hygerta Sako; Belgium – Laëtitia Bureau; Finland – Anitra Ahtola; France – Caroline Cléry; Italy – Anna Valle; Slovakia – Marcela Jánová; Turkey – Pinar Yiğit

== Contestants ==
- Albania – Hygerta Sako
- Armenia – Karine Khachatrian
- Belarus – Yelena Shcherbak
- Belgium – Laëtitia Bureau
- Bulgaria – Svetlana Stoianova
- Cyprus – Christiana Stavrinides (Christina Stavrinidou)
- Czech Republic – Iva Kubelková
- Denmark – Anette Oldenborg
- England – Marie-Claire Harrison
- Estonia – Kaie Kaas
- Finland – Anitra Ahtola
- France – Caroline Cléry
- Georgia – Natia Gogichiashvili
- Germany – Miriam Ruppert
- Greece – Nonie Dounia
- Holland – Virginia Koopmans
- Iceland – Sólveig Lilja Guðmundsdóttir
- Ireland – Joanne Black
- Israel – Kim Roslikov
- Italy – Anna Valle
- Latvia – Ilvita Liepiņa
- Lithuania – Sonata Pulkauskaitė
- Luxembourg – Christiane Lorent
- Malta – Donna Evans Xwereb
- Poland – Agata Dworniczek
- Portugal – Rita Carvalho
- Romania – Angela Patau
- Russia – Victoria Bogdanova
- Slovak Republic – Marcela Jánová
- Spain – Aurelia Barrera Escalera
- Sweden – Anna Olin
- Switzerland – Mariana Barleycorn
- Turkey – Pinar Yiğit
- Ukraine – Radmila Lalazarova
- Wales – Zara Baynes

== Notes ==
=== Withdrawals ===
- Austria – No delegate sent
- Hungary – No delegate sent
- Norway – No delegate sent
- Scotland – No delegate sent

=== Debuts/Returns ===
- Armenia
- Georgia

=== Returns ===
- Cyprus

== "Comité Officiel et International Miss Europe" Competition ==
Miss Europa 1996
- Date: 4 October 1996
- Venue: İzmir, Turkey
- Entrants: 30
- Placements: 3
- Debuts: Bulgaria, Croatia, Israel, Macedonia FYRO, Moldova, New Caledonia (French Territory), Russia, Scandinavia, Turkish Republic of Northern Cyprus, Ukraine & United Kingdom
- Withdrawals: Belgium, Denmark, England, Germany, Ireland & Portugal
- Returns: Andorra, Luxembourg, Mediterranean, Monaco, Poland
- Winner: Mimmi Gunnarsson (dethroned); Sweden; Jenni Rautawaara (succeeded); Finland
- Miss Elegance: Tanya Lise Chitty; New Caledonia (French Territory)

From 1951 to 2002 there was a rival Miss Europe competition organized by the "Comité Officiel et International Miss Europe". This was founded in 1950 by Jean Raibaut in Paris, the headquarters later moved to Marseille. The winners wore different titles like Miss Europe, Miss Europa or Miss Europe International.

This year's competition took place in İzmir, Turkey. There were 30 contestants from 28 countries and 2 regions. At the end, Mimmi Gunnarsson of Sweden was originally crowned as Miss Europa 1996; however she was later dethroned. The crown then went to Jenni Rautawaara of Finland. Both Gunnarsson and Rautawaara succeeded predecessor Yolanda Marcos Gonzales of Spain.

=== Placements ===
Placement	Contestant
Miss Europa 1996	Sweden – Mimmi Gunnarsson (dethroned)
1st Runner-Up	Finland – Jenni Rautawaara (succeeded)
2nd Runner-Up	Scotland – Kelly Hodson

=== Special awards ===
Award	Contestant
Miss Elegance	New Caledonia – Tanya Lise Chitty

=== Contestants ===
- Albania – Medera Moxma Diaz
- Andorra – Helena Bourre
- Bulgaria – Adelina Dinkova
- Croatia – Suzanna Miltanovica
- Cyprus – Sureyya Eray
- Finland – Jenni Rautawaara
- France – Cynthia Lustig
- Greece – Teresa Rousso
- Holland – Kelly Smit
- Israel – Olga Makaron
- Luxembourg – Marilyne Rambourt
- Macedonia FYRO – UNKNOWN
- Mediterranean – Cathy Palombo
- Moldova – Monica Zamfir
- Monaco – Geraldine Flechmon
- New Caledonia – Tanya Lise Chitty
- Norway – Carina Mjones
- Poland – Beata Palega
- Romania – Iolanda Bellu
- Russia – Polina Gavia
- Scandinavia – Marika Toppari
- Scotland – Kelly Hodson
- Spain – Cristina Moreno
- Sweden – Mimmi Gunnarsson
- Switzerland – Katie Pastori
- Turkey – Bilge Kara
- Turkish Republic of Northern Cyprus – UNKNOWN
- Ukraine – Natalia Egorava
- United Kingdom – Anna Marie Todino
- Wales – Trudi Leeson
