= Serge =

Serge may refer to:

- Serge (fabric), a type of twill fabric
- Serge (llama) (2005–2020), a llama in the Cirque Franco-Italien and internet meme
- Serge (name), a masculine given name (includes a list of people with this name)
- Serge (post), a hitching post used among the Buryats and Yakuts
- Serge synthesizer, a modular synthesizer

== See also ==
- Overlock, a type of stitch known as "serger" in North America
- Surge (disambiguation)
- Serg (disambiguation)
