= Cartographic syntax =

School of thought in generative syntax theory

In linguistics, Cartographic syntax, or simply Cartography, is a branch of Generative syntax. The basic assumption of Cartographic syntax is that syntactic structures are built according to the same patterns in all languages of the world. It is assumed that all languages exhibit a richly articulated structure of hierarchical projections with specific meanings. Cartography belongs to the tradition of generative grammar and is regarded as a theory belonging to the Principles and Parameters theory. The founders of Cartography are the Italian linguists Luigi Rizzi and Guglielmo Cinque.

== History ==
The Cartographic approach was developed with “the emergence of syntactic analyses that identified and implied functional heads” in the literature of the 1980s. Functional heads are the minimal projection of functional categories such as Agreement (Agr), Tense, Aspect and Mood (TAM). They are different than lexical heads as they are not part of lexical categories such as Verbs (V) and Nouns (N).

In the work of Guglielmo Cinque from 1999 the cartographic method was used to create a detailed map of the structure of a clause. In this book Cinque proposes a “fixed universal hierarchy of clausal functional projections”.

In the literature it is assumed that adverbs are adjuncts in the syntactic structure, but he argues that treating the adverbs in this manner is problematic since adjuncts can take different positions which are not always grammatical. Therefore, he proposes adverbs are in fact “specifiers of distinct maximal projections”. Moreover, after a large cross linguistic analysis one of the observations was that adverbs from seemingly different classes have a fixed order across languages. Another observation was that the morpho-syntactically expressed functional heads also have a fixed hierarchy. When compared, the two hierarchies (namely, the hierarchy of adverbs (AdvPs) and that of functional heads) match for number, type and relative order.

1 a) Verb > Aspect completive > Aspect durative > Aspect retrospective > Aspect continuous > Aspect frequentative > Aspect habitual

  b) Verb > AdvP completive > AdvP durative > AdvP retrospective > AdvP continuous > AdvP frequentative > AdvP habitual

(Excerpt from Cinque 2012 representing the two proposed syntactic hierarchies in parallel (for the complete hierarchy please refer to the cited source). The hierarchy in 1a) is made up of functional heads (Mood, Tense, Modality, Aspect and Voice) while the hierarchy in 1b) is made up of Adverbs belonging to different classes.)

Examples from English

In the hierarchy from 1b the durative adverb class (briefly) is closer to the verb while the habitual class (normally) is farther away from it. Therefore, an inversed order of the adverbs would result in ungrammaticality, which is the case for example 2b.

durative > habitual

2 a) John can normally be briefly seen in his office on Mondays.
  b) *John can briefly be normally seen in his office on Mondays.

The hierarchy is also visible in the examples from 3

completive > frequentative

3 a) John frequently completely forgets his duties.
  b) *John completely frequently forgets his duties.

Examples from other languages

Italian

retrospective > continuous

4 a) Ogniqualvolta lo incontro, Gianni è sempre appena tornato dall’estero

     Whenever him (I) meet, Gianni is always just returned from abroad

  b) *Ogniqualvolta lo incontro, Gianni è appena sempre tornato dall’estero

     Whenever him (I) meet, Gianni is just always returned from abroad

Hebrew

retrospective > continuous

5 a)  Kše-‘ani pogeš ‘oto, John tamid bidiuk xozer me-kul

      When (I) meet him, John always just returns from abroad

  b) *Kše-‘ani pogeš ‘oto, John bidiuk tamid xozer me-kul

      When (I) meet him, John just always returns from abroad

Another influential discovery that has helped in shaping the properties of the cartographic model was the Principles and parameters model introduced by Noam Chomsky. The model tackled the invariance and the variability of natural languages by stating that, while languages seem to exhibit a lot of variability at the surface level, abstracting at a smaller level can reveal “limits on possible variation”. This model has led to new research in previously understudied languages with new empirical claims.

The cartographic method is intended as a heuristic model which can lead to new empirical claims and generalizations. In the view of Cinque & Rizzi the cartographic method can be useful for comparative syntax studies but also in studying uniformity across languages through the patterns observed. In this sense it is said to be a research topic rather than a program because it provides a tool for structural analyses.

== Basic principles ==
The cartographic theory considers the Uniformity Principle proposed by Noam Chomsky:

“In the absence of compelling evidence to the contrary, assume languages to be uniform, with variety restricted to easily detectable properties of utterances.”

This approach considers languages uniform in structure. It is assumed that even though some languages express or encode grammatical features in a visible way while others do not, the underlying functional sequence would be the same. It is also assumed that variability in the order of the functional elements could be explained by movement operations triggered by other influences (for example information structure or scope).

With the assumption that there is a one-to-one relationship between a syntactic feature and a head, within a hierarchy of functional categories every morphosyntactic feature (covertly or overtly realized) belonging to a functional element would be assigned a head with a fixed order in the hierarchy.

Previous research has shown that the inventory of functional elements is very rich, counting almost 150 separate functional elements. While the position in the hierarchy of functional elements was relatively constant among some studied languages, it has been observed that for other the hierarchy did not hold. For example, in Cinque 1999 it has been shown that some functional categories such as NegP (Negation) and AgrP (Agreement) can have different positions.

The aim of Cartography is then the drawing of structural maps that express syntactic configurations. This is done by observing the properties of the functional elements and the way in which they interact with each other to form seemingly fixed functional hierarchies.

== Method ==
The basic method of Cartography is called 'transitivity method'. This method will be introduced by an abstract and then by means of a concrete English example. The starting point is an observation of two elements A and B and their relative ordering. Usually, languages prefer one order with two elements, in this case, for example, AB, but not *BA (the star indicates that an order is not well-formed). In other cases, BA is not ill-formed, but marked. This means, for example, that one element needs to be stressed and that it can only be used under certain circumstances. This is indicated by a number sign (i.e., #BA). Then, the relative order of other elements is explored, for example, the relative order of the elements B and C. Suppose the relative order of these elements would be BC, but not *CB. This predicts that the order AC should hold, but the order *CA should be ruled out. This can then be tested.

This can be illustrated by the concrete example of English adjective ordering restrictions. In English, evaluative adjectives, used by a speaker to express his/her subjective evaluation of a noun precede size adjectives:

6 a)  a great big man
  b)  #a big great man '''evaluation > size'''

Note that it is possible to say (1b), but this either requires a pause or stress. Thus, the neutral order is evaluation > size. Also note that this is not an order concerning the two adjectives great and big, but the whole class of evaluative (e.g., cute or awesome) and size adjectives (e.g., tiny or small). So far, the observation that evaluative adjectives precede size adjectives in English is simply an empirical observation and is theory-neutral.

Now, another class is tested. For example, color adjectives. Comparing color adjectives to size adjectives reveals the order size > color:

7 a)  a tiny yellow fish 
  b)  #a yellow tiny fish '''size > color'''

Combining these insights predicts the order evaluation > color. This can now be tested:

8 a)  a big blue house
  b)  #a blue big house '''evaluation > color'''

As the prediction indeed turns out to be on the right track we can conclude that the order should be:

evaluative adjectives > size adjectives > color adjectives

In fact, it is not only these three classes, but many others that also exhibit similar ordering restrictions not only in English, but in presumably all languages of the world. The question that emerges is how to theoretically account for these facts. In older versions of generative grammar, it was assumed that adjectives are adjuncts. However, an adjunct approach explicitly predicts that the order of the adjectives should be free which is against the empirical facts.

== Cartography of the clause ==
The idea of Cartography is now that such ordering restrictions are hard-wired into the syntactic structures of all languages and that all languages exhibit the same structure. This leads to the assumption of a richly articulated and fixed set of functional projections. This is not only true for adjectives, but also for the structure of whole clauses. Such orders can be made visible by comparing different languages although languages are, of course, different on the surface. However, while languages use different strategies to express syntactic categories (or may not even express them at all) the order is nevertheless visible. As an example, consider the categories epistemic modality which expresses a necessity or a possibility that is made by a speaker based on his/her knowledge, tense (which is a bit of an oversimplification here), ability, and an event description. These categories are expressed in English in exactly this order (and other orders will be ill-formed):

(9) ... because Paula [must]     [have] [been able] [to repair her bike].
                       epistemic  tense  ability     event

Comparing this order to German reveals that this language uses a reverse strategy, i.e., the order is exactly the same, but mirrored (note again, that it is not possible to change the order):

(10) ... weil    Paula [ihr Fahrrad reparieren] [gekonnt] [haben] [muss].
        because Paula  her bike    repair       can       have    must
                       event                    ability   tense   epistemic

Examples like these are taken to be evidence in favor of the idea that syntactic structures are fixed across languages although there may be surface variation due to the fact that languages may employ different strategies of expressing them (e.g., by concatenating them from right to left or from left to right).

== The left periphery of the clause ==
From the beginning of Cartography, the research of the left periphery of the clause, also called initial periphery was of particular interest. The structure of a syntactic clause is made of three layers. These layers are V-Projection (Verb) which includes the lexical content of the clause, an I-Projection (Inflectional) and a C-Projection (Complementizer) which connects to a matrix sentence or to discourse. The initial periphery refers to the C-Projection, C-system or CP (Complementizer Phrase). It has been proposed that the left periphery is a structurally rich domain “fine grained” with distinct syntactic positions

The study of the left periphery of the clause from a cartographic perspective initially focused on Italian. It has been observed that different types of complementizers have different orders when a Topic element is added. For example, the declarative complementizer “che” is acceptable in different dialects both in front and after the Topic element while the infinitival complementizer “di” is always after the Topic element.

11 a) Ho deciso che, la macchina, la comprerò quest’anno
      ‘I decided that, the car, I will buy it this year

   b) Ho deciso, la macchina, di comprarla quest’anno
      ‘I decided, the car, of to buy it this year’

The former corresponds to the “Force” while the latter corresponds to “Fin”. A “Force” feature selects for a declarative, interrogative or an exclamative sentence while the “Fin” feature according to Rizzi and Bocci “expresses the finite or non-finite character of the clause, agreeing in finiteness with the finite or non-finite morphology of the clause-internal predicate”. This observation led to the simple mapping of functional features from 3 and to the conclusion that the C-system has a complex structure since “che” and “di” occupy different slots in this domain.

(12) Force … Top … Fin …

Another feature that was considered in the analysis of Rizzi 1997 was Focus. In Romance languages the Focus position is usually at the left periphery of the clause. It has been shown that its position relative to Topic is still quite flexible, allowing for several Topic elements in an unrestricted order around Focus (with the appropriate context). The standard order can be seen in the mapping from 13b:

13 a) Credo che, al presidente, QUESTO, nella riunione di domani, gli dovreste dire
      ‘I believe that, to the president, THIS, in tomorrow’s meeting, you should say to him’

   b) [ Force [ Top* [ Foc [ Top* [ Fin [IP … ] ] ] ] ] ]

The interrogative element “se” has been shown to have a similarly flexible order around Top (it can both be preceded and followed by Top) but it must nevertheless be in a higher position than Foc as in the mapping from 14:

(14) che . . . Top . . . se . . . Foc . . . Top . . . di

An explanation for this is the fact that syntactic features delimit the C-system in layers. As such the Force feature represented by the complementizer “que” would belong to the upper part of the C-system, the Int element “se” to the middle part and the “di” complementizer to the lower part. This evidence is believed to strengthen the rich structure hypothesis of the C-system.
