= Caterina Rizzi =

Italian mechanical engineer

Caterina Rizzi is an Italian mechanical engineer whose research involves the use of computer models of people and of virtual prototypes to study the ergonomics of engineering design, with applications including industrial design, medical prosthesis, and fashion and clothing. She is a professor and head of the Department of Management, Information and Production Engineering at the University of Bergamo.

== Education and career ==
Rizzi received a laurea (at that time the Italian equivalent of a master's degree) in physics from the University of Milan in 1985. She worked as a researcher at the Polytechnic University of Milan from 1985 to 1987, and for the National Research Council (Italy) from 1987 to 1992.

In 1992, she took an associate professor position at the University of Naples Federico II. She moved in 1995 to the University of Parma, and in 2001 she took her present position as a full professor at the University of Bergamo. She has headed the Department of Management, Information and Production Engineering since 2014.

== Recognition ==
Rizzi was elected as an ASME Fellow in 2025.
