= Sarki =

Sarki may refer to:

- Sarki, a well-dwelling snake slain by the mythological prince Bayajidda
- Şarkı, a vocal genre in Ottoman classical music
- Sarki (ethnic group), a sub group of Khas community
- Sarki, Hausa title for a traditional ruler or chief
