= Mar Sarkis =

Mar Sarkis (English: Saint Sergius; Arabic: مار سركيس) alternatively known as Saint Sarkis Monastery, is the name used for several monasteries that are dedicated to Mar Sarkis and Bakhos:

== Armenia ==
- Saint Sarkis Monastery of Ushi, in Ush, Aragatsotn Province, Armenia

== Azerbaijan ==
- Saint Sarkis Monastery of Gag
- St. Sarkis Monastery (Ramis, Azerbaijan)

== Lebanon ==
- Mar Sarkis, Ehden
- Monastery of Mar Sarkis, now the Gibran Museum, Bsharri

== Syria ==
- Monastery of Mar Sarkis, Maaloula

== Turkey ==
- Little Hagia Sophia, Istanbul

== See also ==
- St. Sarkis Church (disambiguation), includes cathedrals
- Sarkis (disambiguation)
