= Compressor stall =

Gas turbine phenomenon

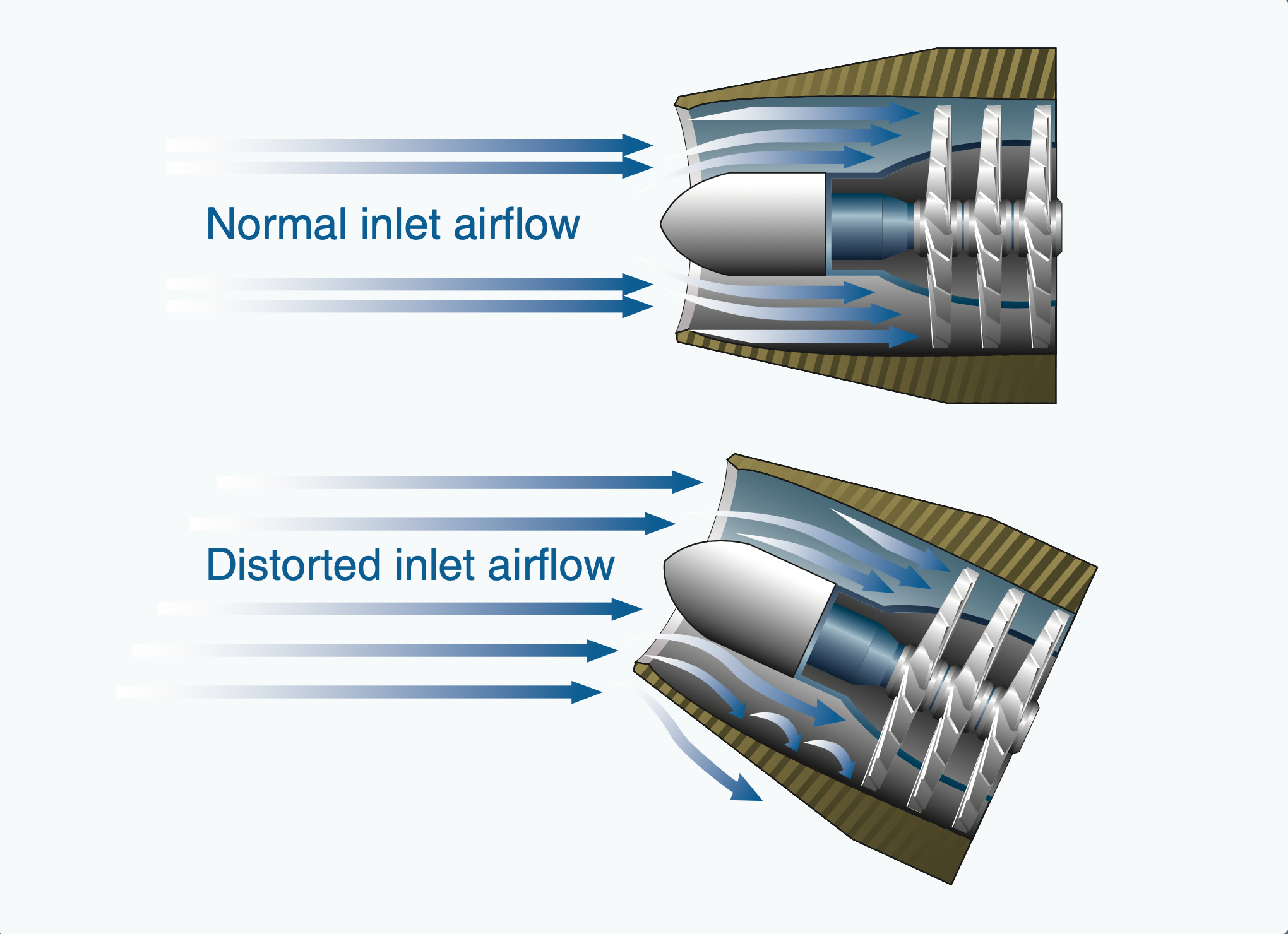
Comparison of normal and distorted airflow into the compressor section

A compressor stall is a local disruption of the airflow in the compressor of a gas turbine or turbocharger. A stall that results in the complete disruption of the airflow through the compressor is referred to as a compressor surge. The severity of the phenomenon ranges from a momentary power drop to a complete loss of compression.

Compressor stalls were a common problem on early jet engines with simple aerodynamics and manual or hydromechanical fuel control units, but they have been virtually eliminated by better design and the use of electronic control systems such as full authority digital engine control (FADEC). Modern compressors are carefully designed and controlled to avoid or limit stall within an engine's operating range.

== Types ==
An animation of an axial compressor showing both the stator blades and the rotor blades

There are two types of compressor stall, described below.

=== Rotating stall ===
A rotating stall is a local disruption of airflow within the compressor which continues to provide compressed air, but with reduced effectiveness. Rotating stall arises when a small proportion of airfoils experience flow separation, disrupting the local airflow without destabilizing the compressor. The stalled airfoils create pockets of relatively stagnant air (stall cells) which rotate about the circumference of the compressor, rather than moving in the flow direction. In part-span stall, the flow separation only occurs at the outermost portions of the blades, while in full-span stall, the flow has separated along the entire length of the blade.

The stall cells rotate with the rotor blades, but more slowly than the rotor blades; in part-span stall, the stall cells typically rotate at 50–70% of the rotor speed. In full-span stall, the stall cells are fewer in number than in part-span stall and rotate more slowly, typically at 20–40% of the rotor speed. The stall cells will affect subsequent airfoils around the rotor as each encounters the cell. Propagation of the instability around the flow path annulus is driven by stall cell blockage causing an incidence spike on the adjacent blade. The adjacent blade stalls as a result of the incidence spike, thus causing stall cell "rotation" around the rotor. Axially symmetric stalls cover the complete circumference of the compressor disc, but only a portion of its radial plane.

A rotating stall may be momentary, resulting from an external disturbance, or may be steady as the compressor reaches a working equilibrium between stalled and unstalled areas. Local stalls substantially reduce the efficiency of the compressor and increase the structural loads on the airfoils encountering stall cells. In many cases, the compressor airfoils are critically loaded without capacity to absorb the disturbance. In these cases, the original stall cells can rapidly expand to affect the entire compressor.

== Causes ==
A compressor will only pump air in a stable manner up to a certain pressure ratio. Beyond this value, the flow will break down and become unstable. This occurs at the surge line on a compressor map. A complete engine is designed to keep the compressor operating a small distance below the surge pressure. The distance between the operating pressure and the surge pressure is known as the surge margin. During engine operation, various factors can lower the surge pressure ratio or raise the operating pressure ratio. When the two coincide, there is no longer any surge margin and a compressor stage can stall or the complete compressor can surge.

=== Factors which erode compressor surge margin ===
The following, if severe enough, can cause stalling or surging.

- Ingestion of foreign objects which results in damage, as well as sand and dirt erosion, can lower the surge line.
- Dirt build-up in the compressor and wear that increases compressor tip clearances or seal leakages tend to raise the operating line.
- Complete loss of surge margin with violent surging can occur with a bird strike. When a bird is ingested by a compressor, the resulting blockage and airfoil damage cause compressor surging. Damage-causing debris on a runway or aircraft carrier flight deck can also be pieces of tire rubber, litter, nuts, bolts, and pieces dropped from other planes. Runways and aircraft carrier flight decks are cleaned frequently to prevent foreign-object ingestion.
- Aircraft operation outside its design envelope; e.g., extreme flight manoeuvres resulting in airflow separations within the engine intake, flight in icing conditions where ice can build up in the intake or compressor, or flight at excessive altitudes.
- Engine operation outside its flight manual procedures; e.g., on early jet engines, abrupt throttle movements (slam acceleration).
- In early jet engines, excessive over-fuelling. (Fuel control capability was extended to automatically limit the over-fuelling to prevent surging.)
- Turbulent or hot airflow into the engine intake, e.g., use of reverse thrust at low forward speed, resulting in re-ingestion of hot turbulent air or, for military aircraft, ingestion of hot exhaust gases from missile firing.
- Hot gases from gun firing which may produce inlet distortion; e.g., the Mikoyan MiG-27 and Fairchild Republic A-10 Thunderbolt II.

== Effects ==
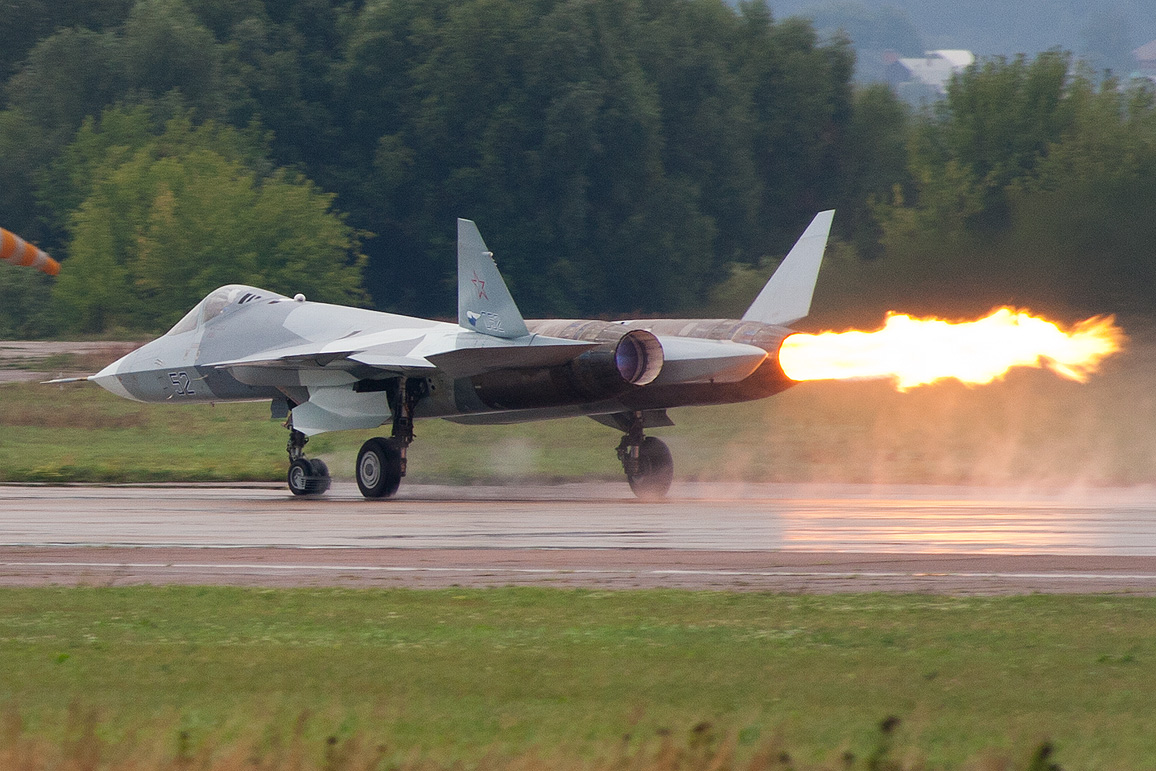
Sukhoi Su-57 prototype suffering a compressor stall at MAKS 2011

Compressor axially-symmetric stalls, or compressor surges, are immediately identifiable, because they produce one or more extremely loud bangs from the engine. Reports of jets of flame emanating from the engine are common during this type of compressor stall. These stalls may be accompanied by an increased exhaust gas temperature, an increase in rotor speed due to the large reduction in work done by the stalled compressor and — in the case of multi-engine aircraft — yawing in the direction of the affected engine due to the loss of thrust.

== Response and recovery ==
The appropriate response to compressor stalls varies according to the engine type and situation, but usually consists of immediately and steadily decreasing thrust on the affected engine. While modern engines with advanced control units can avoid many causes of stall, jet aircraft pilots must continue to take this into account when dropping airspeed or increasing throttle.

A compressor anti-stall system is a compressor bleed system that automatically dumps away unwanted air to prevent compressor stalling. Other methods of stall prevention may include an anti-stall tip treatment of the casing.

== Notable stall occurrences ==
=== Aircraft development ===
==== Rolls-Royce Avon engine ====
The Rolls-Royce Avon turbojet engine was affected by repeated compressor surges early in its 1940s development which proved difficult to eliminate from the design. Such was the perceived importance and urgency of the engine that Rolls-Royce licensed the compressor design of the Sapphire engine from Armstrong Siddeley to speed development. The engine, as redesigned, went on to power aircraft such as the English Electric Lightning fighter, English Electric Canberra bomber, and the de Havilland Comet and Sud Aviation Caravelle airliners.

==== Olympus 593 ====
During the 1960s development of the Concorde Supersonic Transport (SST) a major incident occurred when a compressor surge caused a structural failure in the intake. The hammershock that propagated forward from the compressor was of sufficient strength to cause an inlet ramp to become detached and expelled from the front of the intake. The ramp mechanism was strengthened and control laws changed to prevent a re-occurrence.

=== Aircraft crashes ===
==== U.S. Navy F-14 crash ====
A compressor stall contributed to the 1994 death of Lt. Kara Hultgreen, the first female carrier-based United States Navy fighter pilot. Her aircraft, a Grumman F-14 Tomcat, experienced a compressor stall and failure of its left engine, a Pratt & Whitney TF30 turbofan, due to disturbed airflow caused by Hultgreen's attempt to recover from an incorrect final approach position by executing a sideslip; compressor stalls from excessive yaw angle were a known deficiency of this type of engine.

==== Southern Airways Flight 242 ====
The 1977 loss of Southern Airways Flight 242, a McDonnell Douglas DC-9-9-31, while penetrating a thunderstorm cell over Georgia, was attributed to compressor stalls brought on by ingestion of large quantities of water and hail. The stalls caused blades to clash with stationary vanes in both of its Pratt & Whitney JT8D-9 turbofan engines. The stalls were so severe as to cause the destruction of the engines, leaving the flight crew with no choice but to make an emergency landing on a public road, killing 62 passengers and another eight people on the ground.

==== 1997 Irkutsk Antonov An-124 crash ====
On December 6, 1997, an Antonov 124 transport plane was destroyed when it crashed immediately after takeoff from Irkutsk-2 Airport in Russia. Three seconds after lifting off from Runway 14, at a height of about 5 metres (16 ft), the number 3 engine surged. Climbing away with a high angle of attack, engines 1 and 2 also surged, causing the aircraft to crash some 1,600 metres (5,200 ft) past the end of the runway. It struck several houses in a residential area, killing all 23 on board, and 45 people on the ground.

==== Trans World Airlines Flight 159 ====
On November 6, 1967, TWA Flight 159, a Boeing 707 on its takeoff roll from the then-named Greater Cincinnati Airport, passed Delta Air Lines Flight 379, a McDonnell Douglas DC-9 stuck in the dirt a few feet off the runway's edge. The first officer on the TWA aircraft heard a loud bang, now known to have been a compressor stall induced by ingestion of exhaust from Delta 379 as it was passed. Believing a collision had occurred, the copilot aborted the takeoff. Because of its speed, the aircraft overran the runway, injuring 11 of the 29 passengers, one of whom died four days later as a result of the injuries.

==== Scandinavian Airlines Flight 751 ====
In December 1991, Scandinavian Airlines System Flight 751, a McDonnell Douglas MD-81 on a flight from Stockholm to Copenhagen, crashed after losing both engines due to ice ingestion leading to compressor stall shortly after takeoff. Due to a newly installed auto-throttle system designed to prevent pilots from reducing power during the takeoff climb, the pilot's commands to reduce power on recognising the surge were countermanded by the system, leading to engine damage and total engine failure. The airliner successfully made a forced landing in a forest clearing without loss of life.

== See also ==
- Index of aviation articles
- Axial fan design
- Surge in compressors
