= Serj =

Serj (Armenian: Սերժ) is an Armenian given name. Serzh is an alternative Armenian form. Notable people with the name include:

- Serzh Sargsyan (born 1954), Armenian politician, former president of Armenia
- Serj Tankian (born 1967), Armenian-American musician, poet, and political activist

== See also ==
- Serge (name)
- Sargis
