= St. Sarkis Church (Tsovinar, Gegharkunik, Armenia) =

12th-century church building

Saint Sarkis Church Սուրբ Սարգիս եկեղեցի
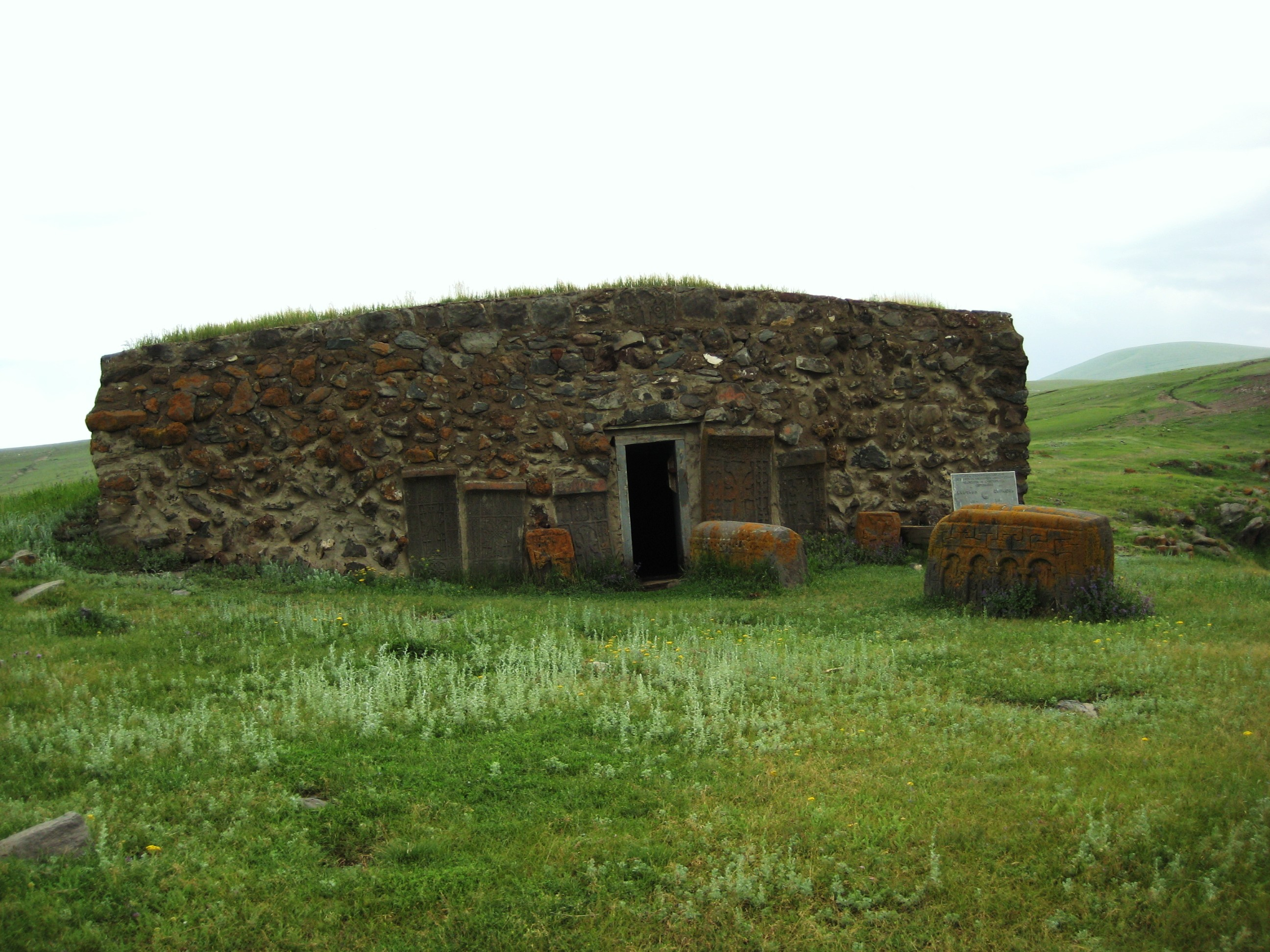
- Front façade of Saint Sarkis Church

- Location within Armenia

Religion
- Affiliation: Armenian Apostolic Church

Location
- Location: Tsovinar, Gegharkunik Province, Armenia
- Coordinates: 40.1406°N 45.5106°E

Architecture
- Type: Small single-aisle basilica
- Style: Armenian
- Completed: 12th to 13th centuries
- Dome: None

The small church of Saint Sarkis (Armenian: Սուրբ Սարգիս եկեղեցի; pronounced Surp Sarkis) is located in the foothills south of Lake Sevan in the Gegharkunik Province of Armenia. The structure was built between the 12th to 13th centuries and sits south of the village of Tsovinar on a promontory overlooking a small gorge. It has no dome, and a nearly flat roof covered in living grass. The church was allegedly "rebuilt" in the 20th century, but it is more likely that the roof and some of the stonework had just been repaired. Surrounding Surp Sarkis is a small cemetery of medieval graves, and just below the church in the ravine is a spring and cave.

== Gallery ==
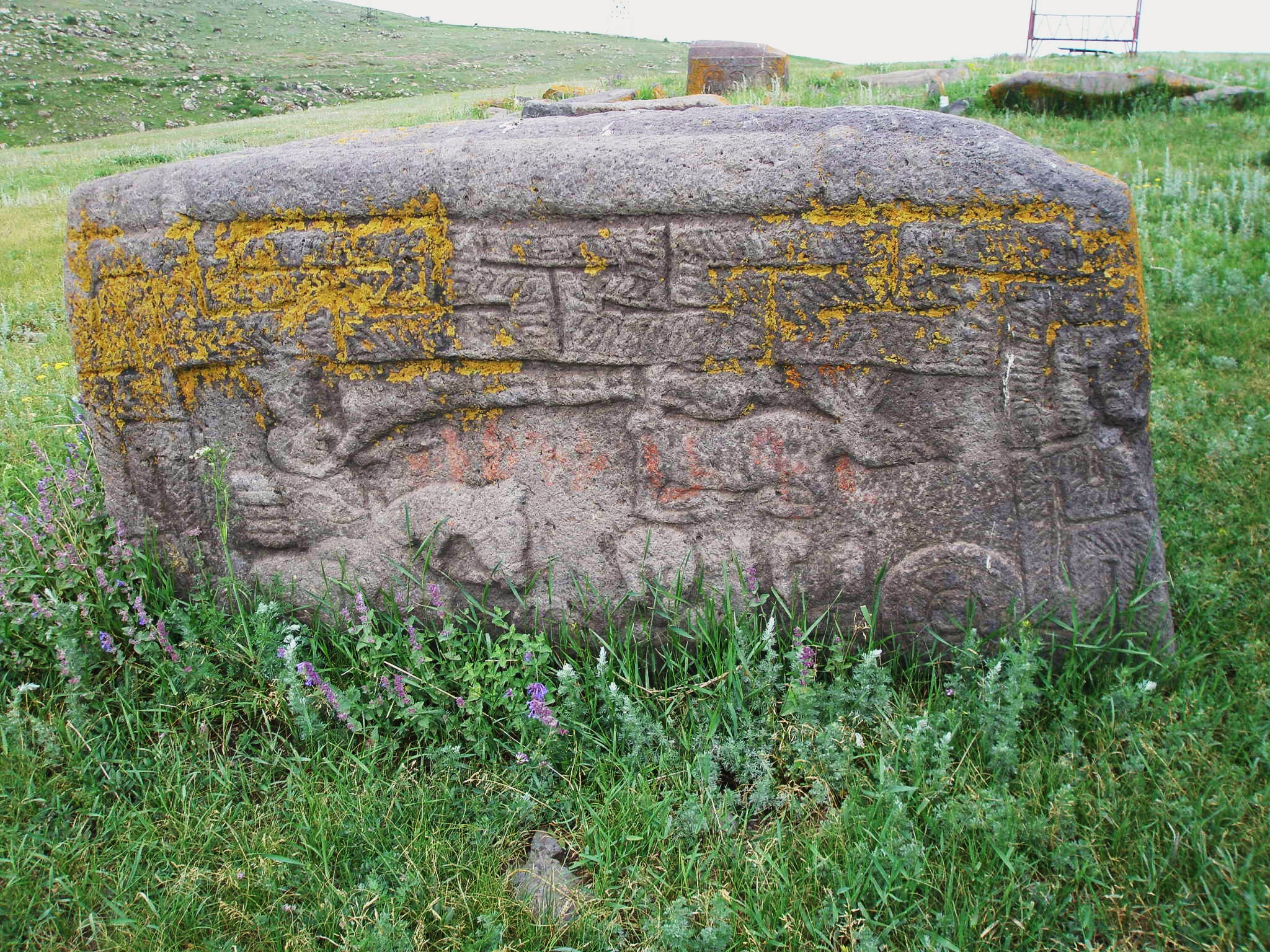
Medieval gravestone in front of the church
