= Surgery (disambiguation) =

Surgery is a medical specialty that uses operative treatment.

Surgery may also refer to:

== Medicine ==
- Operating theater, where surgery is performed, or the offices of the practitioner, the surgeon
- Doctor's surgery, British term for a doctor's office, a facility in which a general practitioner sees patients
- Surgery (journal), a medical journal

== Mathematics ==
- Surgery theory, a mathematical operation used in topology; two special cases are:
  - Dehn surgery
  - Hyperbolic Dehn surgery

== Arts, entertainment, and media ==
- Surgery (band), an American noise rock band
- The Surgery, a weekly radio show on BBC Radio 1
- Surgery (album), a 2005 album by The Warlocks
- "Surgery", a song by Robyn Hitchcock on his compilation album You & Oblivion
- "Surgery", a song by Jack Off Jill on their album Clear Hearts Grey Flowers
- "Surgery", a song by Two Door Cinema Club on their album Gameshow
- "Surgery" (short story), a short story by Anton Chekhov

== Other uses ==
- Surgery (politics), a series of one-to-one meetings that a political officeholder may have with his or her constituents
