= Surge in compressors =

Aerodynamic instability in axial or centrifugal compressors

Compressor surge is a form of aerodynamic instability in axial compressors or centrifugal compressors. The term describes violent air flow oscillating in the axial direction of a compressor, which indicates the axial component of fluid velocity varies periodically and may even become negative. In early literature, the phenomenon of compressor surge was identified by audible thumping and honking at frequencies as low as 1 Hertz, pressure pulsations throughout the machine, and severe mechanical vibration.

== Description ==
Compressor surge can be classified into deep surge and mild surge. Compressor surge with negative mass flow rates is considered as deep surge while the one without reverse flows is generally termed mild surge. On a performance map, the stable operating range of a compressor is limited by the surge line. Although the line is named after a surge, technically, it is an instability boundary which denotes onsets of discernible flow instabilities, such as compressor surge or rotating stall. When the mass flow rate drops to a critical value at which discernible flow instabilities take place, nominally, the critical value should be determined as a surge mass flow rate on a constant speed line; however, in practice, the surge line on a performance map is affected by specific criteria adopted for determining discernible flow instabilities.

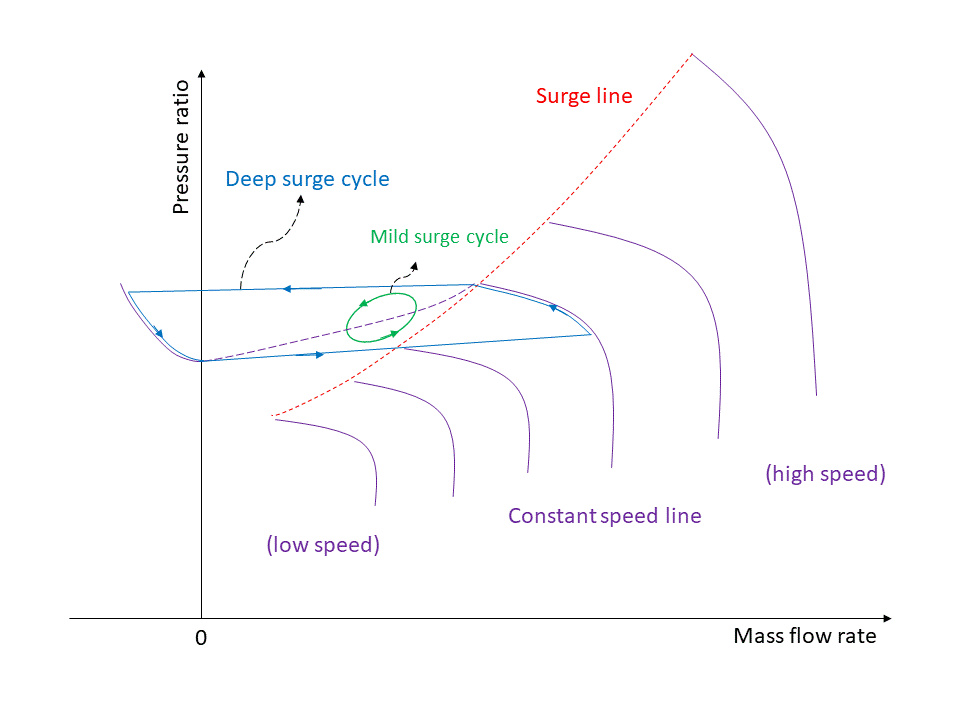
..A typical compressor performance map

== Effects ==
During a compressor surge, the operating point of the compressor, which is denoted by the mass flow rate and pressure ratio, orbits around a surge cycle on the compressor performance map. In addition to affecting performance, surging is also accompanied by loud noises. Surge cycle frequencies can range from a few to dozens of cycles per second depending on the configuration of the compression system. Although Helmholtz resonance frequency is often employed to characterize the unsteadiness of mild surge; it was found that Helmholtz oscillation did not trigger compressor surge in some cases. Violent changes in flow during compressor surging cause compressor blades to flex, resulting in fatigue damage or failure. While fully developed compressor surge is axisymmetric, its initial phase is not necessarily so. Severe damage from compressor surging is often related to very large transverse loads on blades and related casing loads in its initial stage.

== Causes ==
In most low-speed and low-pressure cases, rotating stall comes prior to compressor surge; however, a general cause-effect relation between rotating stall and compressor surge has not been determined yet. On a constant speed line of a compressor, the mass flow rate decreases as the pressure delivered by the compressor gets higher. Internal flows of the compressor are in a very large adverse pressure gradient which tends to destabilize the flow and cause flow separation. A fully developed compressor surge can be modeled as a one-dimensional global instability of a compression system which typically consists of inlet ducts, compressors, exit ducts, gas reservoir, and throttle valve. A cycle of compressor surge can be divided into several phases. If the throttle valve is turned to be a very small opening, the gas reservoir would have a positive net flux. The pressure in the reservoir keeps increasing and then exceeds the pressure at compressor exit, thus resulting in an adverse pressure gradient in exit ducts. This adverse pressure gradient naturally decelerates flows in the whole system and reduces the mass flow rate. The slope of a constant speed line near surge line is usually zero or even positive, which implies that the compressor cannot provide a much higher pressure as lowering the mass flow rate. Thus, the adverse pressure gradient could not be suppressed by the compressor and the system would rapidly involve an overshoot of adverse pressure gradient which would dramatically reduce the mass flow rate or even cause flows to reverse. On the other hand, the pressure in the reservoir would gradually drop due to less flux delivered by the compressor, thus rebuilding a favorable pressure gradient in exit ducts. And then the mass flow rate would be recovered, and the compressor is back to work on a constant speed line again, which would eventually trigger the next surge cycle. Therefore, compressor surge is a process which keeps breaking the flow path of a compression system down and rebuilding it. Several rules of thumb can be inferred from the interpretation above. Compressor surge in a system with a small gas reservoir is high-frequency and low-amplitude whereas a large gas reservoir leads to low-frequency and high-amplitude compressor surge; another rule of thumb is that compressor surge happens in a compressor with a large external volume and compressor stall tends to show up in a system with a short exit duct. It is also worth noting that the surge line of a compressor can have small variations in different systems, such as a test bench or an engine.

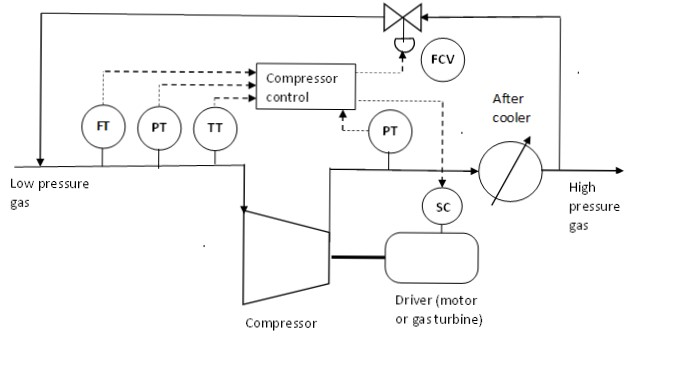
Schematic of compressor control instrumentation

=== Preventing surge ===
In the oil and gas industry the operation of gas compressors in surge conditions is prevented by instrumentation around the compressor. The measured flow rate of gas (FT) in the compressor suction line together with the suction pressure (PT), and sometimes the suction temperature (TT) and the pressure (PT) in discharge line is fed into the surge controller. Algorithms in the controller use the data to establish the performance of the machine; the data identifies the operating point in terms of the flow and the developed head. When the compressor’s operation approaches the surge point the controller modulates either a flow control valve (FCV) in the recycle line or adjusts the speed (SC) of the compressor driver. The FCV allows cooled gas from the discharge to spill back to the suction of the compressor, thereby maintaining the forward flow of gas through the machine. The recycle line is ideally located to take cooled gas from downstream of the compressor after-cooler and to discharge it into the feed to the compressor suction drum.

== See also ==
- Compressor stall
