= Hygerta Sako =

Albanian sports journalist and model

- Born: Hygerta Sako; Durrës, Albania
- Occupations: journalist, tv presenter, former model
- Height: 5 ft 11 in (1.80 m)
- Beauty pageant titleholder
- Title: Miss Albania 1995
- Hair color: Brown
- Eye color: Brown
- Major competition: Miss Europe 1996

Hygerta Sako is an Albanian sports journalist at RTSH, television presenter and former model who won Miss Albania in 1995, and represented Albania at Miss Europe 1996 where she placed among the semifinalists.
