= Odzaberd =

Archaeological site in Armenia

- Oձաբերդ (Armenian); Teisheba (Urartian)
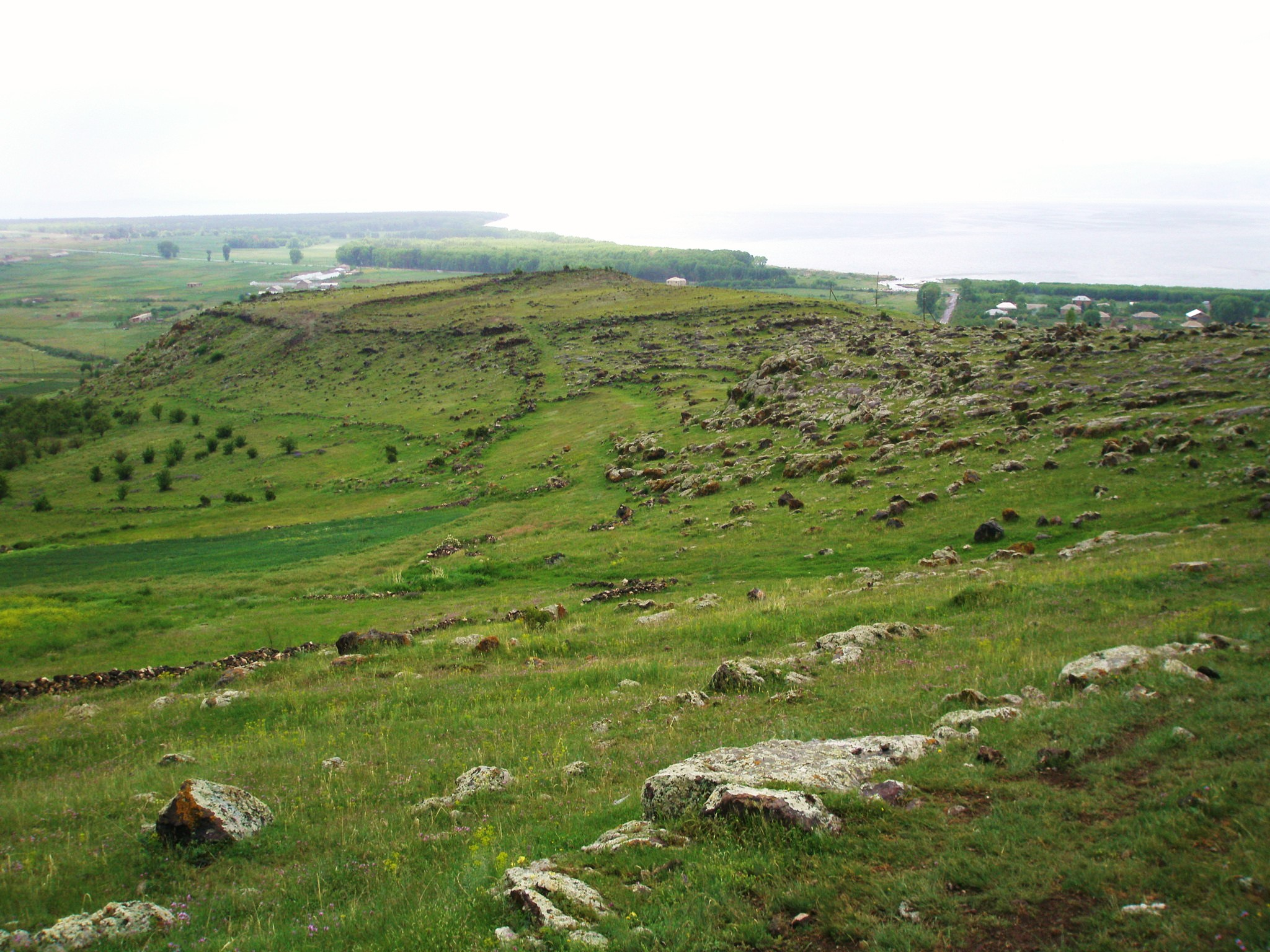
- The ruins of Odzaberd overlooking Lake Sevan

- Location within Armenia
- 40.1528°N 45.4950°E
- Location: Gegharkunik Province, Armenia
- Nearest city: Tsovinar

History
- Founded: 8th century BCE
- Founder: Rusa I of Urartu
- Original use: Fortification

Odzaberd (Armenian: Oձաբերդ) was an ancient settlement in modern Armenia on the shore of Lake Sevan. It was founded in the 8th century BCE by a ruler of Urartu, an Iron Age kingdom centered in the Armenian Highlands, and continuously occupied into the Middle Ages. The site is organized into three distinct zones: a central citadel, a fortress, and an extensive outer town. Archaeologists undertook excavations at the site in 2016 and 2017.

Archaeological excavations revealed occupation from the 8th century BCE through the Medieval Armenian period. A stele on the site bears an Urartian-language cuneiform inscription which states that Odzaberd was established by the Urartian king Rusa I (r. 735–714 BCE) in honor of the weather god Theispas to "demonstrate the power of Biaina [the Urartian capital, modern Van] and to cow her enemies." Some sources refer to the site as "Teisheba" or other variations of the Urartian god's name.

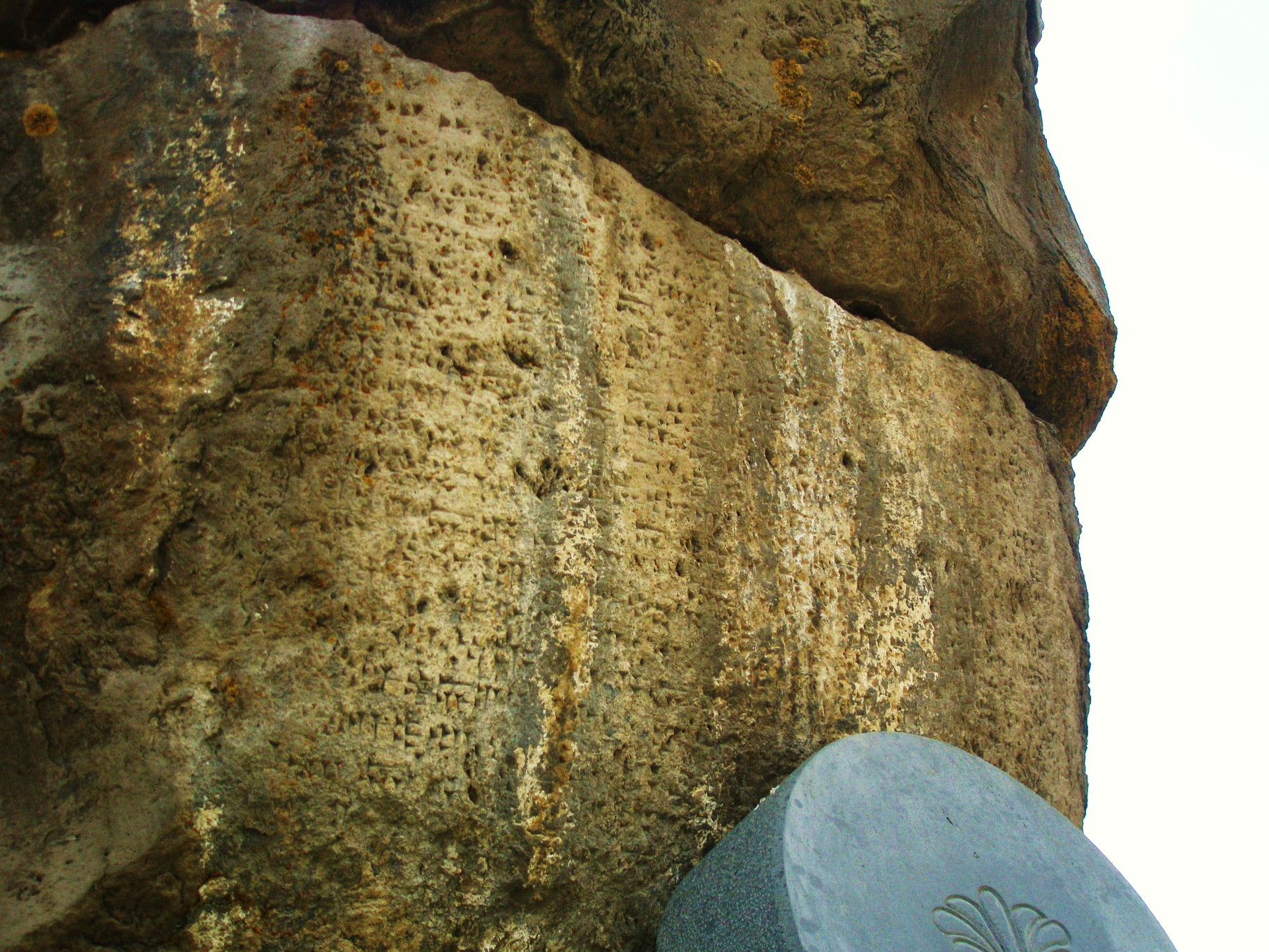
Cuneiform inscription at Odzaberd

Structures from the earliest period formed the foundations for later development across the site. In the post-Urartian period (late 7th–6th centuries BCE) Odzaberd was a regional center, as evidenced by recovered pottery styles and the use of mudbricks. Excavations in the eastern sectors of the fortress identified occupation layers that confirm use into the Middle Ages

The Odzaberd site is on the southern shore of Lake Sevan near the town of Tsovinar.

== See also ==
- Erebuni Fortress
- Teishebaini
