= Luigi Rizzi (footballer) =

Italian footballer (born 1907)

Personal information
- Date of birth: 11 June 1907
- Place of birth: Milan, Italy
- Position: Midfielder

Senior career*
Years	Team	Apps	(Gls)
1926–1928	Milanese	34	(?)
1928–1933	Ambrosiana-Inter	2	(0)
1936–1937	Parma	9	(1)
1938–1940	Lecco	19	(6)
- * Club domestic league appearances and goals

Luigi Rizzi (born 11 June 1907 in Milan) was an Italian professional football player.

== Honours ==
- Serie A champion: 1929/30
