= Sarkis Rizzi =

Head of the Maronite Church from 1581 to 1597

Sarkis Rizzi, or Sarkis el-Rizzi (in Arabic:سركيس الرزي, in Latin: Sergius Risius, born in 1572 in Bkoufa, Lebanon - died in June 1638 in Rome) was a Lebanese Maronite bishop. On his initiative, he was the first clergyman to print of a book in an Arab country.

== Biography ==
Sarkis Rizzi's family presented at this time three patriarchs to the Maronite Church: his two uncles Michel (1567 - 1581) and of the same name Sarkis (1581 - 1596) and his younger brother Joseph (October 3, 1596 - March 26, 1608). Youssef was abbot of the Monastery of Qozhaya in the Kadisha Valley after the election of his uncle Sarkis patriarch and was in 1595 appointed bishop.

The young Sarkis belonged in 1584 to the first group of students at the Pontifical Maronite College in Rome. Rizzi was in Rome when was ordained deacon and priest, and after that he returned to Lebanon in 1596. In September–October of this year he was at the Second Synod of Qannoubine. The Synod was passed through the papal legate Jerome Dandini. In this Synod, his brother Youssef was elected patriarch. He then took over his post as head of the Monastery of Qozhaya. In 1600 Rizzi was consecrated bishop by his brother (as Metropolitan of Damascus), but remained in the monastery.

In 1606 he was sent by the patriarch to Rome as head of a delegation to the new Pope Paul V to give him his congratulations. He left Tripoli in October 1606 and reached Rome on 19 April 1607. Patriarch Youssef died on March 26, 1608. Due to difficulties that the Ottoman authorities made, the election of his successor John VIII Machlouf not take place before the beginning of 1609. The new Patriarch actually even had some time after Chouf flee. Rizzi then returned to Lebanon. Sometime between 1609-1610 he arrived there. But the new Patriarch initiated a policy of reaction against the family Rizzi, who had 40 years exercised the power in the Church. The monastery of Qozhaya was also returned to the bishop and Youssef Rizzi excommunicated.

Sarkis Rizzi returned then finally to Rome, which he reached sometime before 1621. There he worked on many out lative projects: The issue of the Maronite Breviariums in 1624, the pressure of the Syrian grammar of Abraham Ecchellensis in 1628, and the Thesaurus of the Franciscan Orientalists Tommaso Obizzino (Tommaso da Novaria) in 1636. He also worked on the project of Arabic Bible whose completion should continue until 1671.

== The Psalter of Quzhaya ==
His name is particularly associated with the publication of the Psalter of Qozhaya, an edition of the Psalms in Syriac and Garschuni (Arabic written in the Syriac alphabet). This was the first book printed in Lebanon and the entire region of the Levant. This pressure remained the only one for almost a century.

Previously, the only printed books that were in circulation in Lebanon were the catechisms in Garschuni and the Arabic version of the Professio fidei Tridentina which were also drafted in Garschuni. The Jesuit Giovanni Battista Eliano had brought them from Rome in 1580. Another book with Maronite prayers had been printed in 1584 in Rome and in the following years created more prints in various Italian cities.

The Psalter of Quzhaya comprises 268 pages (without numbering eight, then 260 pages numbering in Syrian letters). The headers of the pages bear in red the Syrian tracks Ktobo d-mazmuré (Book of Psalms). There are 150 psalms and a canonical apocryphal, which obviously comes from the Syriac tradition, four biblical canticles and another of Ephrem the Syrian (only in Syriac). The texts are arranged on the sides in two columns, left and right in Syriac Garschuni. Since the Arabic text is longer, the characters have different sizes to obtain the parallelism. On the first page there is the signature of Sarkis (Sergius Risius Archiepiscopus Damascenus) with its coat of arms and the following information: "The revered hermitage of the Sacred Valley of Qozhaya in Mount Lebanon, work of the master Pasquale Eli and low Youssef ibn Amimeh de Karmsaddé called deacon, in 1610, of the Lord." On the third page, the preface to the reader finds, written in Garschuni of Sarkis Rizzi. On page 258 is the imprimatur by the Bishop of Zgharta, Girgis Ibn Amira (probably in revenge no mention of Patriarch John Makhlouf). The last two pages are taken from the colophon, which is written in the first person of Deacon Youssef ibn Amimeh, who explains that he is through his mother the nephew of the initiator Sarkis Rizzi. He wishes to thank all employees of the company. The date of signature is precise: November 10, 1610.

Sarkis was a master printer coming from Italy, and Pasquale Eli from Camerino who guided the work. But it is not known whether the Bishop during this year stayed even in Lebanon, or whether he was in Rome, and his nephew alone ran the company. Unknown is also the origin of the print types (two types in different sizes): they were also brought from Italy, or produced locally? They are known from no other issue. The filigree design speaks for the production in Italy.

The issue has long been little known. Gabriel Sionita asserts (Syrian-Latin, Paris, 1625) in his preface to his bilingual Psalter that he had manufactured the first printed edition of this text in Syriac. The patriarch Estephan El Douaihy (1630-1704) mentioned the work in any of his numerous writings on the community and culture of the Maronites (dans ses nombreux écrits sur la communauté et la culture Maronites, ne jamais la mentionne). However, it is certain that this pressure has taken place in 1610. In the example that in the Nuremberg Municipal Library has been preserved in 1611 two piastres that were acquired by the Bishop of Zgharta by the scholar German Tobias Adami.Leo Allatius invokes in his Apes urbanae, sive de viris illustribus (Rome, 1633) on Sarkis Rizzi and confirms the issue. However, the first bibliography, which mentions the issue is the Bibliotheca Sacra of Jacques Lelong in 1709.

Also known are a few examples: one each in the Bibliothèque nationale de France (A-495); in the Sainte-Geneviève Library (Fol A58 Inv 62 Res.); at the Nuremberg Library (Ms. Solg 21. 2); in the Herzog August Library in Wolfenbüttel (Bible-S 4 ° 227th); in Lebanon in the Bibliothèque orientale the Saint Joseph University (USJ-BO 26C2) and in the Bibliothèque centrale of the Holy Spirit University of Kaslik, Kaslik (USEK Pat. 291).

== Heritage ==
There is no information on the whereabouts of the printing materials after production of the book. There was another attempt to set up a printing works in Lebanon (1627) and apparently was also the one that had been set up in Monastery of Qozhaya has already been lost. When the OLM's building was given back in 1708, there were no furnishings more and a printing house was set up again only at the beginning of the 19th century. After the one-time preparation of the printing of psalter in Quzhaya was only at the end of the 18th century into the Levant that was introduced again by the Melkite Patriarch Athanasius IV (1720-1724): he acquired a printing press from Bucharest and established in 1704 a printing house in Aleppo; some issues of biblical and liturgical texts appeared there from 1706 to 1711, before even this activity was canceled again. Only in 1733 was built permanently by a Melkite deacon, Abdallah Zakher, a print shop in the monastery of Dhour El Choueir.

== Works ==
- Bible arabe, Ancien et Nouveau Testament, January 1, 1671 Soc. bibl. brit. et ETR.
- Kitaab al-'ahd al-Jadīd, ya'na, Injeel al-li-Rabbina Muqqas Yesū' al-Masih, Sergius Risius, January 1, 1850 wilyam WATS-Verlag.

== Bibliography ==
- Johann Christian Döderlein: Repertory of Biblical and Oriental literature, Part 3-4. Weidmann's heirs and Reich, 1778 S. 84.
- Johann Heinrich Zedler, Carl Günther Ludovici: Large complete Universallexikon all arts and sciences, Volume 37: Mail Si. Hall from 1706 to 1751, Sp 374.
- Johann Salomo Semler: attempt a fruitful statement of church history of the 17th century, First section, Volume 3, Hemmerde 1778, p. 141.
- PB Dirksen: The transmission of the text in the Peshitta manuscript of the Book of Judges, Brill, Leiden 1972, p 15.
- Joseph Moukarzel: Le psautier syriaque-garchouni Edite à Qozhaya en 1610. Enjeux historiques et présentation du livre. In: Mélanges de l'Université Saint-Joseph, Volume 63, 2010-2011, pp 511-566.
- Joseph Nasrallah: L'Imprimerie au Liban Imprimerie de Saint-Paul, Harissa (Liban), 1949.
