= Luigi Rizzi (linguist) =

Italian linguist

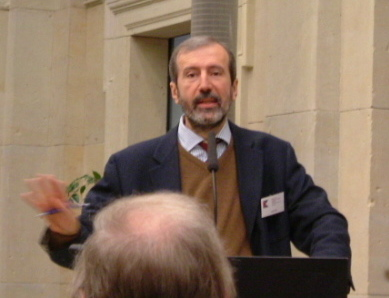
Rizzi in Berlin, 2005

Luigi Rizzi (born 3 June 1952 in Genoa) is an Italian linguist.

Rizzi is currently a full professor at the University of Siena in Italy. He studied at the Scuola Normale Superiore, the University of Pisa and the University of Paris VIII. Before moving to Siena, Rizzi was a full professor at the University of Geneva.

Rizzi is co-director of the journal Rivista di grammatica generativa. His research is mainly concerned with the theory of syntax and language acquisition, and he has made a notable contribution to the theory of locality, parametric comparative syntax and the cartography of syntactic structures.

== Selected bibliography ==
- Issues in Italian Syntax (1982). Dordrecht: Foris.
- Relativized Minimality (1990). Cambridge, MA: MIT Press.
- The Structure of CP and IP: The Cartography of Syntactic Structures, Vol. 2 (ed.) (2004). Oxford: OUP.
