= List of current ambassadors of Burkina Faso =

The Burkinabe ambassador is the official representative of the Government in Ouagadougou to a government or a subject of International law.

== List of representatives ==
| State | Diplomatic accreditation | Ambassador | Observations | Coaccreditation | List | ref. |
|---|---|---|---|---|---|---|
| South Africa | March 6, 2014 | Salimata Sawadogo | | Maseru (Lesotho), March 6, 2014: Victoria, Seychelles (Seychelles) | | |
| Algeria | May 24, 2017 | Dominique Diendéré | Brother of Gilbert Diendéré | | | |
| Ivory Coast | | | poste non pourvu | | | |
| Egypt | October 27, 2013 | Henri Gnama Bacye | | Cairo, April 30, 2015: Tel Aviv | | |
| Ethiopia | | | poste non pourvu | | | |
| Ghana | September 18, 2014 | Clémence Traoré/Somé | | | | |
| Libya | October 3, 2013 | Abrahám Traore | général de brigade | July 30, 2014: Lomé (Togo) | | |
| Mali | January 31, 2014 | Kodjo Lougue | | | List | |
| Morocco | | | poste non pourvu | | | |
| Nigeria | March 6, 2014 | Piabié Firmin Grégoire N'DO | | Yaoundé, (Cameroon), (Equatorial Guinea) (Gabon), (Sao Tome and Principe) and Abuja (Economic Community of West African States). | | |
| Senegal | October 29, 2013 | Aline Koala Kaboré | 2006: Salimata Sawadogo | Dakar, Nouakchott (Mauritania), (Guinea), (Cape Verde), and (Gambia). | | |
| Chad | May 14, 2014 | Ambroise Silga | (*1955) | | | |
| Tunisia | | | poste non pourvu | | | |
| Brazil | November 16, 2017 | Alain Francis Gustave Ilboudo | | | | |
| Canada | June 25, 2012 | Adrien Koné | | | | |
| Cuba | May 2012 | Daniel Ouédraogo | poste non pourvu | May 3, 2012: Nicaragua, Honduras, Jamaica, Guatemala, Haiti, El Salvador, July 3, 2013: Costa Rica, Belize, Panama, Dominican Republic | | |
| United States | August 8, 2016 | Alpha Barry | poste non pourvu | | List | |
| United Nations | December 21, 2015 | Yemdaogo Eric Tiare | poste non pourvu | | | |
| Saudi Arabia | December 5, 2012 | Mansa Ountana | | | | |
| China | May 20, 2016 | Céline Yoda | poste non pourvu | | List China | |
| India | | | poste non pourvu | | | |
| Japan | January 10, 2013 | François Oubida | | Manila (Philippines) | | |
| Germany | November 10, 2015 | Simplice Honore Guibila | | June 8, 2017: Tallinn (Estonia) Kyiv (Ukraine), Warsaw (Poland) Minsk (Belarus) | List | |
| Austria | October 4, 2016 | Dieudonné Kéré | | concurrently accredited in March 2018: Belgrade (Serbia) Zagreb (Croatia), Budapest (Hungary), Prague (Czech Republic), Bratislava (Slovakia), Ljubljana (Slovenia), (United Nations Office at Vienna) | List | |
| Belgium | December 10, 2016 | Jacqueline Marie Zaba Nikiema | | Ambassador to the Court of St James's, Netherlands, Luxembourg and Ireland representative to the Organisation for the Prohibition of Chemical Weapons. | List | |
| Switzerland | | | poste non pourvu | | | |
| Russia | July 7, 2014 | Antoine Somdah | poste non pourvu | April 4, 2018 Mongolia | List | |
| Denmark | October 20, 2017 | Maria-Goretti Blandine Agaleoue Adoua | | Nordic and Baltic countries | List | |
| France | May 8, 2013 | Éric Yemdaogo Tiaré | Tiaré remplace Paré | January 28, 2014: UNESCO and to the Holy See. | List | |
| Italy | December 29, 2011 | Raymond Balima, February 13, 2017: Joséphine Ouédraogo | | February 13, 2017: Tirana (Albania), Sofia (Bulgaria), (Bosnia and Herzegovina), (Cyprus), Athenes (Greece), Bucharest (Romania) and the Sovereign Military Order of Malta. | | |

== See also ==
- List of ambassadors to Burkina Faso
