= Burkina Faso–Iran relations =

- Burkina Faso: Iran

Burkina Faso–Iran relations are bilateral relations between Burkina Faso and Iran. The two countries enjoy strong and friendly bilateral relations. Burkina Faso has an embassy in Tehran and Iran has an embassy in Ouagadougou.

== Development cooperation ==
In March 2023, Iran donated 200,000 doses of COVID-19 vaccines to Burkina Faso.

== Official visits ==
| Guest | Host | Place of visit | Date of visit |
|---|---|---|---|
| (Burkina Faso) Minister of Foreign Affairs Olivia Rouamba | (Iran) President Ebrahim Raisi | Tehran | September 4, 2023 |
| (Burkina Faso) Minister of Foreign Affairs Olivia Rouamba | (Iran) Foreign Minister Hossein Amir-Abdollahian | Tehran | September 4, 2023 |
| (Burkina Faso) Minister of Foreign Affairs Olivia Rouamba | (Iran) Minister of Oil Javad Owji | Tehran | September 4, 2023 |
| (Burkina Faso) Minister of Foreign Affairs Olivia Rouamba | (Iran) Minister of Cooperatives, Labour and Social Welfare Sowlat Mortazavi | Tehran | September 4, 2023 |
| (Burkina Faso) Secretary General of the Foreign Ministry Issa Boro | Ministry of Foreign Affairs of Iran Ali Bagheri | Tehran | June 18, 2023 |
| Health Minister of Burkina Faso Robert Kargougou | (Iran) Minister of Health and Medical Education Bahram Eynollahi | Tehran | March 13, 2023 |

== See also ==
- Foreign relations of Burkina Faso
- Foreign relations of Iran
