= Timeline of Ouagadougou =

The following is a timeline of the history of the city of Ouagadougou, Burkina Faso.

== Pre-19th century ==
- 11-12th centuries - founding of Wagadugu by Soninke Wangara merchants.
- 14th century - conquest of Wagadugu by the Mossi people. According to legend, they were led by Oubri, a grandson of Ouedraogo.
- 15th century - founding of the Wagadugu Kingdom
- c. 1495 - Wagadugu assumes an important position among the Mossi States.

== 19th century ==
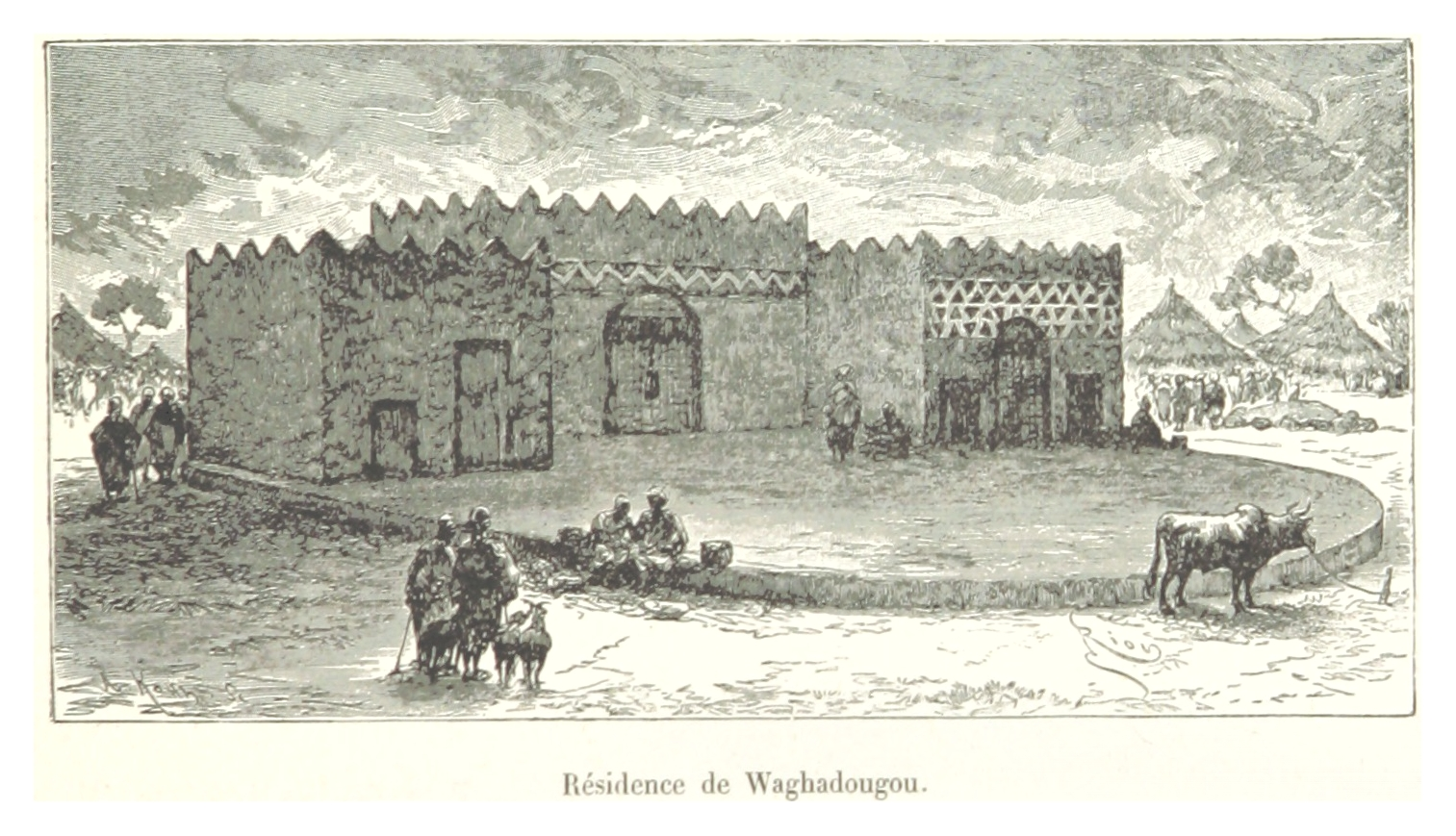
Residence in Ouagadougou in 1892

- early 19th century - Moro-Naba Doulougou converts to Islam, builds the first mosque in Ouagadougou.
- 24 September 1886 - Gottlob Adolf Krause becomes the first known European to visit Ouagadougou.
- 5 September 1896 - Ouagadougou taken by French forces; city burned.

== 20th century ==
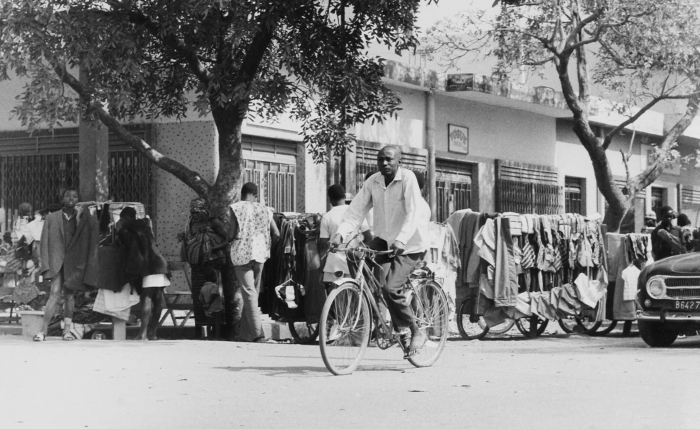
View of Ouagadougou, 1970s

- 1904 - Population: 4,000 (estimate).
- 1919 - Ouagadougou designated capital of French colonial Upper Volta. Lt. Governor Edouard Hesling begins a large building program.
- 1920 - Population: 19,332.
- 1921 - Catholic Apostolic Vicariate of Ouagadougou established.
- 1932 - Upper Volta becomes part of Côte d'Ivoire; capital moves from Ouagadougou.
- 1936 - Ouagadougou Cathedral built.
- December 1954 - Railway link to Abidjan opens. Population begins to grow rapidly.
- 1955
  - Abidjan-Ouagadougou railway begins operating.
  - Étoile Filante de Ouagadougou (football club) formed.
- 1956 - Joseph Ouédraogo becomes mayor.
- 1960 - City becomes capital of independent Burkina Faso.
- 1961
  - Population: 59,126.
  - Joseph Conombo becomes mayor.
- 1966 - Population: 77,500 (estimate).
- 1969 - Panafrican Film and Television Festival of Ouagadougou begins.
- 1972 - Koupéla-Ouagadougou road built.
- 1974 - University of Ouagadougou founded.
- 1977 - Santos FC (football club) formed.
- 1982 - Boromo-Ouagadougou road built.
- 1983 - Population: 307,937 (estimate).
- 1984 - Stade du 4 Août (stadium) opens.
- 1986 - Bobo-Dioulasso-Ouagadougou road built.
- 1990 - AS SONABEL (football club) formed.
- 1991
  - Le Pays newspaper begins publication.
  - Population: 634,479 (estimate).
- 1995 - Simon Compaoré becomes mayor.
- 1996
  - Radio Salankoloto begins broadcasting.
  - Population: 709,736.
- 1998 - 28 February: 1998 African Cup of Nations Final football contest played in Ouagadougou.

== 21st century ==
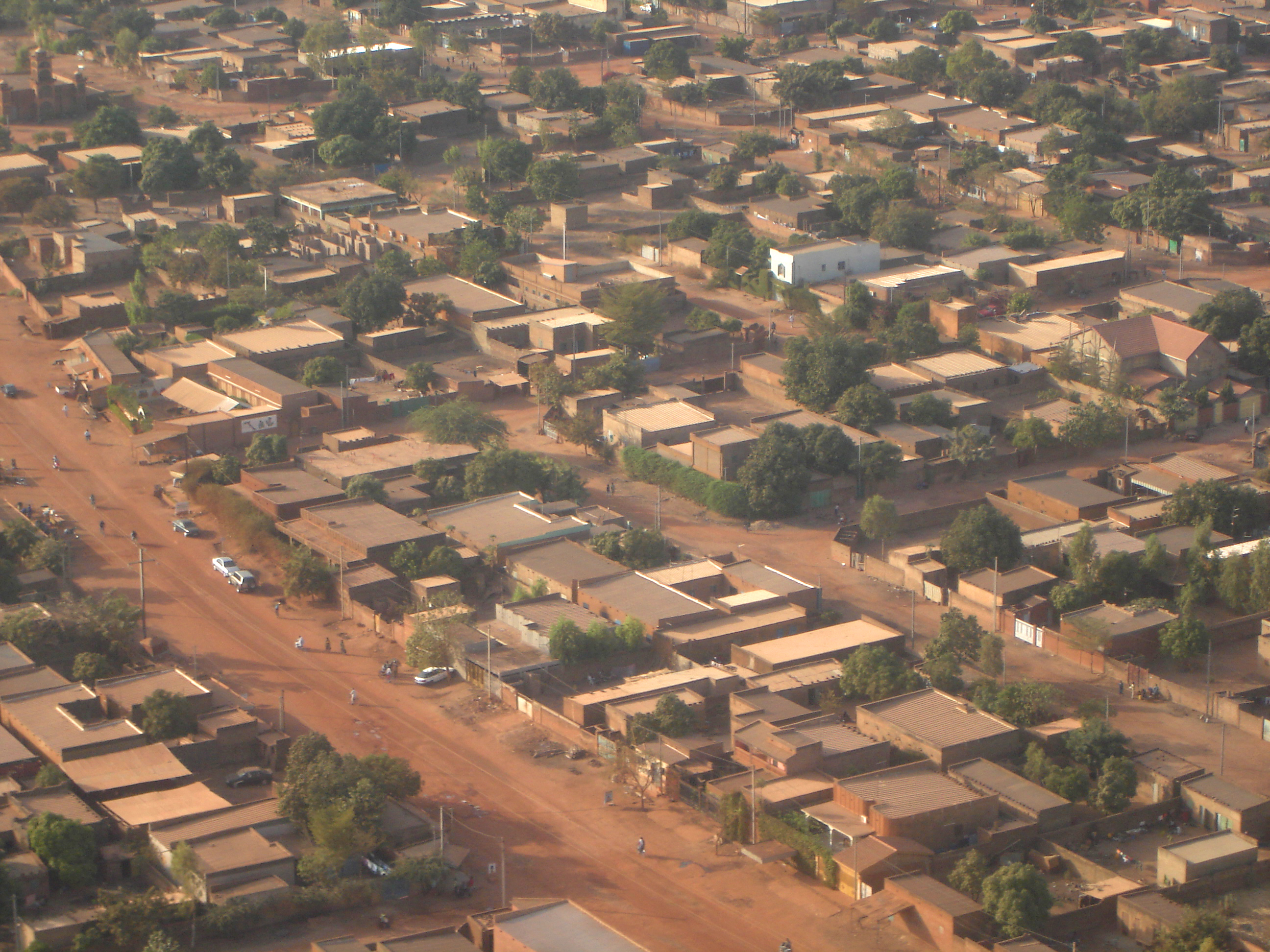
Aerial view of Ouagadougou, 2007

- 2004
  - November: Meeting of the Organisation internationale de la Francophonie held in city.
  - Meeting of the Association Internationale des Maires Francophones held in city.
- 2006 - Population: 1,475,223.
- 2007
  - August: 2007 African Junior Athletics Championships held in city.
  - United States military drone base established at airport.
- 2014 - October–November: 2014 Burkinabé uprising.
- 2016
  - 15 January: 2016 Ouagadougou attacks by militant Islamists occur.
  - Armand Béouindé becomes mayor.
- 2017 - 13 August: 2017 Ouagadougou attack.
- 2019 population at 2,415,266 at 2019 census
- 2026 Population expected to hit 3,689,330 by the end of the year.

== See also ==
- Ouagadougou history (de, fr)

== Bibliography ==
in English

- Elliott Percival Skinner (1974). African Urban Life: the Transformation of Ouagadougou. Princeton University Press. ISBN 978-0-691-03095-1.
- Sylvy Jaglin (1994). "Why Mobilize Town Dwellers?: Joint Management in Ouagadougou, 1983-1990". Environment and Urbanization. 6.
- Paul Tiyambe Zeleza; Dickson Eyoh, eds. (2003). "Ouagadougou, Burkina Faso". Encyclopedia of Twentieth-Century African History. Routledge. ISBN 0-415-23479-4.
- David P. Johnson, Jr. (2010). "Ouagadougou, Burkina Faso". In Kwame Anthony Appiah; Henry Louis Gates (eds.). Encyclopedia of Africa. Oxford University Press. ISBN 978-0-19-533770-9.
- Stephanie Dos Santos; Thomas LeGrand (2013). "Is the Tap Locked? An Event History Analysis of Piped Water Access in Ouagadougou, Burkina Faso". Urban Studies. 50 (6): 1292. Bibcode:2013UrbSt..50.1292D. doi:10.1177/0042098012462613. S2CID 154333151.
- Antoni Folkers; Iga Perzyna, eds. (2017). Beeker Method: planning and working on the redevelopment of the African City. African Studies Centre Leiden. hdl:1887/47176. ISBN 978-90-5448-160-7. (Includes articles about Ouagadougou)
- Page, Willie; Davis, R. Hunt, eds. (2005). Encyclopedia of African History and Culture Volume II: African Kingdoms (500 to 1500) (E-book ed.). New York: Facts on File. ISBN 978-1-4381-2917-4.

in French

- R. Deniel (1969). "Croyances religieuses en milieu urbain: Ouagadougou". Social Compass (in French). 16: 101–108. doi:10.1177/003776866901600108. S2CID 144947263.
- J. Tezanou; et al. (2001). "Caractérisation des déchets dans la ville de Ouagadougou". Déchets Sciences et Techniques (in French). ISSN 2268-7289.
- Alexandra Biehler (2006). "Renouveau urbain et marginalisation: Le cas du centre-ville de Ouagadougou, Burkina-Faso". Tiers Monde (in French). 47 – via Persee.fr.
- Julie Vallée; et al. (2006). "Stratification de la ville de Ouagadougou (Burkina Faso) à partir d'une image panchromatique Spot 5: Une première étape à la mise en place d'une enquête de santé" [Stratification of Ouagadougou (Burkina Faso) from a Panchromatic Image (Spot 5): a First Step for Health Survey]. Espace populations sociétés (in French) (2–3): 393–401. doi:10.4000/eps.1851 – via Revues.org.
- Profil Urbain de Ouagadougou (in French). United Nations Human Settlements Programme. 2007.
