= 105.2 FM =

FM radio frequency

This is a list of radio stations that broadcast on FM frequency 105.2 MHz:

== Afghanistan ==
- Radio Afghanistan in Kabul

== Burkina Faso ==
- Ouaga FM in Ouagadougou

== China ==
- CNR The Voice of China in Xiamen
- CNR Business Radio in Linfen
- Guangzhou Traffic Radio in Guangzhou

== Ireland ==
- Phantom FM in Dublin

== Isle of Man ==
- Energy FM at Ballasaig

== Luxembourg ==
- Bel RTL in Neufchâteau

== Latvia ==
- Radio SWH in Riga and Daugavpils

== Taiwan ==
- Transfer CNR The Voice of China in Kinmen County

== United Kingdom ==
- Energy FM in Maughold
- Greatest Hits Radio Birmingham & The West Midlands
- Heart South Wales in Abergavenny and Carmarthenshire
- Greatest Hits Radio South Coast in Fareham
- Smooth Scotland in Glasgow

== New Zealand ==
- BrianFM(105.2 Version) in Taranaki
