= Radiodiffusion Nationale =

Radiodiffusion Nationale (fr: national broadcasting) may refer to:

- Radiodiffusion Nationale (France), France (1939-45)
- Radiodiffusion Nationale Belge (RNB), a Free Belgian radio broadcaster based in the Belgian Congo
- Radiodiffusion Nationale Tchadienne, Chad
- Radiodiffusion Nationale, Burkina Faso
- Société Nationale de Radiodiffusion et de Télévision, Morocco
- Entreprise nationale de Radiodiffusion sonore, Algeria
- Burundi National Radio and Television (Radiodiffusion Nationale de la République du Burundi), Burundi
