= Telecommunications in Burkina Faso =

Telecommunications in Burkina Faso include radio, television, fixed and mobile telephones, and the Internet.

The telephony market in Burkina Faso is still relatively underdeveloped. Although mobile penetration is just over 100%, it is still below the African average. Fixed-line telephony and internet connections are very low, due in large part to poor network infrastructure. The government has a number of policies intended to improve the levels of investment and usage of networks but the impact of the SARS-Cov2 pandemic has hampered such efforts.

Radio is the country's most popular communications medium. Use of telecommunications in Burkina Faso are extremely low, limited due to the low penetration of electricity, even in major cities. There were just 141,400 fixed line phones in use in 2012, in a country with a population of 17.4 million. Use of mobile phones has skyrocketed from 1.0 million lines in 2006 to 10 million in 2012. Internet use is also low, with only 3.7 users per 100 inhabitants in 2012, just over 643,000 users total. The Internet penetration rate in Africa as a whole was 16 users per 100 inhabitants in 2013.

== Regulation and control ==
The constitution and law provide for freedom of speech and of the press, and the government generally respects these rights in practice.

All media are under the administrative and technical supervision of the Ministry of Communications, which is responsible for developing and implementing government policy on information and communication. The Superior Council of Communication (SCC), a semiautonomous body under the Office of the President, monitors the content of radio and television programs, newspapers, and Internet Web sites to ensure compliance with professional ethics standards and government policy. The SCC may summon journalists and issue warnings for subsequent violations. Hearings may concern alleged libel, disturbing the peace, inciting violence, or violations of state security.

Journalists occasionally face criminal libel prosecutions and other forms of harassment and intimidation. In addition to the prohibition against insulting the head of state, the law also prohibits the publication of shocking images and lack of respect for the deceased. Although the government does not attempt to impede criticism, some journalists practice self-censorship.

The Burkinabé government, in its telecommunications development strategy, has stated its aim to make telecommunications a universal service accessible to all. A large portion of this strategy is the privatization of the National Telecommunications Office (ONATEL), with an additional focus on a rural telephony promotion project. In 2006 the government sold a 51 percent stake in the national telephone company, ONATEL, and ultimately planned to retain only a 23 percent stake in the company.

== Radio and television ==
- Radio stations: 2 AM, 26 FM, and 3 shortwave stations; state-owned radio runs a national and regional network; substantial number of privately owned radio stations; transmissions of several international broadcasters available in Ouagadougou (2007).
- Television stations: 14 digital channels, 2 of them are state-owned by the broadcaster Radio Télévision du Burkina (2019).

Radio is the country's most popular communications medium. Dozens of private and community radio stations and a handful of private TV channels operate alongside their state-run counterparts. The BBC World Service, Voice of America, and Radio France Internationale are all on the air in the capital, Ouagadougou.

== Telephones ==
- Calling code: +226
- International call prefix: 00
- Main lines:
  - 141,400 lines in use (2012);
  - 94,800 lines in use, 144th in the world (2006).
- Mobile cellular:
  - 10.0 million lines, 79th in the world (2012);
  - 1.0 million lines, 123rd in the world (2006).
- Telephone system: system includes microwave radio relay, open-wire, and radiotelephone communication stations; fixed-line connections stand at less than 1 per 100 persons; mobile-cellular usage, fostered by multiple providers, is increasing rapidly from a low base (2011).
- Satellite earth stations: 1 Intelsat (Atlantic Ocean) (2011).
- Communications cables: Burkina Faso is linked to the global submarine cable network and the international Internet backbone through Senegal's Sonatel fibre-optic transmission network.

== Early Development of the Mobile Market ==
The state-run Office National Des Telecommunications (ONATEL) launched the first mobile network based on CDMA2000 technology in 1998.

Competition was introduced to the mobile telephone segment in 2000 with the introduction of new GSM network operators Celtel, Télécel Faso and ONATEL's Telmob. This pushed rates down even as density and coverage area increased.

Use of mobile phones grew quickly in the 2000s, growing from 2,700 subscribers in 1998, to 1.0 million in 2006, to 10.0 million in 2012. and to 21.4 million in 2020.

ARPU remained low, however, as mobile subscribers adopted behaviours such as "flashing" to minimize their costs and Burkina Faso's ancient oral tradition and talking drum culture harmonized with the introduction of mobile phone technologies. Additionally, mobile phone owners acquired status by being able to lend their phones to others in their communities.

== International Group Involvement ==
In 2006, Maroc Telecom(itself part of Etisalat group) took a majority stake in ONATEL, which it increased to 61% in 2018 and from July 1, 2019, Maroc Telecom consolidated Onatel, Mauritel, Gabon Télécom, Sotelma, Casanet, AT Côte d'Ivoire, Etisalat Benin, AT Togo, AT Niger, AT Centrafrique, and Tigo Tchad in its accounts.

In January 2021, Maroc Telecom rebranded all of its African subsidiaries as Moov Africa.

In 2005, Celtel was acquired by the Kuwaiti Zain Group.

In 2010, Zain Group decided to sell most of the Celtel group to Indian group Bharti Airtel, which rebranded Celtel as Airtel Burkina Faso.

In June 2016, Orange S.A. acquired the network and 4.6M subscribers of Airtel Burkina Faso. Following an ambitious network modernization plan, 9 months later the network rebranded as Orange Burkina Faso boasting a subscriber base of 6.3M.

According to the website of the Communication Regulator of Burkina Faso, at the end of 2020 the Mobile Telecommunications Market (21.4M subscriptions) was shared as follows:

- Orange BF S.A. 9,403,367 subscriptions (43.72%)
- Onatel S.A. 9,086,709 subscriptions (42.24%)
- Télécel Faso S.A 2,946,469 subscriptions (13.70%)

== Internet ==
- Top-level domain: .bf
- Internet users:
  - 643,504 users, 127th in the world; 3.7% of the population, 194th in the world (2012);
  - 178,100 users, 144th in the world (2009);
  - 80,000, 146th in the world (2006).
- Fixed broadband: 14,166 subscriptions, 139th in the world; 0.1% of population, 169th in the world (2012).
- Wireless broadband: Unknown (2012).
- Internet hosts:
  - 1,795, 164th in the world (2012);
  - 193 hosts, 178th in the world (2007).
- IPv4: 32,512 addresses allocated, less than 0.05% of the world total, 1.9 addresses per 1000 people (2012).
- Internet service providers: 1 ISP (1999).

Internet use is low, but the sector began to improve following installation of a 22 Mbit/s fiber optic international link, a vast improvement over the previous 128 kbit/s link. Secondary access nodes began to appear in major cities, and cybercafés were providing Internet access to a broader spectrum of end users.

ONATEL's FasoNet is the country's leading wired Internet service provider, dominating the broadband market with its ADSL and EV-DO fixed-wireless offerings.

The mobile operators are offering data services using GPRS and EDGE technology, and third generation (3G) mobile broadband technology was not introduced until 2013 by Bharti Airtel.

A March 2013 ITU Study on international Internet connectivity in sub-Saharan Africa reports that the Burkina Faso "Internet market is not sufficiently dynamic and competitive" and that the high costs for Internet capable mobile phones (more than six times the cost of a basic mobile phone) and mobile Internet subscriptions (up to seven times the cost for basic mobile) limit the number of Internet users.

=== Internet censorship and surveillance ===
There are no government restrictions on access to the Internet; however, the Superior Council of Communication (SCC) monitors Internet Web sites and discussion forums to ensure compliance with existing regulations. For example, in May 2012 the SCC issued a warning to a Web site on which a user had allegedly insulted President Compaore in an Internet forum.

The constitution and law provide for freedom of speech and of the press, and the government generally respects these rights in practice. The law prohibits persons from insulting the head of state or using derogatory language with respect to the office; however, individuals criticize the government publicly or privately without reprisal.

The constitution and law prohibit arbitrary interference with privacy, family, home, or correspondence, and the government generally respects these prohibitions in practice. In cases of national security, however, the law permits surveillance, searches, and monitoring of telephones and private correspondence without a warrant.

== See also ==
- Radio Télévision du Burkina, national broadcaster of Burkina Faso.
- Maroc Telecom, a 51% owner of ONATEL since December 2006.
- List of terrestrial fibre optic cable projects in Africa
- Media in Burkina Faso
- Economy of Burkina Faso
