= List of ambassadors of Burkina Faso to Austria =

Coordinates: 48.195742°N 16.376065°E

Ambassador of Burkina Faso to the Austria
- Inaugural holder: Thomas Sanon
- Formation: April 1, 1998

The Burkinabe ambassador to Austria is the official representative of the Government in Ouagadougou to the Government of Austria. He is concurrently accredited in Belgrade (Serbia), Zagreb (Croatia), Budapest (Hungary), Prague (Czech Republic), Bratislava (Slovakia), Ljubljana (Slovenia), (United Nations Office at Vienna).

== List of representatives ==
Diplomatic accreditation	Ambassador	Observations	List of prime ministers of Burkina Faso	List of chancellors of Austria	Term end
April 1, 1998	Thomas Sanon		Kadré Désiré Ouédraogo	Viktor Klima	January 1, 2002
March 12, 2003	Noellie Marie Béatrice Damiba		Paramanga Ernest Yonli	Wolfgang Schüssel	January 1, 2008
January 1, 2008	Salif Diallo		Tertius Zongo	Werner Faymann	October 1, 2011
April 14, 2014	Paul Robert Tiendrebeogo	28 mars 2012	Luc-Adolphe Tiao	Werner Faymann	October 8, 2014
October 1, 2014	Solange Rita Bogore Agneketom		Luc-Adolphe Tiao	Werner Faymann	March 1, 2015
March 1, 2015	Eric Ismaël Zoungrana	Chargé d'affaires	Yacouba Isaac Zida	Werner Faymann	
March 1, 2015	Saïdou Zongo		Yacouba Isaac Zida	Werner Faymann	March 17, 2015
March 17, 2015	Solange Rita Bogore Agneketom		Yacouba Isaac Zida	Werner Faymann	January 6, 2016
January 6, 2016	Saïdou Zongo	Chargé d'affaires	Paul Kaba Thieba	Werner Faymann	October 4, 2016
October 4, 2016	Dieudonné Kéré		Paul Kaba Thieba	Christian Kern	January 19, 2019
