= Xavier Niodogo =

Burkinabé diplomat

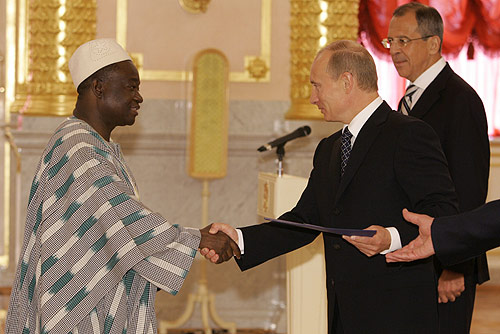
- Xavier Niodogo presents his Letters of Credence to Russian president Vladimir Putin on 27 July 2007.

Burkinabé Ambassador to Berlin
- In office 28 May 2003 – 2011
- Preceded by: Jean-Baptiste Ilboudo
- Succeeded by: Marie Odile Bonkoungou-Balima

Personal details
- Born: 1953 Kouritenga Province

Xavier Niodogo is a Burkinabé diplomat.

From 28 May 2003 to 2011 he was Ambassador Extraordinary and Plenipotentiary of Burkina Faso to Germany, with concurrent accreditation to the Russian Federation and Ukraine.
