= List of ambassadors of Burkina Faso to Mali =

Coordinates: 12.631071°N 8.014645°W

Ambassador of Burkina Faso to Mali
- Incumbent; Kodio Lougue since November 11, 2013
- Inaugural holder: Daouda Diallo
- Formation: October 4, 1960

The Burkinabe ambassador in Bamako is the official representative of the Government in Ouagadougou to the Government of Mali.

== List of representatives ==
Diplomatic accreditation	Ambassador	Observations	List of prime ministers of Burkina Faso	List of prime ministers of Mali	Term end
October 4, 1960	Daouda Diallo		Sangoulé Lamizana	Modibo Keïta	July 9, 1966
January 1, 1970	Dougoukolo Henri Ouattara		Sangoulé Lamizana	Moussa Traoré	December 25, 1974
January 1, 1974	Jean-Baptiste Ilboudo	Résidence Abidjan, Agacher Strip War	Sangoulé Lamizana	Moussa Traoré	January 1, 1983
October 1, 1983	Frédéric A. Korsaga	Résidence Abidjan De 1983 à 1986, Frédéric Korsaga prend le relais et va résider toujours à Abidjan en raison de la deuxième guerre (dite guerre de Noël éclatée en décembre 1985) entre les deux pays.	Thomas Sankara	Moussa Traoré	November 1, 1984
September 1, 1986	Anne Konaté/Kondé		Thomas Sankara	Mamadou Dembelé	December 2, 1989
January 1, 1991	Hamadou Koné	Amadou Koné	Thomas Sankara	Soumana Sacko	January 1, 1992
May 1, 1993	Moïse Traoré		Youssouf Ouédraogo	Abdoulaye Sékou Sow	August 28, 1995
August 29, 1995	Sophie Sow		Roch Marc Christian Kaboré	Ibrahim Boubacar Keïta	March 30, 2003
April 25, 2003	Mohamed Sané Topan		Paramanga Ernest Yonli	Ahmed Mohamed Ag Hamani	October 23, 2013
November 11, 2013	Kodio Lougue	Officier général, est nommé Ambassadeur du Burkina Faso en République du Mali.	Luc-Adolphe Tiao	Oumar Tatam Ly	
