= Sidwaya =

Burkinabè newspaper

Sidwaya is a French-language newspaper in Burkina Faso. It was founded in 1984 following the Thomas Sankara government's closure of the independent Observateur. Among the printed media of Burkina Faso its circulation is second to the reopened L'Observateur Paalga, and Sidwaya is still associated with the government view. Its editor-in-chief in 1984 was Béatrice Damiba who went on to serve as Burkinabé ambassador to Austria and Italy. Notable journalists include Mariam Ouédraogo.
