= List of ambassadors of Burkina Faso to France =

Coordinates: 48.874853°N 2.309006°E

Ambassador of Burkina Faso to the France
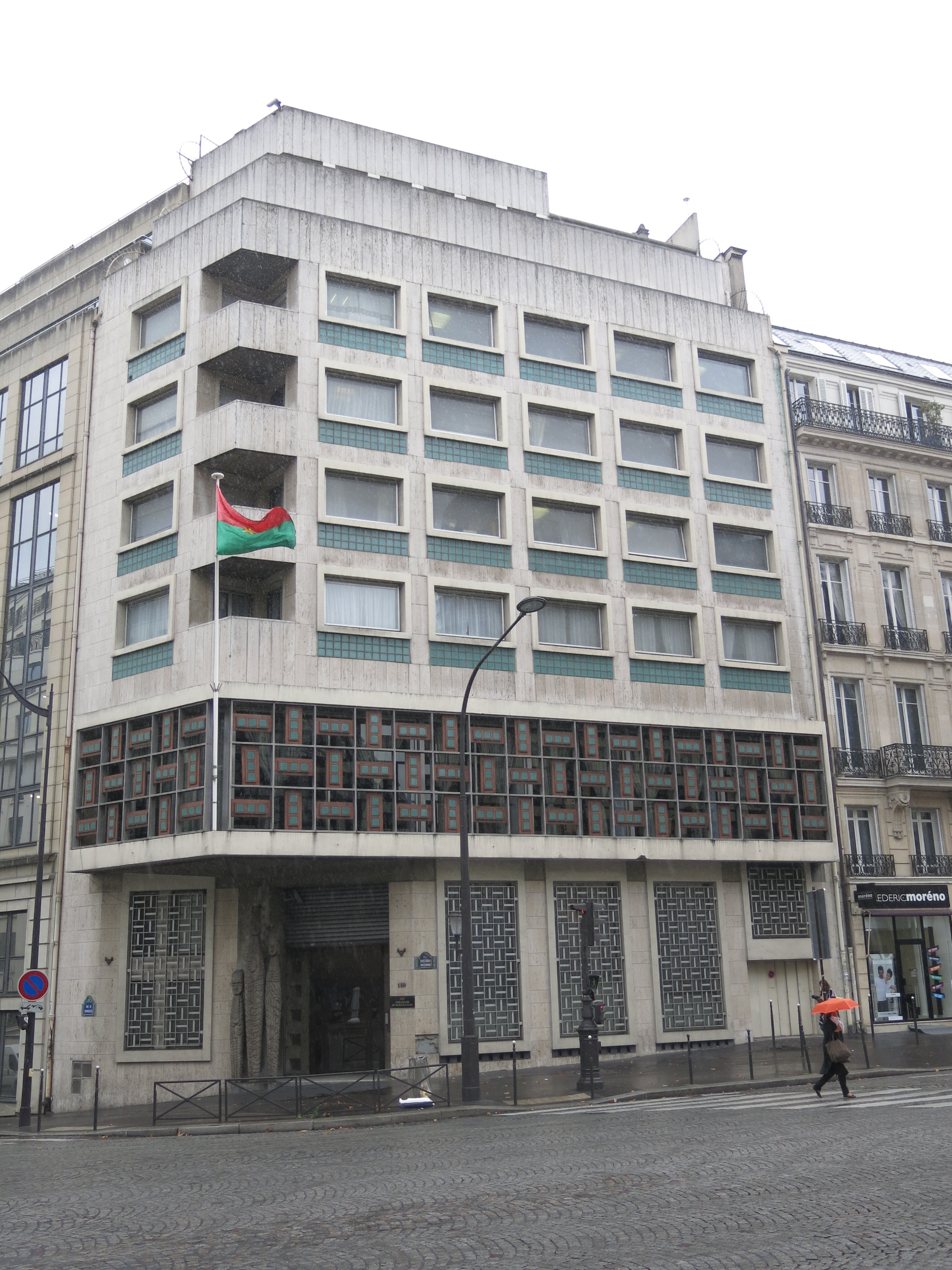
- Incumbent; Alain Francis Gustave Ilboudo since November 9, 2016
- Inaugural holder: Pierre Claver Ilboudo
- Formation: July 6, 1961

The Burkinabe ambassador in Paris is the official representative of the Government in Ouagadougou to the Government of France. Burkina Faso severed diplomatic relations with France on June 26, 2026 and closed its Embassy in Paris.

== List of representatives ==
Diplomatic accreditation	Ambassador	Observations	List of heads of state of Burkina Faso	List of presidents of France	Term end
July 6, 1961	Henri Guissou		Maurice Yaméogo	Charles de Gaulle	1964
April 4, 1964	Mathias Sorgho		Maurice Yaméogo	Charles de Gaulle	1966
September 17, 1966	Henri Guissou		Sangoulé Lamizana	Charles de Gaulle	January 1, 1974
September 8, 1972	Victor Kabore		Sangoulé Lamizana	Georges Pompidou	1974
January 1, 1974	Pierre Claver Ilboudo	(*September 13, 1948 in Manga) September 23, 1967: Ambassador to Bonn.	Sangoulé Lamizana	Valéry Giscard d'Estaing	1981
January 1, 1981	Martin Parkouda	Chargé d'affaires	Saye Zerbo	François Mitterrand	1987
December 20, 1991	Serge Théophile Balima		Thomas Sankara	François Mitterrand	1992
January 1, 1992	Ambroise Silga	Chargé d'affaires	Youssouf Ouédraogo	François Mitterrand	1993
February 1, 1993	Frédéric Assomption Korsaga		Youssouf Ouédraogo	François Mitterrand	1997
October 17, 1996	Filippe Savadogo		Kadré Désiré Ouédraogo	Jacques Chirac	2007
January 1, 2007	Firmin Grégoire N'Do Piabié	Chargé d'affaires	Tertius Zongo	Nicolas Sarkozy	2009
September 15, 2008	Luc Adolphe Tiao Beyon		Tertius Zongo	Nicolas Sarkozy	2011
December 22, 2011	Joseph Paré		Luc-Adolphe Tiao	Nicolas Sarkozy	2013
November 15, 2013	Eric Yemdaogo Tiare		Luc-Adolphe Tiao	François Hollande	2016
November 9, 2016	Alain Francis Gustave Ilboudo		Paul Kaba Thieba	François Hollande	
January 20, 2022	Remis Fulgance Dandjinou				2023
