= Damiba =

Damiba is a Burkinabé surname. Notable people with the surname include:

- Noellie Marie Béatri Damiba (born 1951), Burkinabé journalist and diplomat
- Paul-Henri Sandaogo Damiba (born 1981), Burkinabé military officer
