= Horizon Radio =

Horizon Radio may refer to:

- Heart 103.3, formerly Horizon Radio, of Milton Keynes, UK
- Horizon FM, a radio station in Burkina Faso
- Horizont (radio station) (or Horizon Radio; Bulgarian: Хоризонт), a Bulgarian radio station
- Line-of-sight propagation, sometimes known as horizon radio
- Over-the-horizon radar
