= List of ambassadors of Burkina Faso to Russia =

Ambassador of Burkina Faso to Russia
- Incumbent; Aristide R. Ludovic Tapsoba since November 5, 2024
- Inaugural holder: Georges Bamina Nebie
- Formation: September 21, 1968

The Burkinabe ambassador in Moscow is the official representative of the Government in Ouagadougou to the Government of Russia.

== List of representatives ==
Diplomatic accreditation	Ambassador	Observations	List of heads of state of Burkina Faso	List of heads of government of Russia	Term end
September 21, 1968	Georges Bamina Nebie		Sangoulé Lamizana	Leonid Brezhnev	1972
1972	Guy Mathieu Bado	Charge d'affaires a.i.			1973
August 16, 1973	Victor G. Kabore		Sangoulé Lamizana	Leonid Brezhnev	1975
October 24, 1975	Oubkiri Marc Yao		Sangoulé Lamizana	Leonid Brezhnev	1979
August 6, 1980	Lonkou Olivier Kini		Sangoulé Lamizana	Leonid Brezhnev	1984
May 13, 1986	Mélégué Maurice Traoré		Thomas Sankara	Konstantin Chernenko	1988
December 28, 1988	Hanitan Jonas Ye		Blaise Compaoré	Mikhail Gorbachev	1993
November 4, 1993	Jean- Baptiste Ilboudo		Blaise Compaoré	Viktor Chernomyrdin	1996
February 12, 1996	Jérôme Somé	Embassy of Burkina Faso in Moscow was closed in 1996	Blaise Compaoré	Viktor Chernomyrdin	1996
June 27, 2014	Antoine Somdah	Antoine Somdah presented his credentials to Ministry of Foreign Affaires on 7 March 2014 and reopened its embassy in Moscow	Blaise Compaoré	Dmitry Medvedev	2022
2022	Bassirou Zoma	Charge d'affaires a.i.			2024
November 5, 2024	Aristide R. Ludovic Tapsoba		Ibrahim Traoré	Vladimir Putin	

- Burkina Faso–Russia relations
