= Christophe Kalenzaga =

Burkinabé politician

Ambassador of the Republic of Upper Volta to Bonn
- In office February 21, 1964 – 1967
- Succeeded by: Pierre Ilboudo

Personal details
- Born: 1910 village of Oualaga ( Kaya, Burkina Faso Sanmatenga Province)
- Died: April 25, 1994; Ouagadougou

Christophe Kalenzaga (born 1910 in Oualaga, Burkina Faso, and died April 25, 1994, in Ouagadougou) was a politician from Burkina Faso who was elected for French Upper Volta to the French Senate in 1948. On November 14, 1948, he was elected, on May 18, 1952, and June 8, 1958, reelected. On July 15, 1959, his mandate ended due to the Termination of mandate pursuant to Order No. 58-974 of October 17, 1958, relating to the provisional operation of public authorities. From February 21, 1964, till 1967 he was Ambassador of the Republic of Upper Volta to Bonn.

== Education ==
He spent three years studying philosophy at a missionary seminar.

== Politician ==
From October 1948 to March 1949, he was President of the Grand Conseil de l'Afrique occidentale française French West Africa, comprising members of the Territorial Assemblies of French West Africa (Afrique Occidentale Française) and French Equatorial Africa (Afrique Equatoriale Française). Since 1947 was attached to the governments of the High Commissioners of these areas as parliamentary institutions. In 1948 he became a member of the Senate of the French Republic and belonged to him until the year 1958. In 1955 he was appointed as the French representative of the Consultative Assembly of the Council of Europe and the Assembly of the Western European Union. From 1957 to 1959 Christoph Kalenzaga was President of the Voltaic Democratic Union (UDV), the local group of the supra-territorial Rassemblement Démocratique Africain (RDA) under Félix Houphouët-Boigny of the Ivory Coast. The UVD. In the referendum of General de Gaulle, he successfully called for a "yes" and thus for remaining in the French Communouté. In 1959 he was elected Senator of the Communauté. From March to April 1959 he was Minister of State in the Council of Ministers of President Maurice Yaméogo.

== Diplomat ==
On March 23, 1962, Christoph Kalenzaga presented his credentials as Ambassador of the Republic of Upper Volta to Heinrich Lübke, President of the Federal Republic of Germany.
