= Djibril Bassolé =

Burkinabé politician and diplomat (born 1957)

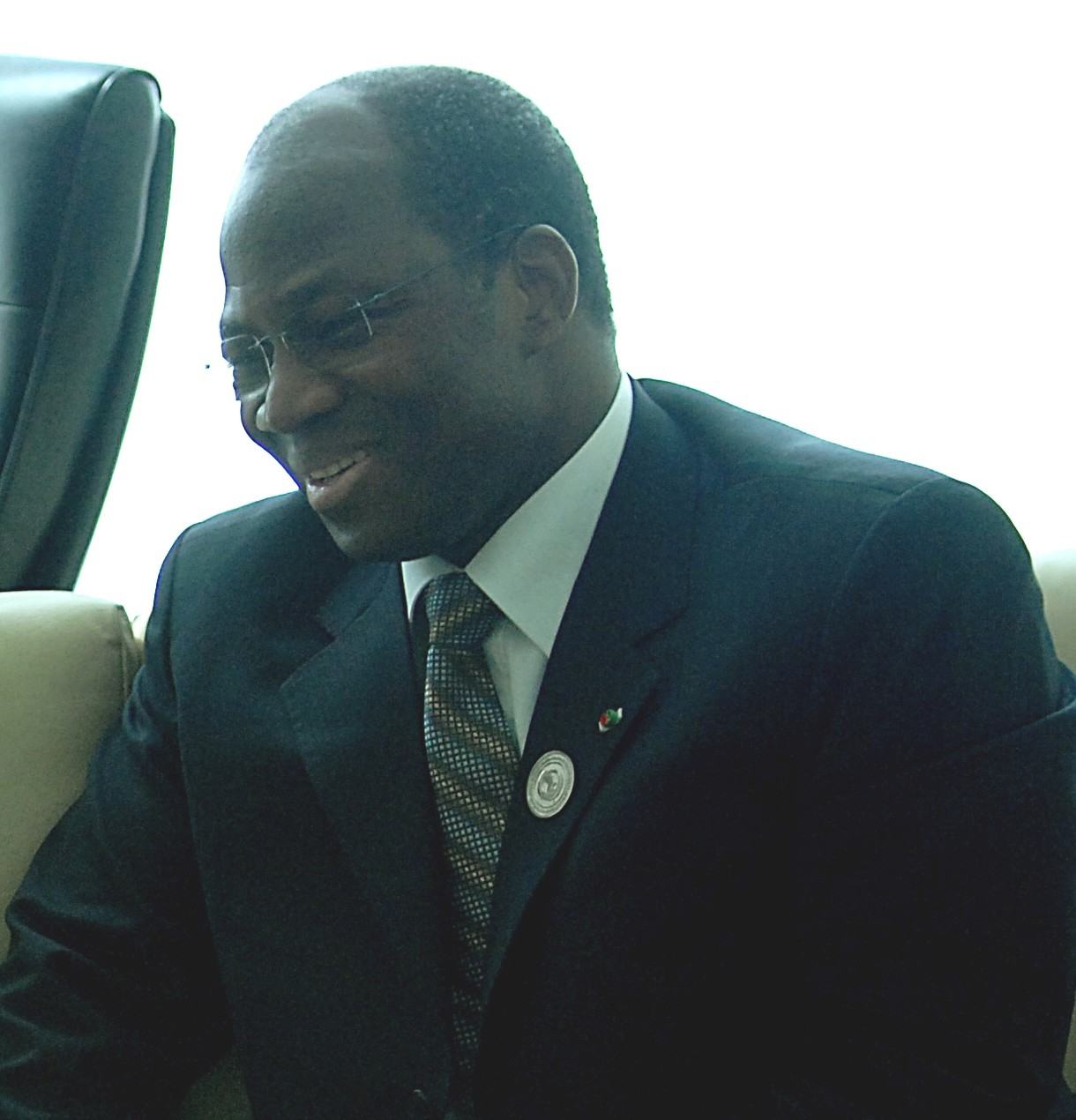
Bassolé in 2008

Djibrill Yipènè Bassolé (born November 30, 1957) is a Burkinabé politician and diplomat. He served in the government of Burkina Faso as Minister of Security from 2000 to 2007 and as Minister of Foreign Affairs and Regional Cooperation from 2007 to 2008. Bassolé was the Joint African Union-United Nations Chief Mediator for Darfur from 2008 to 2011, and the Burkinabé Minister of Foreign Affairs for a second time from 2011 to 2014.

== Career ==
Bassolé was born in Nouna and joined the military, rising through the ranks. He was a member of the international committee for the monitoring of elections in Togo from 1993 to 1994, and from 1994 to 1995 a member of the mediation committee working towards the resolution of the 1990–1995 Tuareg rebellion in Niger.

From January 11, 1999, to January 12, 2000, he served as Burkina Faso's as Deputy Minister for Security. On November 12, 2000, he was promoted to the post of Minister of Security, serving in that position until he was appointed as Minister of Foreign Affairs and Regional Cooperation in the government of Prime Minister Tertius Zongo on June 10, 2007; he replaced Youssouf Ouédraogo as Foreign Minister.

On June 30, 2008, Bassolé was appointed as the Joint African Union-United Nations Chief Mediator for Darfur. Prior to taking up the post, he made a preparatory visit to Sudan on July 20, meeting with Sudanese President Omar al-Bashir. During this visit, he said that he faced a difficult task in mediating between the Sudanese government and the Darfur rebels, but that it was "not mission impossible". Some believed that Bassolé's mission would be made more difficult by his inability to speak Arabic or English. Bassolé took up his post as Chief Mediator on August 1, 2008, and was replaced as Burkinabé Foreign Minister in the government appointed on September 3, 2008.

Bassolé returned to the Burkinabé government as Foreign Minister in 2011. On 9 May 2013, he passed out and collapsed while participating in a news conference in Ankara alongside Ahmet Davutoğlu, the Foreign Minister of Turkey. He was subsequently hospitalized.

Following the ouster of President Compaoré in October 2014, Bassolé lost his ministerial post and a transitional government was set up. Bassolé became the Special Envoy of the Organization of Islamic Cooperation (OIC) for Peace in the Sahel region and participated in the achievement of a peace agreement for Mali signed in Algeria. He subsequently planned to stand as an independent candidate in the October 2015 presidential election. He was initially cleared to run by the Constitutional Council, but later, in a decision on 10 September 2015, the court barred him from running despite the fact that ECOWAS already stood behind inclusion, when its courts ruled that the reform of the electoral code to exclude candidates did not fall within the bounds of the law. His exclusion was based on a law that barred supporters of the 2014 proposal to eliminate term limits from standing, and it was considered that Bassolé fell afoul of that law because he had been present at a government meeting to prepare the legislation that would have allowed Compaoré to run again. Bassolé made a statement saying that the decision of the Constitutional Council would not put an end to his political career and that he was going to work side by side with his candidates to win the legislative election.

Following a September 2015 failed coup by the Regiment of Presidential Security, which was closely associated with Compaoré, Bassolé's assets were among those frozen by state prosecutors on 26 September 2015, although they were subsequently unfrozen on 8 October 2015. The coup leaders had denounced the exclusionary electoral law and planned to allow all candidates to participate. Bassolé was arrested on 29 September for allegedly supporting the coup, even though coup leader Gilbert Diendéré declared on Radio Oméga that Bassolé was not involved in the coup. Bassolé insisted that he was innocent and argued, through his lawyer, that he was a "political prisoner". According to his lawyer, the accusation was "a blatant lie" and Bassolé was "neither the organiser, an accomplice or a beneficiary" of the coup. He said that the case lacked evidence and was "simply a way of preventing him from participating in the electoral process."

Preceded by Youssouf Ouedraogo	Foreign Minister of Burkina Faso; 2007-2008	Succeeded by Alain Bédouma Yoda
