= Prosper Vokouma =

Burkinabé diplomat and politician

Prosper Vokouma (born 4 August 1955) is a Burkinabé diplomat and politician who served in the government of Burkina Faso as minister of foreign affairs from 1989 to 1991. He became Burkina Faso's Permanent Representative to the United Nations Office at Geneva and the World Trade Organization in 2008.

== Career ==
Vokouma entered the civil service in April 1982, when he was appointed as a department head at the Directorate of Bilateral Cooperation, part of the Ministry of Foreign Affairs. Subsequently, he was appointed as Director of Political Affairs in 1984 and as High Commissioner of Naouri Province in 1987.

Following the assassination of President Thomas Sankara in October 1987, Vokouma was appointed as Secretary-General of the Government and the Council of Ministers by President Blaise Compaore on 31 October 1987. After two years in that position, he was instead appointed as Minister of Foreign Relations on 21 September 1989. He was dismissed from the government on 26 July 1991, when Issa Dominique Konaté was appointed to replace him as foreign minister. Later, he was Political Adviser to the President of the National Assembly in 1995.

Vokouma was Secretary-General of the National Assembly from 2000 to 2008. He left the latter position when he was assigned to a diplomatic posting in Switzerland: on 12 March 2008, he was accredited as Burkina Faso's Permanent Representative to the United Nations Office at Geneva and the World Trade Organization, and he additionally presented his credentials as Ambassador to Switzerland to the President of the Swiss Confederation, Pascal Couchepin, on 1 July 2008.

Vokouma was dismissed from his post as Ambassador to Switzerland on 20 March 2015.

Preceded by Issou Go	Foreign Minister of Burkina Faso; 1989–1991	Succeeded by Issa Dominique Konaté
