= Pierre Claver Damiba =

Burkinabè economist and politician (1937–2024)

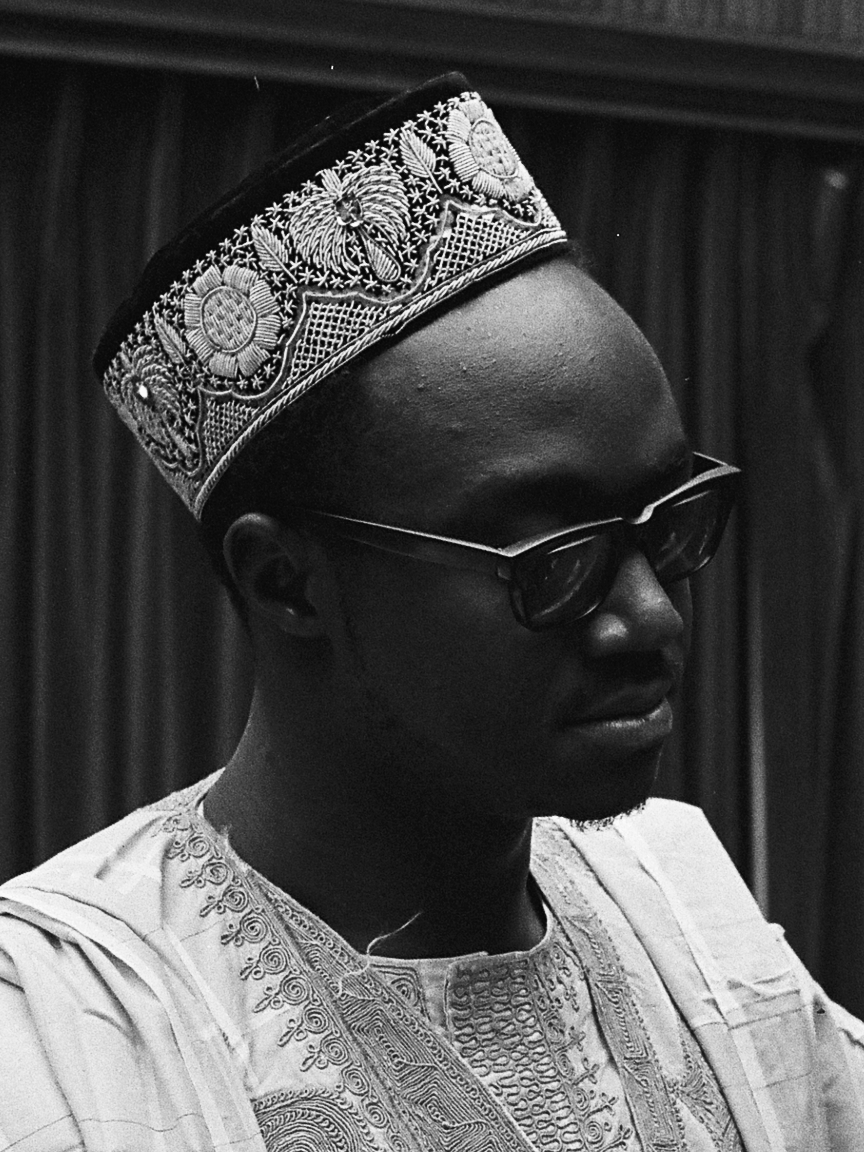
- Damiba in 1970

Member of the National Assembly of Upper Volta
- In office 1978–1980
- In office 1971–1974

Minister of Planning and Public Works
- In office January 1966 – February 1971

Personal details
- Born: 14 February 1937 Koupéla, French Upper Volta, French West Africa
- Died: 1 May 2024 (aged 87) Ouagadougou, Burkina Faso
- Occupation: Economist

Pierre Claver Damiba (14 February 1937 – 1 May 2024) was a Burkinabè economist and politician.

== Biography ==
Born in Koupéla on 14 February 1937, Damiba was the brother of journalist and diplomat Noellie Marie Béatri Damiba. He served as Minister of Planning and Public Works from 1966 to 1971 and was a member of the National Assembly from 1971 to 1974 and from 1978 to 1980. He was the first Executive President of the West African Development Bank, located in Togo. He was then an African advisor to the International Finance Corporation and African regional director of the United Nations Development Programme.

Damiba died in Ouagadougou on 1 May 2024, at the age of 87.
