= Mass media in Burkina Faso =

The mass media in Burkina Faso consists of print media and state-supported radio, news, and television stations, along with several private broadcasters with programs consisting of sports, music, cultural, or religious themes.

== Government media influence and control ==
In Burkina Faso, the authorities have periodically announced their respect for freedom of the media; RadioDiffusion Burkina states that the country's transmission facilities are open to "all political and social sensibilities". Privately owned newspapers, television, and radio stations are allowed. The Information Code of 1987 provided for freedom of speech and freedom of the press.

However, there are serious exceptions to this freedom. A revised Information Code, implemented in 1993, allows for news outlets to be arbitrarily banned if "accused of endangering national security or distributing false news." The Conseil Supérieur de la Communication (CSC), the government's Supreme Council on Information, is charged with media oversight. Additionally, non-legal constraints on critics of the government exist.

The mission statement of the state-owned Radiodiffusion-Télévision du Burkina (RTB) declares that its broadcast networks are "adapted" to the requirements of law and democratic pluralism. It emphasizes that journalists using public mediums are obliged to "respect the principles of ethics" with regards to "objectivity and balance" in the treatment of information.

== Acts against journalists and government critics ==
In December 1998, journalist Norbert Zongo was murdered by unknown assailants, and his body burned. Since his death, the tragedy has been used by unidentified persons leaving 'warnings' to journalists and broadcast commentators critical of alleged government injustice and/or corruption.

In August 2002, police in Burkina Faso arrested Newton Ahmed Barry, editor-in-chief of the private monthly L'Evénement. Barry was held for two days before being released without charge.

Mathieu N’do, managing editor of the opposition weekly San Finna, was detained by authorities on November 5, 2004, as he was returning from Ivory Coast. His detention may have been linked to his journalistic work, which is often critical of the Burkina Faso government. In particular, N’do has been an outspoken critic of government policy in Ivory Coast where Burkina Faso has been accused of arming the rebellion. N'do was held incommunicado by Burkina Faso's national security service in Ouagadougou until being released without charge on November 11.

Since the death of Norbert Zongo, several protests regarding the Zongo investigation and treatment of journalists have been prevented or dispersed by government police and security forces. In April 2007, popular radio reggae host Karim Sama, whose programs feature songs containing societal criticism interspersed with commentary on alleged government injustice and corruption, received several death threats. Sama's personal car was later burned outside the private radio station Ouaga FM by unknown vandals.

In response, the Committee to Protect Journalists (CPJ) wrote to the President of the Republic, Blaise Compaoré, to request his government investigate the sending of e-mailed death threats to journalists and radio commentators in Burkina Faso who were critical of the government. In December 2008, police in Ouagadougou questioned leaders of a protest march that called for a renewed investigation into the unsolved Zongo assassination. Among the marchers was Jean-Claude Meda, the president of the Association of Journalists of Burkina Faso.

On the 27th of March 2023, Jean-Emmanuel Ouédraogo issued a signed statement stating that the government has suspended all France 24 broadcasts after the airing of an interview with the head of al-Qa'ida in North Africa. “...the government discovered two weeks ago an interview with the ‘chief of al-Qaida in the Islamic Maghreb’ on France 24, part of the France Medias Monde group... France 24 is not only acting as a mouthpiece for these terrorists, but worse, it is providing a space for the legitimisation of terrorist actions and hate speech," The statement gave no right of reply to France 24. The interview in question is still available to watch directly on France 24's website.

On the 28th of March, France 24 responded in a statement that they "strongly deplore" the decision and "the channel has never invited him to speak directly on its programmes, and has simply reported his words in the form of a column, ensuring the necessary distance and context." The Media Foundation of West Africa (MFWA) was against the decision made by the Bakina Faso authorities.

US Organisation Human Rights Watch also stood against the decision, reporting that the military government's decision to suspend France 24 was illegal because such decisions come from the Superior Council for Communication (Conseil supérieur de la communication, CSC), not the government. "The military government’s suspension of France 24 violates Burkina Faso law. A 2013 decree empowers the agency that regulates media operations, the Superior Council for Communication (CSC), to determine whether to suspend or sanction a media outlet. “It’s up to the CSC to issue any sanctions to news media, not the government...The CSC is also supposed to provide advance notice for its decisions and all its final decisions may be appealed before competent courts.”

Two French correspondents in the country, Sophie Douce of Le Monde and Agnès Faivre from Libération were expelled from Burkina Faso after “The March 27 publication of a Libération investigation into the circumstances in which a video was filmed showing children and adolescents being executed in a military barracks by at least one soldier," Jean-Emmanuel Ouedraogo denied that his military was responsible for the killings, saying that it “strongly condemns these manipulations disguised as journalism to tarnish the image of the country”. Ouedraogo told the Associated Press (AP) that it denied involvement and that militants often disguise themselves as security forces and film their actions in order to blame the government.". France 24 claim that the correspondents were expelled for no reason, suggesting the timing could only be coincidental. "The reason that is now being used by the country’s government to justify suspending the channel’s broadcasting rights has never been mentioned."

Both Burkina Faso and Mali have suspended France 24 and Radio France Internationale (RFI) broadcasts. Burkina Faso suspended RFI broadcasts in December 2022.

France 24 continues to be available in Burkina Faso via Direct Satellite reception (SES 5 and Eutelsat 15A) and online sources.

== Print media ==
- L'Evénement, monthly
- L'Hebdomadaire du Burkina, weekly
- L'Indépendant, weekly, founded in 1993
- Le Journal du Jeudi, satirical weekly
- L'Observateur Paalga, daily with a weekly supplement, founded in 1973, burnt down in 1984, reestablished in 1991
- L'Opinion, weekly
- Le Pays, daily, founded in 1991
- San Finna, weekly, appearing Mondays, since 1999
- Sidwaya, 1984-, daily

== Television ==
TV Channels

- Canal 3 (Groupe Fadoul)

- Radio Télévision du Burkina

== Radio ==
The government radio corporation Radiodiffusion Nationale runs one radio station in Ouagadougou and another in Bobo-Dioulasso. Broadcasts are in French and 13 indigenous languages, using both medium wave (AM) and FM frequencies. RTB also maintains a worldwide short-wave news broadcast (Radio Nationale Burkina) in the French language from the capital at Ouagadougou using a 100 kW transmitter on 4.815 and 5.030 MHz.

There are also several independent radio stations, as well as foreign radio services such as the Ahmadiyya Islamic Radio of Bobo Dioulasso, BBC and Radio France Internationale (RFI 1 - Afrique) using satellite feeds. As of 2002, there were 3 AM and 17 FM radio stations, including:

On the FM band

17 FMs, including:

- RTB
- Ouaga FM
- Horizon FM
- Radio Salankoloto

On the MW band

3 stations

On the SW band

3 stations (as of 2002)

== News agencies ==
- Agence d'Information du Burkina (est. 1964 as L'Agence Voltaïque de Presse) is the government press agency.

== See also ==
- Communications in Burkina Faso
- Cinema of Burkina Faso

== Bibliography ==
- "Burkina Faso: Directory: the Press". Africa South of the Sahara 2004. Regional Surveys of the World. Europa Publications. 2004. p. 128+. ISBN 1857431839.
- Toyin Falola; Daniel Jean-Jacques, eds. (2015). "Burkina Faso: Media". Africa: an Encyclopedia of Culture and Society. ABC-CLIO. ISBN 978-1-59884-666-9.
- "Burkina Faso", Freedom of the Press, USA: Freedom House, 2016, OCLC 57509361, archived from the original on 2018-12-29
