= Adjaratou Lompo =

Burkinabe filmmaker

- Born: 1960
- Occupation: Filmmaker

Adjaratou Lompo (born 1960) is a filmmaker from Burkina Faso.

== Biography ==
Adjaratou Lompo was born in 1960. She attended the Institut National de Formation Artistique et Culturelle (INAFEC). She is employed by Radio Télévision du Burkina.

Her film Si je savais (2001) depicts a female student educating her village about the dangers of female genital mutilation. Her La Cour des Veuves (2005) depicts the problems encountered by widows. Les Amazones du cinéma africain (2015) is her documentary about women in the film industry.

== Filmography ==
- Le Pari " The Gamble ", doc., 26mn, 1992
- Si je savais " If I knew ", fiction, 52mn, 2001
- Une Seconde Vie " A second life ", doc., 26mn, 2005
- La Cour des Veuves " The Widow’s court ", doc., 26mn, 2005
- Récif/ONG : Un réseau de reference Recif/NGO: A model network, doc., 26mn, 2006
- Affaires Publiques " Public Affairs ", série télé, Saison 2, 2010
- Affaires Publiques " Public Affairs ", série télé, Saison 3, 2012
- Le Visionnaire de Nassira " The Visionary of Nassira ", doc., 26mn, 2014
- Les Amazones du cinéma africain " The Amazons of African Cinema ", doc., 52mn, 2014
