= Rosine Sori-Coulibaly =

Burkinabé economist and politician

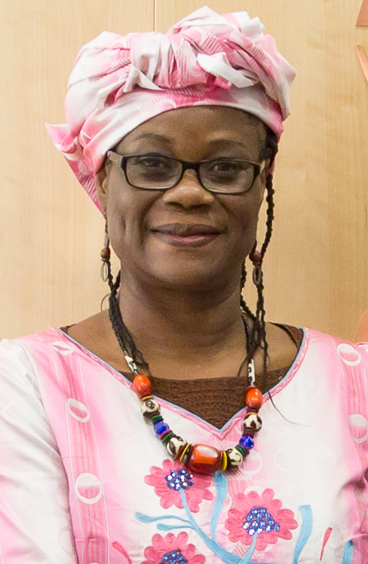
- Rosine Sori-Coulibaly in 2016

Minister of Foreign Affairs
- In office 10 December 2021 – 24 January 2022
- Prime Minister: Lassina Zerbo
- Preceded by: Alpha Barry
- Succeeded by: Olivia Rouamba

Minister of Economy, Finance and Development
- In office 13 January 2016 – 24 January 2019
- President: Roch Marc Christian Kaboré
- Prime Minister: Paul Kaba Thieba
- Preceded by: Jean Sanon
- Succeeded by: Lassané Kaboré

Personal details
- Born: 1958 (age 67–68)
- Education: Cheikh Anta Diop University

Rosine Sori-Coulibaly (born 1958) is a Burkinabé economist and politician. She served as the minister of foreign affairs from 2021 to 2022. After being in the running to become the prime minister of Burkina Faso, she served as the minister of economy, finance and development from 2016 to 2019.

== Education ==
Sori-Coulibaly holds a master's degree in development economics from Cheikh Anta Diop University and a postgraduate degree from the United Nations Institute for Economic Development and Planning.

== Career ==
Sori-Coulibaly has held positions in the Ministry of Economic Planning and Development and in the Social and Economic Council and has lectured at the National School of Administration. In 2011, United Nations Secretary-General Ban Ki-moon appointed Sori-Coulibaly as Deputy Special Representative of the United Nations Office in Burundi and United Nations Resident Coordinator, Resident Representative and Humanitarian Coordinator for Burundi.

In early January 2016, Sori-Coulibaly was considered a favourite to become prime minister of Burkina Faso. On the 13th of that month, Sori-Coulibaly was named Burkina Faso's Minister of Economy, Finance and Development by Roch Marc Christian Kaboré, the country's President. Media reports which began as stories on social media on the day prior to the announcement indicated that she had been selected as the nation's first female prime minister. She said in response to the rumours that were spread, "I lived this rumor everyone. I learned through social networks and close calls. But you know very well that it is the President who appoints the prime minister and that it was not the prerogative of those who spread this information." In 2021, she became the minister of foreign affairs.

== Other activities ==
- African Development Bank (AfDB), Ex-Officio Member of the Board of Governors (since 2016)
- International Monetary Fund (IMF), Ex-Officio Member of the Board of Governors (since 2016)
- Multilateral Investment Guarantee Agency (MIGA), World Bank Group, Ex-Officio Member of the Board of Governors (since 2016)
- World Bank, Ex-Officio Member of the Board of Governors (since 2016)

== Personal life ==
Rosine is married and has two children.
