= Moussa Nébié =

Burkinabé diplomat

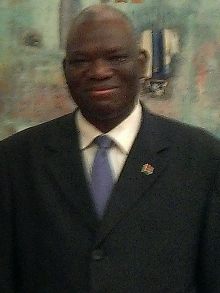
- Nébié in 2015

Minister of Foreign Affairs
- In office 20 July 2015 – January 2016
- Preceded by: Michel Kafando
- Succeeded by: Alpha Barry

Personal details
- Born: 8 September 1959 (age 67) Pouni, Burkina Faso

Moussa Nébié (born 8 September 1959) is a Burkinabé diplomat who was Minister of Foreign Affairs of Burkina Faso from July 2015 to January 2016.

== Career ==
Nébié was appointed as Minister of Foreign Affairs on 20 July 2015 by transitional President Michel Kafando, who relinquished the title, following a reshuffle in the run up to the 2015 elections. Prior to becoming Foreign Minister, Nébié was Minister of State for Regional Cooperation, and before that, he served as Ambassador to Egypt and Ambassador to Ethiopia and the African Union.
