= Mariam Ouédraogo =

Burkinabé journalist (born 1982)

- Born: 1982 (age 43–44); Ivory Coast
- Citizenship: Burkina Faso
- Occupation: Journalist
- Years active: 2013–present
- Employer: Sigweya
- Children: 1
- Awards: Bayeux Calvados-Normandy Award (2022)

Mariam Ouédraogo (born c. 1982) is a Burkinabé journalist. Known for her work as a war correspondent for the daily newspaper Sidwaya, particularly on the impact of the Islamist insurgency in Burkina Faso on women, she received the Bayeux Calvados-Normandy Award for war correspondents in 2022.

== Biography ==
Ouédraogo was born into a polygamous family in Ivory Coast and grew up in the Nord Region of Burkina Faso. After finishing high school, she studied law for two years before deciding to become a journalist. In 2008, after failing the entrance exam to study at the Institut des sciences et techniques de l'information et de la communication, Ouédraogo worked as an intern for the Agence d'information du Burkina, before formally starting her journalism studies in 2011. She is Muslim and lives with her daughter in Ouagadougou.

Since 2013, Ouédraogo has worked as a journalist for Sidwaya, a daily state-run French-language national newspaper, with an average circulation of 5000 copies a day. Her reporting for the newspaper has primarily focused on the experiences of disadvantaged groups in Burkina Faso, including women, children and the disabled. In 2015, an article Ouédraogo wrote on the experiences of blind students led to the Burkinabé government establishing a commission to make the education system more inclusive for visually impaired learners. A 2018 report on the impact of a lack of ultrasound machines on the health of pregnant people led to the Prime Minister of Burkina Faso announcing the purchase and installation of multiple machines. Ouédraogo has also published interviews with disabled beggars in Ouagadougou and sex workers who had given birth to their clients' children.

Ouédraogo became more well known for her war reporting following the outbreak of an Islamist insurgency in Burkina Faso in 2015. She published many articles on human rights abuses against women during the conflict, including the use of rape as a weapon of war. She collated a series of articles on the experiences of displaced women, including those who had been raped and tortured while fleeing their villages, and some who had given birth to children conceived through rape, in Axe Dablo-Kaya: la route de l'enfer des femmes déplacées internes (transl. Dablo-Kaya axis: the road to hell for internally displaced women), which prompted the Burkinabé government to relocated hundreds of displaced women into "solidarity hotels". In late 2022, Ouédraogo began an eight-month break from journalism due to a resurgence of post-traumatic stress disorder developed during her reporting. She has advocated for the mental health of journalists to be taken more seriously and has criticised female journalists being "caricatured" as being more emotional than their male counterparts.

In 2019, Ouédraogo won the Anti-Corruption Prize from the Réseau national de lutte anti-corruption. In 2020, she won the Prix Galian for best investigative journalism. In 2022, Ouédraogo became the first female African journalist to win the Bayeux Calvados-Normandy Award for her war reporting on the Burkinabé conflict against armed jihadist groups. She was the second African journalist to win the prize. Ouédraogo expressed concern that the win would put at risk family members who lived in conflict zones. She also won the Marie-Soleil Frère Award for written press for best Burkinabé journalist for three consecutive years between 2021 and 2023. She received the Mohamed Maïga African Investigative Journalism Award. In 2023, she received the Knight International Journalism Award. In 2025, the Kerala Media Academy named Ouédraogo as its Media Person of the Year, the first African journalist named.
