= Lompolo Koné =

Burkinabé playwright, editor and diplomat

Lompolo Koné (1921 – 1974) was a Burkinabé playwright, editor, and diplomat. He served as Upper Volta's foreign minister from 1961 to 1966.

Political offices
Preceded by Maurice Yaméogo	Foreign Minister of Upper Volta; 1961-1966	Succeeded by Sangoulé Lamizana
