= List of ambassadors of Burkina Faso to Germany =

Coordinates: 52.507408°N 13.270250°E

Ambassador of Burkina Faso to Germany
- Incumbent; Toro Justin Ouoro since June 15, 2023
- Inaugural holder: Christophe Kalenzaga
- Formation: March 23, 1962

The Burkinabe ambassador in Berlin is the official representative of the Government in Ouagadougou to the Government of Germany. He is concurrently accredited in Tallinn (Estonia).

== List of representatives ==
Diplomatic accreditation	Ambassador	Observations	List of prime ministers of Burkina Faso	List of chancellors of Germany	Term end
March 23, 1962	Christophe Kalenzaga		Maurice Yaméogo	Konrad Adenauer	1964
February 21, 1964	Henri Guissou	Henri Guissou was born in 1910 in Wagudugu, the capital of today's Republic of Upper Volta. After attending school in his home country he went to the well-known teacher's college William Ponty in Dakar,	Maurice Yaméogo	Ludwig Erhard	1967
September 12, 1967	Pierre Ilboudo		Maurice Yaméogo	Kurt Georg Kiesinger	1972
August 18, 1972	Aissé Mensah		Gérard Kango Ouédraogo	Willy Brandt	1977
March 10, 1977	Tiémoko Marc Garango		Sangoulé Lamizana	Helmut Schmidt	1981
October 15, 1981	Gomtirbou Anatole Tiendrebeogo		Saye Zerbo	Helmut Schmidt	1986
October 17, 1986	Marie Savadogo	(* 1952) 1986 formerly a member of the embassy in Bonn	Thomas Sankara	Helmut Kohl	1988
June 16, 1988	Moumouni Fabre		Thomas Sankara	Helmut Kohl	March 31, 1991
September 5, 1991	Sophie Sow		Thomas Sankara	Helmut Kohl	1995
October 16, 1995	Jean-Baptiste Ilboudo		Roch Marc Christian Kaboré	Helmut Kohl	2001
May 28, 2003	Xavier Niodogo		Paramanga Ernest Yonli	Gerhard Schröder	2011
February 24, 2012	Marie Odile Bonkoungou Balima		Luc-Adolphe Tiao	Angela Merkel	May 2015
November 10, 2015	Simplice Honore Guibila		Isaac Zida	Angela Merkel	2023
June 15, 2023	Toro Justin Ouoro				
