= Karamoko Jean-Marie Traoré =

Burkinabé politician

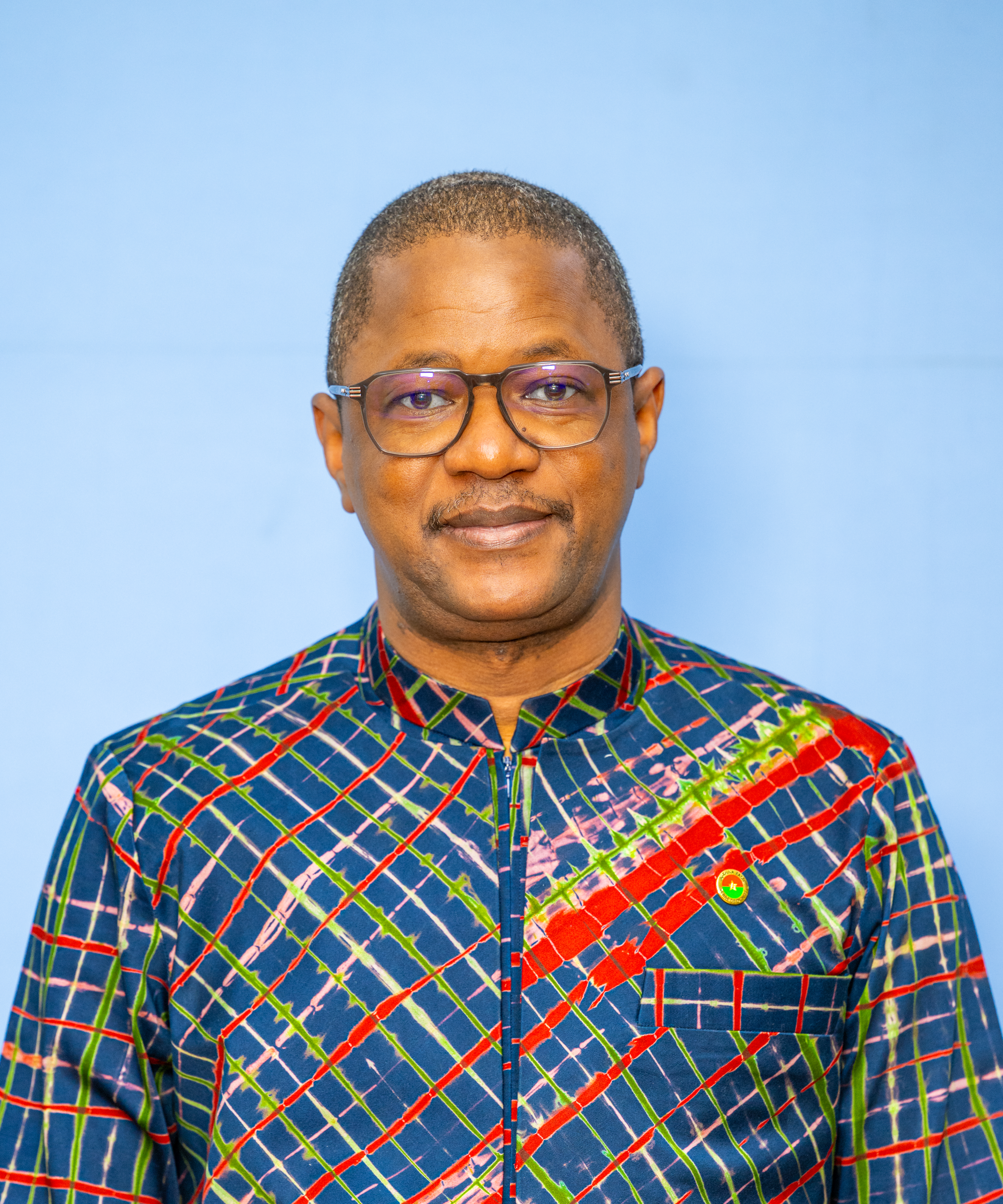

Minister of Foreign Affairs
- Incumbent
- Assumed office December 19, 2023
- Prime Minister: Apollinaire J. Kyélem de Tambèla
- Preceded by: Olivia Rouamba

Personal details
- Born: October 14, 1972 (age 53) Nouna, Burkina Faso
- Occupation: Politician

Karamoko Jean-Marie Traoré is a Burkinabé politician who has been Minister of Foreign Affairs since December 2023.

== Education and career ==
Born on October 14, 1972, in Nouna, Burkina Faso, Traoré pursued higher education at the University of Ouagadougou and trained in diplomacy at the National School of Administration and Magistracy (ENAM).

Traoré took over from Olivia Rouamba in December 2023, following a government reshuffle by President Ibrahim Traoré. Traoré was previously in charge of regional cooperation.
