= Sophie Sow =

Sophie Sow is a Burkinabė diplomat. She has served as the Ambassador of Burkina Faso to Italy and International Fund for Agricultural Development (IFAD), Mali and Germany

President Blaise Compaoré appointed Sow Ambassador to Italy in 2008. She took up official residence and presented her letters of credentials to Italian President Giorgio Napolitano in March 2008.

In January 2021 President Roch Marc Christian Kaboré appointed Sow to Burkina Faso's Constitutional Council, with a single mandate of nine years. She was nominated to the position by the President of the National Assembly of Burkina Faso.
