= .bf =

Top-level Internet domain for Burkina Faso

- Introduced: 29 March 1993
- Removed: (optional)
- TLD type: Country code top-level domain
- Status: Active
- Registry: ARCEP, Onatel SA
- Sponsor: ARCEP
- Intended use: Entities connected with Burkina Faso
- Actual use: Some use in Burkina Faso, occasionally used by dating sites
- Registered domains: 2,024 (31 December 2022)
- Registration restrictions: Unknown
- Structure: Registrations are made directly at second level; government sites are often at third level beneath .gov.bf
- Documents: Procedures and forms
- Dispute policies: Unknown
- DNS name: DNS name of internationalized TLD
- DNSSEC: Yes
- IDN: Yes if IDN is implemented in the TLD, otherwise No
- Registry website: www.registre.bf

.bf is the Internet country code top-level domain (ccTLD) for the West African nation of Burkina Faso. It was introduced in 1993.

It has been administered by the ARCEP since 2011. Previously, it was sponsored and administered by Delegational Generale Informatique (DELGI).

== See also ==
- AFRINIC
- Internet in Burkina Faso
