= List of ambassadors of Burkina Faso to the European Commission =

Coordinates: 50.815293°N 4.361071°E

Ambassador of Burkina Faso to the European Commission
- Inaugural holder: Salifou Rigobert Kongo
- Formation: January 13, 1992

The Burkinabe ambassador in Brussels is the official representative of the Government in Ouagadougou to the European Commission. She is regularly accredited as Ambassador to the Court of St James's, Ambassador to the Belgian, Dutch, Luxembourger and Irish Government and as representative to the Organisation for the Prohibition of Chemical Weapons.

== List of representatives ==
Diplomatic accreditation	Ambassador	Observations	List of prime ministers of Burkina Faso	President of the European Commission	Term end
January 13, 1992	Salifou Rigobert Kongo		Youssouf Ouédraogo	Jacques Delors	1994
October 24, 1994	Youssouf Ouédraogo		Roch Marc Christian Kaboré	Jacques Delors	1999
July 24, 2001	Kadré Désiré Ouédraogo		Paramanga Ernest Yonli	Romano Prodi	2007
February 20, 2013	Frédéric Assomption Korsaga		Luc-Adolphe Tiao	José Manuel Barroso	2014
December 10, 2016	Jacqueline Marie Zaba Nikiema		Paul Kaba Thieba	Jean-Claude Juncker	2019
