= Alpha Barry =

Burkinabé politician and journalist

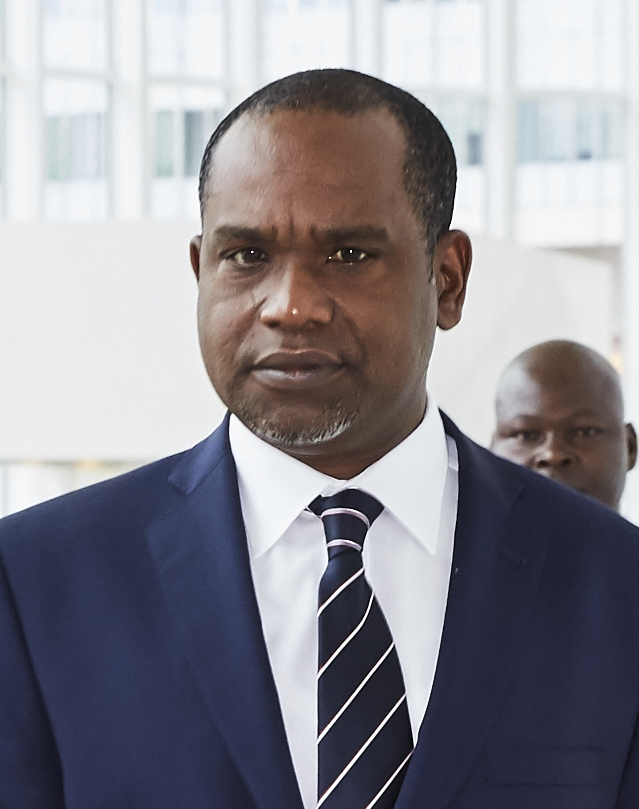

Minister of Foreign Affairs
- In office 12 January 2016 – 8 December 2021
- Preceded by: Moussa Nébié
- Succeeded by: Rosine Sori-Coulibaly

Personal details
- Born: Alpha Mamadou Barry; 1 January 1970 (age 56) Ouragahio, Ivory Coast

Alpha Barry (born 1 January 1970) is a Burkinabé politician and journalist. He served as the Minister of Foreign Affairs from 2016 to 2021.

== Biography ==
Barry is born on 1 January 1970 in Ivory Coast. His birth name is Alpha Mamahuevo Barry. He has been a correspondent of RFI in Ouagadougou and collaborator of magazine Jeune Afrique.

12 January 2016, he was appointed the Minister of Foreign Affairs of Burkina Faso.

Barry owns the Omega media group which was suspended on 12 August 2023, by the government of Burkina Faso for airing an "insulting" interview with Nigerian anti-junta spokesmen Ousmane Abdoul Moumouni. The interviewer criticized the Junta and talked about restoring President Bazoum to power. The government stated that the interview was "clearly campaigning for violence and war against the sovereign people of Niger."

== Health ==
During the 2020 coronavirus outbreak, on 20 March, Barry contracted the coronavirus.
