= Radio Salankoloto =

Radio station in Burkina Faso

Radio Salankoloto is a radio station in Burkina Faso. It is broadcast on 97.3 FM from the city of Ouagadougou. It was established on November 22, 1996.

It plays mostly African music from traditional to modern hip-hop.

== See also ==
- Media of Burkina Faso
