= Thomas Sanon =

Burkinabe politician and diplomat

Thomas Sanon (born 8 September 1947) is a Burkinabé politician and former diplomat who has been President of the Economic and Social Council of Burkina Faso since 2003. Under President Blaise Compaoré, Sanon previously held various positions in the government and was an ambassador.

== Life and career ==
Sanon was born in Kokorooué. After completing his education, he worked at the French Company of Textile Fiber Development from 1970 to 1984. He was then Director-General of the National Social Security Fund from 1988 to 1989, and on 24 April 1989 he was appointed to the government as Minister of Transport and Communication. On 22 September 1989, he was appointed Minister of Economic Promotion, and on 16 June 1991 Minister of Industry, Trade and Mines. Following the 1992 parliamentary election, in which he was elected to the National Assembly, Sanon was appointed as minister of foreign affairs on 20 June 1992; he held that post until 22 March 1994, when he was appointed Minister for Relations with Parliament.

In the 1997 parliamentary election, Sanon was again elected to the National Assembly. Also in 1997, he was appointed as Burkina Faso's Ambassador to Austria, Hungary, the Czech Republic, and Slovakia; he was additionally appointed as Permanent Representative to international organizations based in Vienna. He was again elected to the National Assembly in the 2002 parliamentary election, and appointed as President of the Economic and Social Council on 10 November 2003.

In the May 2007 parliamentary election, Sanon was again elected to the National Assembly as a candidate of the Congress for Democracy and Progress (CDP) in Houet Province, but he remained President of the Economic and Social Council after the election.

Diplomatic posts
Preceded by New title	Ambassador of Burkina Faso to Austria; 1998-2002	Succeeded by Noellie Marie Béatri Damiba
