= Salimata Sawadogo =

Burkinabe diplomat (born 1958)

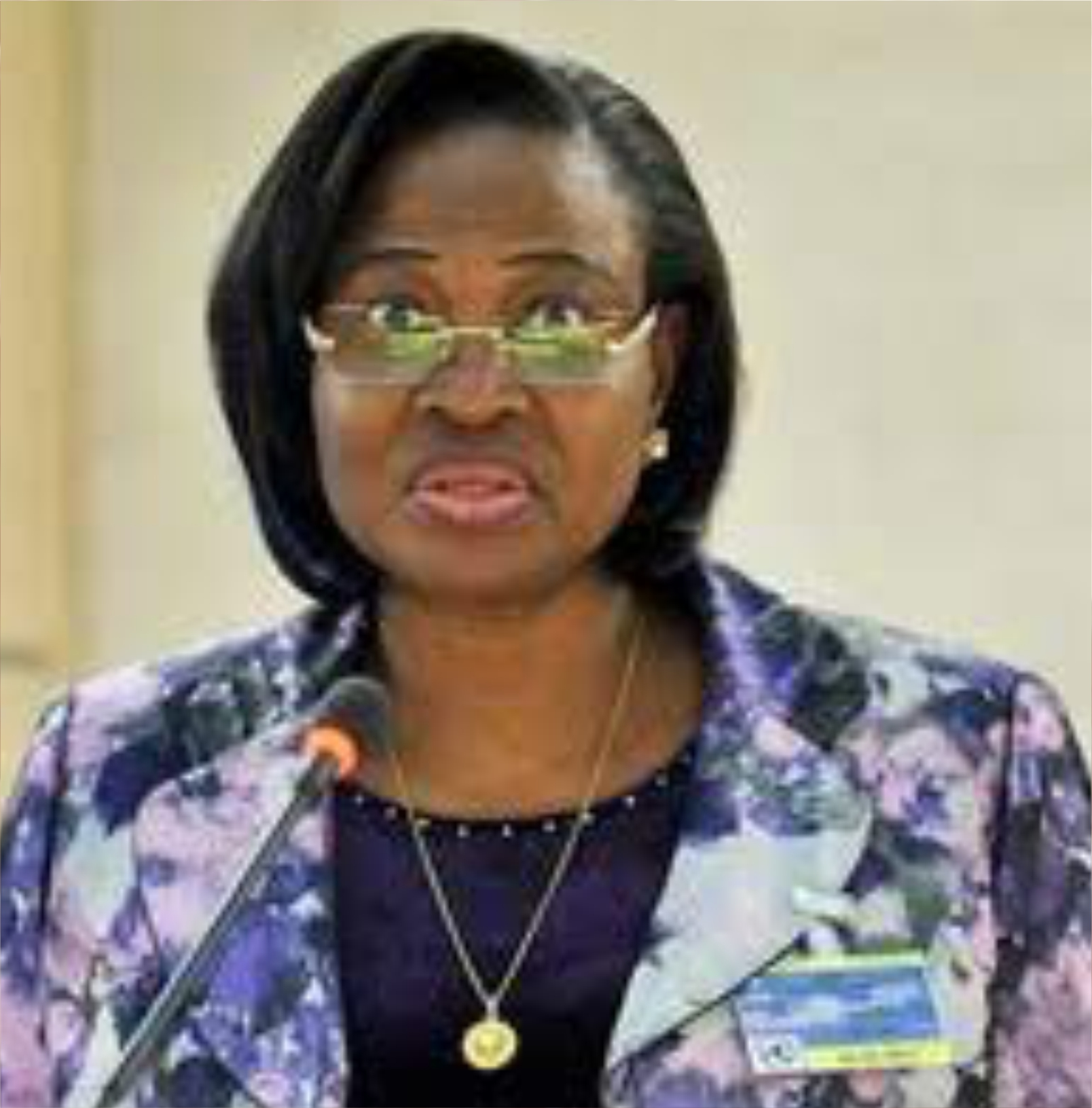
- Sawadogo in 2023

Personal details
- Born: December 31, 1958 (age 67) Ouagadougou, Upper Volta
- Education: University of Ouagadougou; French National School for the Judiciary

Salimata or Salamata Sawadogo Tapsoba (born December 31, 1958, in Ouagadougou, Upper Volta) is the former chair of the African Commission on Human and Peoples' Rights. She is also a magistrate, and (as of 2006), the Ambassador of Burkina Faso to Senegal, Mauritania, Guinea, Cape Verde and Gambia. She is also a member of the Jurist Women's Association of Burkina Faso.

== Education ==
Sawadogo earned her scientific baccalaureate (called in Burkina "BAC D") in 1979. She then entered the University of Ouagadougou's law school, and in 1980 received her Diplôme d'études universitaires générales ("DEUG I", a degree of general academic studies) and in 1981 her "DEUG II". In 1982, she received her law degree, and in 1983 her master's degree in law. In 1985, she received her magistracy degree at the French National School for the Judiciary.

== Career ==
=== Law ===
Sawadogo was an examining magistrate to the Court of Bankruptcy of Ouagadougou. She subsequently became President of the Court of Work of Ouagadougou, judging individual conflicts and questions about social security.

She was a magistrate in the Court of Appeal of Ouagadougou, and later became vice president of the Tribunal de Grande Instance de Ouagadougou.

=== Politics ===
Sawadogo was legal adviser to the Minister of Transport and Tourism in Burkina Faso, and later became Secretary-general of the Ministry for Justice.

In 2001, she was nominated as a member of the African Commission on Human and Peoples' Rights, and in November 2003, she was nominated as its president. She served in this position until November 2007.

=== Ambassador to Senegal ===
Since July 2003, Sawadogo has been the ambassador of Burkina Faso to Senegal, Mauritania, Cape Verde, Guinea Bissau, and the Gambia. Since March 6, 2014 she has also been ambassador to South Africa.

== Professional associations ==
Sawadogo was the president of the jurist's women association of Burkina, AFJ/BF. This association was created in November 1993 to promote women's rights, and to oppose all forms of discrimination against women.

== Personal life ==
Sawadogo resides in Senegal. Since 1985, she has been married to Joseph Sawadogo, an educator who works in Burkina Faso. She has 2 children, Laetitia and Philippe.
