= Serge Théophile Balima =

Burkinabé journalist and diplomat (born 1949)

Serge Théophile Balima (born February 1, 1949) is a Burkinabé journalist, diplomat and professor of the University of Ouagadougou.
