= Daouda Diallo =

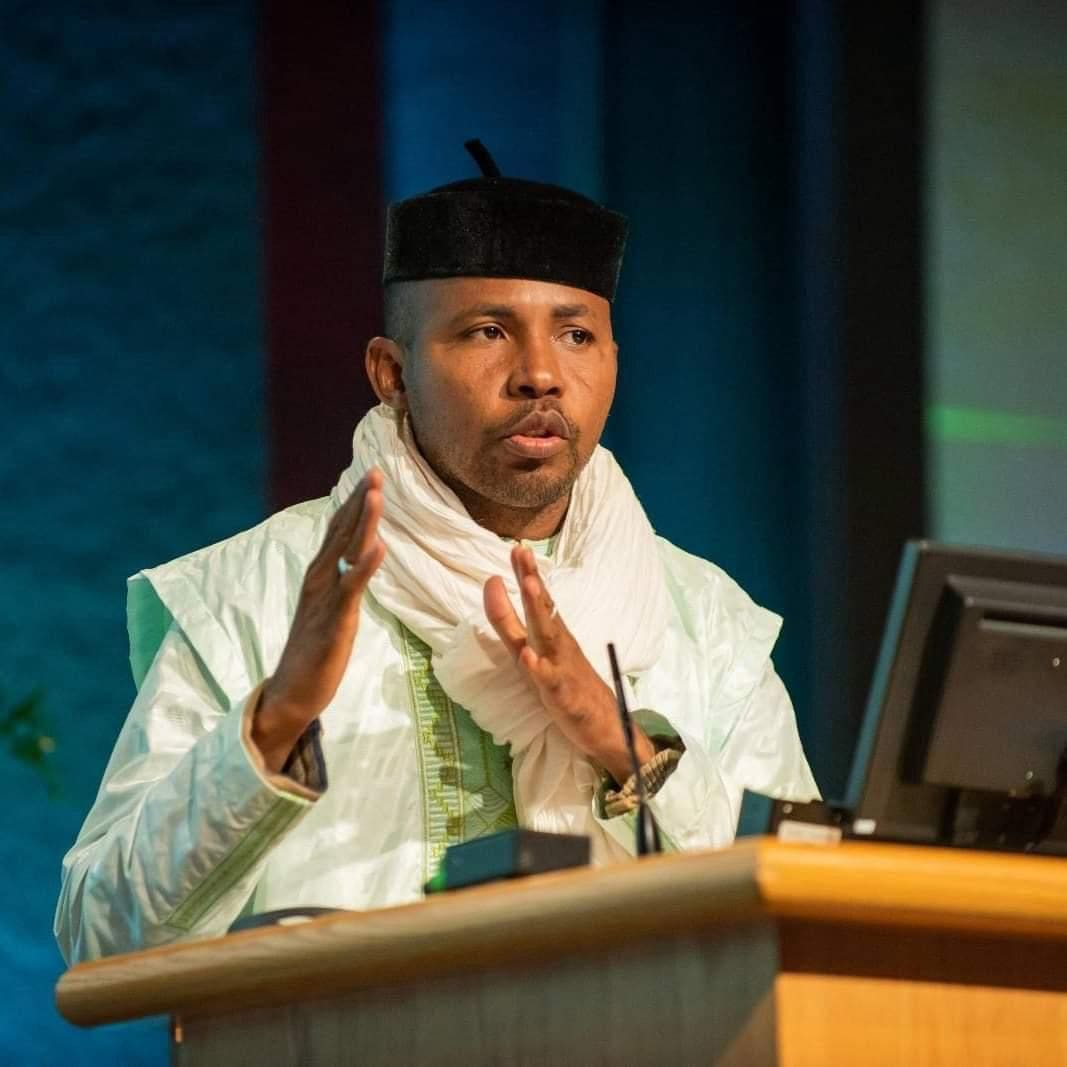
- Daouda Diallo
- Occupations: Pharmacist, human rights defender

Daouda Diallo is a pharmacist and human rights defender from Burkina Faso . Born in Côte d’Ivoire., Since 2019, he is the founder and Secretary General of Collective against Impunity and Stigmatization of Communities (French: Collectif contre 'Impunité et la Stigmatisation des Communautés, CISC). Diallo is recognized internationally for his advocacy for human rights in Burkina Faso, a country facing ongoing political instability and challenges regarding civil liberties.

On December 1, 2023, Diallo was abducted in Ouagadougou by individuals in civilian clothes and taken to an undisclosed location. Human rights organizations, including Human Rights Watch, Fédération internationale pour les droits humains (FIDH), Amnesty International, and the African Commission on Human and Peoples' Rights (ACHPR), condemned the abduction and called for his immediate release. These groups also highlighted the growing dangers faced by human rights defenders in the region and increasing political repression. Diallo was released on March 8, 2024.

== Recognition and awards ==
In 2022, Diallo was honored with the Martin Ennals Award for Human Rights Defenders, which is an award given to individuals who have shown exceptional courage and dedication in the defense of human rights. Knight of the Order of the Stallion of Burkina in 2022 and First Personality of the Year 2022 in Burkina Faso.
