= Energy FM (Isle of Man) =

Radio station in the Isle of Man

- Douglas; Isle of Man
- Frequencies: 98.6 MHz FM; 91.2 MHz FM; 93.4 MHz FM; 98.4 MHz FM; 105.2 MHz FM; 102.4 MHz FM

Programming
- Language: English
- Format: Top 40 (CHR)

Ownership
- Owner: Island FM Ltd. ('Energy FM' on air name and logo used under brand licence agreement)

History
- First air date: 27 July 2001; 24 years ago

Links
- Website: www.energyfm.net

Energy FM is an Isle of Man based radio station which started broadcasting in 2001.

== History ==
One of its longtime staff members was Juan Turner. In 2005, it launched Energy 2 to cater to the over-30 demographic, which was not served by a locally-based station. A merger with 3FM was rumoured in 2013; however Juan Turner denied it. In 2019, the station moved to the media hub at the Champion House in Douglas.

== Transmission ==
Energy FM broadcasts from the Isle of Man on 98.6, 91.2, 93.4, 98.4, 102.4 and 105.2 FM and online via the website energyfm.net and UK Radioplayer. The FM signal can be heard as far away as north Wales, southern Scotland, west Lancashire, and the east of Northern Ireland.

== Background ==
Energy FM is a local radio station in the Isle of Man, providing music and local news for a family audience. It is licensed by the Isle of Man Communications Commission under the Broadcasting Act 1990.

Energy FM started broadcasting on 27 July 2001 and was originally licensed for two years to provide a service aimed at a young audience, playing a mixture of chart and dance music.

When the licence was renewed in 2003, the station format was redesigned to appeal to a more mainstream audience with the inclusion of news, sport and local action programming. The music policy was also changed to focus on a 'hits' format, but still retaining some elements of special programming outside peak hours.

== Local news ==
Providing a news service seven days a week in the Isle of Man, Energy FM also provides national and world news through IRN (Independent Radio News). News bulletins with local content can be heard at various times:

== Programming ==
Energy FM provides local programming from 6am to 1am with non-stop music overnight. Energy FM News on air throughout the day from the Energy FM Infocentre and broadcasts IRN/Sky from 6pm to 6am. A recorded news summary is aired in the weekday evenings.

The programme format is presenter led with music from the current chart mixed with a variety of throwback hits from the past 30 years.

== Music ==
Energy FM plays the biggest current chart hits and popular throwbacks to the naughties and nineties.

== Transmitter Information ==
Frequency	98.6 MHz	91.2 MHz	93.4 MHz	98.4 MHz	105.2 MHz	102.4 MHz
Location	Carnane (Braddan)	Snaefell	Jurby	Ramsey	Ballasaig (Maughold)	Beary Peark (German)
Max ERP	2 kW	1.2 kW	2.3 kW	30W	200W	200W
Direction	315°	30°	150°	150°	170° & 310°	280°
