= Aline Koala Kaboré =

Burkinabé civil servant

Ambassador of Burkina Faso to Senegal
- In office March 29, 2013 – December 19, 2017

Personal details
- Born: Burkina Faso

Aline Koala Kaboré is a diplomat from Burkina Faso who served as Ambassador to Senegal, having presented her credentials on March 29, 2013. She served until December 19, 2017.
