= Radio Télévision du Burkina =

National broadcaster of Burkina Faso

Radiodiffusion Télévision du Burkina
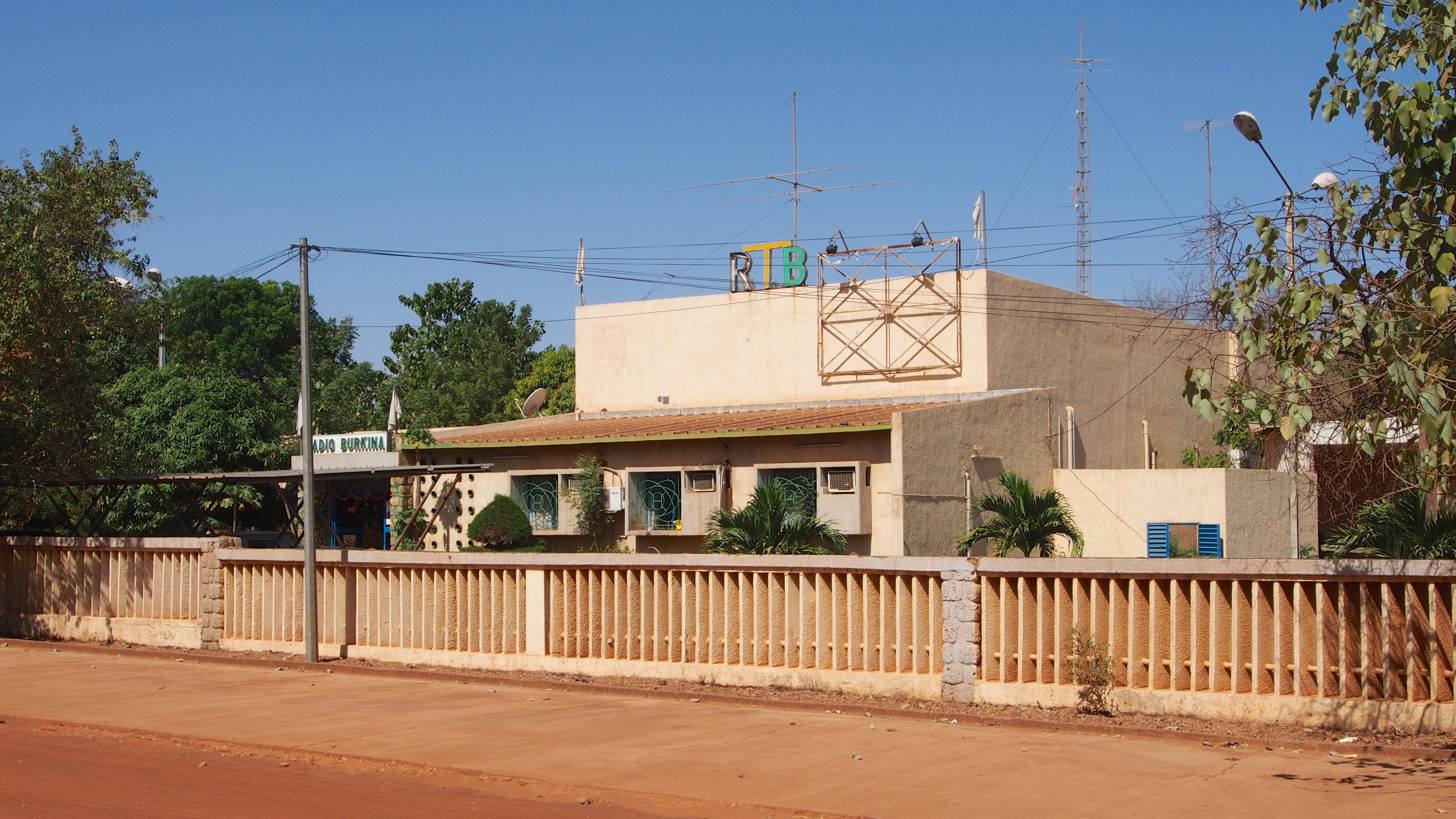
- Headquarters of the Radio Burkina, part of Burkina Faso's national broadcasting company RTB in Ouagadougou
- Type: Broadcast
- Country: Burkina Faso
- Availability: National
- Owner: Government of Burkina Faso
- Launch date: 12 October 1959 (radio); August 1963 (television)
- Former names: Radiodiffusion-Télévision Voltaïque (1963-1984)
- Official website: https://www.rtb.bf/

The Radiodiffusion Télévision du Burkina is the national broadcaster of the West African state of Burkina Faso. Radiodiffusion Télévision du Burkina is headquartered in the capital city Ouagadougou. The general director of RTB is Marcel Toé.

== History ==
Radio Haute-Volta started broadcasting on 12 October 1959, with programmes in French and 13 other languages. It would air for at least 82 hours per week with culture and science programmes.

With equipment from France, television started broadcasting in August 1963 as VoltaVision and it broadcast 4 hours per week during the first few years. Programmes on the service were either made in their country, or imported from France, Germany and the United States. Television broadcasts were suspended in January 1966, but were restored at an unknown date.

During the 2014 uprising, protesters stormed the building of the RTB, seized the technical equipment and stopped broadcasts of the TVB and RB.

On 24 January 2022, during the January 2022 Burkina Faso coup d'état, the mutinous soldiers declared on RTB television that a military junta composed of Paul-Henri Sandaogo Damiba and his "Patriotic Movement for Safeguard and Restoration" had seized control of Burkina Faso.

On the same year, eight months later, (see September 2022 Burkina Faso coup d'état) RTB television stopped broadcasting for hours until a group of soldiers, led by Ibrahim Traoré, announced the fall of Paul-Henri Sandaogo Damiba due to his inability to deal with jihadism in the country, they also announced a curfew, the suspension of all political and civil society activities, of the Constitution of Burkina Faso and closed all air and land borders.

== See also ==
- Media of Burkina Faso
- Adjaratou Lompo
