= Ouaga FM =

Radio station in Burkina Faso

- Burkina Faso
- Frequencies: Ouagadougou: 105.2 MHz; Bobo-Dioulasso: 101.1 MHz

History
- First air date: October 2, 1999

Links
- Website: www.ouagafm-bf.com

Ouaga FM is a radio station in Burkina Faso which is transmitted in the French language on 105.2 MHz FM in the capital town Ouagadougou and in Bobo-Dioulasso, the second city, on 101.1 MHz.

== See also ==
- Media of Burkina Faso
