= Horizon FM =

Radio station in Burkina Faso

Horizon FM is a radio station in Burkina Faso. It is broadcast in the French language on 102.7 or 104.4 FM from the city of Bobo-Dioulasso. It is known for its late night agony uncle show.

== See also ==
- Media of Burkina Faso
