= Minister of Foreign Affairs (Burkina Faso) =

The Minister of Foreign Affairs of the Republic of Burkina Faso (previously known as the Republic of Upper Volta) is a government minister in charge of the Ministry of Foreign Affairs of Burkina Faso, responsible for conducting foreign relations of the country.

The following is a list of foreign ministers of Upper Volta/Burkina Faso since its founding in 1960:

No.	Name (Birth–Death)	Portrait	Tenure
Republic of Upper Volta (1960–1984)
1	Maurice Yaméogo (1921–1993)		1960
2	Lompolo Koné (1921–1974)		1960–1966
3	Sangoulé Lamizana (1916–2005)		1966–1967
4	Malick Zoromé (1935–2012)		1967–1971
5	Joseph Conombo (1917–2008)		1971–1974
6	Saye Zerbo (1932–2013)		1974–1976
7	Alfred Kabore (b. 1939)		1976–1977
8	Moussa Kargougou (1926–1997)		1977–1980
9	Félix Tientarboum (1935–2013)		1980–1982
10	Michel Kafando (b. 1942)		1982–1983
11	Hama Arba Diallo (1939–2014)		1983–1984
Republic of Burkina Faso (1984–present)
12	Basile Guissou (b. 1949)		1984–1986
13	Léandre Bassolé (b. 1946)		1986–1987
14	Jean-Marc Palm (1950–2026)		1987–1989
15	Issou Go		1989
16	Prosper Vokouma (b. 1955)		1989–1991
17	Issa Dominique Konaté (b. 1953)		1991–1992
18	Thomas Sanon (b. 1947)		1992–1994
19	Ablassé Ouedraogo (b. 1953)		1994–1999
20	Youssouf Ouédraogo (1952–2017)		1999–2007
21	Djibril Bassolé (b. 1957)		2007–2008
22	Alain Bédouma Yoda (b. 1951)		2008–2011
(21)	Djibril Bassolé (b. 1957)		2011–2014
(10)	Michel Kafando (b. 1942)		2014–2015
23	Moussa Nébié (b. 1959)		2015
(23)	Moussa Nébié (b. 1959)		2015–2016
24	Alpha Barry (b. 1970)		2016–2020
(24)	Alpha Barry (b. 1970)		2021
25	Rosine Sori-Coulibaly (b. 1958)		2021–2022
26	Olivia Rouamba		2022–2023
27	Karamoko Jean-Marie Traoré (b. 1972)		2023–present

== Sources ==
- Rulers.org – Foreign ministers A–D
