= L'Observateur Paalga =

L'Observateur Paalga (1973–1984, 1991-) is the most widely read newspaper in Burkina Faso. It was created 1973 by Édouard Ouédraogo, but burnt down 1984 by the Thomas Sankara regime as part of control of the media of Burkina Faso, leaving only a government paper. It was refounded in 1991 as L'Observateur Paalga (paalga means "new" in Mooré).
