= Olivia Rouamba =

Burkina Faso politician

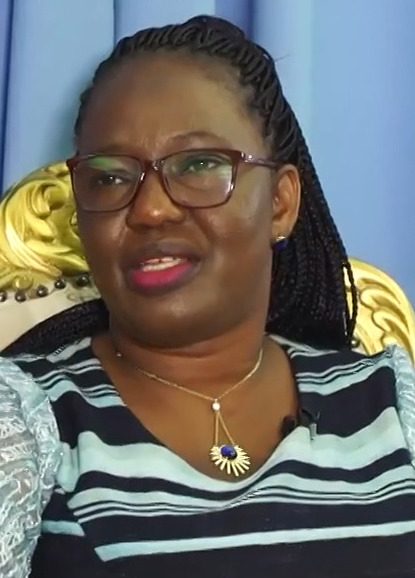

Minister of Foreign Affairs
- In office March 2022 – December 2023
- President: Paul-Henri Sandaogo Damiba; Ibrahim Traoré
- Prime Minister: Albert Ouédraogo; Apollinaire J. Kyélem de Tambèla
- Preceded by: Rosine Sori-Coulibaly
- Succeeded by: Karamoko Jean-Marie Traoré

Personal details
- Occupation: Politician

Olivia Ragnaghnewendé Rouamba is a Burkina Faso politician who was the nation's Minister of Foreign Affairs from March 2022 to December 2023.

== Education ==
Rouamba has a doctorate in international relations.

== Career ==
Rouamba worked Director General of Bilateral Cooperation and was Second Counselor at Burkina Faso's embassy in South Africa. On 15 September 2021 Rouamba was appointed by the Council of Ministers as Burkina Faso's ambassador to Ethiopia, as well as Permanent Representative to the African Union and the United Nations Economic Commission for Africa.

Rouamba was appointed Minister for Foreign Affairs by interim President Paul-Henri Sandaogo Damiba on 5 March 2022 as part of the transitional government following the January coup. She was installed in Ouagadougou on 11 March 2022. In her speech upon taking office, she said "Dear collaborators, I refuse to be traitors, we will refuse to be traitors and we will accomplish this mission with abnegation."

In March and again in April, she said that a three year transition period back to democracy proposed by the military junta was "realistic". In July, she said that the two-year period had been suggested by the nation's junta rather than imposed by ECOWAS "as some are saying on the internet." On 15 July, United Nations Peacebuilding Commission Chair Rahab Fatima met with Rouamba, affirming the ECOWAS timetable and strongly encouraging Burkina Faso to "swiftly implement ... a peaceful and inclusive transition process with respect for human rights, justice and the rule of law."

A decree read on national television announced Rouamba was fired as foreign minister on 17 December 2023 following a "mini-reshuffle" led by Burkinabé president Ibrahim Traoré. She was replaced by Karamoko Jean-Marie Traoré, who was the minister delegate for regional cooperation at the time. Analysts said her sacking came as a surprise, since she was said to be in Traoré's "close circle".
