= Antoine Somdah =

Ambassador Extraordinary and Plenipotentiary of Burkina Faso to the Russian Federation
- In office 27 June 2014 – 30 January 2022
- Succeeded by: Aristide Tapsoba

Personal details
- Born: 12 June 1962 (age 64)
- Education: University of Ouagadougou; Patrice Lumumba University

Antoine Somdah (born 12 June 1962) is a statesman of Burkina Faso and a diplomat. Ambassador Extraordinary and Plenipotentiary of Burkina Faso to the Russian Federation from 2014 to January 2022. He was succeeded by Aristide Tapsoba on 31 January 2024.

== Biography ==
Antoine Somdah was born on June 12, 1962. In 1988 he graduated from the Law School of the University of Ouagadougou and continued his USSR studies. In 1993 he graduated from Peoples' Friendship University, and in 1995 also received a master's degree in international public law there. In the early 1990s, he completed an internship at Moscow City Council and the Moscow Prosecutor's Office.

In 1996, he began his professional career in the Ministry of Foreign Affairs of Burkina Faso. In 2007–2012, he was the First Counselor in the Permanent Mission of Burkina Faso to the United Nations in New York and took part in the 63, 64, 65, 66 and 67 sessions of the UN General Assembly. In 2008–2009, he was a Member of the UN Security Council.

In 2012–2014, he was the Secretary-General of the Institute for High International Studies (IHIS) in Burkina Faso. He is an expert in legal issues in the field of nuclear energy and participated in numerous sessions of the IAEA General Conference.

On January 8, 2014, he was appointed Ambassador Extraordinary and Plenipotentiary of Burkina Faso in Russia. On March 7, he presented copies of his credentials to the Deputy Minister of Foreign Affairs of the Russian Federation, Mikhail Bogdanov, and on June 27 he was introduced to President Vladimir Putin, with whom he discussed the Syrian civil war, the wars in Afghanistan and Iraq, the Iranian nuclear issue and the Russo-Ukrainian War, and also expressed the readiness of the Government of Burkina Faso to intensify scientific, technical and commercial cooperation with Russia. At the moment, the embassy headed by Antoine Somdah is the only diplomatic mission of Burkina Faso in Russia, while Russia does not have any diplomatic or consular missions in Burkina Faso.

He speaks French, Russian and English well, but is less fluent in German.
