= Noellie Marie Béatri Damiba =

Burkinabé diplomat

Béatrice Damiba
- Born: Noellie Marie Béatri Damiba; 31 December 1951 (age 74); Koupéla, Burkina Faso
- Education: University of Strasbourg
- Occupations: Diplomat, journalist

Noellie Marie Béatri Damiba (born 31 December 1951) is a Burkinabé journalist and diplomat from Burkina Faso. Damiba was born in Koupéla. From 1994 to 2003, she served as her country's Ambassador in Rome, Italy and from 2003 to 2008 as the Ambassador in Vienna, Austria.

== Life and work ==
Called Béatrice Damiba, she was born on 31 December 1951 in Koupéla and earned her bachelor's and master's degree in journalism at the University of Strasbourg before beginning her reporting career with the French-language weekly newspaper Carrefour Africain, moving to the daily Sidwaya in 1984.

Beginning in 1983, she held several political responsibilities: press secretary to the Prime Minister in 1983, high commissioner of Bazèga (1984 to 1985), minister of the Environment and Tourism (1985 to 1989), minister of Information and Culture (1989 to 1991), communications advisor to the Presidency (1992 to 1994), before becoming ambassador of Burkina Faso to Italy (1994 to 2003), then to Austria (2003 to 2008).

She became president of the Superior Council of Communication in 2008 and was the first woman to occupy this position.

== Family ==
She is the sister of Pierre Claver Damiba (who was also a minister and then a deputy).

== Selected awards and honors ==
Béatrice Damiba has received of the following distinctions.

- Torch of the Revolution (bronze, silver)
- Officer of Merit of Arts, Letters and Communication of Burkina Faso
- Knight Grand Cross of the Order of Merit of the Italian Republic
- Grand-croix de l'ordre pro Merito Melitensi
- Commander of the National Order of the Lion of Senegal
- Commander of the National Order of Burkina Faso (2005)
- Honorary Diploma in Water and Forestry Engineer of Burkina Faso
- Honorary citizen of the town of Marciano in Italy
- Medal of Honor from the Rotary Club Apia Antica of Rome
- Diploma of honor of the Fiaccola della Carità Movement of Italy

== Diplomatic Posts ==
Diplomatic posts
Preceded by	Ambassador of Burkina Faso to Rome; 1994-2003	Succeeded by
Preceded by Thomas Sanon	Ambassador of Burkina Faso to Austria; 2003-2008	Succeeded by Salifou Diallo
