= Marie Odile Bonkoungou-Balima =

Former Burkinabé minister and ambassador

- Born: December 15, 1961 (age 64); Burkina Faso
- Occupations: Government minister and diplomat
- Known for: Ambassador to Germany

Marie Odile Bonkoungou-Balima born Marie Odile Balima (born December 15, 1961) was her country's Minister for Education for six years and then the Burkinabé ambassador to Germany.

== Life ==
Bonkoungou-Balima was born in Burkina Faso. She studied at the University of Ouagadougou from 1981 to 1985 and graduated with a master's degree in business law.

Having completed other courses in Public Administration at the National School of Administration and Judiciary she went on courses in France and French speaking Canada. She returned to her country and entered the civil service joining the Ministry of Public Service. By 1992 she was Director of that service and in 1998 she became Director of both Public Services but also Institutional Development Services.

In 2000 she joined the board of the École normal supérieure de Koudougou (ENSK) (University of Koudougou).

She was her ministry's member at the Association for the Development of Education in Africa from 2005 to 2011.

On April 1, 1987, she entered the civil service of Burkina Faso: From 1989 to 1990 she was director of career management in the Ministry of Public Service. From 1990 to 1992 she was a researcher and department head in the Ministry of Public Service. From 1992 to 1998 she was Director General of the Public Service. From 1998 to 2001 she was Inspector General of the Ministry of Public Service and Institutional Development Services. She became the Minister for Education in 2005 and remained in that role until 2011.

She was accredited as Ambassador Extraordinary and Plenipotentiary of Burkina Faso on February 24, 2012, in Berlin, July 5, 2013 in Kyiv and February 12, 2014, in Warsaw. Her reception in Berlin was made by Horst Seehofer on his first day of exercising the powers of Germany's Federal President. Whilst she was in Kyiv she also met fellow ex-pats in the country.
