= Le Pays (Burkina Faso) =

Le Pays is a newspaper in Burkina Faso. It was founded in 1991. As of 2013 it has a circulation of 10,000.
