= Youssouf Ouédraogo =

Burkinabé politician

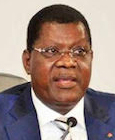

Prime Minister of Burkina Faso
- In office 16 June 1992 – 22 March 1994
- President: Blaise Compaoré
- Preceded by: Thomas Sankara
- Succeeded by: Roch Marc Christian Kaboré

Minister of Foreign Affairs
- In office January 1999 – June 2007
- President: Blaise Compaoré
- Prime Minister: Kadré Désiré Ouédraogo; Paramanga Ernest Yonli

Ambassador of Burkina Faso to Belgium, United Kingdom, Luxembourg, Netherlands and European Union
- In office March 1994 – January 1999
- President: Blaise Compaoré

Special Adviser to the President of African Development Bank
- In office September 2007 – 18 November 2017
- President: Donald Kaberuka

President of Social and Economic Council
- In office April 1989 – May 1992

Minister of Planning and Cooperation
- In office October 1987 – April 1989
- President: Blaise Compaoré
- Prime Minister: Unoccupied position

Minister of Planning and Popular Development
- In office August 1984 – October 1987
- President: Thomas Sankara
- Prime Minister: Unoccupied position

Personal details
- Born: 25 December 1952 Tikaré, Upper Volta
- Died: 18 November 2017 (aged 64) Abidjan, Ivory Coast

Youssouf Ouédraogo (25 December 1952 – 18 November 2017) was a Burkinabé politician. In 1992 he became the first prime minister of Burkina Faso since 1983, serving from 16 June 1992 to 22 March 1994. Ouédraogo, a member of the ruling Congress for Democracy and Progress (CDP), later served as Minister of State for Foreign Affairs from January 1999 to June 2007.

== Biography ==
Ouédraogo was born in Tikaré, in Bam Province. Under Thomas Sankara, Ouédraogo was appointed to the government as Minister of Planning and Popular Development on 31 August 1984, remaining in that position for three years. Shortly after Sankara was assassinated in October 1987, Ouédraogo became Minister for the Plan and Cooperation under Blaise Compaoré. He left that position on 25 April 1989 and became President of the Economic and Social Council, in which position he served until he was elected to the National Assembly as a deputy from Bam in the May 1992 parliamentary election. He was appointed as prime minister by Compaoré on 16 June 1992.

The CFA franc was devaluated in January 1994, and this was followed by controversy. Ouédraogo signed an agreement with trade unions to raise salaries on 12 March 1994, but the agreement fell through and Ouédraogo resigned a few days later. He then served as Ambassador to Belgium, the Netherlands, the United Kingdom, Luxembourg and the European Union before being appointed as Minister of State for Foreign Affairs in January 1999.

Ouédraogo was elected to the National Assembly again in the 2007 parliamentary election as a candidate of the CDP from Bam Province. In the government of Prime Minister Tertius Zongo, which was appointed on 10 June 2007, he was replaced as Foreign Minister by Djibrill Bassolé. He subsequently became special adviser to the president of the African Development Bank.

== Political career ==
He obtained a degree in marketing at the Universities of Dijon, Clermont-Ferrand and Lyon III (France). He taught at the University of Ouagadougou from 1982.

Under Thomas Sankara (President of Burkina Faso from 1983 to 1987), Ouédraogo was appointed to the government as Minister of Planning and Popular Development on 31 August 1984, remaining in that position for three years. Shortly after Sankara was assassinated in October 1987, Ouédraogo became Minister for the Plan and Cooperation under Blaise Compaoré. He left that position on 25 April 1989 and became president of the Economic and Social Council, in which position he served until he was elected to the National Assembly as a deputy from Bam in the May 1992 parliamentary election. He was appointed as prime minister by Compaoré on 16 June 1992.

He promoted reforms favorable to the private sector. He entered into negotiations with the IMF and the World Bank to reach agreements on structural adjustment. The CFA franc was devaluated in January 1994, and this was followed by controversy. Ouédraogo signed an agreement with trade unions to raise salaries on 12 March 1994, but the agreement fell through and Ouédraogo resigned a few days later.

== Diplomacy ==
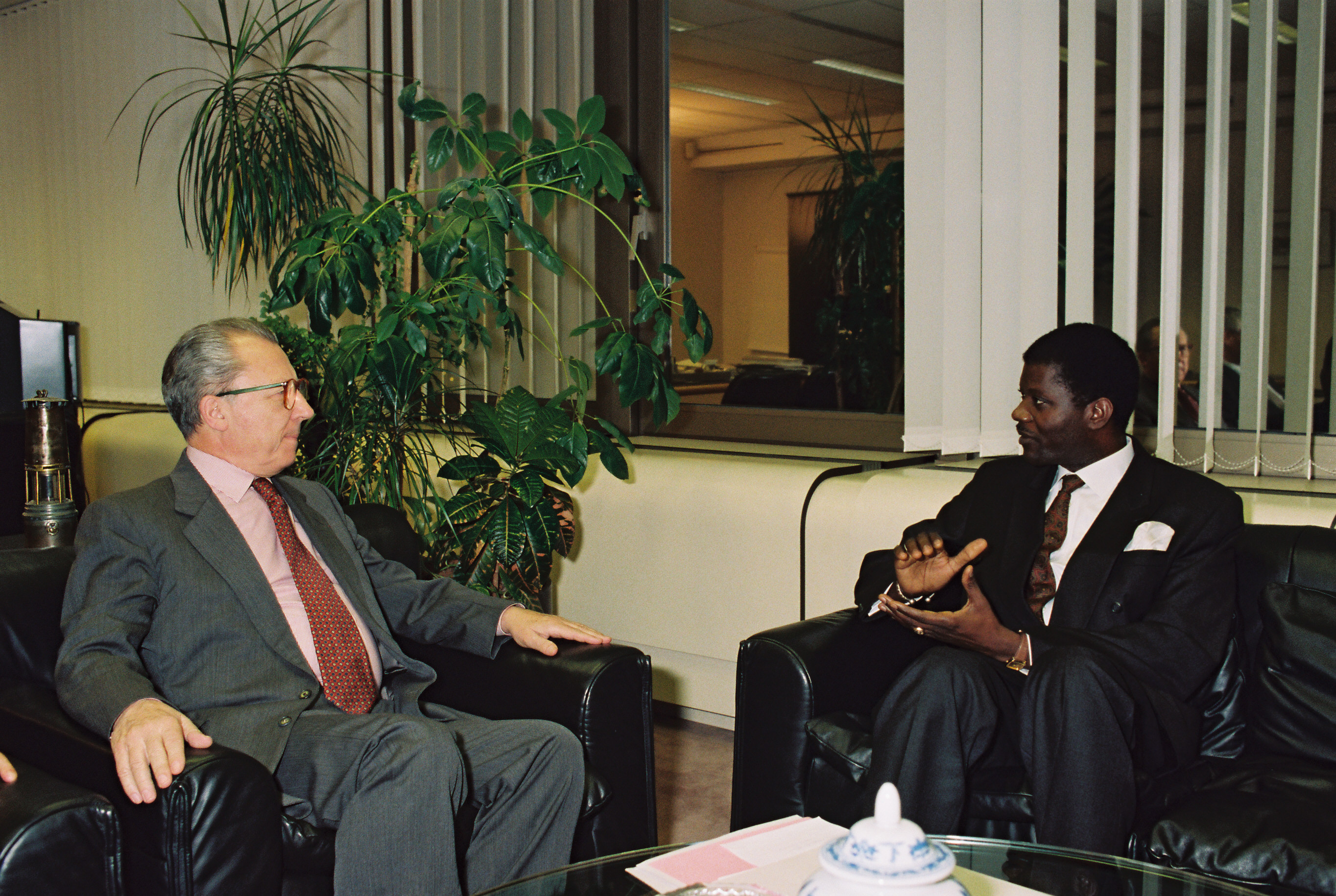
Ouédraogo meeting with Jacques Delors in 1994

He also had a diplomatic career, serving as an Ambassador to Belgium, the Netherlands, the United Kingdom, Luxembourg and the European Union before being appointed as Minister of State for Foreign Affairs in January 1999.

Chairman of the African Group of Ambassadors Committee – Caribbean – Pacific (ACP), he is one of the main negotiators in front of the European Commission at the renewal of the Fourth Geneva Convention governing the ACP-EU Partnership for the period 1995–1999.

Recalled to Burkina Faso in January 1999, he was appointed as Minister of Foreign Affairs, a post he held until 2007.

He represented Africa at the launch in March 1999 of the US – Africa Partnership for 21st century, with President Bill Clinton. At this time the Burkina Faso held the presidency of the Organization of African Unity (OAU). He strongly supported the preferential agreement proposed by the United States to promote trade relations with Africa (AGOA) and the creation of the Millennium Challenge Corporation. He also organized Burkina second ministerial meeting implementation of the Africa – European Union (2002), and the tenth Francophonie Summit (2004).

Ouédraogo was elected to the National Assembly again in the 2007 parliamentary election as a candidate of the CDP from Bam Province. In the government of Prime Minister Tertius Zongo, which was appointed on 10 June 2007, he was replaced as Foreign Minister by Djibrill Bassolé.

== International organisations ==
In September 2007, he became Special Adviser to the President of the African Development Bank. He was in charge of political and diplomatic issues. He was appointed to that position to deepen and/or expand the partnership between the Bank and its Member States, Regional Economic Communities and international institutions. He also defended a stronger partnership between the Maghreb and Sub-Saharan Africa.

In 2016, he was elected associated member of the Royal Academies for Science and Arts of Belgium. His induction took place on 28 May during an official ceremony at the Academy Palace of Belgium where he held a speech on behalf of all new members.

== Death ==
Ouédraogo died on 18 November 2017 at the age of 64.

== Decorations ==
- Silver Medal (today, Command-officer) of Burkina Faso Revolution's Torch (4 August 1985)
- Title of Grand Officer of the National Order of Burkina Faso (11 December 1994)
- Commander-in-chief in the Order of Mono of Togo (1 March 2008)
- Title of Grand Officer of the Order of the Crown of Belgium (22 July 2005)
