= List of foreign ministers in 2025 =

This is a list of foreign ministers in 2025.

== Africa ==
- Algeria – Ahmed Attaf (2023–present)
- Angola – Tete António (2020–present)
- Benin – Shegun Adjadi Bakari (2023–present)
- Botswana – Phenyo Butale (2024–present)
- Burkina Faso – Karamoko Jean-Marie Traoré (2023–present)
- Burundi – Albert Shingiro (2020–present)
- Cameroon – Lejeune Mbella Mbella (2015–present)
- Cabo Verde – Rui Alberto de Figueiredo Soares (2021–present)
- Central African Republic – Sylvie Baïpo-Temon (2018–present)
- Chad –
  1. Abderaman Koulamallah (2024–2025)
  2. Abdoulaye Sabre Fadoul (2025–present)
- Comoros – Dhoihir Dhoulkamal (2020–present)
- Democratic Republic of the Congo – Thérèse Kayikwamba Wagner (2024–present)
- Republic of the Congo – Jean-Claude Gakosso (2015–present)
- Djibouti –
  1. Mahamoud Ali Youssouf (2005–2025)
  2. Abdoulkader Houssein Omar (2025–present)
- Egypt – Badr Abdelatty (2024–present)
- Equatorial Guinea – Simeón Oyono Esono Angüe (2018–present)
- Eritrea – Osman Saleh (2007–present)
- Eswatini – Pholile Shakantu (2023–present)
- Ethiopia – Gedion Timotheos (2024–present)
- Gabon – Régis Onanga Ndiaye (2023–present)
- Gambia – Mamadou Tangara (2018–present)
- Ghana –
  1. Shirley Ayorkor Botchwey (2017–2025)
  2. Samuel Okudzeto Ablakwa (2025–present)
- Guinea – Morissanda Kouyaté (2021–present)
- Guinea-Bissau – Carlos Pinto Pereira (2023–present)
- Ivory Coast – Kacou Houadja Léon Adom (2023–present)
- Kenya – Musalia Mudavadi (2023–present)
- Lesotho – Mpotjoane Lejone (2022–present)
- Liberia – Sara Beysolow Nyanti (2024–present)
- Libya – Abdul Hamid Dbeibeh, Acting (2023–present)
- Madagascar – Rasata Rafaravavitafika (2024–present)
- Malawi – Nancy Tembo (2022–present)
- Mali – Abdoulaye Diop (2021–present)
- Mauritania – Mohamed Salem Ould Merzoug (2022–present)
- Mauritius – Ritish Ramful (2024–present)
- Morocco – Nasser Bourita (2017–present)
- Mozambique –
  1. Verónica Macamo (2020–2025)
  2. Maria Manuela Lucas (2025–present)
- Namibia –
  1. Peya Mushelenga (2024–2025)
  2. Selma Ashipala-Musavyi (2025–present)
- Niger – Bakary Yaou Sangaré (2023–present)
- Nigeria – Yusuf Tuggar (2023–present)
- Rwanda – Olivier Nduhungirehe (2024–present)
- Sahrawi Republic –
  1. Mohamed Sidati (2023–2025)
  2. Mohamed Yeslem Beissat (2025–present)
- São Tomé and Príncipe – Gareth Guadalupe (2023–present)
- Senegal – Yassine Fall (2024–present)
- Seychelles –
  1. Sylvestre Radegonde (2020–2025)
  2. Barry Faure (2025–present)
- Sierra Leone – Timothy Kabba (2023–present)
- Somalia –
  1. Ahmed Moalim Fiqi (2023–2025)
  2. Abdisalam Abdi Ali (2025–present)
- Somaliland – Abdirahman Dahir Adam Bakal (2024–present)
- South Africa – Ronald Lamola (2024–present)
- South Sudan –
  1. Ramadan Mohamed Abdallah Goc (2024–2025)
  2. Simaya Kumba (2025–present)
- Sudan –
  1. Ali Yousif (2024–2025)
  2. Omar Mohammed Ahmed Siddiq (2025–present)
- Tanzania – Mahmoud Thabit Kombo (2024–present)
- Togo – Robert Dussey (2015–present)
- Tunisia – Mohamed Ali Nafti (2024–present)
- Uganda – Jeje Odongo (2021–present)
- Zambia – Mulambo Haimbe (2023–present)
- Zimbabwe – Amon Murwira (2024–present)

== Asia ==
- Abkhazia – Sergei Shamba (2024–present)
- Afghanistan – Amir Khan Muttaqi, Acting (2021–present)
- Armenia – Ararat Mirzoyan (2021–present)
- Azerbaijan – Jeyhun Bayramov (2020–present)
- Bahrain – Abdullatif bin Rashid Al Zayani (2020–present)
- Bangladesh – Md. Touhid Hossain, Caretaker (2024–present)
- Bhutan – D. N. Dhungyel (2024–present)
- Brunei –
  1. Hassanal Bolkiah (2015–present)
  2. Erywan Yusof, Second Minister (2018–present)
- Cambodia – Prak Sokhonn (2024–present)
- China – Wang Yi (2023–present)
- Georgia – Maka Bochorishvili (2024–present)
- India – S. Jaishankar (2019–present)
- Indonesia – Sugiono (2024–present)
- Iran – Abbas Araghchi (2024–present)
- Iraq – Fuad Hussein (2020–present)
- Israel – Gideon Sa'ar (2024–present)
- Japan –
  1. Takeshi Iwaya (2024–2025)
  2. Toshimitsu Motegi (2025–present)
- Jordan – Ayman Safadi (2017–present)
- Kazakhstan – Murat Nurtileu (2023–present)
- North Korea – Choe Son-hui (2022–present)
- South Korea –
  1. Cho Tae-yul (2024–2025)
  2. Cho Hyun (2025–present)
- Kuwait – Abdullah Ali Al-Yahya (2024–present)
- Kyrgyzstan – Jeenbek Kulubayev (2022–present)
- Laos – Thongsavanh Phomvihane (2024–present)
- Lebanon –
  1. Abdallah Bou Habib (2021–2025)
  2. Youssef Rajji (2025–present)
- Malaysia – Mohamad Hasan (2023–present)
- Maldives – Abdulla Khaleel (2024–present)
- Mongolia – Battsetseg Batmunkh (2021–present)
- Myanmar – Than Swe (2023–present)
- Nepal – Shishir Khanal (2026–present)
- Oman – Badr bin Hamad Al Busaidi (2020–present)
- Pakistan – Ishaq Dar (2024–present)
- Palestine –
  1. Mohammad Mustafa (2024–2025)
  2. Varsen Aghabekian (2025–present)
- Philippines –
  1. Enrique Manalo (2022–2025)
  2. Tess Lazaro (2025–present)
- Qatar – Mohammed bin Abdulrahman bin Jassim Al Thani (2016–present)
- Saudi Arabia – Faisal bin Farhan Al Saud (2019–present)
- Singapore – Vivian Balakrishnan (2015–present)
- South Ossetia – Akhsar Dzhioev (2022–present)
- Sri Lanka – Vijitha Herath (2024–present)
- Syria – Asaad al-Shaibani (2024–present)
- Taiwan (Republic of China) – Lin Chia-lung (2024–present)
- Tajikistan – Sirojiddin Muhriddin (2013–present)
- Thailand –
  1. Maris Sangiampongsa (2024–2025)
  2. Sihasak Phuangketkeow (2025–present)
- Timor-Leste (East Timor) – Bendito Freitas (2023–present)
- Turkey – Hakan Fidan (2023–present)
- Turkmenistan – Raşit Meredow (2001–present)
- United Arab Emirates – Abdullah bin Zayed Al Nahyan (2006–present)
- Uzbekistan – Bakhtiyor Saidov (2022–present)
- Vietnam –
  1. Bùi Thanh Sơn (2021–2025)
  2. Lê Hoài Trung (2025–present)
- Yemen – Shaya Mohsin al-Zindani (2024–present)

== Europe ==
- Albania – Igli Hasani (2023–present)
- Andorra – Imma Tor Faus (2023–present)
- Austria –
  1. Alexander Schallenberg (2021–2025)
  2. Beate Meinl-Reisinger (2025–present)
- Belarus – Maxim Ryzhenkov (2024–present)
- Belgium –
  1. Bernard Quintin (2024–2025)
  2. Maxime Prévot (2025–present)
- Bosnia and Herzegovina – Elmedin Konaković (2023–present)
- Bulgaria –
  1. Ivan Kondov (2024–2025)
  2. Georg Georgiev (2025–present)
- Croatia – Gordan Grlić-Radman (2019–present)
- Czech Republic – Jan Lipavský (2021–present)
- Denmark – Lars Løkke Rasmussen (2022–present)
- Estonia – Margus Tsahkna (2023–present)
- Finland – Elina Valtonen (2023–present)
- France – Jean-Noël Barrot (2024–present)
- Germany –
  1. Annalena Baerbock (2021–2025)
  2. Johann Wadephul (2025–present)
- Greece – Giorgos Gerapetritis (2023–present)
- Hungary – Péter Szijjártó (2014–present)
- Iceland – Þorgerður Katrín Gunnarsdóttir (2024–present)
- Ireland –
  1. Micheál Martin (2022–2025)
  2. Simon Harris (2025–present)
- Italy – Antonio Tajani (2022–present)
- Kosovo – Donika Gërvalla-Schwarz (2021–present)
- Latvia – Baiba Braže (2024–present)
- Liechtenstein –
  1. Dominique Hasler (2021–2025)
  2. Sabine Monauni (2025–present)
- Lithuania – Kęstutis Budrys (2024–present)
- Luxembourg – Xavier Bettel (2023–present)
- Malta – Ian Borg (2022–present)
- Moldova – Mihai Popșoi (2024–present)
- Monaco – Isabelle Berro-Amadeï (2022–present)
- Montenegro – Filip Ivanović (2023–present)
- Netherlands –
  - Caspar Veldkamp (2024–2025)
  - David van Weel (2025–present)
- North Macedonia – Timčo Mucunski (2024–present)
- Northern Cyprus – Tahsin Ertuğruloğlu (2022–present)
- Norway – Espen Barth Eide (2023–present)
- Poland – Radosław Sikorski (2023–present)
- Portugal – Paulo Rangel (2024–present)
- Romania – Emil Hurezeanu (2024–present)
- Russia – Sergey Lavrov (2004–present)
- San Marino – Luca Beccari (2020–present)
- Serbia – Marko Đurić (2024–present)
- Slovakia – Juraj Blanár (2023–present)
- Slovenia – Tanja Fajon (2022–present)
- Spain – José Manuel Albares (2021–present)
  - Catalonia – Jaume Duch (2024–present)
- Sweden – Maria Malmer Stenergard (2024–present)
- Switzerland – Ignazio Cassis (2017–present)
- Transnistria – Vitaly Ignatiev (2015–present)
- Ukraine – Andrii Sybiha (2024–present)
- United Kingdom –
  1. David Lammy (2024–2025)
  2. Yvette Cooper (2025–present)
  - Scotland – Angus Robertson (2021–present)
- Vatican City – Archbishop Paul Gallagher (2014–present)

== North America and the Caribbean ==
- Antigua and Barbuda – Paul Chet Greene (2018–present)
- The Bahamas – Fred Mitchell (2021–present)
- Barbados – Kerrie Symmonds (2022–present)
- Belize – Francis Fonseca (2024–present)
- Canada –
  1. Mélanie Joly (2021–2025)
  2. Anita Anand (2025–present)
  - Quebec – Martine Biron (2022–present)
- Costa Rica – Arnoldo André Tinoco (2022–present)
- Cuba – Bruno Rodríguez Parrilla (2009–present)
- Dominica – Vince Henderson (2022–present)
- Dominican Republic – Roberto Álvarez (2020–present)
- El Salvador – Alexandra Hill Tinoco (2019–present)
- Greenland – Vivian Motzfeldt (2022–present)
- Grenada – Joseph Andall (2022–present)
- Guatemala – Carlos Ramiro Martínez (2024–present)
- Haiti – Jean-Victor Harvel Jean-Baptiste (2024–present)
- Honduras – Eduardo Enrique Reina (2022–present)
- Jamaica – Kamina Johnson Smith (2016–present)
- Mexico – Juan Ramón de la Fuente (2024–present)
- Nicaragua –
  1. Valdrack Jaentschke (2024–2025)
  2. Denis Moncada Colindres and Valdrack Jaentschke (2025–present)
- Panama – Javier Martínez-Acha (2024–present)
- Puerto Rico –
  1. Omar J. Marrero (2021–2025)
  2. Verónica Ferraiuoli, Acting (2025)
  3. Narel Colón, Acting (2025)
  4. Rosachely Rivera, (2025–present)
- Saint Kitts and Nevis – Denzil Douglas (2022–present)
- Saint Lucia – Alva Baptiste (2021–present)
- Saint Vincent and the Grenadines – Keisal Peters (2022–present)
- Trinidad and Tobago –
  1. Amery Browne (2020–2025)
  2. Sean Sobers (2025–present)
- United States –
  1. Antony Blinken (2021–2025)
  2. Lisa D. Kenna, Acting (2025)
  3. Marco Rubio (2025–present)

== Oceania ==
- Australia – Penny Wong (2022–present)
- Cook Islands – Mark Brown (2013–present)
- Fiji – Sitiveni Rabuka (2022–present)
- French Polynesia – Moetai Brotherson (2023–present)
- Kiribati – Taneti Maamau (2016–present)
- Marshall Islands – Kalani Kaneko (2024–present)
- Federated States of Micronesia – Lorin S. Robert (2023–present)
- Nauru – Lionel Aingimea (2023–present)
- New Zealand – Winston Peters (2023–present)
- Niue – Dalton Tagelagi (2020–present)
- Palau – Gustav Aitaro (2021–present)
- Papua New Guinea – Justin Tkatchenko (2024–present)
- Samoa – Fiamē Naomi Mataʻafa (2021–present)
- Solomon Islands – Peter Shannel Agovaka (2024–present)
- Tokelau –
  1. Alapati Tavite (2024–2025)
  2. Esera Fofō Tuisano (2025–present)
- Tonga –
  1. Samiu Vaipulu, Acting (2024–2025)
  2. Tupoutoʻa ʻUlukalala (2025–present)
- Tuvalu – Paulson Panapa (2024–present)
- Vanuatu –
  1. Matai Seremaiah (2023–2025)
  2. Marc Ati (2025–present)

== South America ==
- Argentina – Gerardo Werthein (2024–present)
- Bolivia – Celinda Sosa Lunda (2023–present)
- Brazil – Mauro Vieira (2023–present)
- Chile – Alberto van Klaveren (2023–2026)
- Colombia –
  1. Luis Gilberto Murillo (2024–2025)
  2. Laura Sarabia (2025–present)
- Ecuador – Gabriela Sommerfeld (2023–present)
- Guyana – Hugh Todd (2020–present)
- Paraguay – Rubén Ramírez Lezcano (2023–present)
- Peru –
  1. Elmer Schialer (2024–2025)
  2. Hugo de Zela (2025–2026)
- Suriname – Albert Ramdin (2020–present)
- Uruguay –
  1. Omar Paganini (2023–2025)
  2. Mario Lubetkin (2025–present)
- Venezuela – Yván Gil (2023–present)

== See also ==
- List of current foreign ministers
