= List of foreign ministers in 2024 =

This is a list of foreign ministers in 2024.

== Africa ==
- Algeria – Ahmed Attaf (2023–present)
- Angola – Tete António (2020–present)
- Benin – Shegun Adjadi Bakari (2023–present)
- Botswana –
  1. Lemogang Kwape (2020–2024)
  2. Phenyo Butale (2024–present)
- Burkina Faso – Karamoko Jean-Marie Traoré (2023–present)
- Burundi – Albert Shingiro (2020–present)
- Cameroon – Lejeune Mbella Mbella (2015–present)
- Cabo Verde – Rui Alberto de Figueiredo Soares (2021–present)
- Central African Republic – Sylvie Baïpo-Temon (2018–present)
- Chad –
  1. Mahamat Saleh Annadif (2022–2024)
  2. Abderaman Koulamallah (2024–2025)
- Comoros – Dhoihir Dhoulkamal (2020–present)
- Democratic Republic of the Congo –
  1. Christophe Lutundula (2021–2024)
  2. Thérèse Kayikwamba Wagner (2024–present)
- Republic of the Congo – Jean-Claude Gakosso (2015–present)
- Djibouti – Mahamoud Ali Youssouf (2005–present)
- Egypt –
  1. Sameh Shoukry (2014–2024)
  2. Badr Abdelatty (2024–present)
- Equatorial Guinea – Simeón Oyono Esono Angüe (2018–present)
- Eritrea – Osman Saleh (2007–present)
- Eswatini – Pholile Shakantu (2023–present)
- Ethiopia –
  1. Demeke Mekonnen (2020–2024)
  2. Taye Atske Selassie (2024)
  3. Gedion Timotheos (2024–present)
- Gabon – Régis Onanga Ndiaye (2023–present)
- Gambia – Mamadou Tangara (2018–present)
- Ghana – Shirley Ayorkor Botchwey (2017–2025)
- Guinea – Morissanda Kouyaté (2021–present)
- Guinea-Bissau – Carlos Pinto Pereira (2023–present)
- Ivory Coast – Kacou Houadja Léon Adom (2023–present)
- Kenya – Musalia Mudavadi (2023–present)
- Lesotho – Mpotjoane Lejone (2022–present)
- Liberia –
  1. Dee-Maxwell Saah Kemayah, Sr. (2020–2024)
  2. Sara Beysolow Nyanti (2024–present)
- Libya – Abdul Hamid Dbeibeh, Acting (2023–present)
- Madagascar – Rasata Rafaravavitafika (2024–present)
- Malawi – Nancy Tembo (2022–present)
- Mali – Abdoulaye Diop (2021–present)
- Mauritania – Mohamed Salem Ould Merzoug (2022–present)
- Mauritius –
  1. Maneesh Gobin (2023–2024)
  2. Ritish Ramful (2024–present)
- Morocco – Nasser Bourita (2017–present)
- Mozambique – Verónica Macamo (2020–2025)
- Namibia –
  1. Netumbo Nandi-Ndaitwah (2012–2024)
  2. Peya Mushelenga (2024–2025)
- Niger – Bakary Yaou Sangaré (2023–present)
- Nigeria – Yusuf Tuggar (2023–present)
- Rwanda –
  1. Vincent Biruta (2019–2024)
  2. Olivier Nduhungirehe (2024–present)
- Sahrawi Republic – Mohamed Sidati (2023–2025)
- São Tomé and Príncipe – Gareth Guadalupe (2023–present)
- Senegal –
  1. Ismaïla Madior Fall (2023–2024)
  2. Mankeur Ndiaye (2024)
  3. Yassine Fall (2024–present)
- Seychelles – Sylvestre Radegonde (2020–2025)
- Sierra Leone – Timothy Kabba (2023–present)
- Somalia – Ahmed Moalim Fiqi (2023–2025)
- Somaliland –
  1. Essa Kayd (2020–2024)
  2. Abdirahman Dahir Adam Bakal (2024–present)
- South Africa –
  1. Naledi Pandor (2019–2024)
  2. Ronald Lamola (2024–present)
- South Sudan –
  1. James Pitia Morgan (2023–2024)
  2. Ramadan Mohamed Abdallah Goc (2024–2025)
- Sudan –
  1. Ali Al-Sadiq Ali, Acting (2022–2024)
  2. Hussein Awad Ali (2024)
  3. Ali Yousif (2024–2025)
- Tanzania –
  1. January Makamba (2023–2024)
  2. Mahmoud Thabit Kombo (2024–present)
- Togo – Robert Dussey (2015–present)
- Tunisia –
  1. Nabil Ammar (2023–2024)
  2. Mohamed Ali Nafti (2024–present)
- Uganda – Jeje Odongo (2021–present)
- Zambia – Mulambo Haimbe (2023–present)
- Zimbabwe –
  1. Frederick Shava (2021–2024)
  2. Amon Murwira (2024–present)

== Asia ==
- Abkhazia –
  1. Inal Ardzinba (2021–2024)
  2. Irakli Tuzhba (2024)
  3. Sergei Shamba (2024–present)
- Afghanistan – Amir Khan Muttaqi, Acting (2021–present)
- Armenia – Ararat Mirzoyan (2021–present)
- Artsakh – Sergey Ghazaryan (2023–2024)
- Azerbaijan – Jeyhun Bayramov (2020–present)
- Bahrain – Abdullatif bin Rashid Al Zayani (2020–present)
- Bangladesh –
  1. Hasan Mahmud (2024)
  2. Md. Touhid Hossain, Caretaker (2024–present)
- Bhutan –
  1. Chewang Rinzin, Caretaker (2023–2024)
  2. D. N. Dhungyel (2024–present)
- Brunei –
  1. Hassanal Bolkiah (2015–present)
  2. Erywan Yusof, Second Minister (2018–present)
- Cambodia –
  1. Sok Chenda Sophea (2023–2024)
  2. Prak Sokhonn (2024–present)
- China – Wang Yi (2023–present)
- Georgia –
  1. Ilia Darchiashvili (2022–2024)
  2. Maka Bochorishvili (2024–present)
- India – S. Jaishankar (2019–present)
- Indonesia –
  1. Retno Marsudi (2014–2024)
  2. Sugiono (2024–present)
- Iran –
  1. Hossein Amir-Abdollahian (2021–2024)
  2. Ali Bagheri, Acting (2024)
  3. Abbas Araghchi (2024–present)
- Iraq – Fuad Hussein (2020–present)
- Israel –
  1. Eli Cohen (2022–2024)
  2. Israel Katz (2024)
  3. Gideon Sa'ar (2024–present)
- Japan –
  1. Yōko Kamikawa (2023–2024)
  2. Takeshi Iwaya (2024–2025)
- Jordan – Ayman Safadi (2017–present)
- Kazakhstan – Murat Nurtileu (2023–present)
- North Korea – Choe Son-hui (2022–present)
- South Korea –
  1. Park Jin (2022–2024)
  2. Cho Tae-yul (2024–2025)
- Kuwait –
  1. Salem Abdullah Al-Jaber Al-Sabah (2022–2024)
  2. Abdullah Ali Al-Yahya (2024–present)
- Kyrgyzstan – Jeenbek Kulubayev (2022–present)
- Laos – Saleumxay Kommasith (2016–2024)
- Lebanon – Abdallah Bou Habib (2021–2025)
- Malaysia – Mohamad Hasan (2023–present)
- Maldives –
  1. Moosa Zameer (2023–2024)
  2. Abdulla Khaleel (2024–present)
- Mongolia – Battsetseg Batmunkh (2021–present)
- Myanmar – Than Swe (2023–present)
- Nepal –
  1. Narayan Prakash Saud (2023–2024)
  2. Narayan Kaji Shrestha (2024)
  3. Arzu Rana Deuba (2024–present)
- Oman – Badr bin Hamad Al Busaidi (2020–present)
- Pakistan –
  1. Jalil Abbas Jilani, Caretaker (2023–2024)
  2. Ishaq Dar (2024–present)
- Palestine –
  1. Riyad al-Maliki (2007–2024)
  2. Mohammad Mustafa (2024–2025)
- Philippines – Enrique Manalo (2022–2025)
- Qatar – Mohammed bin Abdulrahman bin Jassim Al Thani (2016–present)
- Saudi Arabia – Faisal bin Farhan Al Saud (2019–present)
- Singapore – Vivian Balakrishnan (2015–present)
- South Ossetia – Akhsar Dzhioev (2022–present)
- Sri Lanka –
  1. Ali Sabry (2022–2024)
  2. Vijitha Herath (2024–present)
- /Syria –
  1. Faisal Mekdad (2020–2024)
  2. Bassam al-Sabbagh (2024)
  3. Asaad al-Shaibani (2024–present)
- Taiwan (Republic of China) –
  1. Joseph Wu (2018–2024)
  2. Lin Chia-lung (2024–present)
- Tajikistan – Sirojiddin Muhriddin (2013–present)
- Thailand –
  1. Parnpree Bahiddha-nukara (2023–2024)
  2. Maris Sangiampongsa (2024–present)
- Timor-Leste (East Timor) – Bendito Freitas (2023–present)
- Turkey – Hakan Fidan (2023–present)
- Turkmenistan – Raşit Meredow (2001–present)
- United Arab Emirates – Abdullah bin Zayed Al Nahyan (2006–present)
- Uzbekistan – Bakhtiyor Saidov (2022–present)
- Vietnam – Bùi Thanh Sơn (2021–present)
- Yemen –
  1. Ahmad Awad bin Mubarak (2020–2024)
  2. Shaya Mohsin al-Zindani (2024–present)

== Europe ==
- Albania – Igli Hasani (2023–present)
- Andorra – Imma Tor Faus (2023–present)
- Austria – Alexander Schallenberg (2021–2025)
- Belarus –
  1. Sergei Aleinik (2022–2024)
  2. Maxim Ryzhenkov (2024–present)
- Belgium –
  1. Hadja Lahbib (2022–2024)
  2. Bernard Quintin (2024–2025)
- Bosnia and Herzegovina – Elmedin Konaković (2023–present)
- Bulgaria –
  1. Mariya Gabriel (2023–2024)
  2. Stefan Dimitrov (2024)
  3. Dimitar Glavchev (2024)
  4. Ivan Kondov (2024–2025)
- Croatia – Gordan Grlić-Radman (2019–present)
- Czech Republic – Jan Lipavský (2021–present)
- Denmark – Lars Løkke Rasmussen (2022–present)
- Estonia – Margus Tsahkna (2023–present)
- Finland – Elina Valtonen (2023–present)
- France –
  1. Catherine Colonna (2022–2024)
  2. Stéphane Séjourné (2024)
  3. Jean-Noël Barrot (2024–present)
- Germany – Annalena Baerbock (2021–2025)
- Greece – Giorgos Gerapetritis (2023–present)
- Hungary – Péter Szijjártó (2014–present)
- Iceland –
  1. Bjarni Benediktsson (2023–2024)
  2. Þórdís Kolbrún R. Gylfadóttir (2024)
  3. Þorgerður Katrín Gunnarsdóttir (2024–present)
- Ireland – Micheál Martin (2022–2025)
- Italy – Antonio Tajani (2022–present)
- Kosovo – Donika Gërvalla-Schwarz (2021–present)
- Latvia –
  1. Krišjānis Kariņš (2023–2024)
  2. Baiba Braže (2024–present)
- Liechtenstein – Dominique Hasler (2021–2025)
- Lithuania –
  1. Gabrielius Landsbergis (2020–2024)
  2. Kęstutis Budrys (2024–present)
- Luxembourg – Xavier Bettel (2023–present)
- Malta – Ian Borg (2022–present)
- Moldova –
  1. Nicu Popescu (2021–2024)
  2. Mihai Popșoi (2024–present)
- Monaco – Isabelle Berro-Amadeï (2022–present)
- Montenegro – Filip Ivanović (2023–present)
- Netherlands –
  1. Hanke Bruins Slot (2023–2024)
  2. Caspar Veldkamp (2024–2025)
- North Macedonia –
  1. Bujar Osmani (2020–2024)
  2. Timčo Mucunski (2024–present)
- Northern Cyprus – Tahsin Ertuğruloğlu (2022–present)
- Norway – Espen Barth Eide (2023–present)
- Poland – Radosław Sikorski (2023–present)
- Portugal –
  1. João Gomes Cravinho (2022–2024)
  2. Paulo Rangel (2024–present)
- Romania –
  1. Luminița Odobescu (2023–2024)
  2. Emil Hurezeanu (2024–present)
- Russia – Sergey Lavrov (2004–present)
- San Marino – Luca Beccari (2020–present)
- Serbia –
  1. Ivica Dačić (2022–2024)
  2. Marko Đurić (2024–present)
- Slovakia – Juraj Blanár (2023–present)
- Slovenia – Tanja Fajon (2022–present)
- Spain – José Manuel Albares (2021–present)
  - Catalonia –
    1. Meritxell Serret (2022–2024)
    2. Jaume Duch (2024–present)
- Sweden –
  1. Tobias Billström (2022–2024)
  2. Maria Malmer Stenergard (2024–present)
- Switzerland – Ignazio Cassis (2017–present)
- Transnistria – Vitaly Ignatiev (2015–present)
- Ukraine –
  1. Dmytro Kuleba (2020–2024)
  2. Andrii Sybiha (2024–present)
- United Kingdom –
  1. David Cameron (2023–2024)
  2. David Lammy (2024–2025)
  - Scotland – Angus Robertson (2021–present)
- Vatican City – Archbishop Paul Gallagher (2014–present)

== North America and the Caribbean ==
- Antigua and Barbuda – Paul Chet Greene (2018–present)
- The Bahamas – Fred Mitchell (2021–present)
- Barbados – Kerrie Symmonds (2022–present)
- Belize – Francis Fonseca (2024–present)
- Canada – Mélanie Joly (2021–2025)
  - Quebec – Martine Biron (2022–present)
- Costa Rica – Arnoldo André Tinoco (2022–present)
- Cuba – Bruno Rodríguez Parrilla (2009–present)
- Dominica – Vince Henderson (2022–present)
- Dominican Republic – Roberto Álvarez (2020–present)
- El Salvador – Alexandra Hill Tinoco (2019–present)
- Greenland – Vivian Motzfeldt (2022–present)
- Grenada – Joseph Andall (2022–present)
- Guatemala –
  - Mario Búcaro (2022–2024)
  - Carlos Ramiro Martínez (2024–present)
- Haiti –
  - Jean Victor Généus (2021–2024)
  - Dominique Dupuy (2024)
  - Jean-Victor Harvel Jean-Baptiste (2024–present)
- Honduras – Eduardo Enrique Reina (2022–present)
- Jamaica – Kamina Johnson Smith (2016–present)
- Mexico –
  1. Alicia Bárcena (2023–2024)
  2. Juan Ramón de la Fuente (2024–present)
- Nicaragua –
  1. Denis Moncada (2017–2024)
  2. Valdrack Jaentschke (2024–present)
- Panama –
  1. Janaina Tewaney (2022–2024)
  2. Javier Martínez-Acha (2024–present)
- Puerto Rico – Omar J. Marrero (2021–2025)
- Saint Kitts and Nevis – Denzil Douglas (2022–present)
- Saint Lucia – Alva Baptiste (2021–present)
- Saint Vincent and the Grenadines – Keisal Peters (2022–present)
- Trinidad and Tobago – Amery Browne (2020–2025)
- United States – Antony Blinken (2021–2025)

== Oceania ==
- Australia – Penny Wong (2022–present)
- Cook Islands – Mark Brown (2013–present)
- Fiji – Sitiveni Rabuka (2022–present)
- French Polynesia – Moetai Brotherson (2023–present)
- Kiribati – Taneti Maamau (2016–present)
- Marshall Islands –
  1. Jack Ading (2023–2024)
  2. Kalani Kaneko (2024–present)
- Federated States of Micronesia – Lorin S. Robert (2023–present)
- Nauru – Lionel Aingimea (2023–present)
- New Zealand – Winston Peters (2023–present)
- Niue – Dalton Tagelagi (2020–present)
- Palau – Gustav Aitaro (2021–present)
- Papua New Guinea –
  1. James Marape (2023–2024)
  2. Justin Tkatchenko (2024–present)
- Samoa – Fiamē Naomi Mataʻafa (2021–present)
- Solomon Islands –
  1. Jeremiah Manele (2019–2024)
  2. Peter Shannel Agovaka (2024–present)
- Tokelau –
  1. Kelihiano Kalolo (2023–2024)
  2. Esera Fofō Tuisano (2024–2025)
- Tonga –
  1. Fekitamoeloa ʻUtoikamanu (2021–2024)
  2. Siaosi Sovaleni, Acting (2024)
  3. Samiu Vaipulu, Acting (2024–2025)
- Tuvalu –
  1. Panapasi Nelesoni (2023–2024)
  2. Paulson Panapa (2024–present)
- Vanuatu – Matai Seremaiah (2023–2025)

== South America ==
- Argentina –
  1. Diana Mondino (2023–2024)
  2. Gerardo Werthein (2024–present)
- Bolivia – Celinda Sosa Lunda (2023–present)
- Brazil – Mauro Vieira (2023–present)
- Chile – Alberto van Klaveren (2023–present)
- Colombia –
  1. Álvaro Leyva (2022–2024)
  2. Luis Gilberto Murillo (2024–2025)
- Ecuador – Gabriela Sommerfeld (2023–present)
- Guyana – Hugh Todd (2020–present)
- Paraguay – Rubén Ramírez Lezcano (2023–present)
- Peru –
  1. Javier González-Olaechea (2023–2024)
  2. Elmer Schialer (2024–present)
- Suriname – Albert Ramdin (2020–present)
- Uruguay – Omar Paganini (2023–2025)
- Venezuela – Yván Gil (2023–present)

== See also ==
- List of current foreign ministers
