= List of foreign ministers in 2023 =

This is a list of foreign ministers in 2023.

== Africa ==
- Algeria – Ahmed Attaf (2023–present)
- Angola – Tete António (2020–present)
- Benin –
  1. Aurélien Agbénonci (2016–2023)
  2. Paulette Marcelline Adjovi (2023)
  3. Shegun Adjadi Bakari (2023–present)
- Botswana – Lemogang Kwape (2020–present)
- Burkina Faso –
  1. Olivia Rouamba (2022–2023)
  2. Karamoko Jean-Marie Traoré (2023–present)
- Burundi – Albert Shingiro (2020–present)
- Cameroon – Lejeune Mbella Mbella (2015–present)
- Cape Verde – Rui Alberto de Figueiredo Soares (2021–present)
- Central African Republic – Sylvie Baïpo-Temon (2018–present)
- Chad – Mahamat Saleh Annadif (2022–present)
- Comoros – Dhoihir Dhoulkamal (2020–present)
- Congo–Brazzaville (Republic of the Congo) – Jean-Claude Gakosso (2015–present)
- Congo–Kinshasa (Democratic Republic of the Congo) – Christophe Lutundula (2021–present)
- Djibouti – Mahamoud Ali Youssouf (2005–present)
- Egypt – Sameh Shoukry (2014–present)
- Equatorial Guinea – Simeón Oyono Esono Angüe (2018–present)
- Eritrea – Osman Saleh Mohammed (2007–present)
- Ethiopia – Demeke Mekonnen (2020–present)
- Gabon –
  1. Michael Moussa Adamo (2022–2023)
  2. Hermann Immongault (2023)
  3. Régis Onanga Ndiaye (2023–present)
- The Gambia – Mamadou Tangara (2018–present)
- Ghana – Shirley Ayorkor Botchway (2017–present)
- Guinea – Morissanda Kouyaté (2021–present)
- Guinea-Bissau –
  1. Suzi Barbosa (2020–2023)
  2. Carlos Pinto Pereira (2023–present)
- Ivory Coast (Côte d'Ivoire) – Kandia Camara (2021–present)
- Kenya –
  1. Alfred Mutua (2022–2023)
  2. Musalia Mudavadi (2023–present)
- Lesotho – Mpotjoane Lejone (2022–present)
- Liberia – Dee-Maxwell Saah Kemayah, Sr (2020–present)
- Libya –
  - Najla Mangoush (2021–present)
  - Hafez Kaddour (2022–present)
- Madagascar – Yvette Sylla (2023–2024)
- Malawi – Nancy Tembo (2022–present)
- Mali – Abdoulaye Diop (2021–present)
- Mauritania – Mohamed Salem Ould Merzoug (2022–present)
- Mauritius – Maneesh Gobin (2023–present)
- Morocco – Nasser Bourita (2017–present)
- Mozambique – Verónica Macamo (2020–present)
- Namibia – Netumbo Nandi-Ndaitwah (2012–present)
- Niger –
  1. Hassoumi Massaoudou (2021–2023)
  2. Bakary Yaou Sangaré (2023–present)
- Nigeria –
  1. Geoffrey Onyeama (2015–2023)
  2. Yusuf Tuggar (2023–present)
- Rwanda – Vincent Biruta (2019–present)
- Sahrawi Arab Democratic Republic –
  1. Mohamed Salem Ould Salek (1998–2023)
  2. Mohamed Sidati (2023–2025)
- São Tomé and Príncipe –
  1. Alberto Neto Pereira (2022–2023)
  2. Gareth Guadalupe (2023–present)
- Senegal – Aïssata Tall Sall (2020–present)
- Seychelles – Sylvestre Radegonde (2020–2025)
- Sierra Leone –
  1. David J. Francis (2021–2023)
  2. Timothy Kabba (2023–present)
- Somalia – Abshir Omar Huruse (2022–2023)
- Somaliland – Essa Kayd (2020–present)
- South Africa – Naledi Pandor (2019–present)
- South Sudan –
  1. Joseph Makuer Nyieth (2022–2023)
  2. James Pitia Morgan (2023–present)
- Sudan –
  1. Mayiik Ayii Deng (2021–2023)
  2. Deng Dau Deng Malek (acting) (2023)
  3. James Pitia Morgan (2023–present)
- Swaziland – Thuli Dladla (2018–present)
- Tanzania –
  1. Stergomena Tax (2022–2023)
  2. January Makamba (2023–present)
- Togo – Robert Dussey (2013–present)
- Tunisia –
  1. Othman Jerandi (2020–2023)
  2. Nabil Ammar (2023–present)
- Uganda – Jeje Odongo (2021–present)
- Zambia – Stanley Kakubo (2021–2023)
- Zimbabwe – Frederick Shava (2021–present)

== Asia ==
- Abkhazia – Inal Ardzinba (2021–present)
- Afghanistan – Amir Khan Muttaqi (acting) (2021–present)
- Armenia – Ararat Mirzoyan (2021–present)
- Artsakh –
  1. David Babayan (2021–2023)
  2. Sergey Ghazaryan (2023–2024)
- Azerbaijan – Jeyhun Bayramov (2020–present)
- Bahrain – Abdullatif bin Rashid Al Zayani (2020–present)
- Bangladesh – AK Abdul Momen (2019–2024)
- Bhutan – Tandi Dorji (2018–present)
- Brunei – Hassanal Bolkiah (2015–present)
- Cambodia –
  1. Prak Sokhonn (2016–2023)
  2. Sok Chenda Sophea (2023–present)
- China (People's Republic of China) –
  1. Qin Gang (2022–2023)
  2. Wang Yi (2023–present)
- East Timor –
  1. Adaljiza Magno (2020–2023)
  2. Bendito Freitas (2023–present)
- Georgia – Ilia Darchiashvili (2022–present)
- India – Subrahmanyam Jaishankar (2019–present)
- Indonesia – Retno Marsudi (2014–present)
- Iran –
  1. Hossein Amir-Abdollahian (2021–2024)
  2. Ali Bagheri (2024–present)
- Iraq – Fuad Hussein (2020–present)
  - Kurdistan – Safeen Dizayee (2019–present)
- Israel – Eli Cohen (2022–2024)
- Japan –
  1. Yoshimasa Hayashi (2021–2023)
  2. Yōko Kamikawa (2023–2024)
- Jordan – Ayman Safadi (2017–present)
- Kazakhstan –
  1. Mukhtar Tleuberdi (2019–2023)
  2. Murat Nurtleu (2023–present)
- North Korea (Democratic People's Republic of Korea) – Choe Son-hui (2022–present)
- South Korea (Republic of Korea) – Park Jin (2022–2024)
- Kuwait – Sheikh Salem Abdullah Al-Jaber Al-Sabah (2022–present)
- Kyrgyzstan – Jeenbek Kulubaev (2022–present)
- Laos – Saleumxay Kommasith (2016–present)
- Lebanon – Abdallah Bou Habib (2021–present)
- Malaysia –
  1. Zambry Abdul Kadir (2022–2023)
  2. Mohamad Hasan (2023–present)
- Maldives –
  1. Abdulla Shahid (2018–2023)
  2. Moosa Zameer (2023–present)
- Mongolia – Battsetseg Batmunkh (2021–present)
- Myanmar
  - Myanmar – Wunna Maung Lwin (2021–2023)
  - National Unity Government of Myanmar (body claiming to be the legitimate government of Myanmar (Burma), existing in parallel with State Administration Council military junta) – Zin Mar Aung (2021–present)
- Nepal –
  1. Bimala Rai Paudyal (2023)
  2. Narayan Prakash Saud (2023–present)
- Oman – Badr bin Hamad Al Busaidi (2020–present)
- Pakistan –
  1. Bilawal Bhutto Zardari (2022–2023)
  2. Jalil Abbas Jilani (2023–present)
- Palestine – Riyad al-Maliki (2007–2024)
- Philippines –Enrique Manalo (2022–2025)
- Qatar – Mohammed bin Abdulrahman bin Jassim Al Thani (2016–present)
- Saudi Arabia – Prince Faisal bin Farhan Al Saud (2019–present)
- Singapore – Vivian Balakrishnan (2015–present)
- South Ossetia – Akhsar Dzhioev (2022–present)
- Sri Lanka –
1. Prof. Gamini Lakshman Peiris (2021–2022)
2. Ali Sabry (2022–present)
- Syria (Syrian Arab Republic) – Faisal Mekdad (2020–present)
- Taiwan (Republic of China) – Joseph Wu (2018–2024)
- Tajikistan – Sirodjidin Aslov (2013–present)
- Thailand –
  1. Don Pramudwinai (2015–2023)
  2. Parnpree Bahiddha-nukara (2023–2024)
- Turkey –
  1. Mevlüt Çavuşoğlu (2015–2023)
  2. Hakan Fidan (2023–present)
- Turkmenistan – Raşit Meredow (2001–present)
- United Arab Emirates – Sheikh Abdullah bin Zayed Al Nahyan (2006–present)
- Uzbekistan – Baxtiyor Saidov (acting) (2022–present)
- Vietnam – Bùi Thanh Sơn (2021–present)
- Yemen
  - Republic of Yemen – Ahmad Awad bin Mubarak (2020–present)
  - Supreme Political Council (unrecognised, rival government) – Hisham Abdullah (2016–present)

== Europe ==
- Albania –
  1. Olta Xhaçka (2020–2023)
  2. Igli Hasani (2023–present)
- Andorra –
  1. Maria Ubach i Font (2017–2023)
  2. Imma Tor Faus (2023–present)
- Austria – Alexander Schallenberg (2021–present)
- Belarus
  - Belarus – Sergei Aleinik (2022–2024)
  - National Anti-Crisis Management ("Shadow-government-like" organisation) – Anatoly Kotov (2020–present)
- Belgium – Hadja Lahbib (2022–present)
  - Brussels – Pascal Smet (2019–present)
  - Flanders – Jan Jambon (2019–present)
  - Wallonia – Elio Di Rupo (2019–present)
- Bosnia and Herzegovina –
  1. Bisera Turković (2019–2023)
  2. Elmedin Konaković (2023–present)
- Bulgaria –
  1. Nikolay Milkov (2022–2023)
  2. Ivan Kondov (2023)
  3. Mariya Gabriel (2023–present)
- Croatia – Gordan Grlić-Radman (2019–present)
- Cyprus –
  1. Ioannis Kasoulidis (2022–2023)
  2. Constantinos Kombos (2023–present)
- Czech Republic – Jan Lipavský (2021–present)
- Denmark – Lars Løkke Rasmussen (2022–present)
  - Faroe Islands – Jenis av Rana (2019–present)
- Estonia –
  1. Urmas Reinsalu (2022–2023)
  2. Margus Tsahkna (2023–present)
- Finland –
  1. Pekka Haavisto (2019–2023)
  2. Elina Valtonen (2023–present)
- France – Catherine Colonna (2022–2024)
- Germany – Annalena Baerbock (2021–present)
- Greece –
  1. Nikos Dendias (2019–2023)
  2. Vasilis Kaskarelis (2023)
  3. Giorgos Gerapetritis (2023–present)
- Guernsey –
  1. Peter Ferbrache (2020–2023)
  2. Lyndon Trott (2023–present)
- Hungary – Péter Szijjártó (2014–present)
- Iceland – Þórdís Kolbrún R. Gylfadóttir (2021–present)
- Ireland – Micheál Martin (2022–present)
- Italy – Antonio Tajani (2022–present)
- Jersey – Philip Ozouf (2022–present)
- Kosovo – Donika Gërvalla-Schwarz (2021–present)
- Latvia –
  1. Edgars Rinkēvičs (2011–2023)
  2. Krišjānis Kariņš (2023–present)
- Liechtenstein – Dominique Hasler (2021–present)
- Lithuania – Gabrielius Landsbergis (2020–present)
- Lugansk People's Republic – Vladislav Deinevo (2017–present)
- Luxembourg –
  1. Jean Asselborn (2004–2023)
  2. Xavier Bettel (2023–present)
- Malta –
1. Evarist Bartolo (2020–2022)
2. Ian Borg (2022–present)
- Moldova – Nicu Popescu (2021–present)
  - Gagauzia – Vitaliy Vlah (2015–present)
- Monaco – Isabelle Berro-Lefèvre (2022–present)
- Montenegro –
  1. Ranko Krivokapić (2022–2023)
  2. Filip Ivanović (2023–present)
- Netherlands –
  1. Wopke Hoekstra (2022–2023)
  2. Liesje Schreinemacher (2023)
  3. Hanke Bruins Slot (2023–2024)
- North Macedonia – Bujar Osmani (2020–present)
- Northern Cyprus – Hasan Taçoy (2022–present)
- Norway –
  1. Anniken Huitfeldt (2021–2023)
  2. Espen Barth Eide (2023–present)
- Poland –
  1. Zbigniew Rau (2020–2023)
  2. Szymon Szynkowski vel Sęk (2023)
  3. Radosław Sikorski (2023–present)
- Portugal – João Gomes Cravinho (2022–present)
- Romania –
  1. Bogdan Aurescu (2019–2023)
  2. Luminița Odobescu (2023–present)
- Russia – Sergey Lavrov (2004–present)
- San Marino – Luca Beccari (2020–present)
- Serbia – Nikola Selaković (2020–present)
- Slovakia –
  1. Rastislav Káčer (2022–2023)
  2. Miroslav Wlachovský (2023)
  3. Juraj Blanár (2023–present)
- Slovenia – Tanja Fajon (2022–present)
- Spain – José Manuel Albares (2021–present)
  - Catalonia – Victòria Alsina Burgués (2021–present)
- Sweden – Tobias Billström (2022–present)
- Switzerland – Ignazio Cassis (2017–present)
- Transnistria – Vitaly Ignatiev (2015–present)
- Ukraine – Dmytro Kuleba (2020–present)
- United Kingdom –
  1. James Cleverly (2022–2023)
  2. David Cameron (2023–2024)
  - Scotland – Angus Robertson (2021–present)
- Vatican City – Archbishop Paul Gallagher (2014–present)

== North America and the Caribbean ==
- Antigua and Barbuda – E.P. Chet Greene (2018–present)
- The Bahamas – Fred Mitchell (2021–present)
- Barbados – Jerome Walcott (2018–present)
- Belize – Eamon Courtenay (2020–present)
- Canada – Mélanie Joly (2021–present)
  - Quebec – Nadine Girault (2018–present)
- Costa Rica – Arnoldo André Tinoco (2022–present)
- Cuba – Bruno Rodríguez Parrilla (2009–present)
- Dominica – Kenneth Darroux (2019–present)
- Dominican Republic – Roberto Álvarez (2020–present)
- El Salvador – Alexandra Hill Tinoco (2019–present)
- Greenland – Múte Bourup Egede (2021–present)
- Grenada – Joseph Andall (2022–present)
- Guatemala – Mario Búcaro (2022–2024)
- Haiti – Jean Victor Généus (2021–present)
- Honduras – Eduardo Enrique Reina (2022–present)
- Jamaica – Kamina Johnson Smith (2016–present)
- Mexico –
  1. Marcelo Ebrard (2018–2023)
  2. Alicia Bárcena (2023–2024)
- Nicaragua – Denis Moncada (2017–present)
- Panama – Janaina Tewaney (2022–present)
- Puerto Rico – Omar J. Marrero (2021–present)
- Saint Kitts and Nevis – Denzil Douglas (2022–present)
- Saint Lucia – Alva Baptiste (2021–present)
- Saint Vincent and the Grenadines – Ralph Gonsalves (2020–present)
- Trinidad and Tobago – Amery Browne (2020–present)
- United States – Antony Blinken (2021–2025)

== Oceania ==
- Australia – Penny Wong (2022–present)
- Cook Islands – Mark Brown (2013–present)
- Fiji – Sitiveni Rabuka (2022–present)
- French Polynesia –
  1. Édouard Fritch (2014–2023)
  2. Moetai Brotherson (2023–present)
- Kiribati – Taneti Mamau (2016–present)
- Marshall Islands –
  1. Kitlang Kabua (2022–2023)
  2. Christopher Loeak (2023)
  3. Jack Ading (2023–2024)
- Micronesia –
  1. Kandhi A. Elieisar (2019–2023)
  2. Brendy H. Carl (2023)
  3. Ricky F. Cantero (2023)
  4. Lorin S. Robert (2023–present)
- Nauru –
  1. Russ Kun (2022–2023)
  2. Lionel Aingimea (2023–present)
- New Zealand –
  1. Nanaia Mahuta (2020–2023)
  2. Grant Robertson (2023–present)
- Niue – Dalton Tagelagi (2020–present)
- Palau – Gustav Aitaro (2021–present)
- Papua New Guinea –
  1. Justin Tkatchenko (2022–2023)
  2. James Marape (2023–2024)
- Samoa – Fiamē Naomi Mataʻafa (2021–present)
- Solomon Islands – Jeremiah Manele (2019–present)
- Tokelau – Kelihiano Kalolo (2021–present)
- Tonga – Fekitamoeloa ʻUtoikamanu (2021–present)
- Tuvalu –
  1. Simon Kofe (2019–2023)
  2. Panapasi Nelesoni (2023-2024)
- Vanuatu –
  1. Jotham Napat (2022–2023)
  2. Matai Seremaiah (2023)
  3. Marc Ati (2023)
  4. Matai Seremaiah (2023–present)

== South America ==
- Argentina –
  1. Santiago Cafiero (2021–2023)
  2. Diana Mondino (2023–present)
- Bolivia –
  1. Rogelio Mayta (2020–2023)
  2. Celinda Sosa (2023–present)
- Brazil – Mauro Luiz Iecker Vieira (2022–present)
- Chile –
  1. Antonia Urrejola (2022–2023)
  2. Alberto van Klaveren (2023–present)
- Colombia – Álvaro Leyva (2022–present)
- Ecuador –
  1. Juan Carlos Holguín (2022–2023)
  2. Gustavo Manrique (2023)
  3. Gabriela Sommerfeld (2023–present)
- Guyana – Hugh Todd (2020–present)
- Paraguay –
  1. Julio Arriola (2022–2023)
  2. Rubén Ramírez Lezcano (2023–present)
- Peru –
  1. Ana Gervasi (2022–2023)
  2. Javier González-Olaechea (2023–present)
- Suriname – Albert Ramdin (2020–present)
- Uruguay –
  1. Francisco Bustillo (2020–2023)
  2. Diego Escuder (2023)
  3. Omar Paganini (2023–present)
- Venezuela –
  1. Carlos Faría (2022–2023)
  2. Yván Gil Pinto (2023–present)

== See also ==
- List of current foreign ministers
