= Kosovo–South Sudan relations =

- Kosovo: South Sudan

Kosovar–South Sudanese relations are foreign relations between South Sudan and Kosovo.

== History ==
In July 2011, Kosovo's First deputy prime minister, Behgjet Pacolli, was invited to attend South Sudan's independence ceremony.

In September 2012, South Sudan's vice-president, Riek Machar Teny, invited Kosovo's prime minister, Hashim Thaçi, to South Sudan to discuss building bilateral relations between the two countries. During an October 2012 meeting with Pacolli, South Sudan's president Salva Kiir stated his country's desire to maintain friendly relations with Kosovo. He reiterated the position that South Sudan supports the right of the citizens of Kosovo to build and consolidate their state. In September 2013 the Foreign Minister of South Sudan, Barnaba Marial Benjamin, confirmed that the recognition of Kosovo was a matter of time.

In April 2014, Benjamin said that positive news in regards to improving relations with Kosovo should be expected. In September 2014, Benjamin said that South Sudan was considering with seriousness the recognition of the independence and would follow all the procedures in order to do so.

On 2 March 2024, Kosovo's president Vjosa Osmani met South Sudanese foreign minister James Pitia Morgan and discussed the strengthening of cooperation between the two countries. A statement from the South Sudanese foreign ministry referred to Osmani as the "President of the Republic of Kosovo", implying acknowledgement of the Republic of Kosovo as a state, and said that "both agreed to arrange reciprocal visits to examine and finalize cooperation agreements that would bring significant benefits to the citizens of both countries".

== See also ==
- Foreign relations of South Sudan
- Foreign relations of Kosovo
