= Gazije =

Gazije may refer to:

- Gazije, nickname of one of the special units of the 505th Bužim Brigade of the 5th Corps of the Army of the Republic of Bosnia and Herzegovina
- Gazije, Bosnia and Herzegovina, a village near Rogatica
- Gazije, Croatia, a village near Feričanci
