= András Lénárd =

Hungarian businessman and investor

- Born: 6 September 1977 (age 49); Miercurea Ciuc, Romania
- Citizenship: Romanian, Hungarian
- Occupations: Businessman, investor
- Known for: Trademark dispute with Heineken
- Title: Founding president of the Association of Factory Owners and Industrialists of Szeklerland

András Lénárd (born 6 September 1977 in Miercurea Ciuc) is a Romanian businessman and investor of Székely Hungarian ethnicity. He has been involved in the creation and development of businesses in several sectors, including property development, energy, food manufacturing and technology.

His best-known business has been the Csíki Sör Manufactory in Sânsimion, which gained international attention through its trademark dispute with the Romanian subsidiary of Heineken. Some of Lénárd's ventures in the energy sector were acquired by Magyar Villamos Művek. In 2024, he sold his 50 per cent interest in the corporate group that included the Csíki Sör and Csíki Csipsz production units founded by him. Székelyhon reported, citing market information, that the buyout may have taken place at a corporate valuation of approximately €50 million.

== Early years and property development ==
Lénárd was born in Rumania and moved to the United States in the second half of the 1990s. In a 2020 interview, he said that he initially worked as a house painter before moving on to production and organisational roles in a sportswear company. He returned to Romania in 2001.

Starting in 2005, he was involved in property development in and around Miercurea Ciuc. Press reports have linked him to residential developments in the Jigodin and Șumuleu Ciuc areas and to the Hét vezér residential project. According to a Romanian press profile published in 2024, he was also involved in developing a four-star hotel in Budapest in 2015, which he later sold.

== Hydropower investments ==
Starting in the late 2000s, Lénárd became involved in hydropower projects. HydroEnergy Zrt., in which he held a majority interest, and related Romanian project companies developed power plants on the Vârghiș River and in the Valea Uzului area.

In January 2015, MVM completed the acquisition of a 90 per cent interest in Hivatalos SRL, the company that owned the Valea Uzului hydropower complex, from Winsland Holding Ltd. and HydroEnergy Zrt. MVM reported the total transaction value as €27.8 million.

The projects drew criticism regarding their environmental and economic aspects. Átlátszó Erdély reported that the Valea Uzului complex generated less electricity than initially estimated and that riverbed interventions raised environmental concerns. Lénárd responded that the projects had the required permits and that their environmental impact was limited.

The run-of-river hydropower technology used at Valea Uzului is commonly used in Europe. According to the European Small Hydropower Association, approximately 14,000 small hydropower plants operated in the old member states of the European Union, a further 2,800 in the new member states and approximately 400 in candidate countries, meaning that nearly 17,000 such facilities operated in Europe in total.

The European Commission published separate guidance on how hydropower developments may be reconciled with the Natura 2000 nature-conservation framework and the requirements of the Water Framework Directive. According to the guidance, construction of hydropower plants is not prohibited, but an investment must be preceded by an environmental assessment and permitting procedure.

The electricity output of run-of-river hydropower plants depends directly on the hydrological conditions of the catchment area, including precipitation, snowmelt and water-flow conditions. As a result, annual energy production may vary naturally, and data from individual years may not necessarily be suitable for assessing the long-term performance of a facility.

== Csíki Sör and food production ==
In 2013, Lénárd acquired a former distillery in Sânsimion and converted it into a brewery. Production began in 2014 through Lixid Project SRL, with Lénárd serving as a major shareholder, business manager and public representative of the brand.

The Csíki Sör and Igazi Csíki Sör trademarks led to several Romanian and European trademark disputes between Lixid Project and Heineken's Romanian subsidiary. Heineken argued that the trademarks could be confused with its Ciuc Premium brand. The proceedings produced differing rulings before the parties reached an amicable settlement in March 2017, allowing the Ciuc and Csíki trademarks to coexist and ending the related litigation. The New York Times covered the dispute in the context of local identity, economic nationalism and distrust of multinational companies in the region.

A wider corporate group later developed around the brewery, including distribution, hospitality and food-production businesses. Pityóka Gyár SRL was established in 2017, and production of Csíki Csipsz began in 2020. According to the Pro Economica Foundation, the potato-processing investment, valued at almost 4.5 billion Hungarian forints, received 1.7 billion forints in non-repayable support from the Hungarian government.

In September 2024, Lénárd stated that he had sold 50 per cent of his shares in the Csíki Group to his partner. The transaction included the brewery and snack factory as well as restaurants, distribution and event companies.

Subsequent court proceedings showed that the insolvency proceedings had been initiated by Lixid Holding BV, a Netherlands-registered company holding a 50 per cent interest in Lixid Project SRL. The proceedings ended before a decision on the merits after the applicant withdrew its petition, and no insolvency proceedings were ultimately ordered against the company.

== Technology ventures ==
Lénárd participated in the development of the drone-technology company Spider Drone Security together with engineer Attila Bustya, who was responsible for the technical development, while Lénárd was involved in financing and business organisation.

On 30 October 2015, a multirotor drone designed by Bustya completed a flight lasting 2 hours, 6 minutes and 7 seconds at Sânsimion, setting a Guinness World Record for the duration of a remotely controlled model multicopter flight. In 2016, Lénárd and Bustya were included as founders of Spider Drone Security in the New Europe 100 list compiled by the Res Publica Foundation with the Financial Times, Google and the International Visegrad Fund.

Lénárd's technology ventures also included Swiss Message Bank, a service designed to store encrypted voice messages for long periods and deliver them later to designated recipients.

== Industry organisation ==
Lénárd is a founder and president of the Association of Factory Owners and Industrialists of Szeklerland. The stated objectives of the association include cooperation between industrial companies, professional representation, job creation, economic development and vocational education in the region.

As president of the association, he initiated public discussions in 2023 on the economic situation of Szeklerland and the need for a regional economic-development strategy.

== Dracula Park Transylvania ==
In June 2025, Lénárd announced plans for Dracula Park Transylvania, a proposed theme park in the Jigodin Baths area of Miercurea Ciuc. The announced budget for the first phase was €56 million, and the Italian company Antonio Zamperla Spa was named as the project's technology partner.

At the beginning of 2026, the project remained in the planning stage. Investor communications described a site of nearly 30 hectares, more than 50 themed buildings and a proposed opening in 2027, subject to detailed design, permitting and financing.

== Recognitions ==
Year	Award or recognition	Awarding institution / organiser	Recipient and nature
2015	OMÉK Ministerial Grand Prize	National Agricultural and Food Industry Exhibition	Corporate recognition awarded to Lixid Project and Igazi Csíki Sör.
2015	Magyar Termék Nagydíj – Regional Special Prize	Magyar Termék Nagydíj award system	Recognition of the product-development collaboration between Csíki Sör Manufactory and Sapientia Hungarian University of Transylvania.
2015	Guinness World Records	Guinness World Records	Spider Drone Security's multicopter flight record of 2 hours, 6 minutes and 7 seconds; Lénárd was the business co-founder and financier of the company.
2016	Pro Universitate Siculorum	Sapientia Hungarian University of Transylvania, bioengineering programme in Miercurea Ciuc	Personal recognition awarded to Lénárd for supporting the development of the institution and the programme.
2016	New Europe 100	Res Publica Foundation, Financial Times, Google and International Visegrad Fund	Innovation recognition awarded to András Lénárd and Attila Bustya as co-founders of Spider Drone Security.
2020	Recognition	Military Police Centre of the Hungarian Defence Forces	Support and cooperation recognition awarded to András Lénárd.
2021	Excellence in Transylvanian community life	Transilvanum Foundation	Community recognition awarded to András Lénárd and Tiltott Csíki Sör.
2021	Emberek a Városért recognition	Municipality of Miercurea Ciuc	Corporate and community recognition awarded to Igazi Csíki Sör for supporting municipal events and initiatives.
2021	Magyar Családokért recognition	Association for the Interests of Hungarian Women	Corporate recognition awarded to Csíki Sör Manufactory for its donation activities during the coronavirus pandemic. The recognition was presented at the Magyar Családokért award ceremony on 14 June 2021.

== Legal and public controversies ==
=== Criminal case in the United States ===
News reports published in 2018, based on United States court records, stated that Lénárd was detained in 2001 near the border between the United States and Canada. A single federal charge relating to the unlawful bringing of foreign nationals into the United States was filed in the United States District Court for the Northern District of New York. He was released on bail but later failed to appear in court after returning to Romania and being unable to return to the United States.

In 2023, under the Speedy Trial Act, the United States Attorney's Office for the Northern District of New York dismissed the charge. On 1 August 2023, federal judge Lawrence E. Kahn approved the dismissal of the single count with prejudice.

=== Diplomatic passport ===
According to a parliamentary response by Hungary's Ministry of Foreign Affairs and Trade, Lénárd had been issued a diplomatic passport “to promote the success of foreign economic activity”. Foreign minister Péter Szijjártó withdrew the passport in 2024.
