= Elmedin Konaković =

Bosnian politician (born 1974)

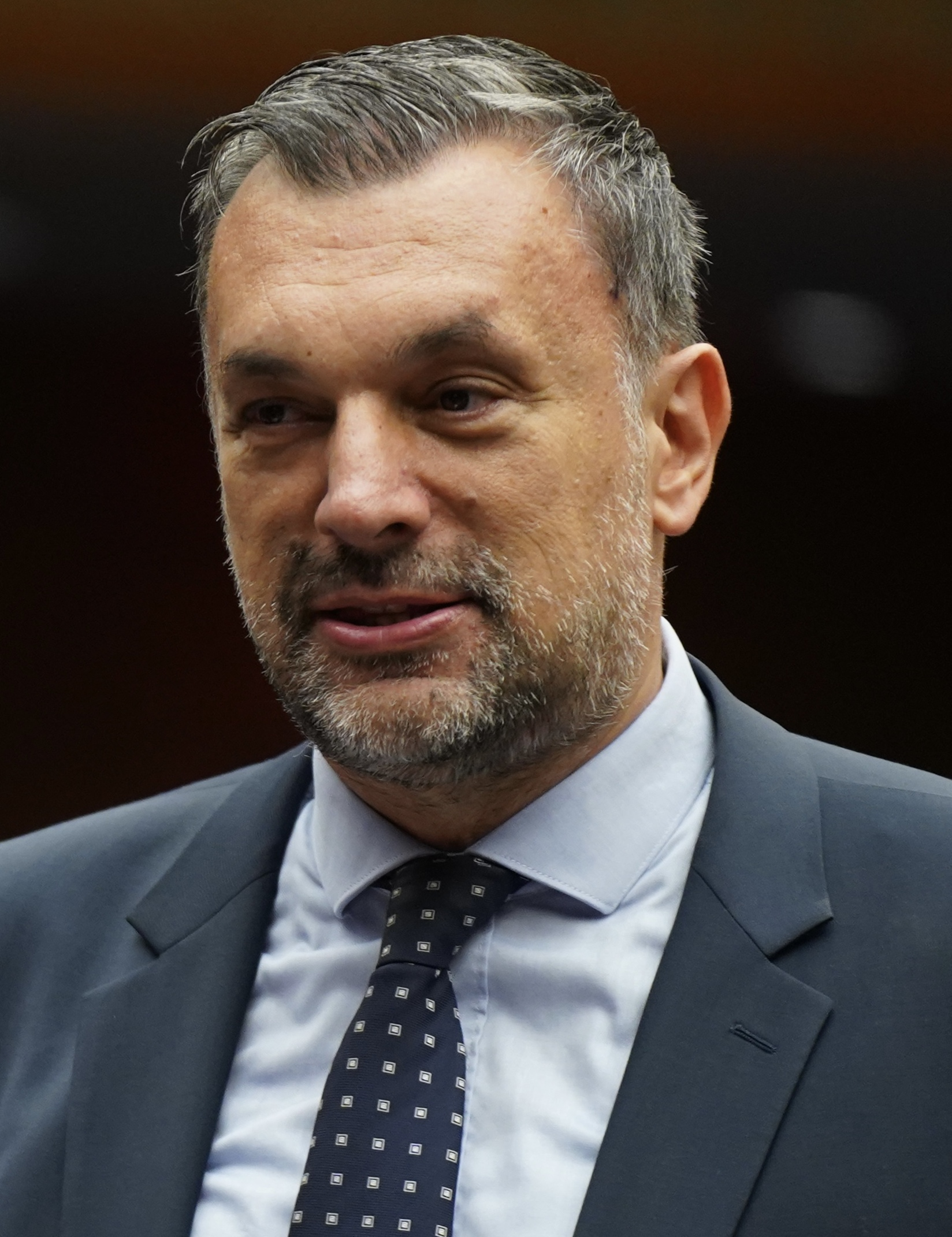
- Konaković in 2025

Minister of Foreign Affairs
- Incumbent
- Assumed office 25 January 2023
- Prime Minister: Borjana Krišto
- Preceded by: Bisera Turković

Prime Minister of Sarajevo Canton
- In office 23 March 2015 – 4 April 2018
- Preceded by: Muhamed Kozadra
- Succeeded by: Adem Zolj
Parliamentary offices
Member of the Federal House of Representatives
In office 1 December 2022 – 25 January 2023
Constituency	11th Electoral Unit of the FBiH
Member of the Federal House of Peoples
In office 1 July 2019 – 1 December 2022

Personal details
- Born: 3 September 1974 (age 52) Sarajevo, SR Bosnia and Herzegovina, SFR Yugoslavia
- Party: People and Justice (2018–present)
- Other political affiliations: Party of Democratic Action (2004–2018)
- Spouses: Martina Saira Keškić (m. 2011; div. 2014) Dalija Hasanbegović (m. 2016)
- Children: 2
- Education: University of Sarajevo (BSSM, MSSM)

Elmedin "Dino" Konaković (born 3 September 1974) is a Bosnian politician who has served as Minister of Foreign Affairs since January 2023. He is the founder and president of the People and Justice (NiP) party since 2018, and was previously a member of the Federal House of Representatives from 2022 to 2023. Konaković was also a member of the Federal House of Peoples from 2019 to 2022, as well as Prime Minister of Sarajevo Canton from 2015 to 2018.

Born in Sarajevo in 1974, Konaković was part of Bosnian Army during the Bosnian War. After the war, he went on to pursue a professional career in basketball, playing for prominent club KK Bosna, among others. Konaković graduated in sport management at the University of Sarajevo and later worked in sport management after retiring. He entered into politics in the early 2000s as a member of the Party of Democratic Action (SDA), slowly rising through its ranks before serving as a member of the Sarajevo Canton Assembly from 2010 to 2014. Following the 2014 general election, he became Prime Minister of Sarajevo Canton.

In February 2018, Konaković left the SDA. Subsequently, he formed NiP and was consequently ousted as prime minister in April. He was elected to the Sarajevo Canton Assembly in the 2018 general election, and also became a member of the Federal House of Peoples. In the 2022 general election, Konaković was elected to the Federal House of Representatives. However, after the formation of a new national coalition, he was appointed Minister of Foreign Affairs in the Fourteenth Council of Ministers of Bosnia and Herzegovina.

== Early life and education ==
Konaković was born in Sarajevo, SFR Yugoslavia, present-day Bosnia and Herzegovina in 1974. His paternal family hails from the village of Gazije near Rogatica. He graduated from Electrical Engineering secondary School "Jaroslav Černi" in 1992 and, after the Bosnian War, from the Faculty of Sports and Physical Education of the University of Sarajevo, earning a master's degree in 2017.

== Early career ==
During the Bosnian War from 1992 to 1995, Konaković joined the Army of the Republic of Bosnia and Herzegovina (10th Mountain Brigade and 15th Motorized Brigade) and played in Sarajevo's famous basketball club, former European champion KK Bosna. He continued his career in the late 1990s in Slovenia, Hungary and Romania. In 2002, Konaković became director of the Bosnia and Herzegovina men's national basketball team, and in 2003 director of KK Bosna, a position he held until 2007.

== Political career ==
Konaković joined the Party of Democratic Action (SDA) in 2004, and was elected to the local council of the Centar municipality in the capital Sarajevo. In the 2008 municipal elections, he unsuccessfully ran for municipal mayor of Centar. He was elected to the Sarajevo Canton Assembly in the 2010 general election and became chair of the SDA MPs caucus.

On 23 March 2015, Konaković was appointed Prime Minister of Sarajevo Canton. He was removed from the post in April 2018, after he had decided to leave the SDA, disappointed with the party's policies. Konaković then set up his own party, People and Justice (NiP), and was then elected speaker of the Sarajevo Canton Assembly after the 2018 general election, serving until January 2020. Meanwhile, in July 2019, he was appointed to the Federal House of Peoples.

Konaković has described NiP as a centrist party advocating for transparency, efficiency, and institutional reform. In the 2020 municipal elections, NiP significantly increased its share of votes in Sarajevo, becoming the largest political party in the city. The 2024 municipal elections saw NiP suffer noticeable losses in Sarajevo, losing municipal councilors in all four of the city's municipalities. Commenting on the results, Konaković said that NiP was "the loser in Sarajevo" and that it was a "well-deserved slap in the face."

== Minister of Foreign Affairs (2023–present) ==
=== Appointment ===
On 25 January 2023, following the formation of a new Council of Ministers presided over by Borjana Krišto, Konaković was appointed as the new Minister of Foreign Affairs within Krišto's government.

=== Tenure ===
Konaković alongside Austrian and Italian counterparts Alexander Schallenberg and Antonio Tajani, 10 March 2023

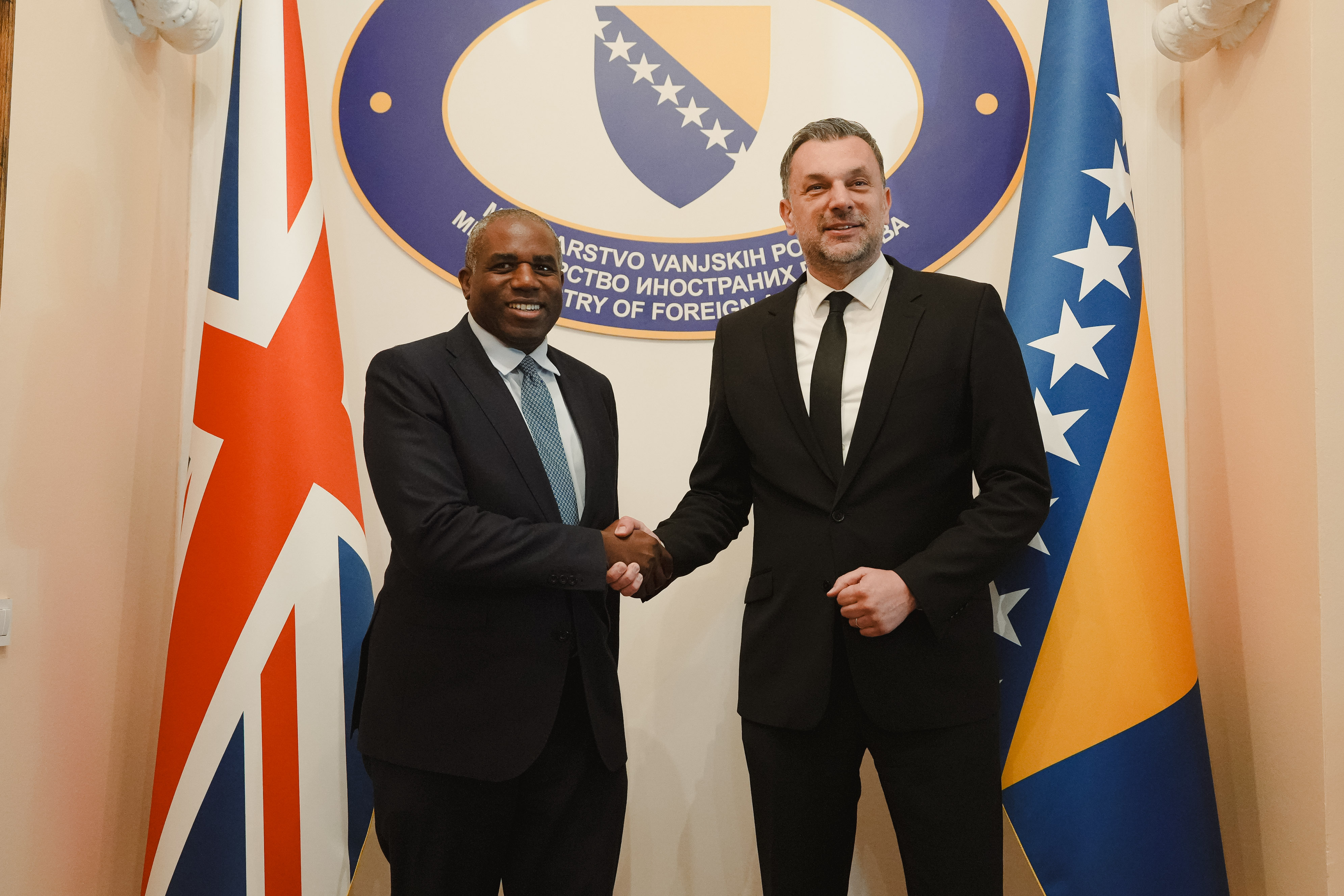
Konaković with British Foreign Secretary David Lammy, 6 May 2025

On 13 February 2023, Konaković spoke in a telephone call with United States Secretary of State Antony Blinken, expressing his gratitude for the United States' "commitment to peace, security and stability of Bosnia and Herzegovina." He attended the 59th Munich Security Conference from 17 to 19 February, during which he met with a number of foreign officials from Spain, Sweden, Austria, France and the United Kingdom.

In May 2023, Konaković announced that a draft on the law regarding the foreign affairs of Bosnia and Herzegovina was adopted unanimously at a Council of Ministers session. He would later say that the session was the "most productive one this Council ever had." On 13 June 2023, Konaković met with British Foreign Secretary James Cleverly during an official visit to the United Kingdom. They discussed bilateral relations between Bosnia and Herzegovina and the United Kingdom, Euro-Atlantic integration, regional relations and global security issues.

In January 2024, U.S. Secretary of State Antony Blinken wrote a letter to Konaković, urging him to "press Croatian Democratic Union leader Dragan Čović to end his obstruction on the realization of the Southern Interconnection natural gas pipeline project between Croatia and Bosnia and Herzegovina."

In February 2025, a motion for Konaković's dismissal was brought by the SDA and the Democratic Front, citing allegations that he is "linked to organised crime and is causing harm to the country's reputation through his actions." Ultimately, the motion failed to achieve a majority in the national House of Representatives, with 15 members voting in favour and 18 against Konaković's removal. In May, Konaković met with British Foreign Secretary David Lammy during the latter's state visit to Bosnia and Herzegovina.

Following the January 2026 United States strikes in Venezuela and the capture of sitting Venezuelan president Nicolás Maduro, the Ministry of Foreign Affairs expressed Bosnia and Herzegovina's support for the "people of Venezuela and for stability in the country and the wider region", calling on "all actors to act rationally, responsibly and with restraint to prevent further escalation and suffering". The Ministry added that "Maduro is a dictator, the world would be a better place without a ruler like him."

The funeral of Bosnian Serb military officer Ratko Mladić in Belgrade prompted a diplomatic dispute between Bosnia and Herzegovina and Serbia. Mladić, who had died on 27 August 2026 in United Nations custody while serving a life sentence for war crimes, crimes against humanity, and genocide committed during the Bosnian War, was returned to Serbia aboard a Serbian government aircraft. Thousands attended his funeral on 7 September, which was presided over by Serbian Patriarch Porfirije. Mladić's coffin was accompanied by Serbian soldiers and a military band, while Defence Minister Bratislav Gašić and Justice Minister Nenad Vujić attended the funeral; President Aleksandar Vučić did not attend. As a result, Konaković announced that all staff under his authority would be withdrawn from the country's embassy in Belgrade except the ambassador and consul, citing "Serbia's handling of the funeral, the military escort and the attendance of government officials." The following day, Konaković declared two Serbian diplomatic representatives in Sarajevo persona non grata: military attaché Milan Dulanović and Darko Maksimović, an adviser to Serbia's Security Intelligence Agency representative at the embassy. Both were given 48 hours to leave Bosnia and Herzegovina.

==== Gaza war ====
Following a large escalation of the Gaza–Israel conflict in October 2023, Konaković condemned Hamas' attacks, but also said that "he never hid his support for the people and the government of Palestine in order to keep and protect the areas they live in, to fight for sovereignty and territorial integrity of their land and protect their religious objects on that area that are of great importance for the faithful from all around the world."

In June 2025, at the 51st Organisation of Islamic Cooperation summit of foreign ministers in Istanbul, Konaković condemned the violence in Gaza and drew parallels to Bosnia and Herzegovina's own experience, stressing the importance of accountability and constitutional order ahead of the 30th anniversary of the Srebrenica genocide.

==== Relations with the European Union ====
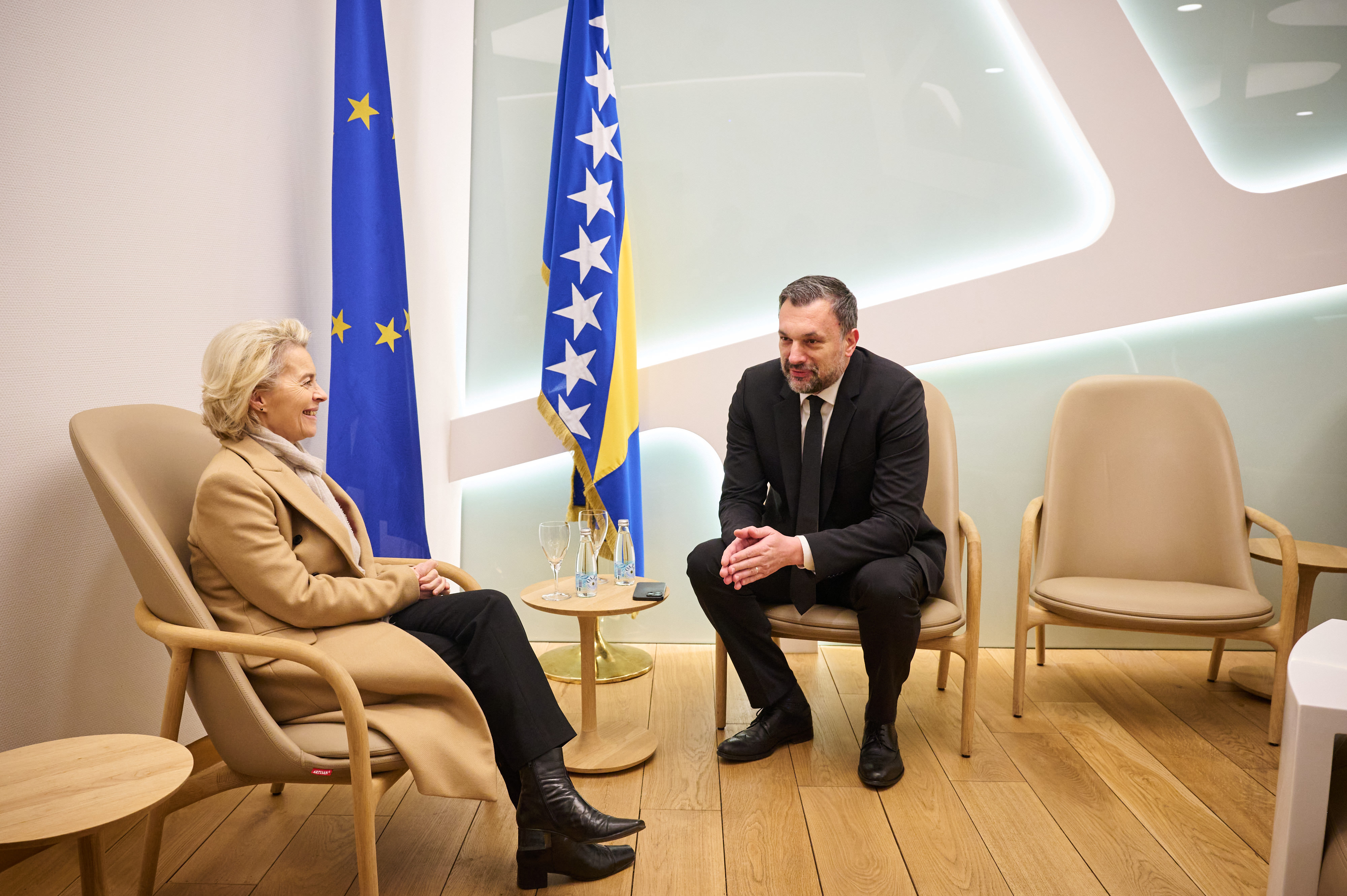
Konaković meeting with European Commission President Ursula von der Leyen, 22 January 2024

After a meeting with the foreign ministers of Italy and Austria on 4 March 2024, Konaković announced that the Council of Ministers of Bosnia and Herzegovina was likely to discuss the Law on the Prevention of Conflict of Interests, one of the main accession-priority reforms set by the European Commission. He noted economic benefits tied to EU support and stressed full alignment with EU foreign policy. On 21 March, at a summit in Brussels, all 27 EU leaders, representing the European Council, unanimously agreed to open EU accession talks with Bosnia and Herzegovina after the Council of Ministers adopted the law on the prevention of conflict of interests and the law on anti-money laundering and countering terrorist financing among other things. Talks are set to begin following the impeding of more reforms.

In May 2025, Konaković addressed the Council of Europe's Committee of Ministers at its 134th session in Luxembourg, emphasising the importance of human rights, the rule of law, and the implementation of judgments of the European Court of Human Rights for Bosnia and Herzegovina's European integration path.

Konaković has frequently reaffirmed Bosnia and Herzegovina's support for the European Union's foreign policy and sanctions framework. In November 2025, he stated that the country "fully supports the EU's sanctions policy on Russia and Belarus", while acknowledging that implementation remains blocked by internal vetoes from Republika Srpska, the Serb-majority entity in Bosnia and Herzegovina. Some months before, he urged more EU member states to impose sanctions on Bosnian Serb leader Milorad Dodik, following Austria and Germany’s entry bans.

== Controversies ==
In April 2024, Bosnian authorities launched Operation "Black Tie 2", targeting a transnational drug trafficking and money laundering network allegedly led by Edin "Tito" Gačanin, described by U.S. officials as "one of the world’s most prolific drug lords". Among those arrested in the operation was Dženis Kadrić, a former officer of the Federal Police Administration in Sarajevo, identified as one of Gačanin’s bodyguards. Passport data belonging to Konaković and his family were found on Kadrić’s confiscated devices. Investigators' transcripts indicated that Kadrić sent a note with the passport numbers of Konaković and his daughter.

Further messages referred to Konaković’s party, People and Justice (NiP). The cartel allegedly proposed direct cooperation with the party leadership; if rejected, they discussed forming a rival party to strengthen political influence in Bosnia and Herzegovina. By July 2025, the Prosecutor's Office of Bosnia and Herzegovina ordered the State Investigation and Protection Agency (SIPA) to conduct a detailed financial investigation of NiP as part of the broader "Black Tie" case. SIPA confirmed it was investigating whether NiP received funds originating from Gačanin’s cartel.

== Personal life ==
Konaković has been married to Al Jazeera Balkans journalist Dalija Hasanbegović since 2016, and together they have two daughters, Kiana Aja and Kaira Nur. He was previously married with models Aida Osmanović and then with Martina Saira Keškić, divorcing the latter in 2014.

Besides his native Bosnian, Konaković speaks English fluently and is conversant in Italian and Romanian.

== See also ==
- List of current foreign ministers
- List of foreign ministers in 2023
- List of foreign ministers in 2024
- List of foreign ministers in 2025

Political offices
Preceded by Bisera Turković	Minister of Foreign Affairs; 2023–present	Incumbent
