= Simon Juach Deng =

South Sudanese diplomat

A portrait of Ambassador Simon Juach Deng

Simon Juach Deng is a South Sudanese politician and diplomat. He is currently the Head of Mission of the Embassy of South Sudan in Nairobi, Kenya. Ambassador Juach replaced Anthony Louis Kon in a presidential decree issued by the President of South Sudan in August 2026.

== Early life and education ==
Simon Juach, a former child soldier, previously served as a humanitarian worker with several organizations before transitioning to politics.

== Career ==
In October 2022, Simon Juach was appointed Head of Mission of the Republic of South Sudan to Uganda. He replaced Simon Duku.

Before his appointment as South Sudan Ambassador to the Republic of Uganda, Simon Juach worked as director of the Department of China Affairs at the Ministry of Foreign Affairs and International Cooperation.

In July 2023, Juach revealed that South Sudan would import electric power from the neighboring Uganda before the country transitions into a general election expected at the end of 2024. During the celebration of South Sudan Independence Day in Kampala, Juach called on South Sudanese people living in Uganda to embrace peace and unity and help in the economic recovery of the country from conflict.

However, in April 2024, Juach was appointed as Executive Director in the Office of the President of South Sudan where he served for five months. He was removed in a presidential decree in October 2024 and replaced by Dominic Juk Chom.

In a similar decree, President Kiir named Juach as Head of Mission of the Republic of South Sudan to Zimbabwe, a position he served until August 2026 prior to his appointment as South Sudan Ambassador to the Republic of Kenya.
