= Beatrice Wani-Noah =

South Sudanese politician

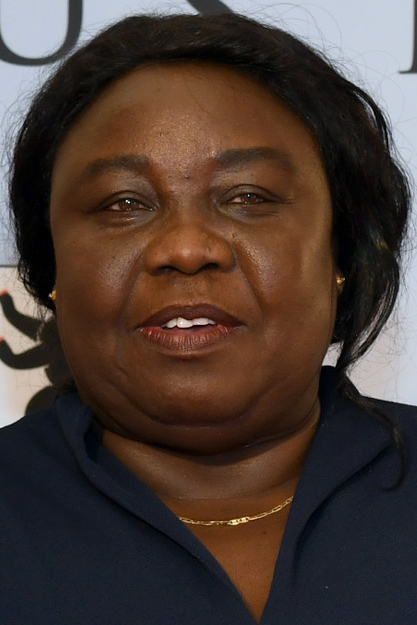

Minister of Foreign Affairs and International Cooperation of South Sudan
- In office 12 March 2020 – 9 September 2021
- Preceded by: Awut Deng Acuil
- Succeeded by: Mayiik Ayii Deng

Personal details
- Born: July 28, 1959 (age 67)

Beatrice Khamisa Wani-Noah (born 28 July 1959) is a South Sudanese politician who served as minister of Foreign Affairs and International cooperation from 2020 to 2021.

== Early life and education ==
Wani-Noah was born on the 28 of July 1959 in Morobo County, Central Equatoria state. She has a Masters of Arts in international relations from the United States International University in Nairobi and a postgraduate diploma in Land and Water Management from Cranfield Institute of Technology in the United Kingdom.

== Career ==
Wani-Noah worked for the United Nations Economic Commission for Africa from 1994 until 2003. She has held appointments in the Government of South Sudan since 2006, as Director General for Multilateral Relations in the Ministry of Regional Cooperation (2006-2010), Undersecretary in the Ministry of Peace and CPA Implementation (2010-2011) and Deputy Minister of Telecommunications and Postal Services (2011-2013).

Wani-Noah was appointed South Sudan's ambassador to the Democratic Republic of the Congo in 2014, and then served as South Sudan's ambassador to Germany from March 2018.

Wani-Noah was appointed Foreign Minister by President] Salva Kiir in his new unity government on 12 March 2020, replacing Awut Deng Acuil. She was unable to attend the official swearing in ceremony on 16 March as she was in self-isolation after returning to Juba from a country with a confirmed case of COVID-19. She was relieved of her position on 9 September 2021.

== Personal life ==
Wani-Noah is married and has two daughters.
