= Barnaba Marial Benjamin =

South Sudanese politician

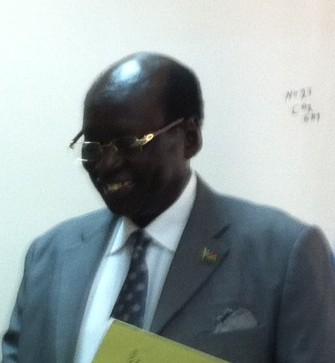
- Barnaba Marial Benjamin in 2013

Minister of Foreign Affairs of South Sudan
- In office 27 July 2013 – 23 March 2016
- Preceded by: Nhial Deng Nhial
- Succeeded by: Deng Alor Kuol

Personal details
- Born: 3 February 1957 (age 69)
- Party: SPLM
- Education: University of Khartoum; University of Cairo; London School of Hygiene & Tropical Medicine; University of South Africa

Barnaba Marial Benjamin Bil (born 3 February 1957) is a South Sudanese politician. He was appointed in April 2021 as the minister of Presidential Affairs in the office of the President as of 2022 replacing Nhial Deng Nhial.

Barnaba Marial Benjamin is the former Minister of Foreign Affairs and International Cooperation in the Cabinet of South Sudan. He was appointed to that position on 27 July 2013.

He has held various positions in the Cabinet of South Sudan since independence in 2005. He was information minister from 2010 to 2013.

== Education and early life ==
Benjamin has professional training in medicine and diplomacy. He studied Premedical Sciences at the University of Khartoum in 1965 and graduated in Medicine and Surgery at the University of Cairo in 1970. He studied Hygiene and Tropical medicine at the London School of Hygiene & Tropical Medicine in 1983. At the Centre for African Reconnaissance (CARS), University of South Africa (UNISA), Pretoria South Africa in 2005, he studied Diplomacy and International Relations. He also attended the SPLM\SPLA Institute of Ideology and Strategic studies, Zink, Gambela, Ethiopia - 1984–1985. Before the Liberation struggle days, he worked in various Provincial and District hospitals in Wau and Yirol. He was also a Senior Registrar in General Surgery in both Khartoum and Omdurman University Teaching Hospitals.

== Career ==
Prior to joining the Ministry of Foreign Affairs and International Cooperation, Barnaba Marial Benjamin served in the same capacity in the ministries of Information and Broadcasting as well as Commerce and Industry (MCI) in the then Government of South Sudan (GOSS) up to June 2010. Previously, he was minister for Regional Cooperation (MRC) Government of South Sudan (GOSS) 2006-May 2009 Juba. He also served as the State Minister of International Cooperation, Government of National Unity, Khartoum, Sudan. 2005- 2006. He was an SPLM member in SPLM\Sudan Government Peace Talks- Nairobi 1989 and is an SPLM member of the National Liberation council up to date. He is also a Member of Parliament (MP) in the South Sudan National Legislative Assembly representing a Constituency in Jonglei State.

The Minister held various positions in the liberation struggle, including serving as SPLM\ SPLA Treasurer General for SPLM- London Committee 1983-1987 and SPLM representative to Southern African Countries (SADC), Harare, Zimbabwe 1988–2005. He was also the Special envoy for the SPLM\SPLA Chairman to Southern African countries from between 1991 and 2004. He held the position of Secretary of International Relations Representing SPLM in the Executive of National Democratic Alliance (NDA), 2002–2005, and has been a member of national Liberation Council (NLC), SPLM to date.

== See also ==
- SPLM
- SPLA
- Cabinet of South Sudan
