= Mayiik Ayii Deng =

South Sudanese politician

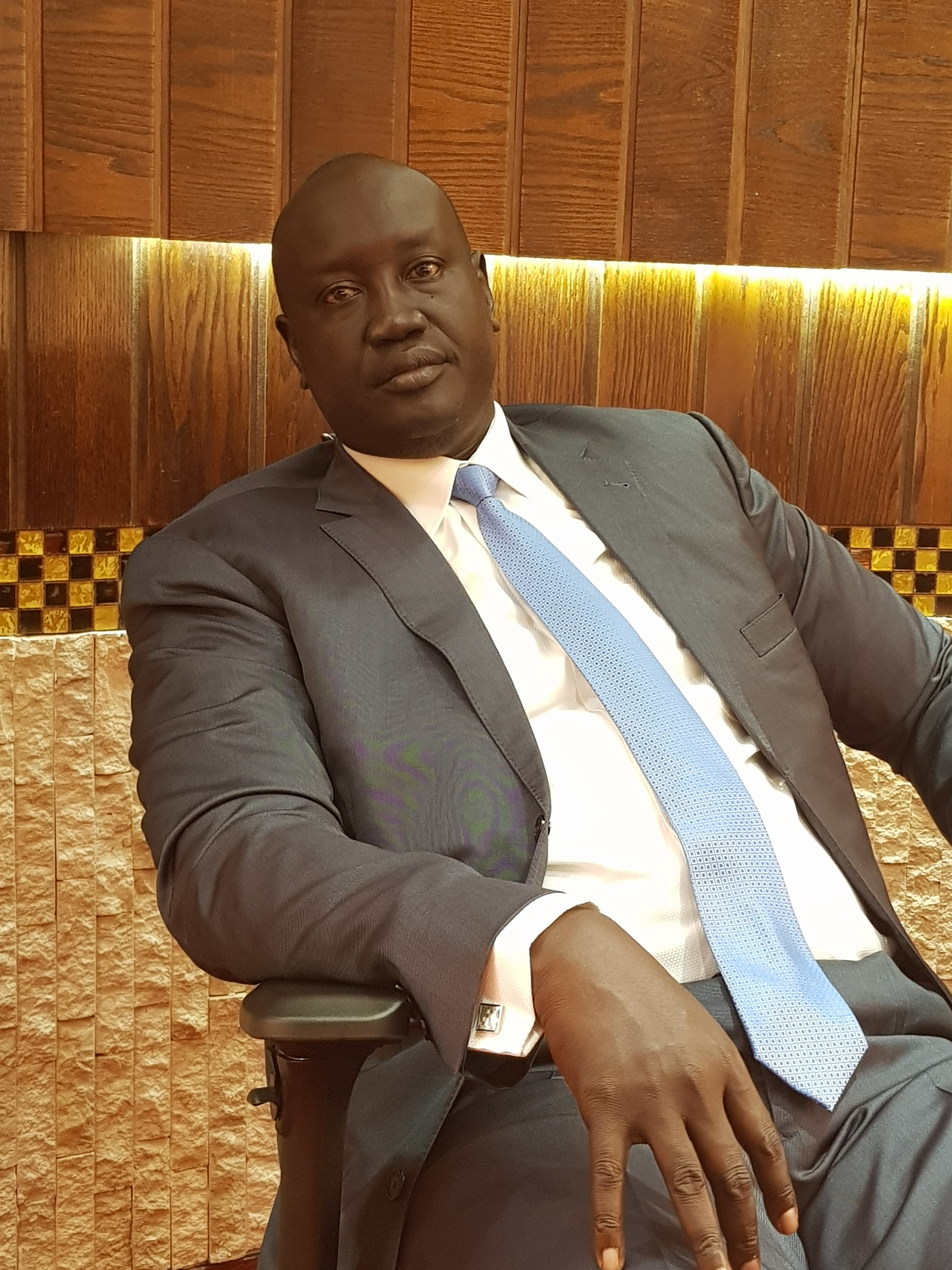

Former Minister of Foreign Affairs and International Cooperation of South Sudan
- In office September 2021 – 8 March 2023
- President: Salva Kiir
- Preceded by: Beatrice Wani-Noah
- Succeeded by: James Pitia Morgan

Personal details
- Born: 20 December 1971 (age 54) Wau, former Bhar el Ghazal Province
- Party: SPLM
- Education: Saint Mary's University; Loras College

Mayiik Ayii Deng is a South Sudanese politician and a former Minister of Foreign Affairs and International Cooperation, He was appointed into the office following Republican decree by the President removing Beatrice Khamisa Wani in September 2021 and was fired in March 2023.

He had also served as the Minister of presidential affairs in the Revitalized Transitional Government of National Unity (R-TGoNU). Mr. Deng was appointed minister in the Office of the President on 29 April 2016, following the signing of the Agreement on the Resolution of Conflict in the Republic of South Sudan (ARCISS) and the formation of the transitional Government of National Unity (TGoNU, a position he held until he was reappointed as Minister of Presidential Affairs in March 2020 and subsequently relieved in June 2020 in that latest position

Mr. Deng participated in the South Sudan peace process in various capacities since independence in 2011. He was part of the SPLM negotiating team in Arusha, Tanzania in 2014 during the negotiation of SPLM Reunification.

== Early life and education ==
Mr. Mayiik Ayii Deng was born on 20 December 1971 in what was then the Bahr el Ghazal Province in Sudan and now South Sudan.

He has professional training in International Relations and diplomacy. He holds a Bachelor of Arts Degree in Political Science and History from Loras College in Dubuque, Iowa. and Masters of Arts in Management (IP) from Saint Mary's University in Minneapolis, Minnesota.

== Career ==
Prior to joining the Office of the President of the Republic of South Sudan as the Minister in the Office of the President, Mr. Deng was an active basketball player. He went to the United States of America in the 1990s under the US High School Basketball scholarship program where he joined Winston – Salem State University in North Carolina while at the same time played in numerous inter-estates basketball competitions. Mr. Deng is also a member of parliament (MP) in the South Sudan Transitional National Legislative Assembly (TNLA) representing Tonj North constituency in Warrap State on the SPLM Party List ticket.

== Gallery ==
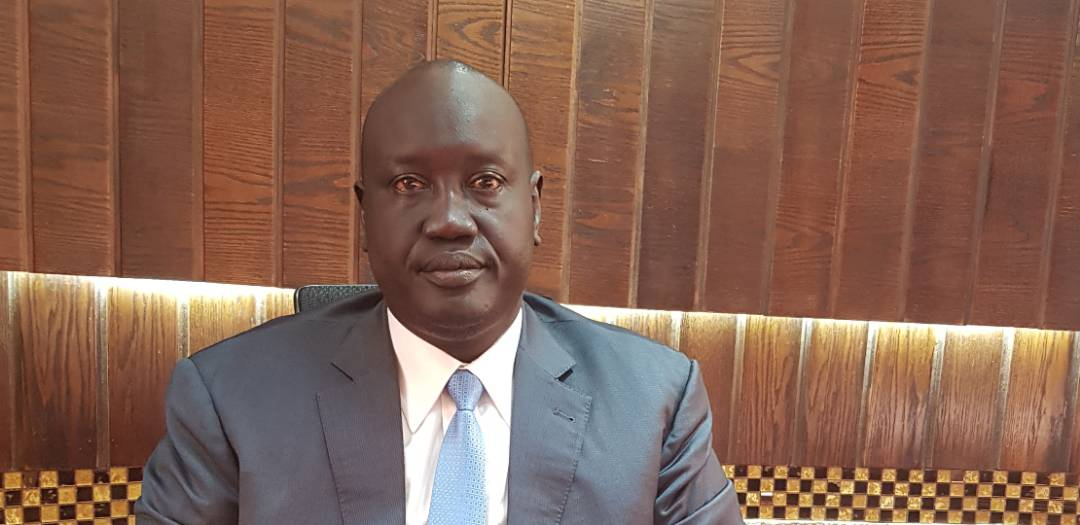
Hon Deng in his office

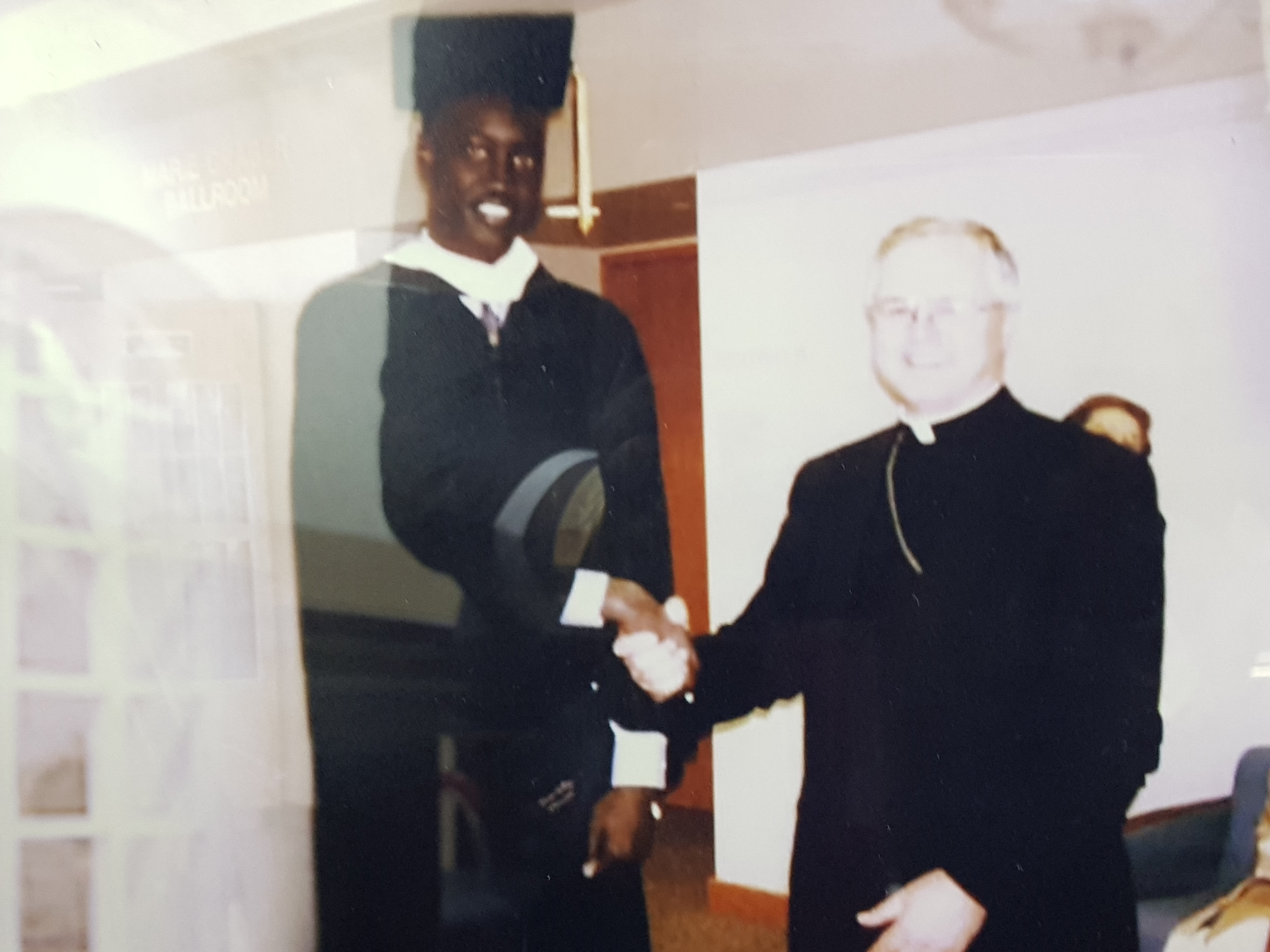
Hon Deng's graduation photo, 2001

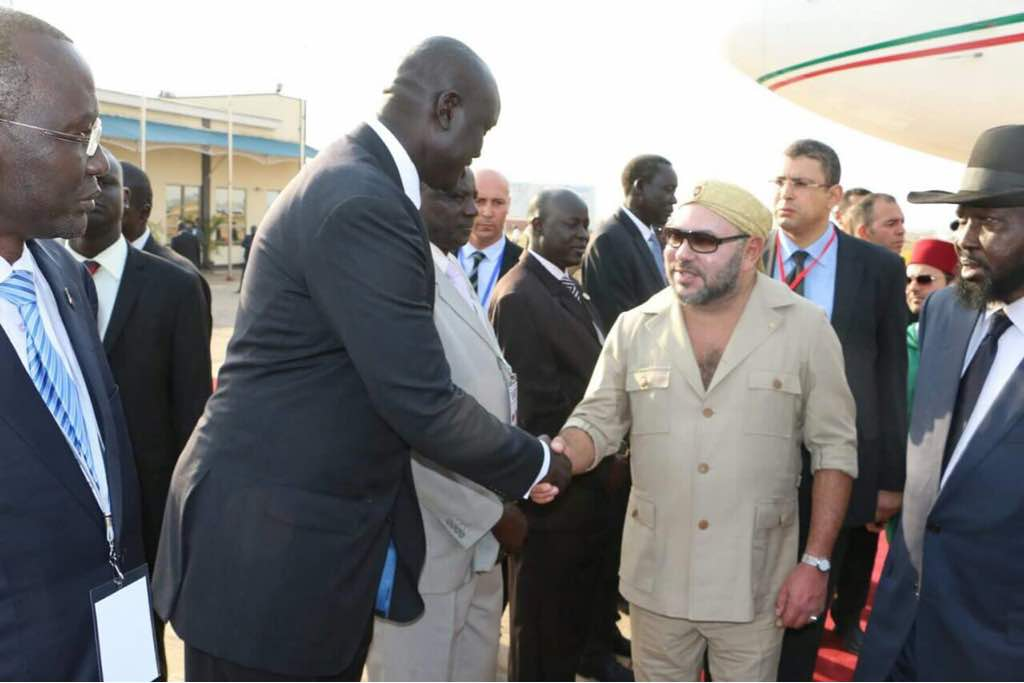
Hon Deng with H.M. King Mohamed VI of Morocco

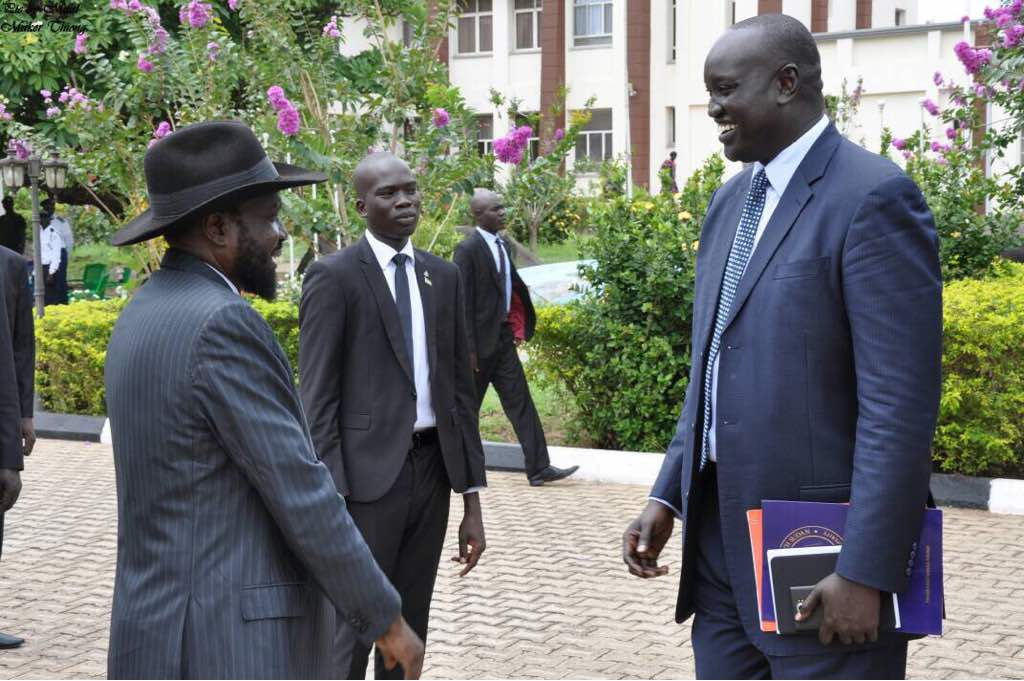
Hon. Deng with President Kiir

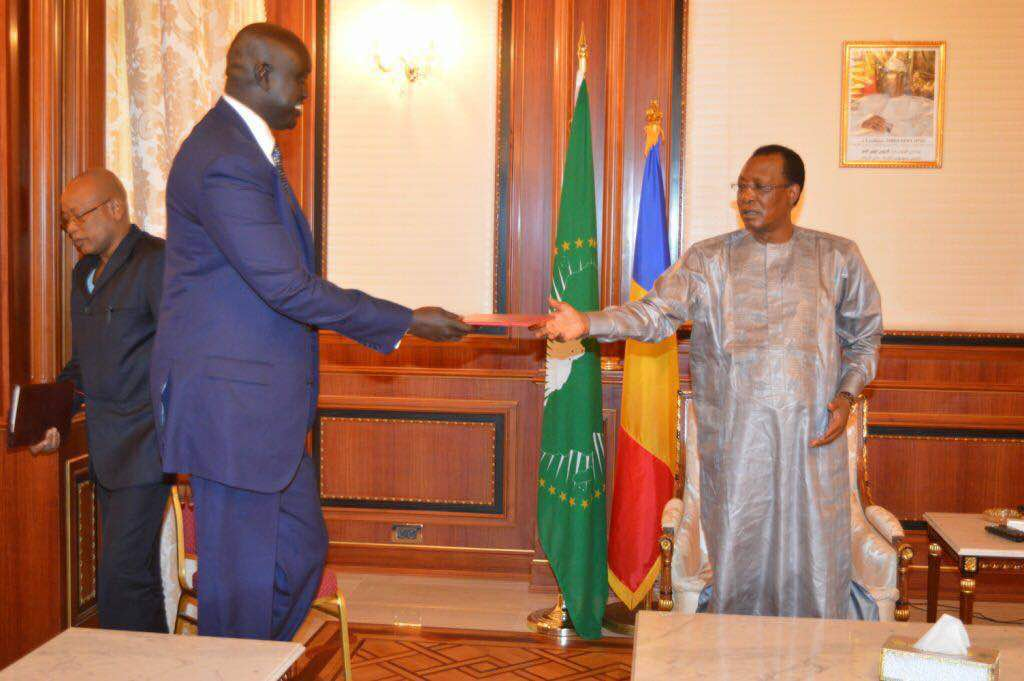
Hon. Deng with H.E. President Deby of Chad

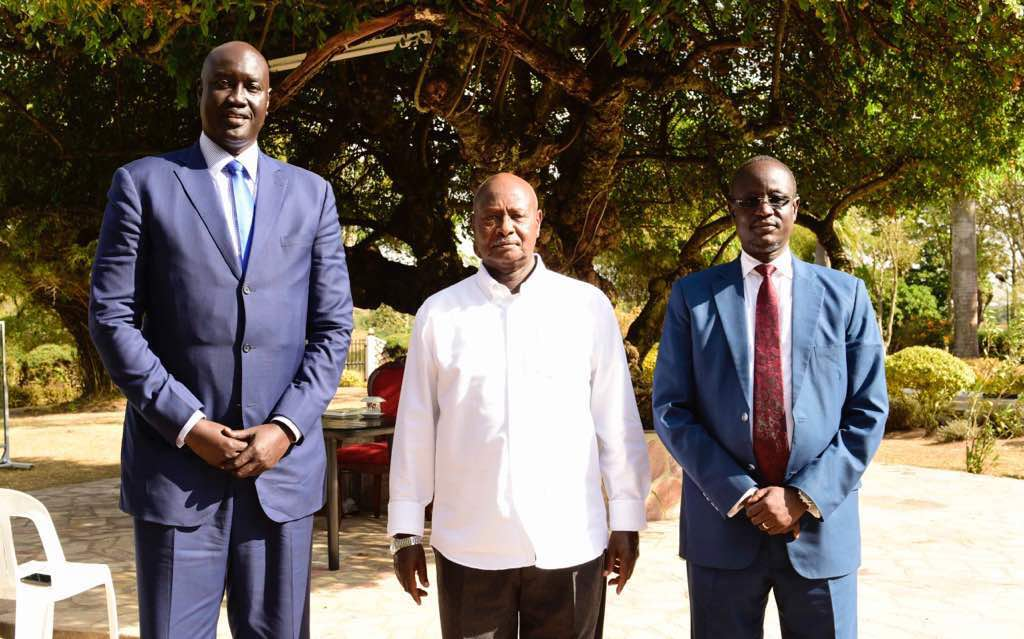
Hon Deng with President Yoweri Museveni

== See also ==
- SPLM
- SPLA
- Cabinet of South Sudan
