= Monday Semaya Kumba =

South Sudanese politician

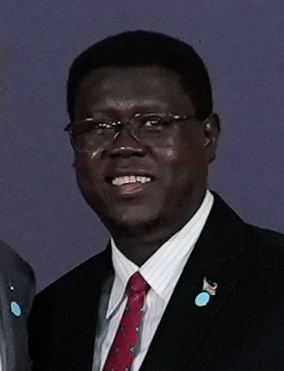

Minister of Foreign Affairs and International Cooperation
- In office 10 April 2025 – 29 April 2026
- Preceded by: Ramadan Mohamed Abdallah Goc
- Succeeded by: James Pitia Morgan

Monday Semaya Kumba is a South Sudanese politician. He was appointed Minister of Foreign Affairs and International Cooperation in April 2025, having succeeded Ramadan Mohamed Abdallah Goc. On 29 April 2026, Kumba was replaced by James Pitia Morgan as the foreign minister.
