= Péter Szijjártó =

Hungarian politician

Péter Szijjártó MP
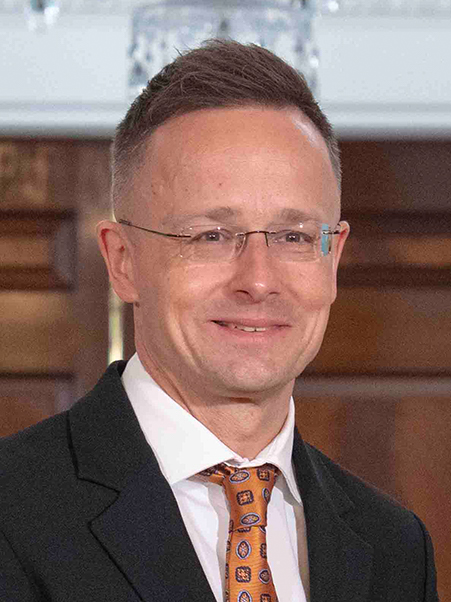
- Szijjártó in 2025

Minister of Foreign Affairs and Trade
- In office 23 September 2014 – 12 May 2026
- Prime Minister: Viktor Orbán
- Deputy: László Szabó (2014–2017)
- Preceded by: Tibor Navracsics
- Succeeded by: Anita Orbán (as Minister of Foreign Affairs)

President of the Committee of Ministers of the Council of Europe
- In office 21 May 2021 – 17 November 2021
- Preceded by: Heiko Maas
- Succeeded by: Luigi Di Maio

Member of the National Assembly
- In office 15 May 2002 – 15 July 2026

Personal details
- Born: 30 October 1978 (age 48) Komárom, Hungary
- Party: Fidesz
- Spouse: Szilvia Szijjártó (m. 2009)
- Children: 2
- Education: Corvinus University (MA)
- Website: Government website

Péter Szijjártó (Note: Hungarian pronunciation: [ˈpeːtɛr ˈsijːaːrtoː]) (born 30 October 1978) is a Hungarian politician who served as the Minister of Foreign Affairs and Trade from 2014 to 2026. He previously served as Deputy Minister of Foreign Affairs and Trade and Parliamentary State Secretary of the Ministry of Foreign Affairs and Trade. In June 2012, he was appointed to State Secretary for Foreign Affairs and External Economic Relations of the Prime Minister's Office.

Szijjártó joined Fidesz in 1998. He was elected to member of the municipal government in the same year in the city of Győr, and then he obtained a mandate between 2006 and 2010 again. In 2005 he was elected to president of Fidelitas, the youth organization of Fidesz and he occupied this position until 2009. He first became a member of the National Assembly in 2002. He received mandates in 2006, 2010, 2014, 2018, 2022 and 2026 as well.

In December 2021, Szijjártó was awarded the Order of Friendship from Russian Foreign Minister Sergey Lavrov, becoming just the second Western foreign minister to be awarded it after U.S. Secretary of State Rex Tillerson, who at the time had not yet been appointed to his position. In 2026, multiple phone calls appearing to show Szijjártó speaking with Russian foreign Minister Sergey Lavrov were leaked, which prompted strong criticism from several European Union leaders for serving Russian interests.

== Early life ==
Péter Szijjártó was born in Komárom on 30 October 1978. After spending a half year in the United States, he finished his secondary studies at Czuczor Gergely Benedictine Secondary Grammar School of Győr in 1997. He graduated from the Budapest University of Economic Sciences and Public Administration (today Corvinus University of Budapest) majoring in international relations and sports management.

== Career ==
=== As municipal politician (1998–2010) ===
Szijjártó began his political career in 1998, when he was elected as the youngest member of the Municipal Assembly of Győr. He served as vice chairman of the education, culture and sports committee. He was one of the founders and the first president of the Fidelitas, youth organization of Fidesz in Győr. He was elected a vice president of the Fidelitas 2001, and also became a member of the Fidesz's national board.

=== As National Assemblyman (2002–present) ===
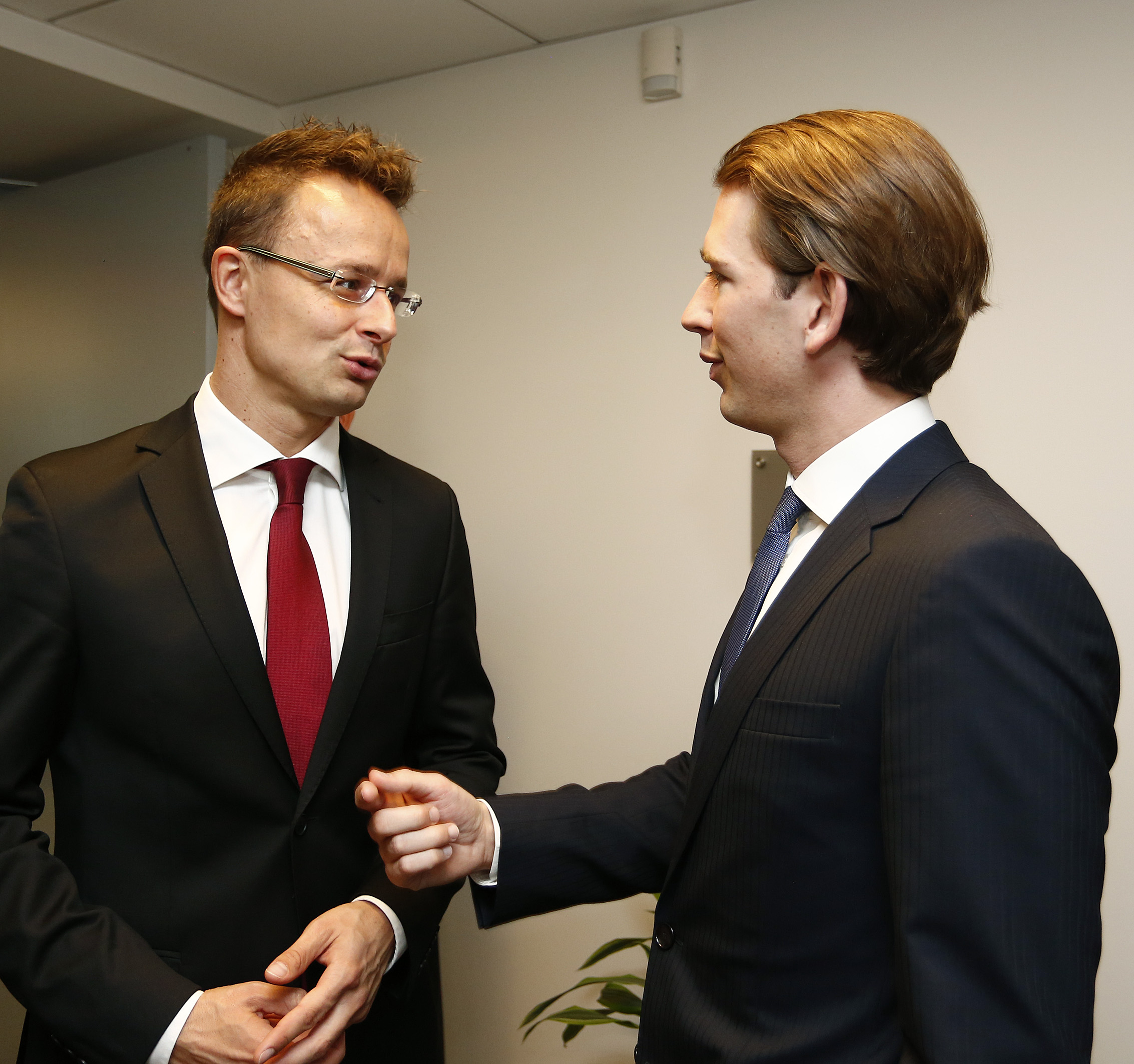
Szijjártó with Austrian Foreign Minister Sebastian Kurz in 2015

Szijjártó has been a member of the National Assembly of Hungary since 2002. He was the youngest Member of the Parliament from 2002 to 2006. He was appointed Vice Chairman of the Committee on Youth and Sport Affairs in 2004, holding the office until 2006. He was elected President of the Fidelitas in 2005, replacing András Gyürk. He also became the leader of the Győr branch of Fidesz. He held the position of Fidelitas leader until 2009, when Péter Ágh was nominated as the new president.

Before Fidesz came to power in May 2010, Szijjártó was the spokesman of Fidesz – Hungarian Civic Union. He served as personal spokesman of the Hungarian Prime Minister Viktor Orbán from 2010 to 2012.

On 4 July 2012 Orbán nominated Szijjártó as the chairman of eight economic committees to boost the Hungarian government's policy of opening up trade with countries to the east as well as consolidating Hungary's role in supporting the Western Balkan nations' EU integration, the Central European Visegrád Group of heads of government announced the same day. Szijjártó, who had taken up the post on 2 July, also worked to strengthen co-operation with neighbouring countries.

=== As Foreign Minister (2014–2026) ===
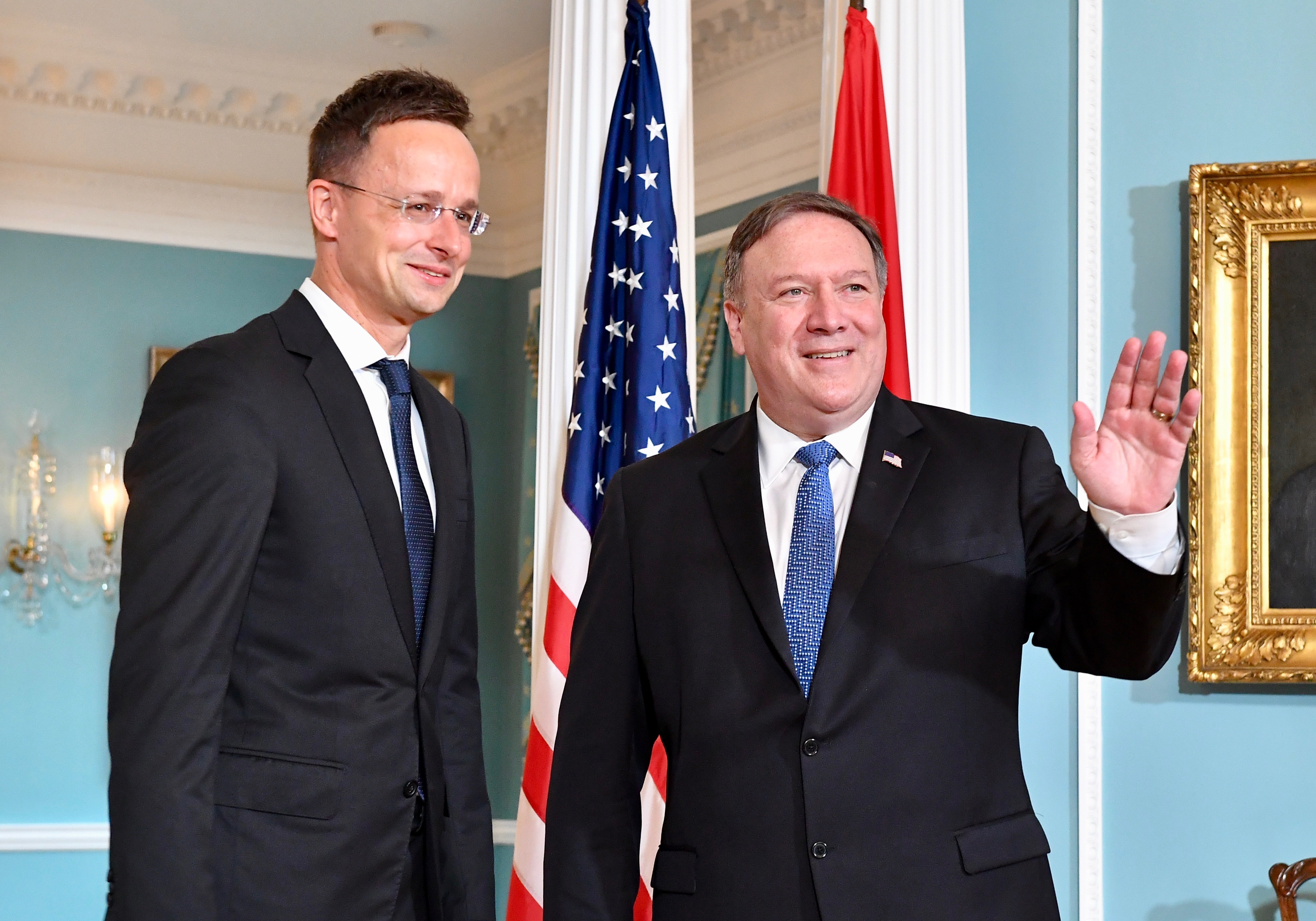
Szijjártó with U.S. Secretary of State Mike Pompeo in 2018

Prime Minister Viktor Orbán appointed Szijjártó as Minister of Foreign Affairs and Trade in September 2014, when his predecessor Tibor Navracsics resigned due to his new position in the European Commission.

==== 2015 ====
During a breakfast meeting of the Israel Council on Foreign Relations in Jerusalem on 16 November 2015, Szijjártó said that Hungary would not place the settlements labeling on products originating from the West Bank. This decision followed the Notice adopted by the European Commission on 11 November 2015, incorporating guidelines to label imports from the Israeli settlements. He considered the aforementioned policy to be "irrational," and even threatening to a potential Israeli-Palestinian dialogue. Szijjártó also addressed the contemporary European migration crisis, describing mass migration as "the greatest challenge that the EU has had to face since its foundation" and condemning European leaders for the misguided policies their political correctness engendered.

==== 2020 ====
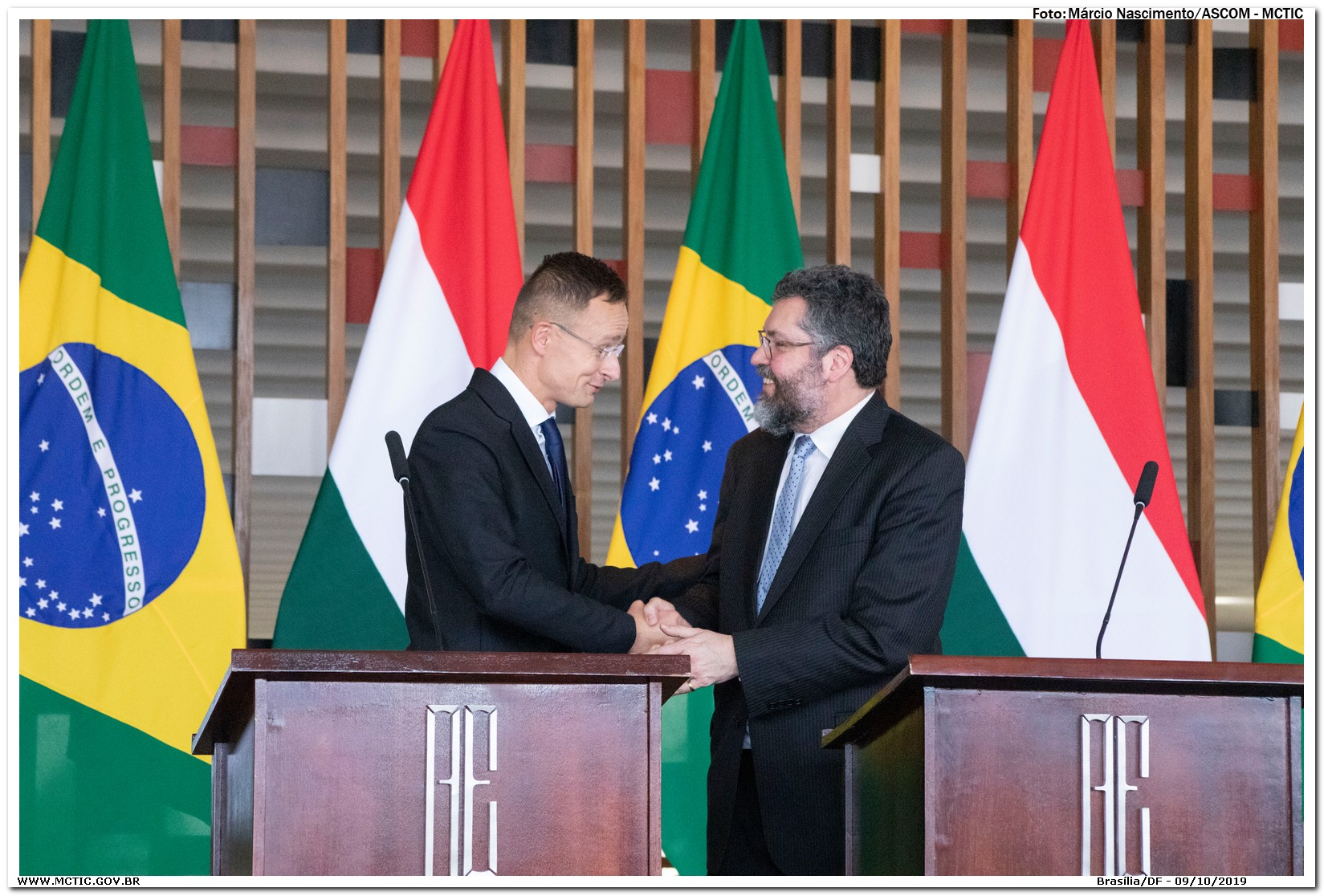
Szijjártó with Brazilian Foreign Minister Ernesto Araújo on 8 October 2019

Szijjártó visited Cambodia on 3 November 2020 to hold several meetings with high-ranking government officials, and tested positive for COVID-19 the following day after flying to Bangkok. Four close contacts in Cambodia subsequently tested positive, which prompted government officials from 13 Cambodian government ministries, including Prime Minister Hun Sen, to enter quarantine, and contact tracing efforts were made to seven provinces and tests administered on around 1,000 people. Cambodian authorities closed schools, museums, cinemas, entertainment venues, gyms, beer gardens across Phnom Penh for two weeks. Local media reported that the Hungarian Foreign Ministry had requested for no temperature checks, mandatory mask wearing and alcohol spraying ahead of the meetings.

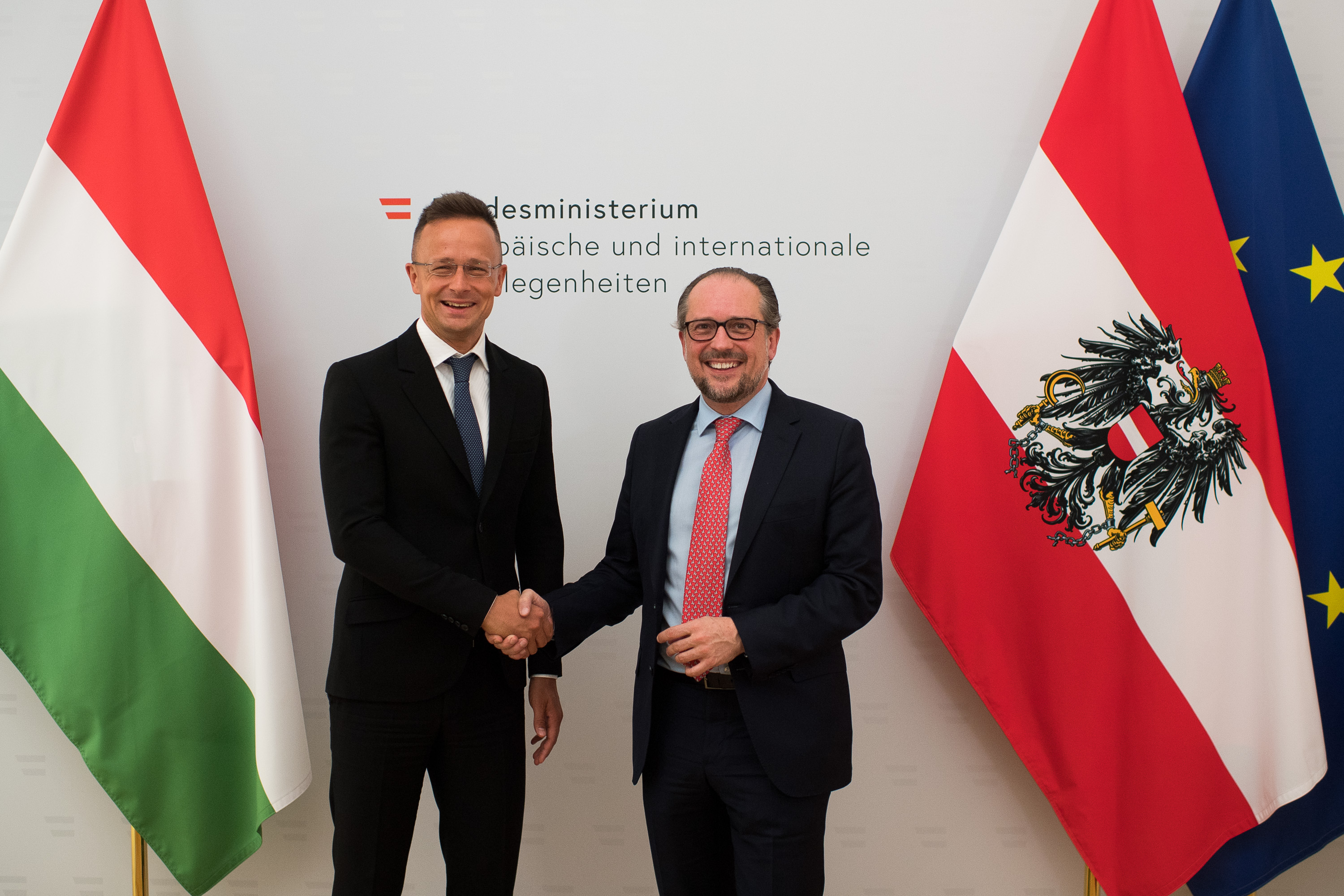
Szijjártó with Austrian Foreign Minister Alexander Schallenberg on 14 July 2022

==== 2021 ====
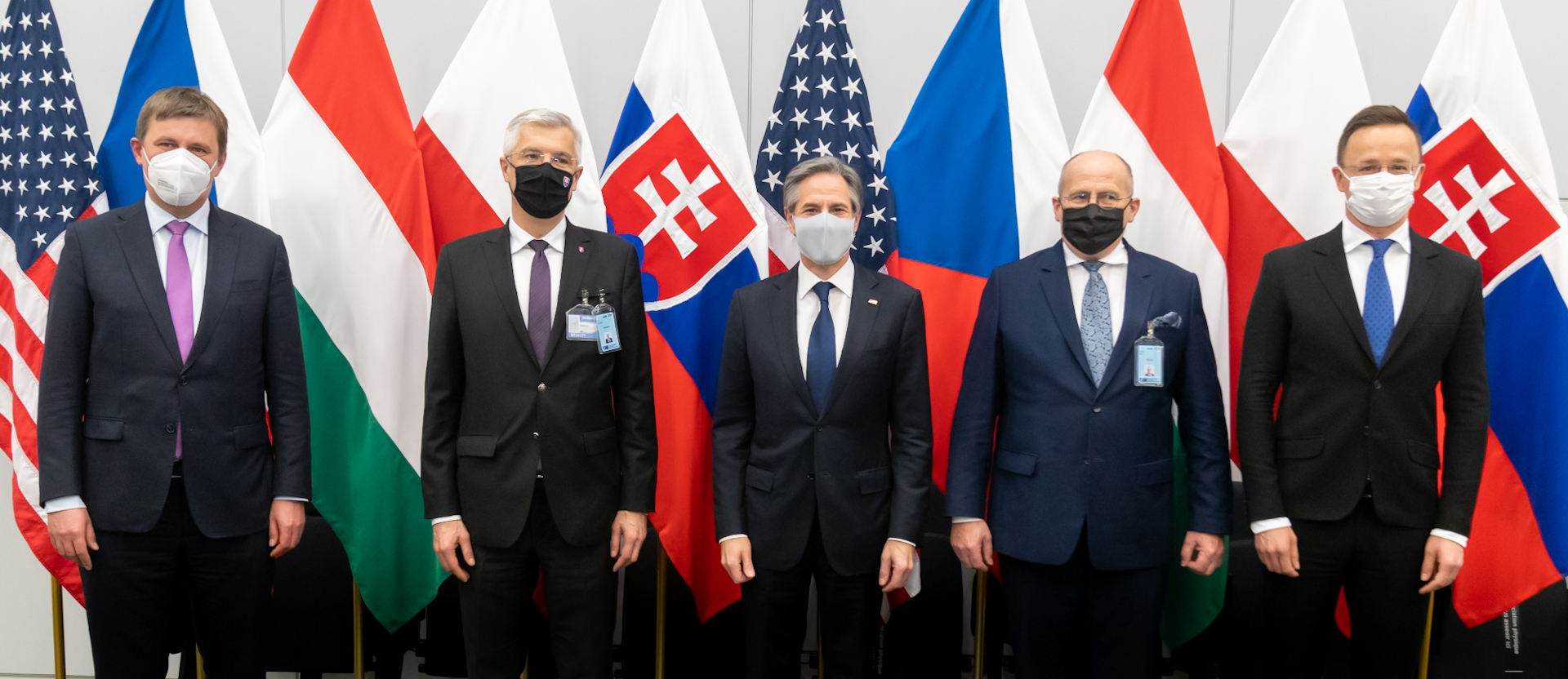
Szijjártó with U.S. Secretary of State Antony Blinken in 2021

On 16 October 2021 Szijjártó was interviewed by Al Jazeera English during which time he was forced to defend his government's policies from attacks by Ursula von der Leyen and Mark Rutte. He explained his Parliament's law on the rights of the parent and child to security against what he referred to as bizarre ideologies and highlighted the preference of his government for referendums to settle outstanding political issues. He clarified that the George Soros-founded and -funded Central European University needed to meet the criteria set out in Hungarian law regarding domestic content and staff that all other Hungarian universities need to meet in order to certify degrees in Hungary, rather than have it be an outlier.

==== 2023 ====
Szijjártó expressed support for Israel during the Gaza war. He criticized South Africa's genocide case against Israel, saying that accusing a "country that has suffered a terrorist attack of genocide is obviously nonsense."

==== 2025 ====
Szijjártó expressed his support for the government of Serbia during the student-led anti-corruption protests, accusing the protesters of wanting to destabilize Serbia.

==== 2026 ====
In March 2026, Szijjártó told that he called Russian foreign minister Sergey Lavrov before and after EU meetings. He had visited Moscow, including meeting with Vladimir Putin, 16 times since the start of the 2022 Russian invasion of Ukraine.

The same month, The Insider released a recording of a phone call between Szijjártó and Lavrov from August 2024, where Lavrov reminded him to ask for Gulbahor Ismailova, the sister of Alisher Usmanov, to be removed from the list of persons under European Union sanctions. In another call, he allegedly told Lavrov "I am always at your disposal." He also appeared to offer to send Lavrov a document about Ukraine's European Union accession. Poland and Ireland referred to the apparent leaked audio as "repulsive" and "sinister".

In July 2026, following Fidesz' loss in the election, Szijjártó announced he had resigned his parliamentary mandate to become an executive at Chinese automaker BYD. Previously, he had been a negotiator with BYD as it sought to open a factory in Szeged.

== Honours ==
=== Orders ===
Award or decoration	Country	Date	Place
Order of Honour	Moldova	7 December 2020	Chișinău
Order of the Serbian Flag	Serbia	29 June 2021	Belgrade
Order of Friendship	Russia	30 December 2021	Moscow
Order Dostuk	Kyrgyzstan	3 May 2022	Bishkek

== See also ==
- List of foreign ministers in 2017
- List of foreign ministers in 2018
- List of foreign ministers in 2019
- List of foreign ministers in 2020
- List of foreign ministers in 2021
- List of foreign ministers in 2022
- List of foreign ministers in 2023
- List of foreign ministers in 2024
- List of foreign ministers in 2025
- List of current foreign ministers

== Notes ==
Party political offices
Preceded by András Gyürk	Leader of Fidelitas; 2005–2009	Succeeded by Péter Ágh
Political offices
Preceded by Tibor Navracsics	Minister of Foreign Affairs and Trade; 2014–2026	Succeeded by Anita Orbán
