= Ministry of Foreign Affairs and International Cooperation (South Sudan) =

Government ministry of South Sudan

Republic of South Sudan Ministry of Foreign Affairs and International Cooperation

Department overview
- Formed: 2011
- Jurisdiction: South Sudan
- Headquarters: Juba South Sudan
- Employees: 4,000
- Annual budget: $700M
- Minister responsible: Hon. James Pitia Morgan
- Department executives: Amb.Monday Semaya Kumba />Deputy Minister; Amb.Agnes A. Osawo Undersecretary
- Website: mofaic.gov.ss

The Ministry of Foreign Affairs and International Cooperation is a cabinet-level government ministry responsible for the implementation and management of South Sudan's foreign policy and international activity. The incumbent minister is Monday Simaya Kumba since 2025.

== List of ministers ==
This is a list of ministers of foreign affairs and international cooperation of South Sudan:

No.	Name (Birth–Death)	Portrait	Tenure
1	Deng Alor Kuol		2011
2	Nhial Deng Nhial (b. 1957)		2011–2013
—	Charles Manyang d'Awol (b. 1948) Acting Minister		2013
3	Barnaba Marial Benjamin		2013–2016
—	Bashir Gbandi Acting Minister		2016
(1)	Deng Alor Kuol		2016–2018
—	Martin Elia Lomuro Acting Minister		2018
(2)	Nhial Deng Nhial (b. 1957)		2018–2019
4	Awut Deng Acuil		2019–2020
5	Beatrice Wani-Noah (b. 1959)		2020–2021
6	Mayiik Ayii Deng (b. 1971)		2021–2023
—	Joseph Makuer Nyieth (b. 1978)		2023
8	James Pitia Morgan		2023–26 April, 2024
9	Ramadan Mohamed Abdallah Goc		26 April 2024–10 April 2025
10	Monday Semaya Kumba		10 April 2025-29 April 2026
11	James Pitia Morgan		29 April 2026

== See also ==
- Cabinet of South Sudan
