= Deng Alor Kuol =

South Sudanese politician

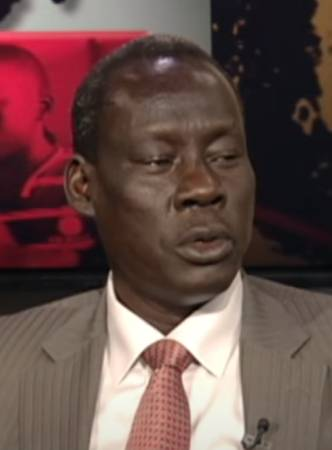
Deng Alor Kuol in 2013

Deng Alor Kuol (Arabic: دينق ألور) is a South Sudanese politician. He has served as the minister of East African Community Affairs in President Salva Kiir's government. He is a member of the Ngok Dinka ethnic group, and was born in Abyei region, an oil-producing border region between Northern and Southern Sudan.

He is also Uncle to Achai Wiir, a South Sudanese renowned businesswomen.

In October 2007, Alor was appointed Foreign Minister of Sudan, replacing Lam Akol, in what was seen as an attempt to appease the Sudanese People's Liberation Movement. Alor had previously been minister of cabinet affairs in Khartoum's national unity government. Alor remained Sudan's foreign minister until 2010.

After the independence of South Sudan, he briefly served as minister of foreign affairs until being removed by President Kiir, being appointed to that position on 10 July 2011. Alor was one of 10 senior SPLM officials arrested by Salva Kiir in December 2013 but later released.

In July 2020, President Kiir appointed Deng Alor Kuol to the vacant East African affairs ministry, replacing the late John Luk Jok, who died in June 2020.

== South Sudanese politics ==
Alor, a member of the SPLM Former Detainees said there’s need to reconcile and unite the SPLM to end the suffering of the people.

“I want us to unite. I want us to complete the peace process, if you look at the people who are still outside are SPLM, whether is General Paul Malong, Thomas Cirilo or Pagan Amum, you count them they are all SPLM,” he said.

In December 2013, political differences within the ruling party SPLM escalating into a deadly civil war that has killed hundreds of thousands and displaced millions into refugees’ camps.

Following the 2013 conflict, multiple factions bearing the name SPLM broke away from the main party, and are operating as independent political parties.

These include the SPLM-IO, SPLM Former Detainees, SPLM-IO-Kitgwang, and Real-SPLM, among others.

The parties to the 7 years of conflict are struggling to implement a peace agreement signed in 2018.

However, Alor says, to implement the extension plan, the R-TGONU must bring to the round-table, all the holdout group to be part of this peace process.

“I want us to reconcile and bring these comrades back and unite our ranks we have differed enough our differences have cost a lot of suffering to the people of South Sudan and it’s about time for us to apologize to the people of South Sudan and to reconcile and unite the SPLM.”, said Alor.

The holdout groups who are not part of the 2018 peace agreement are General Thomas Cirillo of the National Salvation Front, and Stephen Buay Rolnyang of the South Sudan People’s Movement.

Other holdout factions in the opposition coalition – South Sudan Opposition Movements Alliance are Pagan Amum of the Real SPLM and Paul Malong Awan, leader of the South Sudan United Front.

For his part, the Minister of Higher Education, Science and Technology, said the roadmap should now include the holdout groups in the peace process.

Gabriel Chansong Chang said the Rome peace need to be incorporated to the Revitalized agreement to have a comprehensive dialogue that will pave way for development in the county.

“The other issue which is important is that we have the holdout groups, Rome initiative is ongoing. We want the Rome initiative to be concluded successfully so that we have a comprehensive peace agreement so that there will be no people in the forest to disturb us and thereafter we go for development.”

== See also ==
- SPLM
- SPLA
- Cabinet of South Sudan
- List of foreign ministers in 2017

Preceded by Lam Akol	Foreign Minister of Republic of Sudan; 2007–2010	Succeeded by Ali Ahmed Karti
