= Ramadan Mohamed Abdallah Goc =

South Sudanese politician and diplomat

Minister of Foreign Affairs and International Cooperation
- In office April 26, 2024 – April 10, 2025
- President: Salva Kiir
- Preceded by: James Pitia Morgan
- Succeeded by: Simaya Kumba

Personal details
- Born: South Sudan
- Occupation: Politician, diplomat

Ramadan Mohamed Abdallah Goc is a South Sudanese politician and diplomat who served as the Minister of Foreign Affairs and International Cooperation from April 26, 2024, until April 10, 2025. Before his appointment as foreign minister, he held senior diplomatic roles within the ministry and represented South Sudan in regional and international engagements.

== Career ==
Prior to becoming foreign minister, Goc served as a senior diplomat and later as deputy minister in the Ministry of Foreign Affairs and International Cooperation. In these roles, he participated in regional peace forums and bilateral discussions and engaged with international partners, including the European Union on issues related to regional security and trade routes affecting South Sudan.

He also took part in diplomatic exchanges with foreign missions in Juba, including discussions with the Turkish Embassy concerning bilateral cooperation in education and humanitarian support.

== Minister of Foreign Affairs ==
Goc was appointed Minister of Foreign Affairs and International Cooperation by President Salva Kiir on April 26, 2024, as part of a cabinet reshuffle aimed at strengthening South Sudan's diplomatic leadership.

During his tenure, he oversaw South Sudan's foreign relations during a period marked by regional instability and ongoing peace efforts. In September 2024, he addressed the United Nations General Assembly at its 79th session, reaffirming South Sudan's commitment to peace, political stability and regional cooperation.

He held discussions with senior United Nations officials on peacebuilding, displacement and humanitarian coordination affecting South Sudan and the wider region.

Under his leadership, South Sudan also engaged with international organisations on development and health diplomacy, including cooperation with the World Health Organization.

== Dismissal ==
On April 10, 2025, President Salva Kiir dismissed Goc from his position and appointed his deputy, Simaya Kumba, as Minister of Foreign Affairs and International Cooperation. According to Reuters, the dismissal followed diplomatic tensions involving South Sudan's relations with the United States.

== See also ==
- Government of South Sudan
- Ministry of Foreign Affairs and International Cooperation (South Sudan)
- Foreign relations of South Sudan
- Salva Kiir
