= Gazije, Bosnia and Herzegovina =

Gazije Газије
- Village
- Location within Bosnia and Herzegovina
- Coordinates: 43°50′06″N 18°51′18″E
- Country: Bosnia and Herzegovina
- Entity: Republika Srpska
- Municipality: Rogatica
- Time zone: UTC+1 (CET)
  - Summer (DST): UTC+2 (CEST)

Gazije (Serbian Cyrillic: Газије) is a village in the Republika Srpska, Bosnia and Herzegovina. According to the 1991 census, the village is located in the municipality of Rogatica.
