= Maris Sangiampongsa =

Thai politician

- มาริษ เสงี่ยมพงษ์
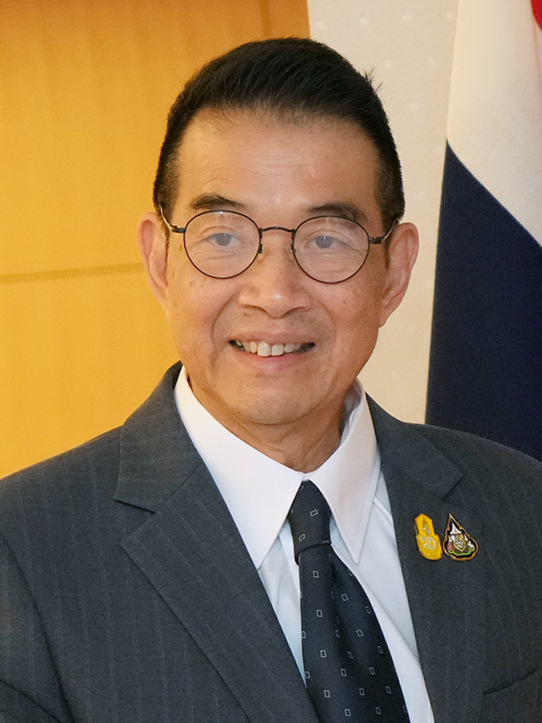
- Maris in 2024

Minister of Foreign Affairs
- In office 1 May 2024 – 19 September 2025
- Prime Minister: Srettha Thavisin; Paetongtarn Shinawatra
- Preceded by: Parnpree Bahiddha-nukara
- Succeeded by: Sihasak Phuangketkeow

Personal details
- Born: 19 November 1958 (age 67) Bangkok, Thailand
- Party: Pheu Thai (since 2024)
- Spouse: Korkan Sangiampongsa
- Education: Ramkhamhaeng University (BA); Ohio University (MA)
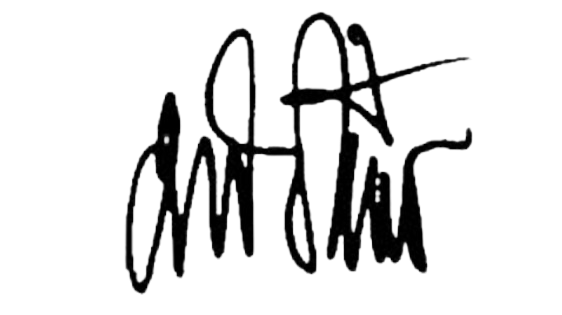
- Signature

Maris Sangiampongsa (Thai: มาริษ เสงี่ยมพงษ์, RTGS: Marit Sa-ngiamphong) is a Thai career diplomat who has served as Minister of Foreign Affairs from 30 April 2024 under Srettha Thavisin's cabinet and under Paetongtarn Shinawatra's cabinet from 1 May 2024 to 19 September 2025.

== Education ==
Maris graduated with a bachelor's degree in Political and Government from the Faculty of Political Science, Ramkhamhaeng University and a master's degree in International Relations from Ohio University, USA.

== Career ==
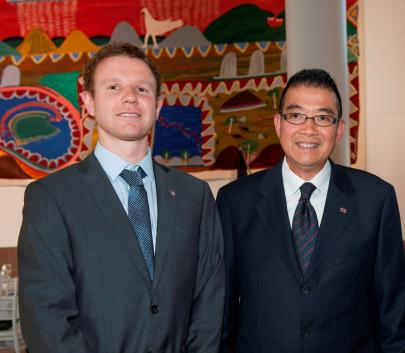
Maris as Thai Ambassador to Australia in 2014

Maris' first diplomatic assignment was in Brussels, Belgium and followed by Vientiane, Laos, Berlin, Germany, and Paris, France before receiving the position of ambassador to Nepal, Australia, New Zealand and Canada. He also has experience working in Ministry of Foreign Affairs as Department of International Organizations, Department of Information, and Department of International Economic Affairs.

== Political career ==
Maris was formerly an advisor to the Minister of Foreign Affairs Parnpree Bahiddha-nukara.

On April 30, 2024, there was a cabinet reshuffle Prime Minister Srettha Thavisin appointing Maris to the position of Minister of Foreign Affairs, replacing Parnpree who had resigned two days earlier.

== Honours ==
Maris has received the following royal decorations in the Honours System of Thailand:

- 2015 – Knight Grand Cordon (Special Class) of the Most Exalted Order of the White Elephant
- 2010 – Knight Grand Cordon (Special Class) of The Most Noble Order of the Crown of Thailand

=== Medals ===
- 2011 – Chakrabarti Mala Medal
