= James Pitia Morgan =

Sudanese politician

Minister of Foreign Affairs and International Cooperation of South Sudan
- Incumbent
- Assumed office April 29, 2026
- President: Salva Kiir
- Preceded by: Monday Semaya Kumba
- In office 31 August 2023 – 25 April 2024
- Preceded by: Deng Dau Deng (acting)
- Succeeded by: Ramadan Mohamed Abdallah Goc

James Pitia Morgan is a South Sudanese politician and diplomat who served as the Minister of Foreign Affairs and International Cooperation of South Sudan from 31 August 2023 until 25 April 2024, when he was appointed by President Salva Kiir as envoy to the African Great Lakes countries. He previously served as Ambassador to Ethiopia and Permanent Representative to the African Union. On April 29, 2026 he was appointed as the foreign minister, replacing Monday Semaya Kumba.
