= Foreign relations of Angola =

The foreign relations of Angola are based on Angola's strong support of U.S. foreign policy as the Angolan economy is dependent on U.S. foreign aid. From 1975 to 1989, Angola was aligned with the Eastern bloc, in particular the Soviet Union, Libya, and Cuba. Since then, it has focused on improving relationships with Western countries, cultivating links with other Portuguese-speaking countries, and asserting its own national interests in Central Africa through military and diplomatic intervention. In 1993, it established formal diplomatic relations with the United States. It has entered the Southern African Development Community as a vehicle for improving ties with its largely Anglophone neighbors to the south. Zimbabwe and Namibia joined Angola in its military intervention in the Democratic Republic of the Congo, where Angolan troops remain in support of the Joseph Kabila government. It also has intervened in the Republic of the Congo (Brazzaville) in support of Denis Sassou-Nguesso in the civil war.

Since 1998, Angola has successfully worked with the United Nations Security Council to impose and carry out sanctions on UNITA. More recently, it has extended those efforts to controls on conflict diamonds, the primary source of revenue for UNITA during the Civil War that ended in 2002. At the same time, Angola has promoted the revival of the Community of Portuguese Language Countries (CPLP) as a forum for cultural exchange and expanding ties with Portugal (its former ruler) and Brazil (which shares many cultural affinities with Angola) in particular. Angola is a member of the Port Management Association of Eastern and Southern Africa (PMAESA).

== Diplomatic relations ==
List of countries which Angola maintains diplomatic relations with:

#	Country	Date
1	Czech Republic	11 November 1975
2	Guinea	11 November 1975
3	Brazil	12 November 1975
4	Serbia	12 November 1975
5	Vietnam	12 November 1975
6	Cuba	15 November 1975
7	North Korea	16 November 1975
8	Bulgaria	20 November 1975
9	Poland	21 November 1975
10	Cambodia	4 December 1975
11	Romania	19 December 1975
12	Mongolia	10 February 1976
13	France	17 February 1976
14	Egypt	18 February 1976
15	Netherlands	18 February 1976
16	Mexico	20 February 1976
17	Portugal	9 March 1976
18	Nigeria	15 March 1976
19	Libya	30 March 1976
20	Italy	4 June 1976
21	Republic of the Congo	25 July 1976
22	Sweden	1 September 1976
23	Japan	9 September 1976
24	Denmark	16 September 1976
25	Finland	18 September 1976
26	Switzerland	30 September 1976
27	Ghana	8 October 1976
28	Russia	8 October 1976
29	Benin	11 October 1976
30	Hungary	8 April 1977
31	Ethiopia	13 July 1977
32	Guyana	24 July 1977
33	Bangladesh	August 1977
34	United Kingdom	14 October 1977
35	Algeria	19 October 1977
36	Spain	19 October 1977
37	Pakistan	20 October 1977
38	Austria	25 October 1977
39	Cape Verde	30 October 1977
40	Norway	31 October 1977
41	Yemen	2 November 1977
42	Belgium	16 December 1977
43	Canada	1 February 1978
44	São Tomé and Príncipe	19 February 1978
45	Mozambique	5 September 1978
46	Democratic Republic of the Congo	17 October 1978
47	Central African Republic	22 January 1979
48	Argentina	2 June 1979
49	India	2 June 1979
50	Germany	16 August 1979
51	Cameroon	21 August 1979
52	Zambia	19 October 1979
53	Tunisia	28 February 1980
54	Botswana	7 March 1980
55	Turkey	9 July 1980
56	Laos	11 July 1980
57	Niger	28 August 1980
58	Greece	30 August 1980
—	Sahrawi Arab Democratic Republic	August 1980
59	Tanzania	25 August 1981
60	Senegal	16 February 1982
61	Gabon	24 May 1982
62	Zimbabwe	15 October 1982
63	Equatorial Guinea	1982
64	China	12 January 1983
65	Grenada	13 March 1983
66	Ivory Coast	3 June 1983
67	Lesotho	1983
68	Morocco	24 June 1985
69	Kenya	22 July 1985
70	Suriname	6 September 1985
71	Iran	8 January 1986
72	Vanuatu	16 July 1986
73	Seychelles	7 November 1986
74	Venezuela	9 December 1986
75	Uruguay	6 March 1987
76	Mauritania	2 December 1987
77	Australia	30 March 1988
78	Colombia	29 April 1988
79	Albania	17 August 1988
80	Peru	27 August 1988
81	Togo	27 September 1988
82	Nicaragua	20 October 1988
83	Iceland	2 November 1988
84	Rwanda	20 December 1988
85	Burundi	21 December 1988
86	Panama	16 February 1989
87	Eswatini	8 November 1989
88	Namibia	11 April 1990
89	Chile	8 August 1990
90	South Korea	6 January 1992
—	State of Palestine	28 February 1992
91	Israel	16 April 1992
92	Thailand	24 August 1992
93	United States	19 May 1993
94	Slovakia	30 September 1993
95	Malawi	9 November 1993
96	North Macedonia	10 November 1993
97	South Africa	27 May 1994
98	Moldova	30 September 1994
99	Ukraine	30 September 1994
100	Armenia	3 October 1994
101	Kazakhstan	3 October 1994
102	Croatia	16 November 1994
103	Azerbaijan	1 December 1994
104	Belarus	24 April 1995
105	Qatar	1995
106	Lebanon	3 July 1996
107	Bolivia	29 January 1997
108	Estonia	10 March 1997
109	Georgia	10 March 1997
110	Ecuador	17 June 1997
111	Turkmenistan	18 June 1997
—	Holy See	8 July 1997
112	Kuwait	20 November 1997
113	United Arab Emirates	11 December 1997
114	Syria	10 February 1999
115	Bosnia and Herzegovina	24 September 1999
116	Cyprus	1 June 2000
117	Singapore	14 September 2000
118	Belize	24 January 2001
119	Ireland	24 January 2001
120	Costa Rica	13 March 2001
121	Malaysia	June 2001
122	Uganda	June 2001
123	Indonesia	7 August 2001
124	Philippines	14 September 2001
125	Luxembourg	14 May 2002
126	Timor-Leste	20 May 2002
127	Uzbekistan	29 May 2002
128	Lithuania	4 June 2002
129	Jamaica	8 October 2002
130	Mali	28 October 2002
131	Burkina Faso	17 January 2003
132	Mauritius	3 March 2003
133	Sudan	22 October 2003
134	Slovenia	20 January 2004
135	Sri Lanka	23 February 2004
136	Jordan	15 July 2004
137	Sierra Leone	1 November 2004
138	Comoros	22 December 2004
139	Chad	23 June 2005
140	Oman	13 December 2005
—	Sovereign Military Order of Malta	13 December 2005
141	Brunei	18 October 2006
142	Guinea-Bissau	8 January 2007
143	Paraguay	21 June 2007
144	Andorra	20 March 2009
145	Saudi Arabia	24 March 2009
146	San Marino	30 March 2009
147	Dominican Republic	25 September 2009
148	Liberia	3 December 2009
149	Montenegro	18 December 2009
150	Malta	15 June 2010
151	Fiji	18 May 2011
152	Latvia	7 July 2011
153	Eritrea	11 March 2012
154	Myanmar	19 September 2013
155	Bahrain	26 September 2013
156	New Zealand	4 October 2013
157	Iraq	21 February 2014
158	Monaco	31 July 2014
159	South Sudan	10 June 2016
160	Nepal	9 December 2017
161	Tajikistan	5 October 2020
162	Maldives	10 November 2020
163	Liechtenstein	23 June 2021
164	Somalia	31 August 2021
165	Gambia	3 September 2021
166	Djibouti	24 January 2022
167	Saint Vincent and the Grenadines	30 March 2022
168	Barbados	17 August 2022
169	Trinidad and Tobago	7 December 2022
170	El Salvador	18 September 2023
171	Guatemala	22 September 2023
172	Madagascar	8 July 2024
173	Kyrgyzstan	26 September 2024
174	Bahamas	26 September 2025

== Bilateral relations ==
=== Africa ===
Country	Formal Relations Began	Notes
Cape Verde	30 October 1977	See Angola–Cape Verde relations Cape Verde signed a friendship accord with Angola in December 1975, shortly after Angola gained its independence. Cape Verde and Guinea-Bissau served as stop-over points for Cuban troops on their way to Angola to fight UNITA rebels and South African troops. Prime Minister Pedro Pires sent FARP soldiers to Angola where they served as the personal bodyguards of Angolan President José Eduardo dos Santos.: Angola has an embassy in Praia.; Cape Verde has an embassy in Luanda and a consulate in Benguela.
Democratic Republic of Congo	17 October 1978	Many thousands of Angolans fled the country after the civil war. More than 20,000 people were forced to leave the Democratic Republic of the Congo in 2009, an action the DR Congo said was in retaliation for regular expulsion of Congolese diamond miners who were in Angola illegally. Angola sent a delegation to DR Congo's capital Kinshasa and succeeded in stopping government-forced expulsions which had become a "tit-for-tat" immigration dispute. "Congo and Angola have agreed to suspend expulsions from both sides of the border," said Lambert Mende, DR Congo information minister, in October 2009. "We never challenged the expulsions themselves; we challenged the way they were being conducted – all the beating of people and looting their goods, even sometimes their clothes," Mende said.: Angola has an embassy in Kinshasa.; DR Congo has an embassy in Luanda.
Kenya		See Angola–Kenya relations: Angola has an embassy in Nairobi.; Kenya has an embassy in Luanda.
Mozambique	5 July 1975	See Angola–Mozambique relations: Angola has an embassy in Maputo.; Mozambique has an embassy in Luanda.
Namibia	18 September 1990	See Angola–Namibia relations Namibia borders Angola to the south. In 1999, Namibia signed a mutual defense pact with its northern neighbor Angola. This affected the Angolan Civil War that had been ongoing since Angola's independence in 1975. Namibia's ruling party SWAPO sought to support the ruling party MPLA in Angola against the rebel movement UNITA, whose stronghold is in southern Angola, bordering to Namibia. The defence pact allowed Angolan troops to use Namibian territory when attacking Jonas Savimbi's UNITA.: Angola has an embassy in Windhoek and consulates-general in Oshakati and Rundu.; Namibia has an embassy in Luanda and consulates-general in Menongue and Ondjiva.
Nigeria	15 March 1976	See Angola–Nigeria relations Angolan-Nigerian relations are primarily based on their roles as oil exporting nations. Both are members of the Organization of the Petroleum Exporting Countries, the African Union and other multilateral organizations.: Angola has an embassy in Abuja.; Nigeria has an embassy in Luanda.
South Africa	17 May 1994	See Angola–South Africa relations Angola-South Africa relations are quite strong as the ruling parties in both nations, the African National Congress in South Africa and the MPLA in Angola, fought together during the Angolan Civil War and South African Border War. They fought against UNITA rebels, based in Angola, and the apartheid-era government in South Africa who supported them. Nelson Mandela mediated between the MPLA and UNITA factions during the last years of Angola's civil war.: Angola has an embassy in Pretoria and consulates-general in Cape Town and Johannesburg.; South Africa has an embassy in Luanda.
Zimbabwe	15 October 1982	See Angola–Zimbabwe relations

=== Americas ===
Country	Formal Relations Began	Notes
Argentina	2 Jun 1979	Both countries established diplomatic relations on 2 June 1979 See Angola–Argentina relations: Angola has an embassy in Buenos Aires.; Argentina has an embassy in Luanda.
Brazil	12 Nov 1975	See Angola–Brazil relations Commercial and economic ties dominate the relations of each country. Parts of both countries were part of the Portuguese Empire from the early 16th century until Brazil's independence in 1822. As of November 2007, "trade between the two countries is booming as never before": Angola has an embassy in Brasília and consulates-general in Rio de Janeiro and São Paulo.; Brazil has an embassy in Luanda.
Canada	1 Feb 1978	Both countries established diplomatic relations on 1 February 1978 Canada-Angola relations were established in 1978, and Canada is accredited to Angola from its embassy in Harare, Zimbabwe. Ties have grown since the end of the civil war in 2002, with increased engagement in areas of mutual interest. As Chair of the United Nations Security Council's Angola Sanctions Committee, Canada limited the ability of UNITA to continue its military campaign, sanctions helped to bring a ceasefire agreement to end Angola's conflict.: Angola is accredited to Canada from its embassy in Washington, D.C., United States.; Canada is accredited to Angola from its embassy in Harare, Zimbabwe and maintains an honorary consulate in Luanda.
Cuba	15 Nov 1975	See Angola–Cuba relations During Angola's civil war Cuban forces fought to install a Marxist–Leninist MPLA-PT government, against Western-backed UNITA and FLNA guerrillas and the South African army.: Angola has an embassy in Havana.; Cuba has an embassy in Luanda.
Mexico	20 Feb 1976	Both countries established diplomatic relations on 20 February 1976 See Angola–Mexico relations: Angola is accredited to Mexico from its embassy in Washington, D.C., United States.; Mexico is accredited to Angola from its embassy in Pretoria, South Africa and maintains an honorary consulate in Luanda.
United States	14 July 1994	Both countries established diplomatic relations on 14 July 1994 See Angola–United States relations Embassy of Angola in Washington, D.C. From the mid-1980s through at least 1992, the United States was the primary source of military and other support for the UNITA rebel movement, which was led from its creation through 2002 by Jonas Savimbi. The U.S. refused to recognize Angola diplomatically during this period. Relations between the United States of America and the Republic of Angola (formerly the People's Republic of Angola) have warmed since Angola's ideological renunciation of Communism before the 1992 elections.: Angola has an embassy in Washington, D.C., and consulates-general in Houston and New York City.; United States has an embassy in Luanda.
Uruguay	6 March 1987	Both countries established diplomatic relations on 6 March 1987 See Angola–Uruguay relations: Angola has a consulate-general in Montevideo.; Uruguay is accredited to Angola from its embassy in Pretoria, South Africa.

=== Asia ===
Country	Formal Relations Began	Notes
China	12 January 1983	Both countries established diplomatic relations on 12 January 1983 See Angola–China relations Chinese prime minister Wen Jiabao visited Angola in June 2006, offering a US$9 billion loan for infrastructure improvements in return for petroleum. The PRC has invested heavily in Angola since the end of the civil war in 2002. João Manuel Bernardo, the current ambassador of Angola to China, visited the PRC in November 2007.: Angola has an embassy in Beijing and a consulate-general in Macau.; China has an embassy in Luanda.
India	2 June 1979	Both countries established diplomatic relations on 2 June 1979 See Angola–India relations: Angola has an embassy in New Delhi.; India has an embassy in Luanda.
Israel	16 April 1992	See Angola–Israel relations Angola-Israel relations, primarily based on trade and pro-United States foreign policies, are excellent. In March 2006, the trade volume between the two countries amounted to $400 million. In 2005, President José Eduardo dos Santos visited Israel.: Angola/Israel business volume amounted at USD 400 million Angola Press, 22 March 2006; Israeli Ambassador Highlights Relations With Angola Angola Press; Angola has an embassy in Tel Aviv.; Israel has an embassy in Luanda.
Japan	September 1976	See Angola–Japan relations Diplomatic relations between Japan and Angola were established in September 1976. Japan has donated towards demining following the civil war.: Angola has an embassy in Tokyo.; Japan has an embassy in Luanda.
Pakistan	20 October 1977	Both countries established diplomatic relations on 20 October 1977 The Government of Angola called for the support of Pakistan for the candidature of Angola to the seat of non-permanent member of the UN Security Council, whose election is set for September this year, during the 69th session of the General Assembly of United Nations. On the fringes of the ceremony, the Angolan diplomat also met with officials in charge of the economic and commercial policy of Pakistan, to assess the business opportunities between the two states. It asked to discuss aspects related to the cooperation on several domains of common interest.
Philippines	14 September 2001	Both countries established diplomatic relations on 14 September 2001.: Angola has an embassy in Manila.; Philippines is accredited to Angola from its embassy in Lisbon, Portugal.
Turkey	9 July 1980	Both countries established diplomatic relations on 9 July 1980 See Angola–Turkey relations: Angola has an embassy in Ankara.; Turkey has an embassy in Luanda.; Trade volume between the two countries was US$212 million in 2019.
Vietnam	12 November 1975	Both countries established diplomatic relations on 12 November 1975 See Angola–Vietnam relations Angola-Vietnam relations were established on 12 November 1975 after Angola gained its independence, when future president of Angola Agostinho Neto visited Vietnam. Angola and Vietnam have steadfast partners as both transitioned from Cold War-era foreign policies of international communism to pro-Western pragmatism following the fall of the Soviet Union.: Angola has an embassy in Hanoi.; Vietnam has an embassy in Luanda.

=== Europe ===
Country	Formal Relations Began	Notes
France	17 February 1976	See Angola–France relations Relations between the two countries have not always been cordial due to the former French government's policy of supporting militant separatists in Angola's Cabinda province and the international Angolagate scandal embarrassed both governments by exposing corruption and illicit arms deals. Following French president Nicolas Sarkozy's visit in 2008, relations have improved.: Angola has an embassy in Paris.; France has an embassy in Luanda.
Germany	16 August 1979	Both countries established diplomatic relations on 16 August 1979 See Angola–Germany relations: Angola has an embassy in Berlin.; Germany has an embassy in Luanda.
Holy See	14 April 1975	Angola has an embassy to the Holy See based in Rome.; Holy See has an Apostolic Nuncio to Angola.
Italy	4 June 1976	See Angola–Italy relations: Angola has an embassy in Rome.; Italy has an embassy in Luanda.
Netherlands	18 February 1976	Angola has an embassy in The Hague and a consulate-general in Rotterdam.; Netherlands has an embassy in Luanda.
Portugal	9 March 1976	See Angola–Portugal relations Angola-Portugal relations have significantly improved since the Angolan government abandoned communism and nominally embraced democracy in 1991, embracing a pro-U.S. and to a lesser degree pro-Europe foreign policy. Portugal ruled Angola for 400 years, colonizing the territory from 1483 until independence in 1975. Angola's war for independence did not end in a military victory for either side, but was suspended as a result of a coup in Portugal that replaced the Caetano regime.: Angola has an embassy in Lisbon and a consulate-general in Porto.; Portugal has an embassy in Luanda and a consulate-general in Benguela.
Russia	11 November 1975	Both countries established diplomatic relations on 11 November 1975 See Angola–Russia relations: Angola has an embassy in Moscow.; Russia has an embassy in Luanda.
Serbia	12 November 1975	Both countries established diplomatic relations on 12 November 1975 See Angola–Serbia relations The defence minister of Serbia, Dragan Šutanovac, stated in a 2011 meeting in Luanda that Serbia would negotiate with the Angolan military authorities for the construction of a new military hospital in Angola. Angola supports Serbia's stance on Kosovo, and recognizes Serbia's territorial integrity.: Angola has an embassy in Belgrade.; Serbia has an embassy in Luanda.
Spain	19 October 1977	Both countries established diplomatic relations on 19 October 1977 See Angola–Spain relations: Angola has an embassy in Madrid.; Spain has an embassy in Luanda.
United Kingdom	14 October 1977	See Angola–United Kingdom relations British Foreign Secretary William Hague with Foreign Minister Georges Rebelo Chikoti and Foreign Office Minister Henry Bellingham in London, February 2012. Angola established diplomatic relations with the United Kingdom on 14 October 1977.: Angola maintains an embassy in London.; The United Kingdom is accredited to Angola through its embassy in Luanda.; Both countries share common membership of the Atlantic Co-operation Pact, the World Health Organization, and the World Trade Organization. Bilaterally the two countries have a High Level Prosperity Partnership.

=== See also ===
- List of diplomatic missions in Angola
- List of diplomatic missions of Angola
- Visa requirements for Angolan citizens
