= Angola–Japan relations =

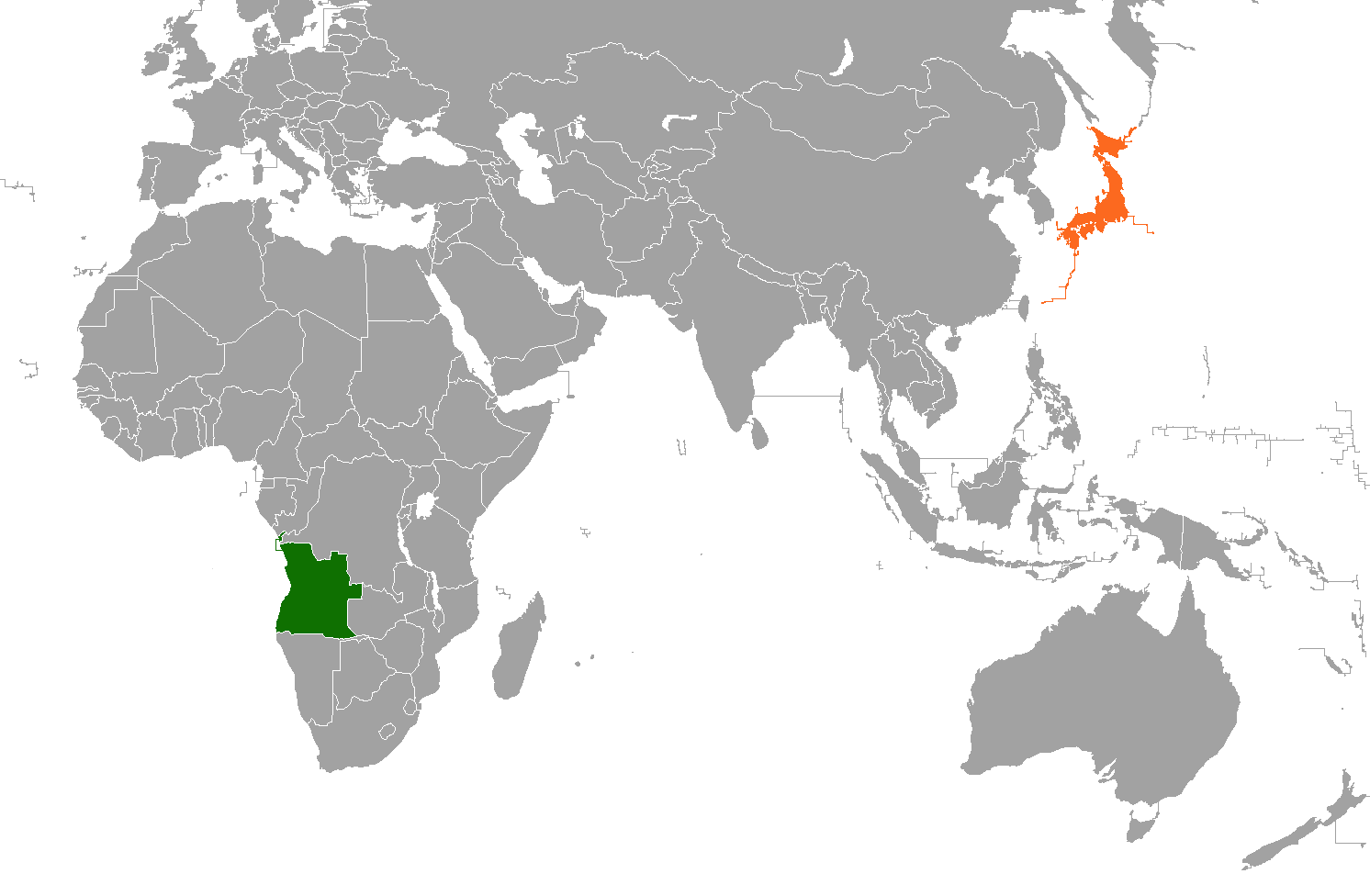
- Angola: Japan

Relations between Angola and Japan were established in September 1976, shortly after Angola received formal sovereignty. The Portuguese maritime empire linked its colonial footholds in Portuguese Angola directly to Nagasaki which carried African crews, servants, and enslaved people transported across the Portuguese trade routes to Feudal Japan. As of 2007, economic relations played "a fundamental role in the bilateral relations between the two governments." Japan has an embassy in Luanda. Angola has an embassy in Tokyo.

== History ==
The historical comparisons between Angola and Feudal Japan during the late 16th and early 17th centuries which serve as an excellent case in how the Portuguese Empire adapted its global strategy. While the Portuguese interacted with both regions simultaneously during Japan's chaotic Sengoku period and the expansion of the Portuguese West African slave trade, the outcomes were drastically different due to the varying military and political capabilities of the local rulers. The Society of Jesus (Jesuits) were the vanguard of Portuguese influence in both lands. In the Kingdom of Kongo, early kings had converted willingly to Catholicism, turning the region into a close diplomatic ally of Lisbon. Angola and Japan established relations in September 1976.

== High level visits ==
UNICEF Amity Ambassador Tetsuko Kuroyanagi visited Angola in 1989. Masakuni Murakami, a member of the House of Councillors, visited in 1994. Tetsuro Yano, a member of the House of Councillors, visited Angola in 1998. Tetsuro Yano, a member of the House of Councillors, visited in 2000. Tetsuro Yano, a member of the House of Councillors, visited in 2001. Foreign Affairs Minister Yoriko Kawaguchi visited in 2001. Tetsuro Yano, a member of the House of Councillors, in 2002. Tetsuro Yano, Senior Vice-Minister for Foreign Affairs, visited in 2003. Tetsuro Yano, a member of the House of Councillors, in 2004. Pedro de Castro van Dúnem, the Minister of External Relations, visited Japan in 1989, 1991 and 1992. Minister of Commerce and Tourism Dias visited in 1993. In 1995, Prime Minister Marcolino Moco, Minister of Foreign Affairs Venâncio da Silva Moura, Minister of Oil Albina F. de Assis, Secretary of Cabinet of Ministers Feijo, Minister of Geology and Mines Dias, and Minister of Fisheries and Environment Marta de F. M. Jardim all visited Japan in 1995. Antonio D.P. Costa Neto, the Minister of Public Administration Employment and Social Security, visited in 1998. Secretary of the Cabinet of Ministers Van-Dunem visited in 1999. Angolan President José Eduardo dos Santos, Minister of Hotels and Tourism Valentin, and Minister of Foreign Affairs Miranda visited in 2001. Minister of Commerce Hossi visited in 2002. Minister of Finance Moras and Assistant Minister to the Prime Minister Jaime visited in 2003.

== Education ==
Japan became the first country in Asia to have an educational partnership with a school in Angola on 21 January 2013, when Japan's Ryukoku University (Kyoto City) and Angola's Agostinho Neto University engaged in a student exchange and academic research cooperative agreement. The cooperative agreement was signed at the Angolan Embassy in Japan by Ryukoku's Dean Akamatsu, Agostinho Neto University's Dean, and the Angolan Ambassador to Japan.

== See also ==
- Foreign relations of Angola
- Foreign relations of Japan
