= Angola–Mexico relations =

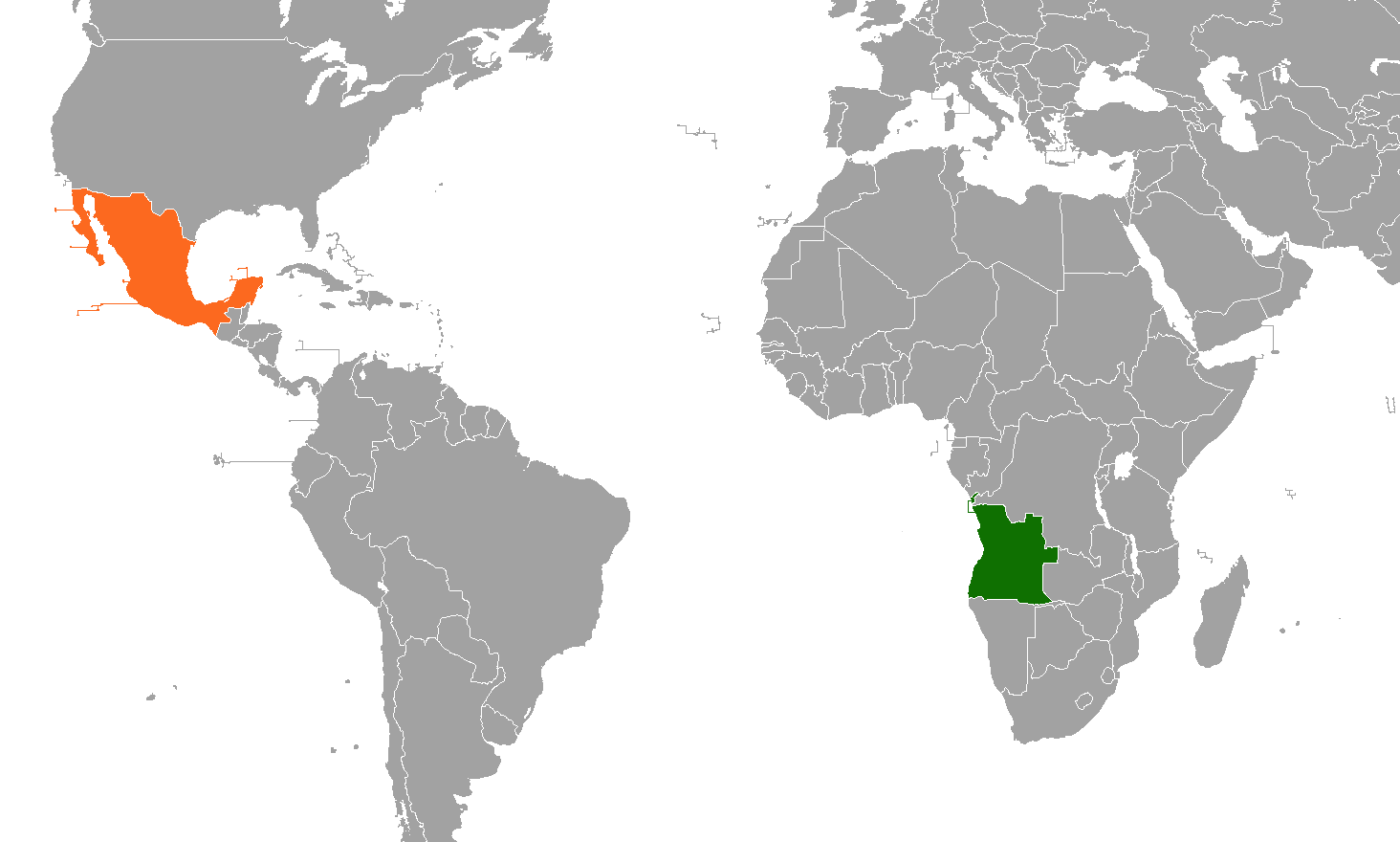

- Angola: Mexico

The nations of Angola and Mexico established diplomatic relations in 1976. Both nations are members of the United Nations.

== History ==
During the Atlantic slave trade, Portugal and Spain transported enslaved people from Angola to Mexico where they arrived primarily to the port city of Veracruz. Angola gained its independence from Portugal in November 1975. On 20 February 1976, Mexico recognized the independence and established diplomatic relations with Angola.

Soon after gaining independence, Angola entered into a civil war which lasted until 2002. During the war, Mexico vehemently opposed the presence of South African troops in Angola. In 1985, Mexican Foreign Minister Bernardo Sepúlveda Amor paid a visit to Angola, becoming the first high level government official to do so. In 1989, Mexican Foreign Secretary Fernando Solana also paid a visit to the country.

In 1997, towards the end of the Angolan civil war, Angola opened an embassy in Mexico City. In March 2006, Angolan Prime Minister Fernando da Piedade Dias dos Santos paid a visit to Mexico where he met with President Vicente Fox.

In 2009, Mexico opened an embassy in Luanda, however, due to the global economic crisis to which Mexico was not immune, the embassy in Angola closed only after a few months. In 2014, Mexican Foreign Secretary José Antonio Meade paid a visit to Angola. During the visit, Foreign Secretary Meade promised that Mexico would re-open an embassy in Angola, however, the embassy never reopened. In November 2018, Angola closed its embassy in Mexico City due to budgetary restrictions. In December 2018, Angolan Foreign Minister Manuel Domingos Augusto attended the inauguration for Mexican President Andrés Manuel López Obrador.

In 2019, several hundred African migrants entered Mexico en route to the Mexico–United States border. Many of the migrants originated from Angola and were attempting to seek asylum in the United States and escape poverty and human rights abuses in Angola.

In 2024, both nations celebrated 48 years of diplomatic relations.

== High-level visits ==
High-level visits from Angola to Mexico

- Prime Minister Fernando da Piedade Dias dos Santos (2006)
- Minister of Health Sebastiao Sapuile Veloso (2006)
- Foreign Vice-Minister Georges Rebelo Chicoti (2006)
- Minister of the Economy Abrahão Pio dos Santos Gourgel (2013)
- Foreign Minister Manuel Domingos Augusto (2018)

High-level visits from Mexico to Angola

- Foreign Secretary Bernardo Sepúlveda Amor (1985)
- Foreign Secretary Fernando Solana (1989)
- Foreign Secretary José Antonio Meade (2014)
- Foreign Undersecretary Carlos de Icaza (2014)
- Director General for Africa and the Middle East María Carmen Oñate Muñoz (2014)
- Director General of ProMéxico Francisco González Díaz (2014)

== Bilateral agreements ==
Both nations have signed the following bilateral agreements: Memorandum of Understanding for the establishment of a consultation mechanism on materials of mutual interest (2004); Agreement on Educational, Cultural and Technical Cooperation (2014) and a Memorandum of Understanding of Diplomatic and Academic Cooperation (2014).

== Trade relations ==
In 2023, trade between Angola and Mexico totaled US$21.2 million. Angola's main exports to Mexico was petroleum gas. Mexico's main exports to Angola include: iron or steel pipes and tubes. Mexican multinational companies such as Grupo Gusi and Sukarne operate in Angola. In 2022, Mexican cement company Cemex teamed with Danish construction-technology company COBOD to foment 3D concrete printing of houses in Angola.

== Diplomatic missions ==
- Angola is accredited to Mexico from its embassy in Washington, D.C., United States.
- Mexico is accredited to Angola from its embassy in Pretoria, South Africa and maintains an honorary consulate in Luanda.
