= List of foreign ministers in 2008 =

This is a list of foreign ministers in 2008.

== Africa ==
- Algeria – Mourad Medelci (2007–2013)
- Angola –
  1. João Bernardo de Miranda (1999–2008)
  2. Assunção dos Anjos (2008–2010)
- Benin –
  1. Moussa Okanla (2007–2008)
  2. Jean-Marie Ehouzou (2008–2011)
- Botswana –
  1. Mompati Merafhe (1994–2008)
  2. Phandu Skelemani (2008–2014)
- Burkina Faso –
  1. Djibril Bassolé (2007–2008)
  2. Alain Bédouma Yoda (2008–2011)
- Burundi – Antoinette Batumubwira (2005–2009)
- Cameroon – Henri Eyebe Ayissi (2007–2011)
- Cape Verde –
  1. Víctor Borges (2004–2008)
  2. José Brito (2008–2011)
- Central African Republic –
  1. Côme Zoumara (2006–2008)
  2. Dieudonné Kombo Yaya (2008–2009)
- Chad –
  1. Ahmad Allam-Mi (2005–2008)
  2. Moussa Faki (2008–2017)
- Comoros – Ahmed Ben Said Jaffar (2006–2010)
- Republic of Congo – Basile Ikouébé (2007–2015)
- Democratic Republic of Congo –
  1. Antipas Mbusa Nyamwisi (2007–2008)
  2. Alexis Thambwe Mwamba (2008–2012)
- Côte d'Ivoire – Youssouf Bakayoko (2006–2010)
- Djibouti – Mahamoud Ali Youssouf (2005–present)
- Egypt – Ahmed Aboul Gheit (2004–2011)
- Equatorial Guinea – Pastor Micha Ondó Bile (2003–2012)
- Eritrea – Osman Saleh Mohammed (2007–present)
- Ethiopia – Seyoum Mesfin (1991–2010)
- Gabon –
  1. Jean Ping (1999–2008)
  2. Laure Olga Gondjout (2008)
  3. Paul Toungui (2008–2012)
- The Gambia –
  1. Crispin Grey-Johnson (2007–2008)
  2. Omar Touray (2008–2009)
- Ghana – Akwasi Osei-Adjei (2007–2009)
- Guinea –
  1. Kabèlè Abdoul Camara (2007–2008)
  2. Amadou Lamarana Bah (2008–2009)
- Guinea-Bissau – Maria da Conceição Nobre Cabral (2007–2009)
- Kenya –
  1. Raphael Tuju (2005–2008)
  2. Moses Wetangula (2008–2012)
- Lesotho – Mohlabi Tsekoa (2007–2015)
- Liberia – Olubanke King-Akerele (2007–2010)
- Libya – Abdel Rahman Shalgham (2000–2009)
- Madagascar – Marcel Ranjeva (2002–2009)
- Malawi – Joyce Banda (2006–2009)
- Mali – Moctar Ouane (2004–2011)
- Mauritania –
  1. Mohamed Saleck Ould Mohamed Lemine (2007–2008)
  2. Cheikh El Avia Ould Mohamed Khouna (2008)
  3. Abdallahi Hassen Ben Hmeida (2008)
  4. Mohamed Mahmoud Ould Mohamedou (2008–2009)
- Mauritius –
  1. Madan Dulloo (2005–2008)
  2. Navin Ramgoolam (acting) (2008)
  3. Arvin Boolell (2008–2014)
- Morocco – Taieb Fassi Fihri (2007–2012)
  - Western Sahara – Mohamed Salem Ould Salek (1998–present)
- Mozambique –
  1. Alcinda Abreu (2005–2008)
  2. Oldemiro Balói (2008–2017)
- Namibia – Marco Hausiku (2004–2010)
- Niger – Aïchatou Mindaoudou (2001–2010)
- Nigeria – Ojo Maduekwe (2007–2010)
- Rwanda –
  1. Charles Murigande (2002–2008)
  2. Rosemary Museminari (2008–2009)
- São Tomé and Príncipe –
  1. Ovídio Manuel Barbosa Pequeno (2007–2008)
  2. Carlos Tiny (2008–2010)
- Senegal – Cheikh Tidiane Gadio (2000–2009)
- Seychelles – Patrick Pillay (2005–2009)
- Sierra Leone – Zainab Bangura (2007–2010)
- Somalia –
  1. Muhammad Ali Hamoud (2007–2008)
  2. Ali Ahmed Jama Jangali (2008–2009)
  - Somaliland – Abdillahi Mohamed Duale (2006–2010)
  - Puntland – Ali Abdi Aware (2007–2008)
- South Africa – Nkosazana Dlamini-Zuma (1999–2009)
- Sudan – Deng Alor (2007–2010)
- Swaziland –
  1. Moses Mathendele Dlamini (2006–2008)
  2. Lutfo Dlamini (2008–2011)
- Tanzania – Bernard Membe (2007–2015)
- Togo –
  1. Léopold Gnininvi (2007–2008)
  2. Kofi Esaw (2008–2010)
- Tunisia – Abdelwahab Abdallah (2005–2010)
- Uganda – Sam Kutesa (2005–2021)
- Western Sahara – Mohamed Salem Ould Salek (1998–2023)
- Zambia – Kabinga Pande (2007–2011)
- Zimbabwe – Simbarashe Mumbengegwi (2005–2017)

== Asia ==
- Afghanistan – Rangin Dadfar Spanta (2006–2010)
- Armenia –
  1. Vartan Oskanian (1998–2008)
  2. Eduard Nalbandyan (2008–2018)
- Azerbaijan – Elmar Mammadyarov (2004–2020)
  - Nagorno-Karabakh – Georgy Petrosyan (2005–2011)
- Bahrain – Sheikh Khalid ibn Ahmad Al Khalifah (2005–2020)
- Bangladesh – Iftekhar Ahmed Chowdhury (2007–2009)
- Bhutan –
  1. Yeshey Dorji (acting) (2007–2008)
  2. Ugyen Tshering (2008–2013)
- Brunei – Pengiran Muda Mohamed Bolkiah (1984–2015)
- Cambodia – Hor Namhong (1998–2016)
- China – Yang Jiechi (2007–2013)
- East Timor – Zacarias da Costa (2007–2012)
- Georgia –
  1. Gela Bezhuashvili (2005–2008)
  2. Davit Bakradze (2008)
  3. Ekaterine Tkeshelashvili (2008)
  4. Grigol Vashadze (2008–2012)
  - Abkhazia – Sergei Shamba (2004–2010)
  - South Ossetia – Murat Dzhioyev (1998–2012)
- India – Pranab Mukherjee (2006–2009)
- Indonesia – Hassan Wirajuda (2001–2009)
- Iran – Manouchehr Mottaki (2005–2010)
- Iraq – Hoshyar Zebari (2003–2014)
  - Kurdistan – Falah Mustafa Bakir (2006–2019)
- Israel – Tzipi Livni (2006–2009)
  - Palestinian Authority – Riyad al-Maliki (2007–present)
- Japan –
  1. Masahiko Kōmura (2007–2008)
  2. Hirofumi Nakasone (2008–2009)
- Jordan – Salah Bashir (2007–2009)
- Kazakhstan – Marat Tazhin (2007–2009)
- North Korea – Pak Ui-chun (2007–2014)
- South Korea –
  1. Song Min-soon (2006–2008)
  2. Yu Myung-hwan (2008–2010)
- Kuwait – Sheikh Mohammad Sabah Al-Salem Al-Sabah (2003–2011)
- Kyrgyzstan – Ednan Karabayev (2007–2009)
- Laos – Thongloun Sisoulith (2006–2016)
- Lebanon –
  - Fawzi Salloukh (2005–2009)
  - Tarek Mitri (acting) (2006–2008)
- Malaysia –
  1. Syed Hamid Albar (1999–2008)
  2. Rais Yatim (2008–2009)
- Maldives –
  1. Abdullah Shahid (2007–2008)
  2. Ahmed Shaheed (2008–2011)
- Mongolia –
  1. Sanjaasürengiin Oyuun (2007–2008)
  2. Sükhbaataryn Batbold (2008–2009)
- Myanmar – Nyan Win (2004–2011)
- Nepal –
  1. Sahana Pradhan (2007–2008)
  2. Upendra Yadav (2008–2009)
- Oman – Yusuf bin Alawi bin Abdullah (1982–3030)
- Pakistan –
  1. Inam-ul-Haq (2007–2008)
  2. Shah Mehmood Qureshi (2008–2011)
- Philippines – Alberto Romulo (2004–2011)
- Qatar – Sheikh Hamad bin Jassim bin Jaber Al Thani (1992–2013)
- Saudi Arabia – Prince Saud bin Faisal bin Abdulaziz Al Saud (1975–2015)
- Singapore – George Yeo (2004–2011)
- Sri Lanka – Rohitha Bogollagama (2007–2010)
- Syria – Walid Muallem (2006–2020)
- Taiwan –
  1. James C. F. Huang (2006–2008)
  2. Francisco Ou (2008–2009)
- Tajikistan – Khamrokhon Zaripov (2006–2013)
- Thailand –
  1. Nitya Pibulsonggram (2006–2008)
  2. Noppadon Pattama (2008)
  3. Tej Bunnag (2008)
  4. Saroj Chavanavirat (2008)
  5. Sompong Amornwiwat (2008)
  6. Kasit Piromya (2008–2011)
- Turkmenistan – Raşit Meredow (2001–present)
- United Arab Emirates – Sheikh Abdullah bin Zayed Al Nahyan (2006–present)
- Uzbekistan – Vladimir Norov (2006–2010)
- Vietnam – Phạm Gia Khiêm (2006–2011)
- Yemen – Abu Bakr al-Qirbi (2001–2014)

== Europe ==
- Albania – Lulzim Basha (2007–2009)
- Andorra – Meritxell Mateu i Pi (2007–2009)
- Austria –
  1. Ursula Plassnik (2004–2008)
  2. Michael Spindelegger (2008–2013)
- Belarus – Sergei Martynov (2003–2012)
- Belgium – Karel De Gucht (2004–2009)
  - Brussels-Capital Region – Guy Vanhengel (2000–2009)
  - Flanders –
    1. Geert Bourgeois (2004–2008)
    2. Kris Peeters (2008–2014)
  - Wallonia – Marie-Dominique Simonet (2004–2009)
- Bosnia and Herzegovina – Sven Alkalaj (2007–2012)
- Bulgaria – Ivailo Kalfin (2005–2009)
- Croatia –
  1. Kolinda Grabar-Kitarović (2005–2008)
  2. Gordan Jandroković (2008–2011)
- Cyprus –
  1. Erato Kozakou-Marcoullis (2007–2008)
  2. Markos Kyprianou (2008–2011)
  - Northern Cyprus – Turgay Avcı (2006–2009)
- Czech Republic – Karel Schwarzenberg (2007–2009)
- Denmark – Per Stig Møller (2001–2010)
  - Greenland –
    1. Aleqa Hammond (2007–2008)
    2. Per Berthelsen (2008–2009)
  - Faroe Islands –
    1. Høgni Hoydal (2008)
    2. Jørgen Niclasen (2008–2011)
- Estonia – Urmas Paet (2005–2014)
- Finland –
  1. Ilkka Kanerva (2007–2008)
  2. Alexander Stubb (2008–2011)
- France – Bernard Kouchner (2007–2010)
- Germany – Frank-Walter Steinmeier (2005–2009)
- Greece – Dora Bakoyannis (2006–2009)
- Hungary – Kinga Göncz (2006–2009)
- Iceland – Ingibjörg Sólrún Gísladóttir (2007–2009)
- Ireland –
  1. Dermot Ahern (2004–2008)
  2. Micheál Martin (2008–2011)
- Italy –
  1. Massimo D'Alema (2006–2008)
  2. Franco Frattini (2008–2011)
- Latvia – Māris Riekstiņš (2007–2010)
- Liechtenstein – Rita Kieber-Beck (2005–2009)
- Lithuania –
  1. Petras Vaitiekūnas (2006–2008)
  2. Vygaudas Ušackas (2008–2010)
- Luxembourg – Jean Asselborn (2004–present)
- Republic of Macedonia – Antonio Milošoski (2006–2011)
- Malta –
  1. Michael Frendo (2004–2008)
  2. Tonio Borg (2008–2012)
- Moldova – Andrei Stratan (2004–2009)
  - Transnistria –
    1. Valeriy Litskai (2000–2008)
    2. Vladimir Yastrebchak (2008–2012)
- Monaco –
  1. Jean Pastorelli (2007–2008)
  2. Franck Biancheri (2008–2011)
- Montenegro – Milan Roćen (2006–2012)
- Netherlands – Maxime Verhagen (2007–2010)
- Norway – Jonas Gahr Støre (2005–2012)
- Poland – Radosław Sikorski (2007–2014)
- Portugal – Luís Amado (2006–2011)
- Romania –
  1. Adrian Cioroianu (2007–2008)
  2. Lazăr Comănescu (2008)
  3. Cristian Diaconescu (2008–2009)
- Russia – Sergey Lavrov (2004–present)
- San Marino –
  1. Fiorenzo Stolfi (2006–2008)
  2. Antonella Mularoni (2008–2012)
- Serbia – Vuk Jeremić (2007–2012)
  - Kosovo – Skënder Hyseni (2008–2010)
- Slovakia – Ján Kubiš (2006–2009)
- Slovenia –
  1. Dimitrij Rupel (2004–2008)
  2. Samuel Žbogar (2008–2012)
- Spain – Miguel Ángel Moratinos (2004–2010)
- Sweden – Carl Bildt (2006–2014)
- Switzerland – Micheline Calmy-Rey (2003–2011)
- Turkey – Ali Babacan (2007–2009)
- Ukraine – Volodymyr Ohryzko (2007–2009)
- United Kingdom – David Miliband (2007–2010)
  - Scotland – Linda Fabiani (2007–2009)
- Vatican City – Archbishop Dominique Mamberti (2006–2014)

== North America and the Caribbean ==
- Antigua and Barbuda – Baldwin Spencer (2005–2014)
- The Bahamas – Brent Symonette (2007–2012)
- Barbados –
  1. Dame Billie Miller (1994–2008)
  2. Christopher Sinckler (2008)
  3. Maxine McClean (2008–2018)
- Belize –
  1. Lisa Shoman (2007–2008)
  2. Wilfred Elrington (2008–2020)
- Canada –
  1. Maxime Bernier (2007–2008)
  2. David Emerson (2008)
  3. Lawrence Cannon (2008–2011)
  - Quebec –
    1. Monique Gagnon-Tremblay (2003–2008)
    2. Pierre Arcand (2008–2010)
- Costa Rica – Bruno Stagno Ugarte (2006–2010)
- Cuba – Felipe Pérez Roque (1999–2009)
- Dominica –
  1. Roosevelt Skerrit (2007–2008)
  2. Vince Henderson (2008–2010)
- Dominican Republic – Carlos Morales Troncoso (2004–2014)
- El Salvador –
  1. Francisco Laínez (2004–2008)
  2. Marisol Argueta de Barillas (2008–2009)
- Grenada –
  1. Elvin Nimrod (2000–2008)
  2. Peter David (2008–2010)
- Guatemala –
  1. Gert Rosenthal (2006–2008)
  2. Haroldo Rodas (2008–2012)
- Haiti –
  1. Jean Rénald Clérismé (2006–2008)
  2. Alrich Nicolas (2008–2009)
- Honduras –
  1. Milton Jiménez (2006–2008)
  2. Ángel Edmundo Orellana (2008–2009)
- Jamaica – Kenneth Baugh (2007–2012)
- Mexico – Patricia Espinosa (2006–2012)
- Netherlands Antilles – Emily de Jongh-Elhage (2006–2010)
- Nicaragua – Samuel Santos López (2007–2017)
- Panama – Samuel Lewis Navarro (2004–2009)
- Puerto Rico – Fernando Bonilla (2005–2009)
- Saint Kitts and Nevis –
  1. Timothy Harris (2001–2008)
  2. Denzil Douglas (2008–2010)
- Saint Lucia – Stephenson King (2007–2009)
- Saint Vincent and the Grenadines – Sir Louis Straker (2005–2010)
- Trinidad and Tobago – Paula Gopee-Scoon (2007–2010)
- United States – Condoleezza Rice (2005–2009)

== Oceania ==
- Australia – Stephen Smith (2007–2010)
- Fiji –
  1. Ratu Epeli Nailatikau (2007–2008)
  2. Frank Bainimarama (2008–2009)
- French Polynesia –
  1. Oscar Temaru (2007–2008)
  2. Gaston Flosse (2008)
  3. Gaston Tong Sang (2008–2009)
- Kiribati – Anote Tong (2003–2016)
- Marshall Islands –
  1. Gerald Zackios (2001–2008)
  2. Tony deBrum (2008–2009)
- Micronesia – Lorin S. Robert (2007–2019)
- Nauru – Kieren Keke (2007–2011)
- New Zealand –
  1. Winston Peters (2005–2008)
  2. Murray McCully (2008–2017)
  - Cook Islands – Wilkie Rasmussen (2005–2009)
  - Niue –
    1. Young Vivian (2002–2008)
    2. Toke Talagi (2008–2020)
  - Tokelau – Pio Tuia (2008–2009)
- Palau – Temmy Shmull (2001–2009)
- Papua New Guinea – Sam Abal (2007–2010)
- Samoa – Tuilaepa Aiono Sailele Malielegaoi (1998–2021)
- Solomon Islands – William Haomae (2007–2010)
- Tonga – Sonatane Tu'a Taumoepeau Tupou (2004–2009)
- Tuvalu – Apisai Ielemia (2006–2010)
- Vanuatu –
  1. George Wells (2007–2008)
  2. Pakoa Kaltonga (2008–2009)

== South America ==
- Argentina – Jorge Taiana (2005–2010)
- Bolivia – David Choquehuanca (2006–2017)
- Brazil – Celso Amorim (2003–2011)
- Chile – Alejandro Foxley (2006–2009)
- Colombia –
  1. Fernando Araújo Perdomo (2007–2008)
  2. Jaime Bermúdez (2008–2010)
- Ecuador –
  1. María Isabel Salvador (2007–2008)
  2. Fander Falconí (2008–2010)
- Guyana –
  1. Rudy Insanally (2001–2008)
  2. Carolyn Rodrigues (2008–2015)
- Paraguay –
  1. Rubén Ramírez Lezcano (2006–2008)
  2. Alejandro Hamed (2008–2009)
- Peru – José Antonio García Belaúnde (2006–2011)
- Suriname – Lygia Kraag-Keteldijk (2005–2010)
- Uruguay –
  1. Reinaldo Gargano (2005–2008)
  2. Gonzalo Fernández (2008–2009)
- Venezuela – Nicolás Maduro (2006–2013)
