= Paulo Teixeira Jorge =

Angolan politician

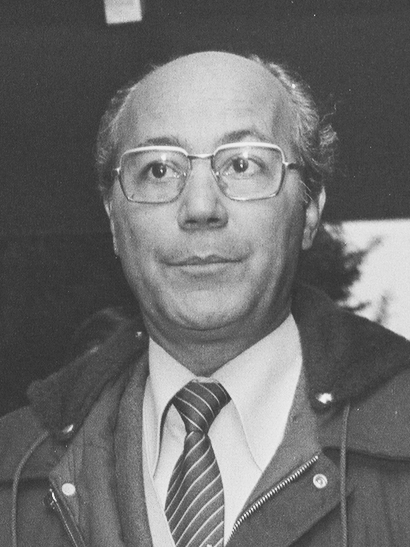
- Jorge in 1978

Governor of Benguela Province
- In office 1989–1995
- Preceded by: João Lourenço
- Succeeded by: Dumilde das Chagas Rangel

Minister of External Relations
- In office 17 March 1976 – 20 October 1984
- Preceded by: José Eduardo dos Santos
- Succeeded by: José Eduardo dos Santos

Personal details
- Born: 15 May 1929 Benguela, Portuguese Angola (now Angola)
- Died: 26 June 2010 (aged 81) Luanda, Angola

Paulo Teixeira Jorge (May 15, 1929 – June 26, 2010) was an Angolan politician who served as the Foreign Minister of Angola from 1976 to 1984. He also served as governor of Benguela province, and as President of the National Assembly of Angola. He was one of the first leaders of the liberation struggle of Angola against Portuguese colonial domination. During his exile in France in the early 1960s he worked on the shop floor of a factory.

== See also ==
- Foreign relations of Angola

Political offices
Preceded by José Eduardo dos Santos	Foreign Minister of Angola; 1976–1984	Succeeded by José Eduardo dos Santos
Preceded by Noé da Silva Saúde	Provincial Commissioner of Cuanza Norte; 1986-1989	Succeeded by Francisco Vieira Dias
Preceded by João Lourenço	Provincial Commissioner of Benguela; 1989–1995	Succeeded by Dumilde Rangel
