= Angola–India relations =

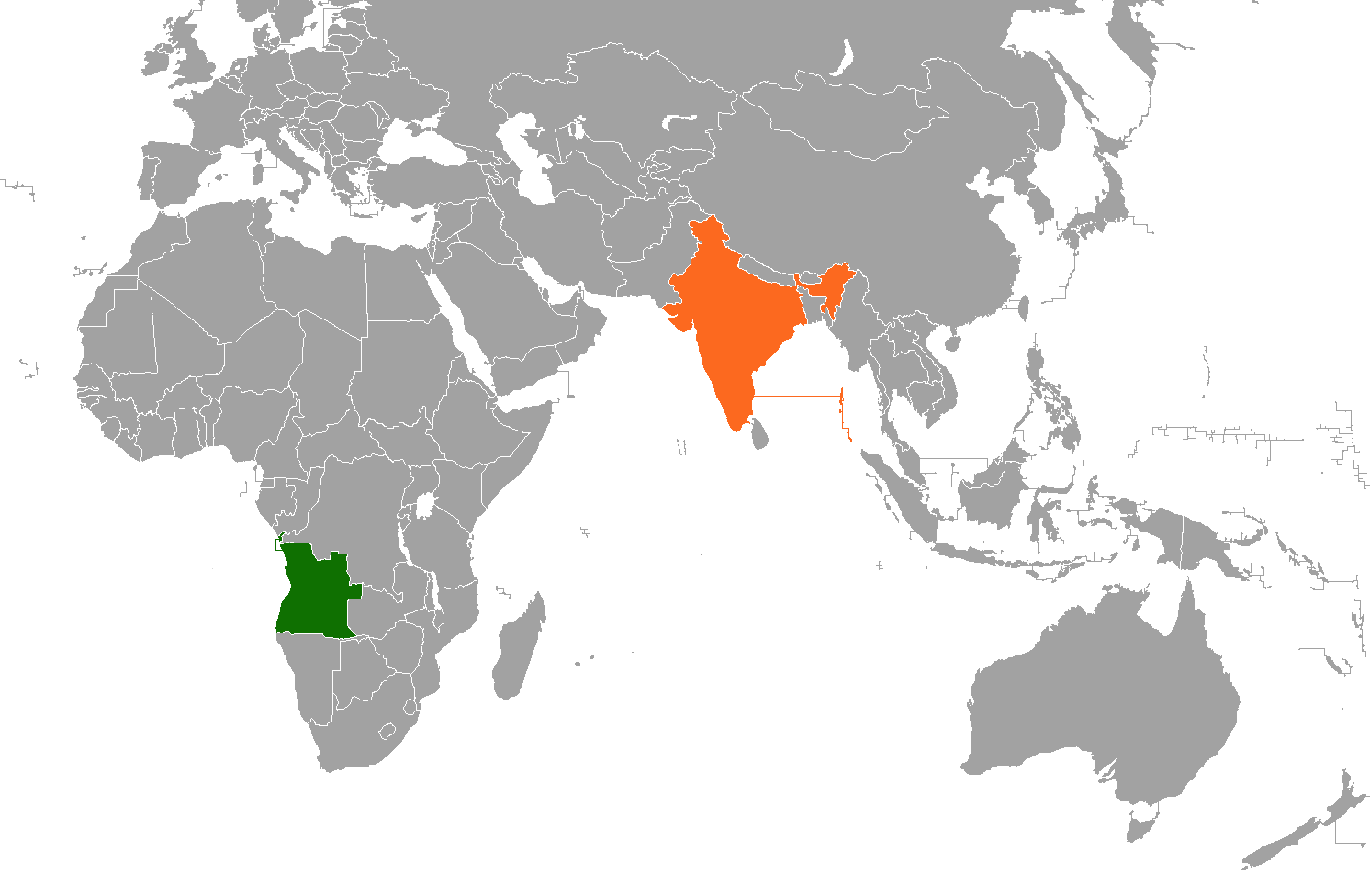
- Angola: India

Diplomatic mission
- Embassy of Angola, New Delhi: Embassy of India, Luanda

Envoy
- Ambassador Manuel Eduardo dos Santos e Silva Bravo: Ambassador Pratibha Parkar

Angola–India relations refers to the international relations that exist between Angola and India.

India has an embassy in Luanda. Angola has an embassy in New Delhi.

== History ==
The Indian state of Goa and Angola as a whole were both former Portuguese colonies. India supported the Angolan freedom struggle against Portuguese colonial rule until Angola gained independence in 1975. Since then India has maintained close ties to MPLA (Popular Movement for the Liberation of Angola). India officially established diplomatic relations with Angola in 1985. India is a founding member of the Non-Aligned Movement, and Angola joined the organization in 1976.

There have been several visits by the leaders of the two countries. Rajiv Gandhi became the first Indian Prime Minister to visit Angola in May 1986. José Eduardo dos Santos became the first Angolan President to visit India in April 1987. Angolan Foreign Minister João Bernardo de Miranda visited India in May 2006 and signed a protocol on foreign office consultations. Prime Minister Manmohan Singh met with President Santos on the sidelines of the 35th G8 summit at L'Aquila, Italy on 10 July 2009. Prime Minister Narendra Modi met with President João Lourenço on the sidelines of the 10th BRICS summit in Johannesburg, South Africa on 26 July 2018.

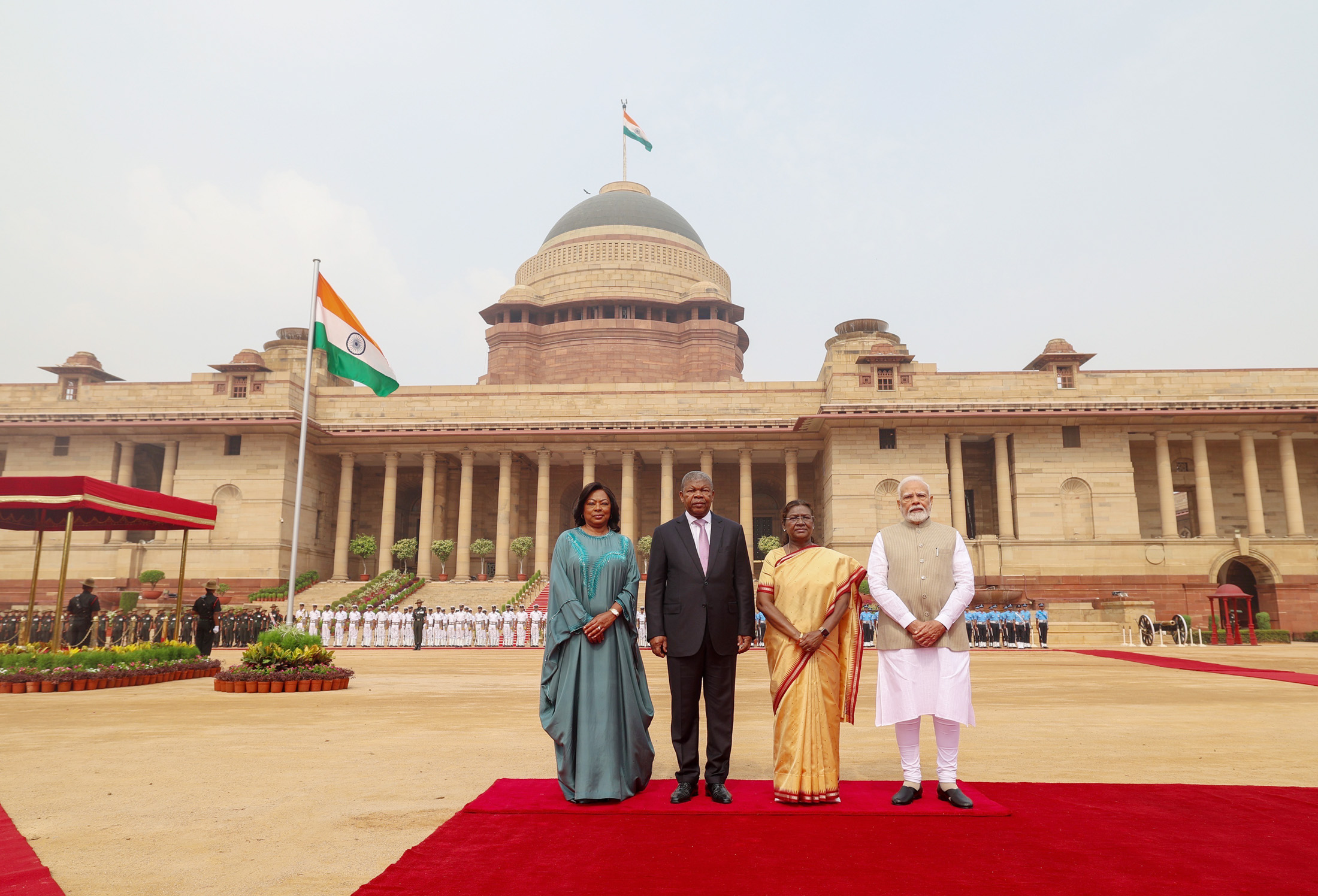
PM Narendra Modi and President Droupadi Murmu at the Ceremonial Reception of the President of the Republic of Angola, Joao Lourenco

Angola and India signed an agreement on 30 January 2017 to establish a bilateral commission. The first India-Angola Joint Commission Meeting was co-chaired virtually by Foreign Ministers S. Jaishankar and Tete António on 7 September 2020. The two sides conducted a comprehensive review of bilateral relations and agreed to diversify trade relations particularly in the areas of health, pharmaceuticals, defence, agriculture, food processing, digitization and telecom. Three MoUs on health, training and visa facilitation were signed during the meeting. Angola supports India's candidacy for a permanent seat in a reformed United Nations Security Council. Angola voted for India's election to the UNSC's non-permanent seat for 2021–22.

Angolan President Joao Laurenco visited India in May 2025 and held wide ranging talks including trade & investment, defence, energy, skilling, railways development partnership, health & pharmaceuticals, cultural cooperation and people to people ties. They also discussed regional and global issues of mutual interest.

== Economic relations ==
Indian companies are involved in the retail, hospitality, agriculture, plastics, scrap metal, steel, trading, garments, real estate and other sectors in Angola. The Confederation of Indian Industry (CII) and the Federation of Indian Chambers of Commerce & Industry sent delegations to Angola in November 2013 and May 2014 respectively. The first collaborative business event between the two countries, called "Business Opportunities between India and Angola", was jointly organized by the Angola-India Chamber of Commerce, CII, and the Agency of Private Investment, Promotion and Exporters (AIPEX) on 3 September 2020. The Embassy of India in Luanda, in cooperation with the Gems and Jewellery Export Promotion Council of India (GJEPC) and the Angola-India Chamber of Commerce, organized a conference on 3 December 2020 attended by delegates from the Angolan state-owned diamond companies Endiama and Sodiam, and private companies from India.

Angola and India signed an MoU on cooperation in the oil and gas sector in October 2010 in New Delhi. Engineers India was involved in the construction of the Lobito oil refinery.

=== Trade ===
India is Angola's 3rd largest trading partner, and accounts for about 10% of Angola's total exports. Angola is the second largest African exporter of oil to India, after Nigeria. Crude oil forms the bulk of Angola's exports to India and as a result the value of bilateral trade is heavily dependent on oil prices. Bilateral trade between Angola and India reached a peak of US$7.16 billion in 2012–13, driven primarily by high oil prices, but declined to $3.93 billion in 2019–20.

India's imports/exports from/to Angola (US$ Millions)
	2014-15	2015-16	2016-17	2017-18	2018-19	2019-20	2020-21(Apr to Feb 21)
Import	4617	2767	2596	4324	4027	3649.02	1563.47
Export	552	223	155	235	282.36	285.10	230.30
Total	5169	2990	2751	4559	4309.36	3934.12	1793.77

== Development assistance ==
The Indian Foreign Ministry gifted ambulances manufactured by Mahindra & Mahindra to the Government of Angola as a goodwill gesture in December 2005. India extended a $40 million line of credit (LOC) to Angola for the rehabilitation of the Moçâmedes Railway in 2005. The Exim Bank of India provided three LOCs worth $28.8 million for agricultural equipment and Indian tractors. The State Bank of India, which opened its representative office in Luanda in April 2005, also extended commercial lines of credit of US$15.8 million for the supply of tractors and the importing of capital equipment from India. The Government of India extended a $30 million LOC to set up an industrial park and a $15 million LOC to establish a cotton ginning and spinning plant in Angola in 2008–09. In June 2012, the Exim Bank provided a $23 million LOC for supply of tractors, implements and related spares.

India offered Angola a line of credit of $100 million in May 2021 for the purchase of naval boats, interceptor craft, and construction of naval vessels and slipways.

Citizens of Angola are eligible for scholarships under the Indian Technical and Economic Cooperation Programme (ITEC) and the Indian Council for Cultural Relations.

== Indians in Angola ==
There were around 3,500 Indians living in Angola as of July 2021. The community primarily works in offshore oil fields, catering, supermarkets, trading and other services, and in industries dealing in plastics, metal, steel and garments.

== See also ==
- Indian Embassy in Angola
