= Assunção dos Anjos =

Angolan diplomat (1946–2022)

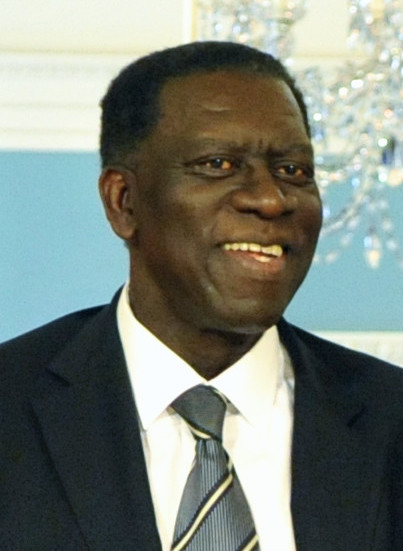
- Anjos in 2009

Advisor to the President of Angola
- In office 2010–2022

Ambassador of Angola to Spain
- In office 1993–1999
- Preceded by: Kamu de Almeida
- Succeeded by: Gen. Pedro Sebastião

Ambassador of Angola to France
- In office 1999–2002
- Preceded by: Boaventura Cardoso
- Succeeded by: Ambrósio Lukoki

Ambassador of Angola to Portugal
- In office 2002–2008
- Preceded by: Osvaldo Serra Van-Dúnem
- Succeeded by: José Marcos Barrica

Foreign Minister of Angola
- In office 2008–2010
- Preceded by: João Miranda
- Succeeded by: Georges Chicoti

Personal details
- Born: 13 February 1946 Luanda, Portuguese West Africa (now Angola)
- Died: 12 December 2022 (aged 76) Madrid, Spain

Assunção Afonso de Sousa dos Anjos (13 February 1946 – 12 December 2022) was an Angolan diplomat who was Angola's Minister of External Relations from 2008 to 2010.

== Biography ==
Anjos was born in Luanda and worked at the Ministry of External Relations as Director for Africa and the Middle East. He was Director of the Cabinet of the First Deputy Prime Minister, Director of the Cabinet of the Minister of Planning, and then Director of the Cabinet of the President of the Republic from 1979 to 1993, under José Eduardo dos Santos. Subsequently, he was Ambassador to Spain until being dismissed from that post at his own request in November 1999. He was then Ambassador to France; in October 2002, while still holding that post, he strongly denied that Angola had any military presence in Côte d'Ivoire during that country's civil war.

Anjos was instead appointed Ambassador to Portugal in early August 2002 and was sworn into that post by President dos Santos on 18 December 2002. He was later appointed Minister of External Relations on 1 October 2008, having been recalled from his post as Ambassador to Portugal immediately beforehand. In 2010 he was replaced by Georges Chicoti and subsequently appointed a presidential adviser.

Anjos was a member of the Central Committee of the Popular Movement for the Liberation of Angola (MPLA).

== See also ==
- List of foreign ministers in 2010
- Foreign relations of Angola

Political offices
Preceded by Kamu de Almeida	Ambassador of Angola to Spain; 1993–1999	Succeeded by Gen. Pedro Sebastião
Preceded by Boaventura Cardoso	Ambassador of Angola to France; 1999–2002	Succeeded by Ambrósio Lukoki
Preceded by Osvaldo Serra Van-Dúnem	Ambassador of Angola to Portugal; 2002–2008	Succeeded by José Marcos Barrica
Preceded by João Bernardo de Miranda	Foreign Minister of Angola; 2008–26 November 2010	Succeeded by Georges Rebelo Chicoti
