= List of ambassadors of Turkey to Angola =

The list of ambassadors of Turkey to Angola provides a chronological record of individuals who have served as the diplomatic representatives of the Republic of Turkey to the Republic of Angola.

== List of ambassadors ==
Ambassador	Term start	Term end	Ref.
Hamit Osman Olcay	8 September 2011	1 May 2013	
Ahmet İhsan Kızıltan	15 October 2013	15 January 2019	
Alp Ay	15 January 2019	13 March 2023	
Ufuk Ekici	14 March 2023	Present	

== See also ==
- Angola–Turkey relations
