= List of foreign ministers in 2010 =

This is a list of foreign ministers in 2010.

== Africa ==
- Algeria - Mourad Medelci (2007–2013)
- Angola -
  1. Assunção dos Anjos (2008–2010)
  2. Georges Rebelo Chicoti (2010–2017)
- Benin - Jean-Marie Ehouzou (2008–2011)
- Botswana - Phandu Skelemani (2008–2014)
- Burkina Faso - Alain Bédouma Yoda (2008–2011)
- Burundi - Augustin Nsanze (2009–2011)
- Cameroon - Henri Eyebe Ayissi (2007–2011)
- Cape Verde - José Brito (2008–2011)
- Central African Republic - Antoine Gambi (2009–2013)
- Chad - Moussa Faki (2008–2017)
- Comoros -
  1. Ahmed Ben Said Jaffar (2006–2010)
  2. Fahmi Said Ibrahim El Maceli (2010–2011)
- Republic of Congo - Basile Ikouébé (2007–2015)
- Democratic Republic of Congo - Alexis Thambwe Mwamba (2008–2012)
- Côte d'Ivoire -
  1. Youssouf Bakayoko (2006–2010)
  2. Jean-Marie Kacou Gervais (2010–2011) / Alcide Djédjé (2010–2011) (rival government)
- Djibouti - Mahamoud Ali Youssouf (2005–present)
- Egypt - Ahmed Aboul Gheit (2004–2011)
- Equatorial Guinea - Pastor Micha Ondó Bile (2003–2012)
- Eritrea - Osman Saleh Mohammed (2007–present)
- Ethiopia -
  1. Seyoum Mesfin (1991–2010)
  2. Hailemariam Desalegn (2010–2012)
- Gabon - Paul Toungui (2008–2012)
- The Gambia -
  1. Ousman Jammeh (2009–2010)
  2. Mamadou Tangara (2010–2012)
- Ghana - Muhammad Mumuni (2009–2013)
- Guinea -
  1. Alexandre Cécé Loua (2009–2010)
  2. Bakary Fofana (2010)
  3. Edouard Niankoye Lamah (2010–2012)
- Guinea-Bissau - Adelino Mano Quetá (2009–2011)
- Kenya -
  - Moses Wetangula (2008–2012)
  - George Saitoti (acting) (2010–2011)
- Lesotho - Mohlabi Tsekoa (2007–2015)
- Liberia -
  1. Olubanke King-Akerele (2007–2010)
  2. Toga McIntosh (2010–2012)
- Libya - Moussa Koussa (2009–2011)
- Madagascar -
  1. Ny Hasina Andriamanjato (2009–2010)
  2. Hyppolite Ramaroson (2010–2011)
- Malawi - Etta Banda (2009–2011)
- Mali - Moctar Ouane (2004–2011)
- Mauritania - Naha Mint Mouknass (2009–2011)
- Mauritius - Arvin Boolell (2008–2014)
- Morocco - Taieb Fassi Fihri (2007–2012)
  - Western Sahara - Mohamed Salem Ould Salek (1998–2023)
- Mozambique - Oldemiro Balói (2008–2017)
- Namibia -
  1. Marco Hausiku (2004–2010)
  2. Utoni Nujoma (2010–2012)
- Niger -
  1. Aïchatou Mindaoudou (2001–2010)
  2. Aminatou Maïga Touré (2010–2011)
- Nigeria -
  1. Ojo Maduekwe (2007–2010)
  2. Martin Ihoeghian Uhomoibhi (acting) (2010)
  3. Henry Odein Ajumogobia (2010–2011)
- Rwanda - Louise Mushikiwabo (2009–2018)
- São Tomé and Príncipe -
  1. Carlos Tiny (2008–2010)
  2. Manuel Salvador dos Ramos (2010–2012)
- Senegal - Madické Niang (2009–2012)
- Seychelles -
  1. James Michel (2009–2010)
  2. Jean-Paul Adam (2010–2015)
- Sierra Leone -
  1. Zainab Bangura (2007–2010)
  2. J. B. Dauda (2010–2012)
- Somalia -
  1. Ali Ahmed Jama Jangali (2009–2010)
  2. Yusuf Hassan Ibrahim (2010)
  3. Mohamed Abdullahi Omaar (2010–2012)
  - Somaliland -
    1. Abdillahi Mohamed Duale (2006–2010)
    2. Abdillahi Mohamed Omer (2010–2013)
  - Puntland -
    1. Farah Adan Dhala (2009–2010)
    2. Daud Mohamed Omar (2010–2014)
- South Africa - Maite Nkoana-Mashabane (2009–2018)
- Sudan -
  1. Deng Alor (2007–2010)
  2. Ali Karti (2010–2015)
- Swaziland - Lutfo Dlamini (2008–2011)
- Tanzania – Bernard Membe (2007–2015)
- Togo -
  1. Kofi Esaw (2008–2010)
  2. Elliott Ohin (2010–2013)
- Tunisia -
  1. Abdelwahab Abdallah (2005–2010)
  2. Kamel Morjane (2010–2011)
- Uganda - Sam Kutesa (2005–2021)
- Zambia - Kabinga Pande (2007–2011)
- Zimbabwe - Simbarashe Mumbengegwi (2005–2017)

== Asia ==
- Afghanistan -
  1. Rangin Dadfar Spanta (2006–2010)
  2. Zalmai Rassoul (2010–2013)
- Armenia - Eduard Nalbandyan (2008–2018)
- Azerbaijan - Elmar Mammadyarov (2004–2020)
  - Nagorno-Karabakh - Georgy Petrosyan (2005–2011)
- Bahrain - Sheikh Khalid ibn Ahmad Al Khalifah (2005–2020)
- Bangladesh – Dipu Moni (2009–2013)
- Bhutan - Ugyen Tshering (2008–2013)
- Brunei - Pengiran Muda Mohamed Bolkiah (1984–2015)
- Cambodia - Hor Namhong (1998–2016)
- China - Yang Jiechi (2007–2013)
- East Timor - Zacarias da Costa (2007–2012)
- Georgia - Grigol Vashadze (2008–2012)
  - Abkhazia -
    1. Sergei Shamba (2004–2010)
    2. Maxim Gvinjia (2010–2011)
  - South Ossetia - Murat Dzhioyev (1998–2012)
- India - S. M. Krishna (2009–2012)
- Indonesia - Marty Natalegawa (2009–2014)
- Iran -
  1. Manouchehr Mottaki (2005–2010)
  2. Ali Akbar Salehi (2010–2013)
- Iraq - Hoshyar Zebari (2003–2014)
  - Kurdistan - Falah Mustafa Bakir (2006–2019)
- Israel - Avigdor Lieberman (2009–2012)
  - Palestinian Authority - Riyad al-Maliki (2007–present)
- Japan -
  1. Katsuya Okada (2009–2010)
  2. Seiji Maehara (2010–2011)
- Jordan - Nasser Judeh (2009–2017)
- Kazakhstan – Kanat Saudabayev (2009–2011)
- North Korea - Pak Ui-chun (2007–2014)
- South Korea -
  1. Yu Myung-hwan (2008–2010)
  2. Kim Sung-hwan (2010–2013)
- Kuwait - Sheikh Mohammad Sabah Al-Salem Al-Sabah (2003–2011)
- Kyrgyzstan -
  1. Kadyrbek Sarbayev (2009–2010)
  2. Ruslan Kazakbayev (2010–2012)
- Laos - Thongloun Sisoulith (2006–2016)
- Lebanon - Ali Al Shami (2009–2011)
- Malaysia - Anifah Aman (2009–2018)
- Maldives - Ahmed Shaheed (2008–2011)
- Mongolia - Gombojavyn Zandanshatar (2009–2012)
- Myanmar - Nyan Win (2004–2011)
- Nepal - Sujata Koirala (2009–2011)
- Oman - Yusuf bin Alawi bin Abdullah (1982–2020)
- Pakistan - Shah Mehmood Qureshi (2008–2011)
- Philippines - Alberto Romulo (2004–2011)
- Qatar - Sheikh Hamad bin Jassim bin Jaber Al Thani (1992–2013)
- Saudi Arabia - Prince Saud bin Faisal bin Abdulaziz Al Saud (1975–2015)
- Singapore - George Yeo (2004–2011)
- Sri Lanka -
  1. Rohitha Bogollagama (2007–2010)
  2. G. L. Peiris (2010–2015)
- Syria - Walid Muallem (2006–2020)
- Taiwan - Timothy Yang (2009–2012)
- Tajikistan - Khamrokhon Zaripov (2006–2013)
- Thailand - Kasit Piromya (2008–2011)
- Turkey - Ahmet Davutoğlu (2009–2014)
- Turkmenistan - Raşit Meredow (2001–present)
- United Arab Emirates - Sheikh Abdullah bin Zayed Al Nahyan (2006–present)
- Uzbekistan -
  1. Vladimir Norov (2006–2010)
  2. Elyor Ganiyev (2010–2012)
- Vietnam - Phạm Gia Khiêm (2006–2011)
- Yemen - Abu Bakr al-Qirbi (2001–2014)

== Europe ==
- Albania -
  1. Ilir Meta (2009–2010)
  2. Edmond Haxhinasto (2010–2012)
- Andorra - Xavier Espot Miró (2009–2011)
- Austria - Michael Spindelegger (2008–2013)
- Belarus - Sergei Martynov (2003–2012)
- Belgium - Steven Vanackere (2009–2011)
  - Brussels-Capital Region - Jean-Luc Vanraes (2009–2013)
  - Flanders - Kris Peeters (2008–2014)
  - Wallonia - Rudy Demotte (2009–2014)
- Bosnia and Herzegovina - Sven Alkalaj (2007–2012)
- Bulgaria -
  1. Rumiana Jeleva (2009–2010)
  2. Nickolay Mladenov (2010–2013)
- Croatia - Gordan Jandroković (2008–2011)
- Cyprus - Markos Kyprianou (2008–2011)
  - Northern Cyprus - Hüseyin Özgürgün (2009–2013)
- Czech Republic -
  1. Jan Kohout (2009–2010)
  2. Karel Schwarzenberg (2010–2013)
- Denmark -
  1. Per Stig Møller (2001–2010)
  2. Lene Espersen (2010–2011)
  - Greenland - Kuupik Kleist (2009–2013)
  - Faroe Islands - Jørgen Niclasen (2008–2011)
- Estonia - Urmas Paet (2005–2014)
- Finland - Alexander Stubb (2008–2011)
- France -
  1. Bernard Kouchner (2007–2010)
  2. Michèle Alliot-Marie (2010–2011)
- Germany - Guido Westerwelle (2009–2013)
- Greece -
  1. George Papandreou (2009–2010)
  2. Dimitrios Droutsas (2010–2011)
- Hungary -
  1. Péter Balázs (2009–2010)
  2. János Martonyi (2010–2014)
- Iceland - Össur Skarphéðinsson (2009–2013)
- Ireland - Micheál Martin (2008–2011)
- Italy - Franco Frattini (2008–2011)
- Latvia -
  1. Māris Riekstiņš (2007–2010)
  2. Aivis Ronis (2010)
  3. Ģirts Valdis Kristovskis (2010–2011)
- Liechtenstein - Aurelia Frick (2009–2019)
- Lithuania -
  1. Vygaudas Ušackas (2008–2010)
  2. Rasa Juknevičienė (acting) (2010)
  3. Audronius Ažubalis (2010–2012)
- Luxembourg - Jean Asselborn (2004–present)
- Republic of Macedonia - Antonio Milošoski (2006–2011)
- Malta - Tonio Borg (2008–2012)
- Moldova - Iurie Leancă (2009–2013)
  - Transnistria - Vladimir Yastrebchak (2008–2012)
- Monaco - Franck Biancheri (2008–2011)
- Montenegro - Milan Roćen (2006–2012)
- Netherlands -
  1. Maxime Verhagen (2007–2010)
  2. Uri Rosenthal (2010–2012)
- Norway - Jonas Gahr Støre (2005–2012)
- Poland - Radosław Sikorski (2007–2014)
- Portugal - Luís Amado (2006–2011)
- Romania - Teodor Baconschi (2009–2012)
- Russia - Sergey Lavrov (2004–present)
- San Marino - Antonella Mularoni (2008–2012)
- Serbia - Vuk Jeremić (2007–2012)
  - Kosovo -
    1. Skënder Hyseni (2008–2010)
    2. Vlora Çitaku (acting) (2010–2011)
- Slovakia -
  1. Miroslav Lajčák (2009–2010)
  2. Mikuláš Dzurinda (2010–2012)
- Slovenia - Samuel Žbogar (2008–2012)
- Spain -
  1. Miguel Ángel Moratinos (2004–2010)
  2. Trinidad Jiménez (2010–2011)
- Sweden - Carl Bildt (2006–2014)
- Switzerland - Micheline Calmy-Rey (2003–2011)
- Ukraine -
  1. Petro Poroshenko (2009–2010)
  2. Kostyantyn Gryshchenko (2010–2012)
- United Kingdom
  1. David Miliband (2007–2010)
  2. William Hague (2010–2014)
  - Scotland - Fiona Hyslop (2009–2020)
- Vatican City - Archbishop Dominique Mamberti (2006–2014)

== North America and the Caribbean ==
- Antigua and Barbuda - Baldwin Spencer (2005–2014)
- The Bahamas - Brent Symonette (2007–2012)
- Barbados - Maxine McClean (2008–2018)
- Belize - Wilfred Elrington (2008–2020)
- Canada - Lawrence Cannon (2008–2011)
  - Quebec -
    1. Pierre Arcand (2008–2010)
    2. Monique Gagnon-Tremblay (2010–2012)
- Costa Rica -
  1. Bruno Stagno Ugarte (2006–2010)
  2. René Castro (2010–2011)
- Cuba - Bruno Rodríguez Parrilla (2009–present)
- Dominica -
  1. Vince Henderson (2008–2010)
  2. Roosevelt Skerrit (2010–2014)
- Dominican Republic - Carlos Morales Troncoso (2004–2014)
- El Salvador - Hugo Martínez (2009–2013)
- Grenada -
  1. Peter David (2008–2010)
  2. Karl Hood (2010–2012)
- Guatemala - Haroldo Rodas (2008–2012)
- Haiti - Marie-Michèle Rey (2009–2011)
- Honduras -
  1. Carlos López Contreras (2009–2010)
  2. Mario Canahuati (2010–2011)
- Jamaica - Kenneth Baugh (2007–2012)
- Mexico - Patricia Espinosa (2006–2012)
- Netherlands Antilles - Emily de Jongh-Elhage (2006–2010)
- Nicaragua - Samuel Santos López (2007–2017)
- Panama - Juan Carlos Varela (2009–2011)
- Puerto Rico – Kenneth McClintock (2009–2013)
- Saint Kitts and Nevis -
  1. Denzil Douglas (2008–2010)
  2. Sam Condor (2010–2013)
- Saint Lucia - Rufus Bousquet (2009–2011)
- Saint Vincent and the Grenadines -
  1. Sir Louis Straker (2005–2010)
  2. Douglas Slater (2010–2013)
- Trinidad and Tobago -
  1. Paula Gopee-Scoon (2007–2010)
  2. Surujrattan Rambachan (2010–2012)
- United States of America - Hillary Clinton (2009–2013)

== Oceania ==
- Australia -
  1. Stephen Smith (2007–2010)
  2. Kevin Rudd (2010–2012)
- Fiji - Ratu Inoke Kubuabola (2009–2016)
- French Polynesia - Gaston Tong Sang (2009–2011)
- Kiribati - Anote Tong (2003–2016)
- Marshall Islands - John Silk (2009–2012)
- Micronesia - Lorin S. Robert (2007–2019)
- Nauru - Kieren Keke (2007–2011)
- New Zealand - Murray McCully (2008–2017)
  - Cook Islands -
    1. Jim Marurai (2009–2010)
    2. Robert Wigmore (2010)
    3. Tom Marsters (2010–2013)
  - Niue - Toke Talagi (2008–2020)
  - Tokelau -
    1. Foua Toloa (2009–2010)
    2. Kuresa Nasau (2010–2011)
- Palau -
  1. Sandra Pierantozzi (2009–2010)
  2. Ramon Rechebei (acting) (2010)
  3. Victor Yano (2010–2013)
- Papua New Guinea -
  1. Sam Abal (2007–2010)
  2. Don Polye (2010–2011)
- Samoa - Tuilaepa Aiono Sailele Malielegaoi (1998–2021)
- Solomon Islands -
  1. William Haomae (2007–2010)
  2. Peter Shanel Agovaka (2010–2012)
- Tonga -
  1. Feleti Sevele (2009–2010)
  2. Sialeʻataongo Tuʻivakanō (2010–2014)
- Tuvalu -
  1. Apisai Ielemia (2006–2010)
  2. Enele Sopoaga (2010)
  3. Apisai Ielemia (2010–2013)
- Vanuatu -
  1. Joe Natuman (2009–2010)
  2. George Wells (2010-2011)

== South America ==
- Argentina -
  1. Jorge Taiana (2005–2010)
  2. Héctor Timerman (2010–2015)
- Bolivia - David Choquehuanca (2006–2017)
- Brazil - Celso Amorim (2003–2011)
- Chile -
  1. Mariano Fernández Amunátegui (2009–2010)
  2. Alfredo Moreno Charme (2010–2014)
- Colombia -
  1. Jaime Bermúdez (2008–2010)
  2. María Ángela Holguín (2010–2018)
- Ecuador -
  1. Fander Falconí (2008–2010)
  2. Lautaro Pozo-Malo (acting) (2010)
  3. Ricardo Patiño (2010–2016)
- Guyana - Carolyn Rodrigues (2008–2015)
- Paraguay - Héctor Lacognata (2009–2011)
- Peru - José Antonio García Belaúnde (2006–2011)
- Suriname -
  1. Lygia Kraag-Keteldijk (2005–2010)
  2. Winston Lackin (2010–2015)
- Uruguay -
  1. Pedro Vaz (2009–2010)
  2. Luis Almagro (2010–2015)
- Venezuela - Nicolás Maduro (2006–2013)
