= Ministry of External Relations =

Ministry of External Relations can refer to:

- Ministry of External Relations (Angola)
- Ministry of External Relations (Brazil)
- Ministry of Foreign Affairs (Dominican Republic)
