= Maria Elizabeth Simbrão de Carvalho =

Angolan diplomat

Ambassador of Angola to Belgium, Luxembourg and the European Union
- In office April 2009 – February 2018
- President: José Eduardo dos Santos; João Lourenço
- Succeeded by: Georges Rebelo Pinto Chikoti

Personal details
- Education: Agostinho Neto University
- Occupation: Diplomat
- Profession: Lawyer

Maria Elizabeth Simbrão de Carvalho is an Angolan diplomat who was the ambassador to Belgium, Luxembourg and the European Union from 2009 to 2018. She was replaced by Georges Rebelo Pinto Chikoti.

Simbrão studied at Angola's Agostinho Neto University where she earned a degree in law. She joined the Ministry of External Relations in 1976, where she undertook several notable assignments, in particular serving as the president's secretary for foreign affairs from 1986 to 1990. After a period as counselor at the Angolan Embassy in Bonn, she served as director general of Legal and Consular Affairs and Litigation at the Foreign Ministry from 1994 to 1999. She was then appointed consul general in Lisbon where she served until 2007.

She was appointed Angolan ambassador to Belgium, Luxembourg and the European Union in April 2009. In January 2013, on Angola's National Culture Day, she emphasized the need for investment in arts courses, the preservation of built heritage and cultural research in Angola.

After nine years of service, Simbrão was relieved of her functions as Belgian ambassador by President João Lourenço in February 2018. She was replaced by Georges Rebelo Pinto Chikoti who served until March 2020.
