= Kamu =

Kamu may refer to:

- KAMU-FM and KAMU-TV, public broadcasting stations run by Texas A&M University in College Station, Texas
- Jowsheqan va Kamu, a city in Iran
- Kamu language, an extinct indigenous Australian language
- Kamu, the original company behind Easy-Anti-Cheat

== People ==
- Luagalau Levaula Kamu, Samoan lawyer and Cabinet Minister
- Okko Kamu, Finnish oconductor and violinist
- Kamu de Almeida, Angolan diplomat
- Kamu Grugier-Hill, American professional football linebacker
- Kamu Mukherjee, Bengali actor
