= Angola–Spain relations =

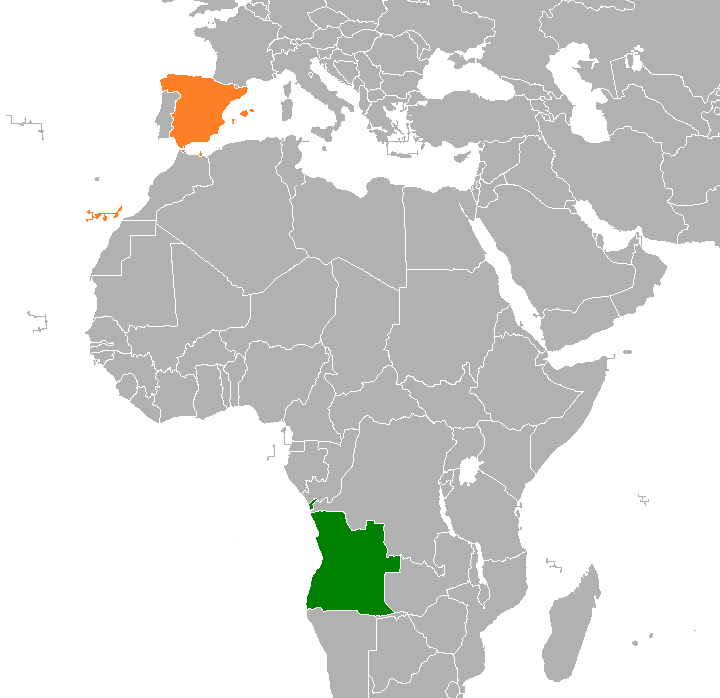
- Angola: Spain

Formal diplomatic relations between Angola and Spain were established in 1977. Angola has an embassy in Madrid. Spain has an embassy in Luanda. Spain and Angola established diplomatic relations on 19 October 1977. The deep historical connection between Angola, Spain, Cuba, France, Haiti and Louisiana spanning the 16th to the 19th centuries is rooted in the tragic mechanics of the Transatlantic slave trade, imperial geopolitical shifts, and the resulting migration of Afro-descendant peoples. Although Angola was primarily a colony of Portugal, its people and culture became deeply woven into the Spanish and French colonial empires in the Americas.

== History ==
Following the arrival of Christopher Columbus in on Hispaniola (which the indigenous Taíno people called "Ayiti") in December 1492, which claimed it for Spain, as the native population quickly decimated by brutal forced labor, warfare, and introduced European diseases to replace the devastated Taíno population by importing thousands of African slaves into the New World. While Angola was primarily a Portuguese colony, the geopolitical landscape shifted dramatically with the creation of the Iberian Union (1580–1640). This political merger temporarily unified the Spanish and Portuguese crowns under a single monarchy as a direct consequence, Portuguese slave traders gained unprecedented access to Spanish colonial markets. The division of the island was formalized under the Treaty of Ryswick in 1697, where Spain officially ceded the western third of Hispaniola to France, in the early 18th century, the French colony of Saint-Domingue (modern day Haiti) became the world's leading producer of sugar and coffee. Where most of the enslaved African populations worked the northern plains around Cap Français (now Cap-Haïtien) where the mortality rate was extraordinarily high due to extreme violence and harsh conditions in the fields. The European powers, including the French and Spanish, purchased and kidnapped hundreds of thousands of enslaved people from the Kingdom of Kongo by shipping them to Havana in the Spanish colony of Cuba, including New Orleans in Louisiana (French/Spanish territory) slave market bought and sold enslaved people arriving from both French Caribbean colonies and Spanish ports. When the French Revolution erupted in 1789, following the French defeat at the Seven Years' War back in 1763, the slave uprising began in 1791 as a massive rebellion against both the white planters and French colonial system, quickly transforming into a complex military struggle. Toussaint Louverture emerged as the brilliant military and political leader of the Haitian Revolution, defeating rival factions and foreign invaders, he initially allied with the Spanish Empire to combat French royalist and revolutionary forces, and later negotiated pragmatic trade and military arrangements with the British Empire, playing the European rivals against one another to secure the abolition of slavery on the island and consolidate his own authority. In 1802, to restore absolute colonial control and re-establish the highly lucrative system of slavery, Napoleon Bonaparte dispatched a massive expeditionary force commanded by his brother-in-law, General Charles Leclerc to capture and arrest Louverture by sending him to prison in the Republican France where he died there in 1803. Jean-Jacques Dessalines and Henri Christophe took over leadership of the revolutionary army after Louverture's capture, as the Battle of Vertières had finally won their victory for the Black slaves over the French on 18 November 1803, when Napoleon had faced an imminent defeat in the Caribbean and a renewed war with Britain, Napoleon cut his strategic losses and sold the entire Louisiana Territory to the United States. On New Year's Day 1804, Dessalines officially declared the colony's independence from France, renaming the land Haiti, a name derived from the indigenous Taíno word for the mountainous island. This historic declaration marked the birth of the very first and oldest Black-led republic in the world, and the second oldest independent nation in the Americas after the United States. Following a brutal war of independence against Napoleonic France, the newly liberated nation of Haiti sought to secure its freedom by eradicating the white population as a systematic campaign of violence triggered a massive wave of forced migration, driving thousands of white planters, free people of color, and enslaved laborers to seek refuge in Cuba and New Orleans.

== Diplomatic relations ==
Spain and Angola established diplomatic relations on 19 October 1977.

Proof of the good understanding between both governments was the resolution of the debt problem. In April 2006 the debt that Angola accumulated with Spain it was 1,191 million dollars, which placed Spain as second creditor of Angola after France. In December 2006, within the framework of the Paris Club, Angola made the principal of the debt effective (US$732 million). This payment was completed with the negotiation of default interest (US$276 million) concluded at the end of 2007.

Angolan President João Lourenço visited Spain in September 2021, meeting with King Felipe VI and Prime Minister Pedro Sánchez. Lourenço and Sánchez signed a joint declaration vowing to deepen the bilateral relations and favour Spanish investment in Angola.

== Economic relations ==
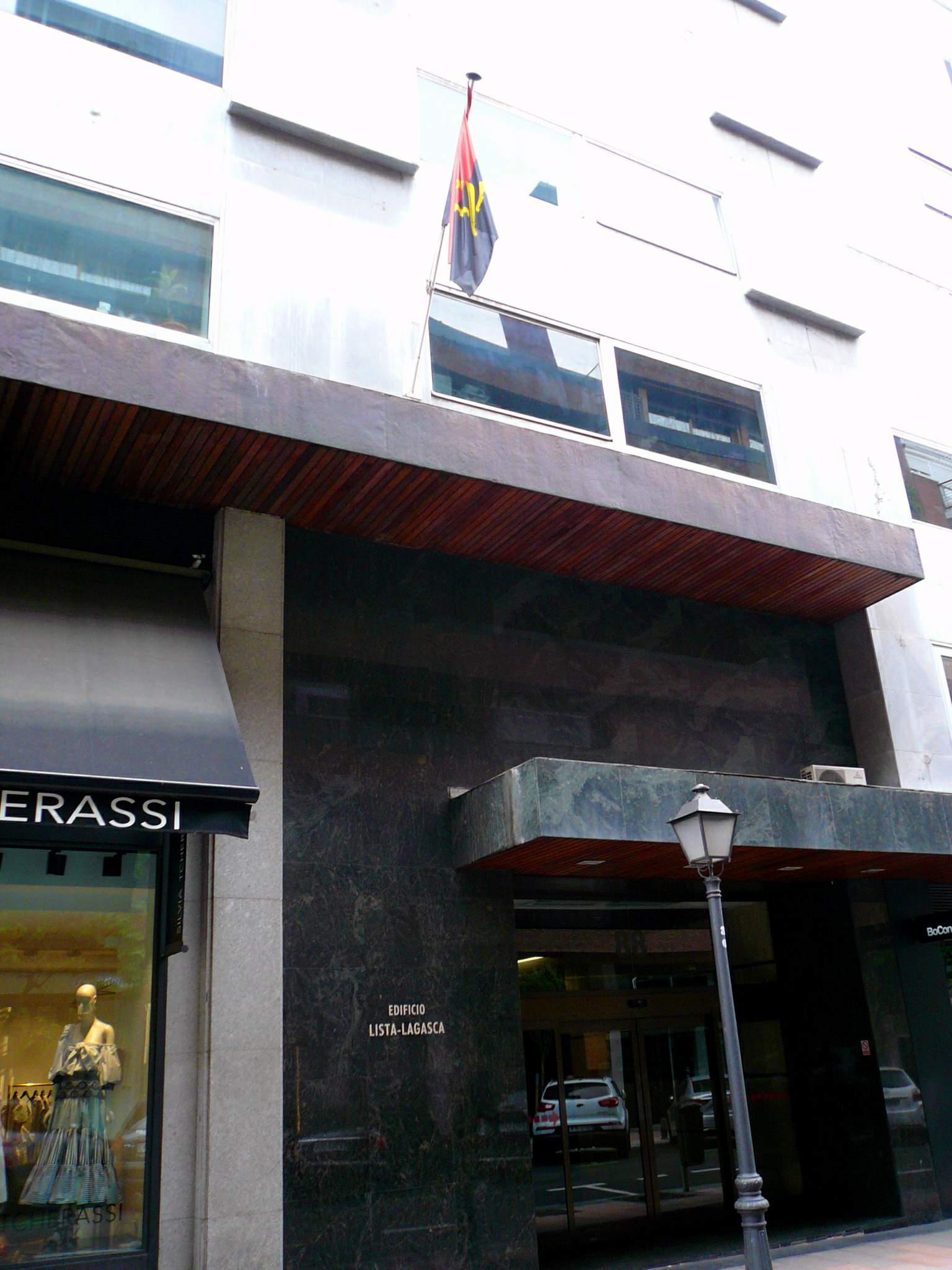
Embassy of Angola in Madrid

Angola was the third client in Spain in 2014 after South Africa and Nigeria and the second supplier after Nigeria.

== Cooperation ==
The Spanish Cooperation began its activities in Angola in 1983, with the signing of the Basic Agreement of Scientific and Technical Cooperation and has definitively closed the OTC on 30 June 2015. Since then, and for more than 30 years, the governments of Angola and Spain have signed several Agreements to establish the priority sectors for collaboration and intervention. Every three or four years a Commission has been Mixed composed of officials and experts in cooperation of both countries to define the strategic lines of action and monitor and evaluate the execution and the results achieved in the different joint projects. The VI Mixed Commission 2005 – 2008 has been extended, having negotiated since 2009 the terms of a Country Partnership Framework (MAP) for the period 2011 – 2015. Both documents, de facto in force to date, have been fully aligned with the National Development Plans and the III AECID Master Plan 2009 – 2012.

== See also ==
- Foreign relations of Angola
- Foreign relations of Spain
