= Manuel Domingos Augusto =

Angolan diplomat, politician and journalist

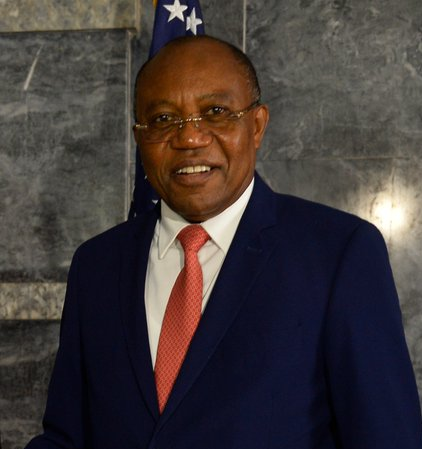
- Augusto in 2019

Minister of External Relations of Angola
- In office 28 September 2017 – 9 April 2020
- Preceded by: Georges Chicoti
- Succeeded by: Tete António

1st Head of the Angolan Diplomatic Mission in South Africa
- In office 1992–1994
- Preceded by: Post established
- Succeeded by: Manuel A.D. Rodrigues Kito

Ambassador of Angola to Zambia
- In office 1995–1999
- Preceded by: Pedro Mavunza
- Succeeded by: Doukoui de Castro

Ambassador of Angola to Ethiopia
- In office 2005–2010
- Preceded by: Miguel Neto
- Succeeded by: Arcanjo do Nascimento

Personal details
- Born: 2 September 1957 Luanda, Portuguese Angola
- Died: 5 June 2026 (aged 68) Luanda, Angola
- Party: MPLA

Manuel Domingos Augusto (2 September 1957 – 5 June 2026) was an Angolan journalist, politician and diplomat who was the Minister of External Relations of Angola from 2017 to 2020.

Augusto died in Luanda on 5 June 2026, aged 68.

Political offices
Preceded by n/a	Head of the 1st Angolan Diplomatic Mission in South Africa; 1992–1994	Succeeded by Manuel Alexandre D. Rodrigues Kito
Preceded by Pedro Fernando Mavunza	Ambassador of Angola to Zambia; 1995–1999	Succeeded by Luís Doukoui Paulo de Castro
Preceded by	Vice-Minister for the Media; 1999–2005	Succeeded by
Preceded by Miguel Gaspar Fernandes Neto	Ambassador of Angola to Ethiopia; 2005–2010	Succeeded by Arcanjo Maria do Nascimento
Preceded by Georges Rebelo Chicoti	Secretary of State for External Relations; 2010–2017	Succeeded by Téte António
Preceded by Georges Rebelo Chicoti	Minister of External Relations; 2017–2020	Succeeded by Téte António
