= Angola–Nigeria relations =

- Angola: Nigeria

Relations between Angola and Nigeria, primarily based on their roles as oil exporting nations, are cooperative and sturdy. Both are members of the Organization of the Petroleum Exporting Countries, the African Union, and other multilateral organizations.

== History ==
In 1975, Nigeria was a driving force within the Organisation of African Unity (OAU) to recognize the legitimacy of the new Angolan regime. During the 1980s and 1990s, the countries' economic interests were linked to different Western powers, preventing them from forming significant alliances.

The Angolan government arrested Henry Okah, the spokesman of the Movement for the Emancipation of Niger Delta (MEND), the largest rebel group in Nigeria, in September 2007 on arms trafficking charges. Okah had tried to board a plane at Luanda airport bound for South Africa when authorities apprehended him. Angola and Nigeria have not signed an extradition treaty, partly because Nigeria still uses capital punishment and Angolan law forbids extraditing suspects to nations in which they may face the punishment of death. Angolan President José Eduardo dos Santos agreed to extradite Okah on 21 November, but his lawyers asked the government to reconsider. In January 2008, Attorney General João Maria de Sousa said the Angolan government had not yet decided whether it would extradite Okah. Okah was finally extradited on 15 February 2008.

== Economic relations ==
In 2008, Angola took Nigeria's place as Africa's top oil producer.

The Angolan Community in Nigeria (CAN) was created in 2009 by the Angolan embassy in Nigeria.

Trade between Angola and Nigeria was worth US$2 million in 2016. Nigerian exports to Angola amounted to US$442,000 and Angolan exports to Nigeria amounted to US$1.56 million.

== See also ==
- Foreign relations of Angola
- Foreign relations of Nigeria
