= Angola–Uruguay relations =

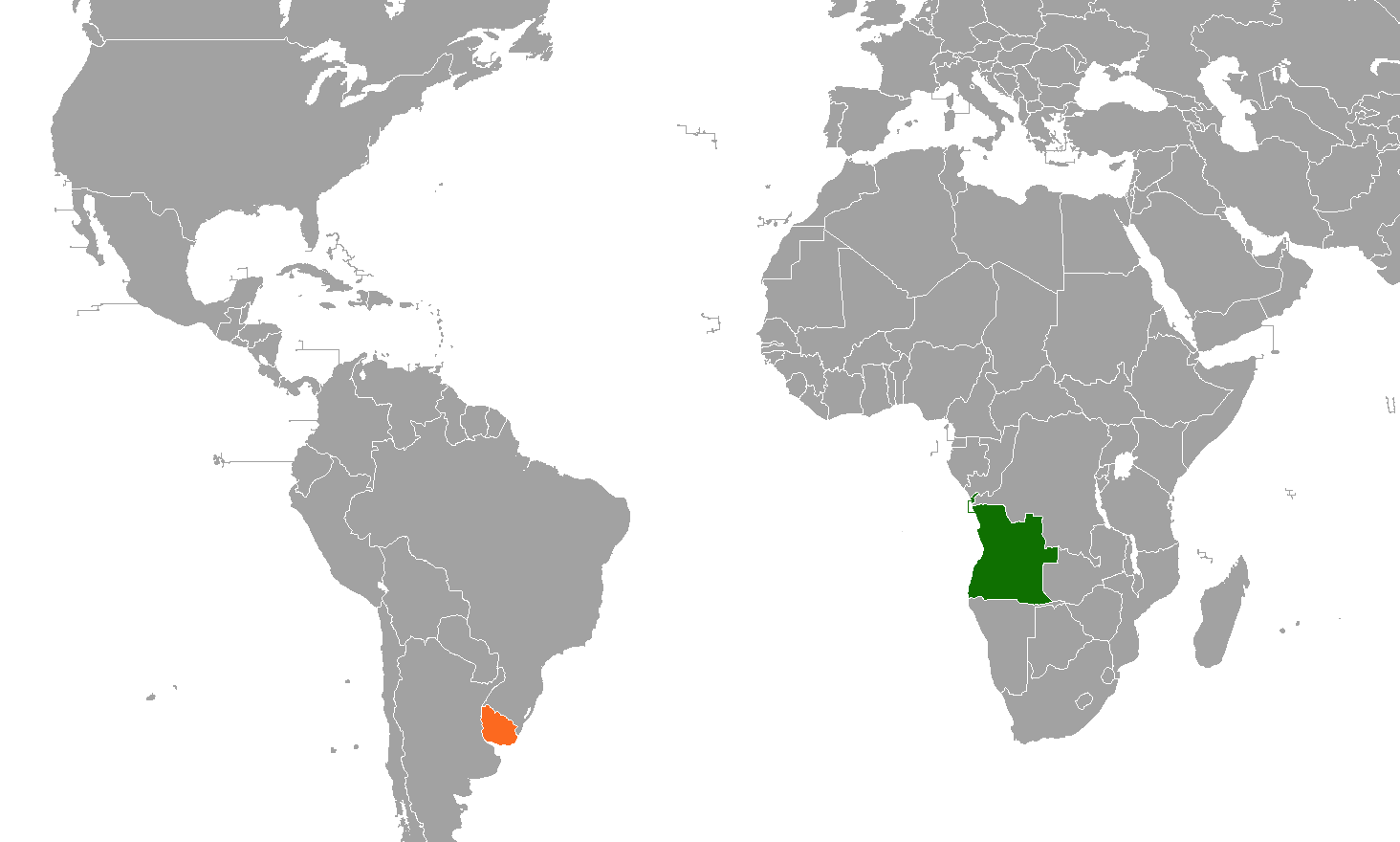
- Angola: Uruguay

Angola and Uruguay are members of the Group of 77 and the United Nations.

== History ==
Angola and Uruguay established diplomatic relations on 26 March 1988. Initial relations between both nations were limited and took place mainly at the United Nations and through South–South cooperation.

In 2014, Uruguay opened its first resident embassy in Luanda. The decision to open the embassy was to strengthen the bilateral relations that have deepened in the last decade driven by the mutual interest shown by both governments and since the establishment of some Angolan direct investments in the production sector of Uruguay. In January 2017, Angola opened a consulate-general in Montevideo.

In February 2019, Uruguayan Foreign Minister, Rodolfo Nin Novoa, paid a visit to Angola. During his visit, Foreign Minister Novoa met with Angolan President João Lourenço and both nations signed numerous bilateral agreements and discussed business and the increase of investments between both nations.

In 2021, Uruguay closed its embassy in Luanda due to budget restraints.

== Bilateral agreements ==
Both nations have signed several agreements such as an Agreement between the Ministry of Agriculture and Rural Development of Angola and the Ministry of Livestock, Agriculture and Fisheries of Uruguay (2002); Agreement between the Institute of Agricultural and Veterinary Research of Angola and the National Agricultural Research Institute of Uruguay (2002); Agreement on Economic, Scientific, Technical and Cultural cooperation (2003); Memorandum of Understanding for the establishment of political consultations (2008); Agreement on the suppression of visas in diplomatic, official and service passports (2013); Agreement for the training of personnel between the Eduardo dos Santos Foundation (FESA) and the University of Uruguay (2017); Agreement for visa facilitation (2019); Agreement on customs cooperation (2019) and a Memorandum of Understanding for Cooperation between both nations diplomatic academies (2019).

== Diplomatic missions ==
- Angola is accredited to Uruguay from its embassy in Brasília, Brazil and has a consulate-general in Montevideo.
- Uruguay is accredited to Angola from its embassy in Pretoria, South Africa.

== See also ==
- Foreign relations of Angola
- Foreign relations of Uruguay
