= Domingos Culolo =

Angolan diplomat and lawyer

Ambassador of Angola to Poland
- In office 2011–2019
- Preceded by: Lizeth Pena
- Succeeded by: Feliciano António Dos Santos

Attorney General of Angola
- In office 1993–2002
- Preceded by: Antero de Abreu
- Succeeded by: Augusto da Costa Carneiro

Ambassador of Angola to Slovakia
- In office 2002–2006
- Preceded by: Manuel Quarta Punza
- Succeeded by: Alberto Correia Neto

Ambassador of Angola to Sweden
- In office 2006–2011
- Preceded by: Leovigildo da Costa e Silva
- Succeeded by: Brito Sozinho

Personal details
- Born: November 24, 1941 (age 84) Quibocolo, Uíge
- Party: MPLA

Domingos Culolo (born 1941 in Uíge Province) is an Angolan diplomat and lawyer. He is Angola's ambassador to Sweden. Prior to his appointment in Sweden, Culolo served as top diplomat to Slovakia. He also served as Attorney General and Deputy Attorney General.
