= Ambrósio Lukoki =

Angolan politician and diplomat

Provincial Commissioner of Uíge
- In office 1977–1978
- Preceded by: Simão Bráz
- Succeeded by: Massunga Kota

Minister of Education
- In office 1978–1981
- Succeeded by: Augusto Lopes Teixeira

Ambassador of Angola to France
- In office 2002–2006
- Preceded by: Assunção dos Anjos
- Succeeded by: Víctor Lima

Ambassador of Angola to Tanzania
- In office 2006–2018
- Preceded by: Brito Sozinho

Personal details
- Born: December 7, 1940 Quibocolo, Uíge
- Died: 1 October 2018 (aged 77) Luanda, Angola
- Party: MPLA

Ambrósio Lukoki (7 December 1940 – 1 October 2018) was an Angolan politician, educator, and diplomat serving as the Ambassador of Angola to Tanzania.

He served as Minister of Education in the 1970s before his appointment as Minister of Ideology, Information, and Culture.
