= Brito Sozinho =

Angolan diplomat

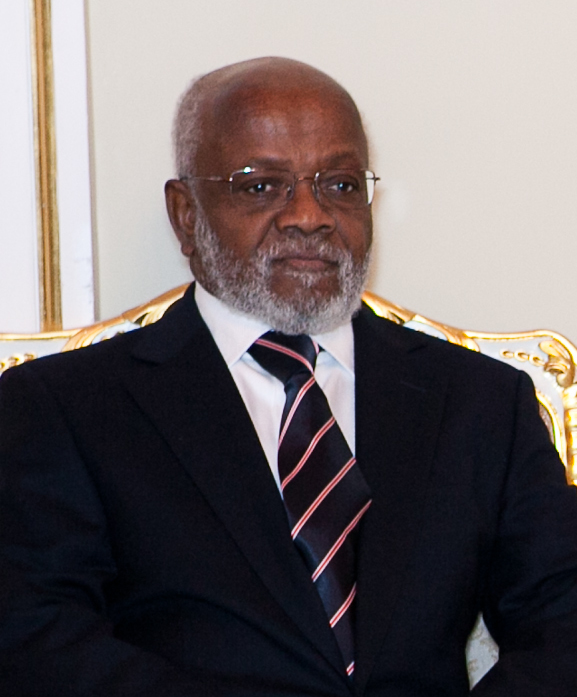

Ambassador of Angola to Mozambique
- Incumbent
- Assumed office 2014
- Preceded by: Isaías Jaime Vilinga

Ambassador of Angola to Nigeria
- In office 1987–2000
- Preceded by: Armindo Vieira
- Succeeded by: Evaristo Domingos Kimba

Ambassador of Angola to Tanzania
- In office 2000–2006
- Preceded by: José Agostinho Neto
- Succeeded by: Ambrósio Lukoki

Ambassador of Angola to Guinea-Bissau
- In office 2006–2011

Ambassador of Angola to Sweden
- In office 2011–2014
- Preceded by: Domingos Culolo
- Succeeded by: Isaías Jaime Vilinga

Personal details
- Born: António Brito Domingos Sozinho; 1941 (age 84–85) Angola
- Party: MPLA

António Brito Domingos Sozinho, also known as Brito Kissonde, is an Angolan diplomat. He is currently the ambassador to Mozambique, Swaziland, Malawi and Madagascar. Sozinho previously served as the ambassador to Nigeria, Benin, Togo, Tanzania, Kenya, Uganda, Seychelles, Burundi, Guinea-Bissau, Senegal, and Sweden.

Sozinho was a part of the liberation struggle in Angola, and is a very influential diplomat in the Ministry of External Relation in Angola. He is one of wealthiest Angolans and has earned a stake in the country's oil industry.

During his time as Angola's representative to Guinea-Bissau, Sozinho was given the National Order of Merit of Co-operation and Development, which is Guinea-Bissau's highest award.
