= Antero de Abreu =

Attorney General of Angola
- Succeeded by: Domingos Culolo

Ambassador of Angola to Italy
- In office 1993–1999
- Preceded by: Mawete João Baptista
- Succeeded by: Boaventura Cardoso

Personal details
- Born: February 22, 1927 Luanda, Angola
- Died: 15 March 2017 (aged 90) Viana do Castelo, Portugal
- Party: MPLA
- Education: Law
- Occupation: Lawyer, poet, film critic, attorney general and ambassador

Antero Alberto Ervedosa de Abreu, better known as Antero Abreu (February 22, 1927 – March 15, 2017), was an Angolan lawyer, attorney general, ambassador, author and poet.

== Early life and education ==
Antero de Abreu was born in Luanda, Angola, and completed his primary, secondary and high school studies there. He studied law in Portugal, first in Coimbra and then later in Lisbon. As a student in Lisbon he became the leader of the Casa dos estudantes do Império (House of Students of the Empire).

== Career ==
=== Activist and poet ===
As an anti-colonial activist, he began writing poetry on the subject, where it was gradually noticed and picked up by various magazines and publications. He remained a productive writer up until his death.

=== Angolan Writers Union ===
He was the founder of the Angolan Writers Union, as well as the Academy of Arts and Social Sciences.

=== Attorney General and Ambassador ===
He was also the second Attorney General of then People's Republic of Angola and ambassador to Italy.

== Published works ==
- A tua Voz Angola (Your Voice Angola) (1978), Luanda, União dos Escritores Angolanos
- Poesia Intermitente (Intermittent Poetry) (1978), (1987, Lisboa, Edições 70)
- Permanência (Permanence) (1979), (1987, Lisboa, Edições 70)
- Textos sem Pretexto (Texts without Pretext) (1992)

== Death ==
De Abreu died on March 15, 2017, at the age of 90, of an illness.
