= Angola–Vietnam relations =

Angolan - Vietnamese relations
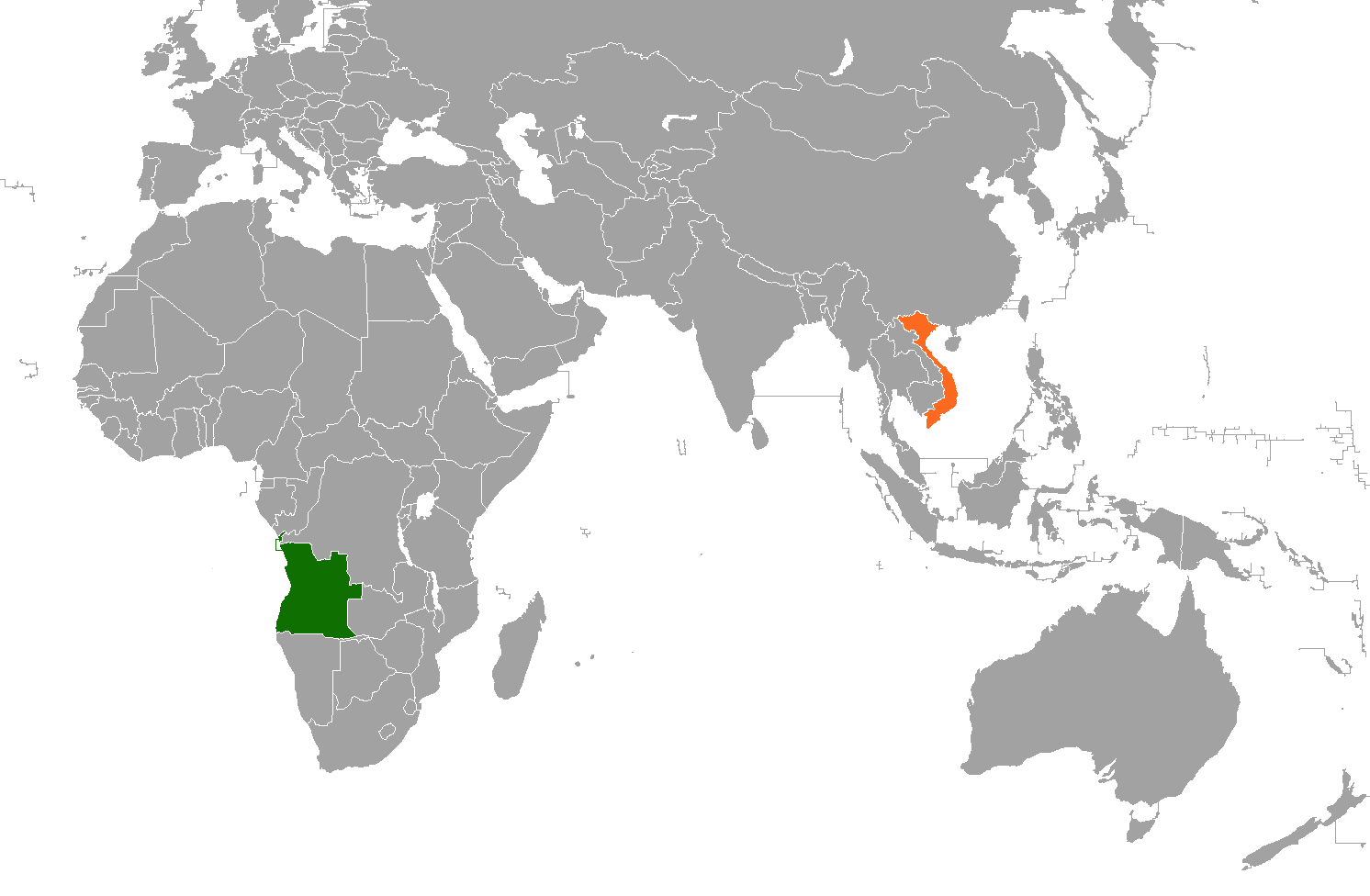
- Angola: Vietnam

Relations between Angola and Vietnam relations were established in August 1971, four years before Angola gained its independence, when future President of Angola Agostinho Neto visited Vietnam. Angola and Vietnam have been steadfast partners as both transitioned from Cold War-era foreign policies of international communism to pro-Western pragmatism following the fall of the Soviet Union. Angola has an embassy in Hanoi. Vietnam has an embassy in Luanda.

== Early ties ==
In February 1974, the National Liberation Front of South Vietnam (NLFSV) commended the 1961 attack on Cassanje, the first battle of Angola's war of independence. In January 1975, Nguyễn Hữu Thọ, the leader of NLFSV, gave his "warmest greetings" to the leaders of the (People's Movement for the Liberation of Angola (MPLA), National Liberation Front of Angola (FNLA), National Union for the Total Independence of Angola (UNITA)) following the signing of the Alvor Accords. In late October, Nhân Dân, the Vietnamese Communist Party's official newspaper, effectively endorsed the MPLA, condemning the "imperialist forces and South African racists". Vietnamese Prime Minister Phạm Văn Đồng recognized the People's Republic of Angola on November 12, the day after President Neto declared independence.

== Vietnam War ==
The Vietnam War tempered foreign involvement in Angola's civil war as neither the Soviet Union nor the United States wanted to be drawn into an internal conflict of highly debatable importance in terms of winning the Cold War. CBS newscaster Walter Cronkite spread this message in his broadcasts to "try to play our small part in preventing that mistake this time." The Politburo engaged in heated debate over the extent to which the Soviet Union would support a continued offensive by the MPLA in February 1976. Foreign Minister Andrei Gromyko and Premier Alexei Kosygin led a faction favoring less support for the MPLA and greater emphasis on preserving détente with the West. Leonid Brezhnev, the then head of the Soviet Union, won out against the dissident faction and the Soviet alliance with the MPLA continued even as Neto publicly reaffirmed its policy of non-alignment at the 15th anniversary of the First Revolt.

== China and Russia ==
Angola's continued support for the Vietnamese communists in the face of foreign opposition hurt their relations with the People's Republic of China and the Soviet Union. Agostinho Neto, the president of Angola from 1975 to 1979, condemned the Chinese invasion of Vietnam in February 1979. Neto, distrustful of the Soviet leadership after an attempt on his life, stood with Cuban leader Fidel Castro in Havana when he called Angola, Cuba, and Vietnam the "main anti-imperialist core" in July 1976.

== Agreements ==
The MPLA and Vietnamese Communist Party signed an agreement on cooperation in May 1983, a trade agreement in May 1978 and various economic agreements in 1979, 1984, 1995, 1996, 2002, and 2004.

== Resident diplomatic missions ==
- Angola has an embassy in Hanoi.
- Vietnam has an embassy in Luanda.

== See also ==
- Foreign relations of Angola
- Foreign relations of Vietnam
