= Port Management Association of Eastern and Southern Africa =

The Port Management Association of Eastern and Southern Africa (PMAESA) is a non-profit, inter-governmental organization made up of Port Operators, Government Line Ministries, Logistics and Maritime Service Providers and other port and shipping stakeholders from the Eastern, Western and Southern African and Indian Ocean regions.

== History ==
PMAESA was first established as the Port Management Association of Eastern Africa, in Mombasa, Kenya, in April 1973, under the auspices of the United Nations Economic Commission for Africa (UNECA), following a recommendation made at a meeting of the African Ministers in charge of transport, held in Tunisia in February 1971.

== Membership ==
The members of the group are thus organized:

- Eastern Coastal members: Eritrea, Djibouti, Kenya, Sudan, and Tanzania.
- Southern Coastal members: Angola, Mozambique, Namibia, and South Africa.
- Landlocked members with lake ports: Burundi, Rwanda, Zambia and Zimbabwe,
- Indian Ocean islands: Madagascar, Mauritius, Réunion (an overseas department of France), Seychelles and Zanzibar.

Reporting membership consists of the port authorities of the member countries and ports; please see Category:Port authorities for relevant articles.

== Secretariat ==
The PMAESA Secretariat, based in Mombasa, Kenya was established to coordinate the activities of the Association.

== Activities ==
Maritime safety and protection of the marine environment, transit transport, port operations issues such as port statistics, the public sector-private sector partnership, communication, the cruise industry and regional cooperation are PMAESA's main areas of activity.

== See also ==
- Indian Ocean
- Mozambique Channel
- Piracy in Somalia
- Red Sea
