= Minister of External Relations (Angola) =

Minister of External Relations of Republic of Angola
- Ministro das Relações Exteriores
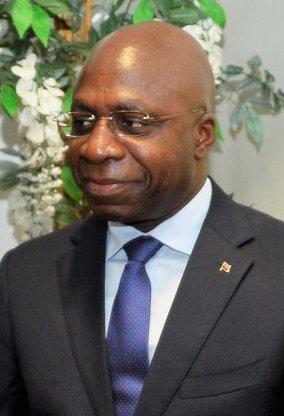
- Incumbent; Tete António since 9 April 2020
- Style: Mister Minister
- Appointer: President of Angola
- Term length: At the pleasure of the president
- Website

Minister of External Relations of Angola (Portuguese: Ministro das Relações Exteriores) is a cabinet level position in the national government. The position was established in 1975 with José Eduardo dos Santos, later president of Angola. Angola's current foreign minister Tete António has served in the role since 9 April 2020.

== List of ministers ==
Ministers of external relations of Angola
Image	Minister	Tenure	President
	José Eduardo dos Santos	1975–1976	Agostinho Neto
	Paulo Teixeira Jorge	1976–1984	Agostinho Neto
	José Eduardo dos Santos	1984–1985	José Eduardo dos Santos
	Afonso Van-Dúnem M'Binda	1985–1989	José Eduardo dos Santos
	Pedro de Castro Van-Dúnem	1989–1992	José Eduardo dos Santos
	Venâncio da Silva Moura	1992–1999	José Eduardo dos Santos
	João Bernardo de Miranda	1999–2008	José Eduardo dos Santos
	Assunção dos Anjos	2008–2010	José Eduardo dos Santos
	Georges Rebelo Chikoti	2010–2017	José Eduardo dos Santos
	Manuel Domingos Augusto	2017–2020	João Lourenço
	Tete António	2020–present	João Lourenço
