= Venâncio da Silva Moura =

Angolan minister and politician

Minister of External Relations
- In office 1992 – January 1999

Personal details
- Born: February 24, 1942 Uíge Province, Angola
- Died: March 6, 1999 (aged 57)

Venâncio da Silva Moura (February 24, 1942 – March 6, 1999) was the Minister of External Relations of Angola from 1992 until a government reshuffle in January 1999 shortly before his death. Born in Uíge Province, he earned a law degree in Portugal. After Angola's independence, he served in the MPLA diplomatic corps. In 1994, he signed the Lusaka Protocol on behalf of the Angolan government.

Political offices
Preceded by Pedro de Castro Van-Dúnem	Foreign Minister of Angola; 1992–January 1999	Succeeded by João Bernardo de Miranda
