= Angola–Mozambique relations =

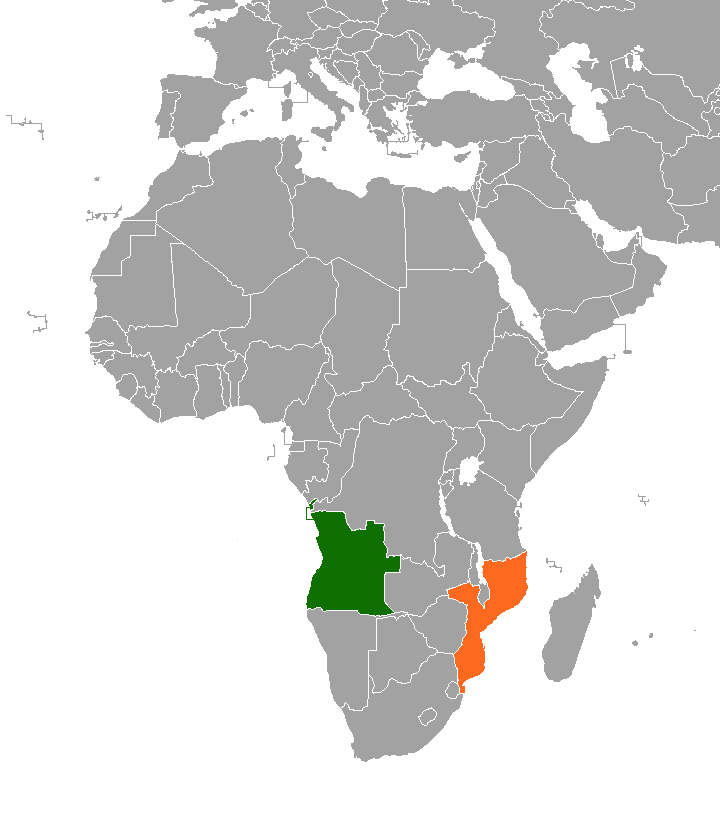
- Angola: Mozambique

Angola–Mozambique relations are the bilateral diplomatic relations between Angola and Mozambique. Both countries are full members of the African Union, the Community of Portuguese Language Countries, the Southern African Development Community, and the United Nations.

== History ==
Both Angola and Mozambique were united for four hundred years as part of the Portuguese Empire. Three years after the end of the Portuguese Colonial Wars, Angola and Mozambique established diplomatic relations on 5 September 1978 when both nations' Presidents, Agostinho Neto of Angola, and Samora Machel of Mozambique, signed Agreements of General Cooperation.

Soon after independence, both nations entered into their respective civil wars which would last until 1992 for Mozambique and until 2002 for Angola. As a result, relations between both nations during this time period were limited. In October 2007, Angolan President, José Eduardo dos Santos, paid a state visit to Mozambique and met with his counterpart, President Armando Guebuza. During the visit, both nations signed nine bilateral agreements.

In the past few years, both countries have developed an intense exchange of visits at the institutional level, which has made it possible to strengthen bilateral cooperation in the judicial field with the exchange of experience and strengthening of relations. In November 2015, Angola pardoned half of Mozambique's debt, thought to be about US$30 million (€26 million). The remainder was to be converted into economic assets in Mozambique.

== Bilateral agreements ==
Both nations have signed several bilateral agreements such as an Agreement of General Cooperation (1978); Agreement in the Fields of Science and Technology (2007); Agreement in Geology and Mines (2007); Agreement in Social Communication Cooperation (2007); Agreement in Higher Education (2007); Agreement in Energy (2007); Agreement in Territorial Administration (2007); Agreement in Fisheries and Agriculture (2007); Memorandum of Understanding in the Field of Civil Construction and Public Works (2007); Memorandum of Understanding for an annual mechanism for consulting and monitoring the application of previously signed agreements (2007); and an Agreement in Tourism with the aim of facilitating the granting of entry visas for citizens of both nations (2016).

== Transportation ==
There are direct flights between both nations with TAAG Angola Airlines.

== Resident diplomatic missions ==
- Angola has an embassy in Maputo.
- Mozambique has an embassy in Luanda.

== See also ==
- Lusofonia Games
- Pink Map
- Portuguese-speaking African countries
