= João Bernardo de Miranda =

Angolan politician (born 1952)

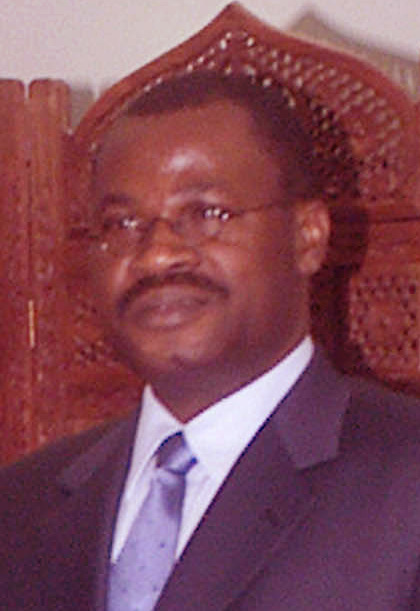

Ambassador of Angola to France
- Incumbent
- Assumed office 2018
- Preceded by: Miguel da Costa

Foreign Minister of Angola
- In office 1999–2008
- Preceded by: Venâncio de Moura
- Succeeded by: Assunção dos Anjos

Governor of Bengo
- In office 2009–2018
- Preceded by: Jorge Dombolo
- Succeeded by: Mara Quiosa

Personal details
- Born: July 18, 1952 (age 74) Caxito-Dande, Bengo, Angola
- Party: Popular Movement for the Liberation of Angola

João Bernardo de Miranda (born July 18, 1952) is an Angolan politician who is currently the Ambassador of Angola in France. He was Minister of External Relations of Angola from January 1999 to October 2008 and the Governor of Bengo Province from 2009 to 2018.

== Early life and education ==
De Miranda was born in Caxito-Dande, Bengo, Angola. He has academic degrees in journalism, law, and international relations.

== Political career ==
=== Early career ===
He began his political career at a very young age by joining the Popular Movement for the Liberation of Angola (MPLA), Angola's ruling party since its independence in 1975. He has held various positions within the party, mostly related to journalism, radio, and propaganda.

In 1990, he was appointed to the post of Vice-Minister for Information, and was chosen to be part of the task force in the Bicesse Accords the following year. He was moved to the Ministry of External Relations soon after. In 1993, he led a high level governmental task force to the exploratory conversations with the National Union for the Total Independence of Angola (UNITA) that took place in Zambia. The outcome of those talks gave way to the signature of the Lusaka Protocol in 1994.

=== Foreign minister ===
He was appointed Minister of External Relations in 1999 during a very critical time, in which the National Assembly of Angola gave President Jose Eduardo dos Santos a substantial amount of power in order to bring about an end to the civil war the nation was facing. In the process, President dos Santos made a series of critical changes within the government that brought a core of loyal and pragmatic individuals such as Fernando da Piedade Dias dos Santos, Kundi Paihama, and de Miranda. Being fully oriented by President dos Santos, the newly appointed minister began an intensive and tireless diplomatic campaign in order to isolate UNITA politically, and weaken its military capabilities through sanctions on its arms suppliers. In the process, he was able to gain international sympathy for the Angolan government's cause.

In 2002, de Miranda secured more than enough votes for Angola in the UN Security Council, as a non-permanent member for the 2002 - 2003 period.

In 2003, de Miranda was featured in the book cover of Leaders of the World - 2003 by the late American author Marilyn Perry. In his book "15 Meses no Ministério dos Negócios Estrangeiros" former Portuguese Minister of Foreign Affairs Diogo Freitas do Amaral described de Miranda as a solid politician with whom he was very pleased to work.

In 2006 de Miranda oversaw, under the watch of President dos Santos, the successful elections in the Democratic Republic of Congo, as part of the stabilizing process in the Great Lakes region.

Miranda was the 32nd candidate on the MPLA's national list in the September 2008 parliamentary election. He won a seat in this election, in which the MPLA won an overwhelming majority in the National Assembly. Following the election, President dos Santos appointed Assunção dos Anjos to replace Miranda as Foreign Minister on October 1, 2008.

Miranda was subsequently the African Union's envoy to Guinea-Bissau at the time of that country's June 2009 presidential election. Following the assassination of presidential candidate Baciro Dabo, he said on state radio that the African Union wanted the election to go ahead as scheduled.

== Writing career ==
De Miranda is also the author of two literary works.

== See also ==
- List of foreign ministers in 2008
- Foreign relations of Andorra

Political offices
Preceded by Venâncio da Silva Moura	Foreign Minister of Angola; January 1999 – October 2008	Succeeded by Assunção dos Anjos
Preceded by Jorge Dombolo	Governor of Bengo; 2009–2018	Succeeded by Mara Quiosa
Preceded by Miguel da Costa	Ambassador of Angola to France; February 2018–	Succeeded by
