= Angola–Turkey relations =

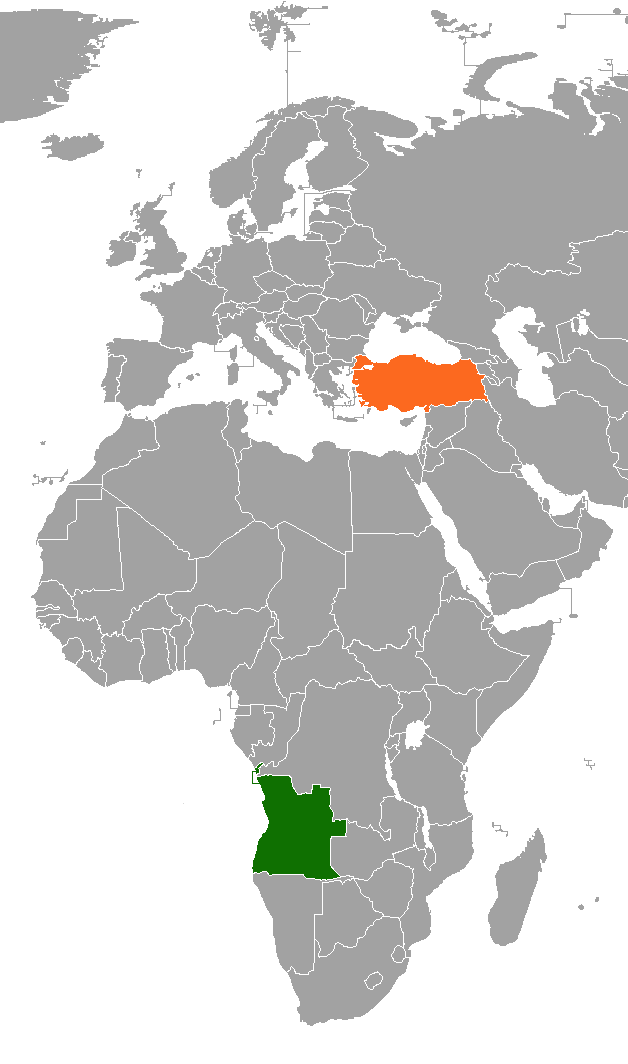
- Angola: Turkey

Angola–Turkey relations are the bilateral relations between Angola and Turkey. The Turkish Embassy in Luanda opened on April 1, 2010. The Angolan embassy in Ankara opened on April 4, 2013.

== Diplomatic relations ==
Turkey recognized Angola in 1975 even though there was pressure from the United States to do otherwise. The Cuban presence in Angola, and SWAPO and ANC bases in Angola led much of the Western world, including the United States to conclude that Angola was becoming a Soviet-sponsored state.

Ignoring Angola's formal commitment to Marxism-Leninism, Turkey and EEC increased foreign assistance grants during the Angolan Civil War.

The Cuban presence in Angola and the South African incursions into Angola determined much of Angola's foreign policy during the 1980s.

During the negotiations to end South Africa’s illegal occupation of Namibia, Turkey tried — in vain — to separate the issues of Namibian independence, Cuban troops in Angola and apartheid. On the grounds that an independent Namibia would enlarge the territory available to countries linked to the Soviet Union, South Africa continued its occupation of Namibia.

Trying to chart a neutral position, Turkey condemned Cuban troops in Angola but also joined Angola in condemning South African incursions into Angola. Trying to rally countries to its side, Turkey pointed out the irony of having Cuban troops guarding American and Turkish companies against attacks by South African commandos that were receiving assistance from the United States.

== Economic relations ==
Trade volume between the two countries was 212 million USD in 2019.

== See also ==
- Foreign relations of Angola
- Foreign relations of Turkey
