= Ministry of External Relations (Angola) =

Government ministry of Angola

The Ministry of External Relations (Portuguese: Ministério das Relações Exteriores) is the Angolan government ministry which oversees the foreign relations of Angola. Tete António is the current foreign minister since 9 April 2020.

== See also ==
- Foreign relations of Angola
