= Angola–Zimbabwe relations =

- Angola: Zimbabwe

Relations between Angola and Zimbabwe have remained cordial since the birth of the states in 1975 and 1980, respectively, during the Cold War. While Angola's foreign policy shifted to a pro-U.S. stance based on substantial economic ties, under the rule of President Robert Mugabe Zimbabwe's ties with the West soured in the late 1990s.

== Angolan Civil War ==
President Mugabe and South African President Nelson Mandela met in Lusaka, Zambia on November 15, 1994, to boost support for the Lusaka Protocol, a peace agreement signed in August that tried to end Angola's civil war. Mugabe and Mandela both said they would be willing to meet with Jonas Savimbi, leader of UNITA, a pro-Western militant group. Mandela asked Savimbi to come to South Africa, but Savimbi did not come.

In 1998 the Angolan government bought ammunition and uniforms from Zimbabwe Defence Industries in violation of the arms embargo established under the Lusaka Protocol. Thanks to foreign arms shipments the Angolan government regained the upper hand, ultimately ending the war in 2002.

== Second Congo War ==
Angola, Namibia, and Zimbabwe intervened militarily in the Second Congo War (1998-2003), fighting on behalf of President Joseph Kabila of the DRC against the Movement for the Liberation of the Congo (MLC) and Uganda, and the Congolese Rally for Democracy and Rwanda. While armed forces loyal to Angola and other neighboring countries withdrew in 2002, Rwandan and Zimbabwean forces stayed.

Transparency International's (TI) Corruption Perception Index (CPI) for 2003 found the governments of Angola and Zimbabwe the most corrupt in Southern Africa. On a scale of 0 to 10 with 0 the most corrupt and 10 the most transparent, TI rated Angola 1.8 and Zimbabwe 2.3, some of the highest corruption ratings in the world.
