= Georges Rebelo Chikoti =

Angolan diplomat (born 1955)

Georges Rebelo Pinto Chikoti
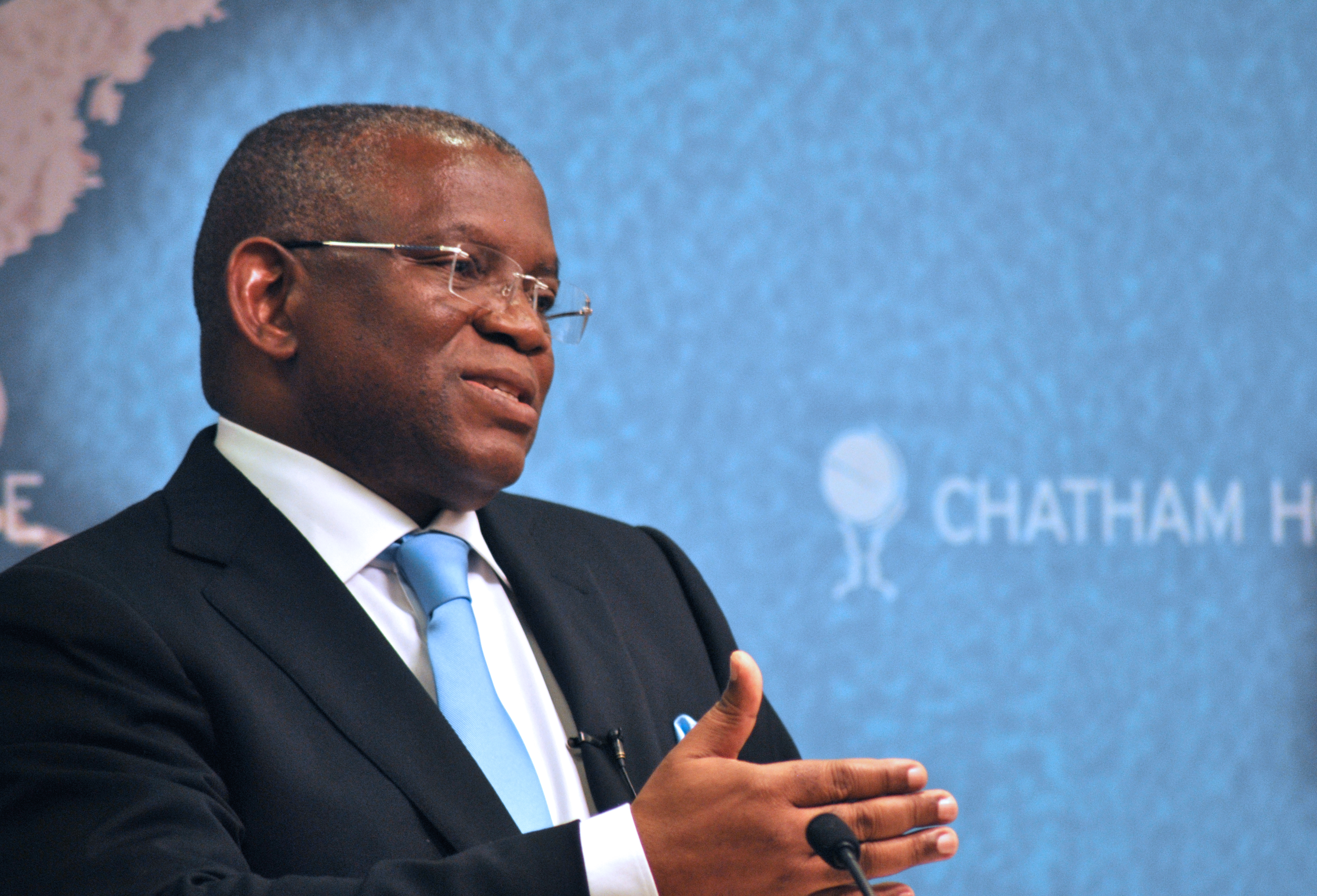

Secretary General of the Organisation of African, Caribbean and Pacific States
- Incumbent
- Assumed office 1 March 2020
- Preceded by: Patrick Gome

Ambassador of Angola to Belgium and Luxembourg and Permanent Representative to the E.U.
- In office 2018–2020
- Preceded by: Maria de Carvalho

Foreign Minister of Angola
- In office 26 November 2010 – 28 September 2017
- Preceded by: Assunção dos Anjos
- Succeeded by: Manuel Domingos Augusto

Personal details
- Born: 16 June 1955 (age 71) Dondi, Huambo Province, Angola
- Education: University of Abidjan, University of Paris

Georges Rebelo Chikoti (born 16 June 1955) is an Angolan diplomat. He is, since 1 March 2020, the Secretary General of the Organization of African, Caribbean and Pacific States (OACPS). He served as Angola's Minister of Foreign Affairs from 2010 to 2017.

== Early life and education ==
Georges Rebelo Pinto Chikoti was born at Dondi in Huambo Province, Angola. Chikoti spent a great part of his childhood in Zambia, returning to Angola in 1975. In the early 1980s he was one of the first high-ranking officials of UNITA and their leader Jonas Savimbi subsequently sent him to Ivory Coast for an education program in 1978. He began studies at the University of Abidjan in 1979. He received a master's degree in Economic Geography in 1985. He then pursued doctoral studies at the University of Paris, receiving a diploma of higher studies (with thesis) in 1986.

== Career ==
Chikoti emigrated to Canada in 1987 and worked at the Imperial Bank of Canada in Toronto for several years before enrolling in the Institute of International Relations and Cooperation at the University of Ottawa in 1989. There he received a diploma in international relations and was also accredited as an assistant professor. At the same time he served as a consultant to the Canadian International Development Agency (CIDA). In 1990, while still living in Canada, he founded the Angolan Democratic Forum, a political party based on his views and philosophy. In 1992, President José Eduardo dos Santos invited Chikoti to return to Angola and serve in the Angolan Government as Deputy Minister of External Relations. In 1994, he was formally appointed ambassador in the Angolan diplomatic corps. He has represented the Angolan government at a number of international conferences and summits. He also headed the Angolan delegation to several sessions of the U.S.-Angola Bilateral Consultative Commission in Luanda and Washington in 1999-2000. A decade after entering the government, he is one of the longest serving senior officials.

Chikoti was one of the first members of UNITA who traveled to Luanda before the Bicesse agreements, implying that the MPLA government could find a 'modus vivendi' with members of UNITA who did not agree with Jonas Savimbi. The Angolan Democratic Forum participated in the first elections and obtained a seat in the National Assembly. Chikoti later left his party and joined the MPLA, eventually ascending to its Central Committee. George Chikoti has many critics within UNITA, who considered his approach to the MPLA as a betrayal.

Chikoti opposed the 2011 military intervention in Libya. He said on 29 March 2011 in Luanda, that the Angolan Government defends dialogue for the resolution of the Libyan deadlock instead of a military intervention. Speaking to the press about the current international matters, Chikoti said that any military intervention may contribute to the worsening of the problem.

== See also ==
- List of current foreign ministers
- List of foreign ministers in 2017
- List of current Angolan ministers
- Foreign relations of Angola

Political offices
Preceded by Assunção dos Anjos	Foreign Minister of Angola; 26 November 2010–28 September 2017	Succeeded by Manuel Domingos Augusto
Preceded by Maria Elizabeth Simbrão de Carvalho	Ambassador of Angola to Belgium and Luxembourg and Permanent Representative to the European Union; 2018-	Succeeded by
