= Kamu de Almeida =

Angolan diplomat

Kamú de Almeida (30 July 1943 – 15 June 2013), in full Sebastião Pascoal de Almeida, was an Angolan diplomat. He was the Ambassador to the Congo, Spain and Egypt. He joined the MPLA in Kinshasa in 1961, and there he joined the Liberation Fight, which ultimately led to Angolan independence in 1975. As the representative of Angola, he signed the Final Act of the Conference of Plenipotentiaries on Termination of the Convention on the Conservation of the Living Resources of the Southeast Atlantic Signed at Rome on the 23rd of October, 1969, at Madrid on 19 July 1990.

== Death ==
Almeida died of an illness on 15 June 2013 in Lisbon at the age of 72.
