= Tete António =

Angolan politician

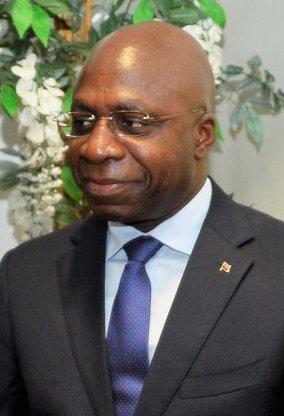
- Tete António in 2019

Minister of External Relations
- Incumbent
- Assumed office 9 April 2020

Personal details
- Born: 22 January 1955 (age 71)
- Education: Agostinho Neto University

Tete António (born 22 January 1955) is an Angolan politician who has been the Minister of External Relations since 2020. He became Council Chairperson of the Southern African Development Community in August 2023. In April 2025, he was a dignitary who attended the funeral of Pope Francis.
