= List of recipients of the Grand Cross of the Order of Prince Henry =

The Order of Prince Henry (Portuguese: Ordem do Infante Dom Henrique) is a Portuguese order of knighthood created on 2 June 1960, to commemorate the quincentenary of the death of the Portuguese prince Henry the Navigator, one of the main initiators of the Age of Discovery. Minor reforms of the constitution of the Order occurred in 1962 and 1980. It is a five-tier order, whose titles are awarded for relevant services to Portugal and for services in the expansion of the Portuguese culture, its history and its values (with a particular focus on its maritime history). The number of members in each grade is restricted by its constitution, and titles are attributed by special decree by the Grand Master of the Order, ex officio the President of Portugal.

The following is a complete list of Portuguese citizens and institutions awarded the Grand Cross of the Order, the second-highest grade and the highest available to people other than heads of state. Foreign people are also eligible for the honour.

Source for the list: "Entidades Nacionais Agraciadas com Ordens Portuguesas", Ordens Honoríficas Portuguesas (Office of the President of Portugal). Retrieved 18 February 2019.

== List ==
- 14 November 1960: Al-Karim Aga Khan IV, United Kingdom
- 24 November 1960: Louis Joxe, former Minister of Justice, France
- 5 December 1960: José Finat y Escrivá de Romaní, former mayor of Madrid, Spain
- 20 December 1960: Edward Chilton, Air Marshal, United Kingdom
- 20 December 1960: Harvey F. Alness, Major, United States
- 20 December 1960: Austregésilo de Athayde, Brazilian journalist
- 20 December 1960: Naval School, Brazil
- 20 January 1961: General Luang Suranarong, former Privy Councilor, Thailand
- 20 January 1961: Commodore Jit Sungkhadul, Royal Navy, Thailand
- 20 January 1961: General Ammuay Chaya Rochana, Thailand
- 25 February 1961: Hua-Cheng Wang, China
- 28 February 1961: Sarah Kubitschek, former first lady of Brazil
- 28 February 1961: Negrão de Lima, former governor of Guanabara, Brazil
- 28 February 1961: Nélson de Melo, former Minister of War, Brazil
- 28 February 1961: Hugo Gouthier de Oliveira Gondim, former diplomat, Brazil
- 28 February 1961: Vitorino de Brito Freire, former deputy, Brazil
- 28 February 1961: Jorge da Silva Leite, Admiral, Brazil
- 28 February 1961: Júlio F. Guillén, former diplomat, Brazil
- 9 March 1961: Julio Guillén Tato, former Member, Royal Spanish Academy
- 9 March 1961: Manuel F. Gran Gilledo, former diplomat, Cuba
- 9 March 1961: Ugo Ferruta, former diplomat, Italy
- 9 March 1961: Charles Burke Elbrick, former ambassador of United States
- 9 March 1961: G. Anderson, Vice-Admiral, United States
- 9 March 1961: Júlio Casas Araujo, former ambassador of Uruguay
- 9 March 1961: Alexis Aminoff, former ambassador of Sweden
- 9 March 1961: Justino Sanson Balladares, former ambassador of Nicaragua
- 9 March 1961: Emilio Saavedra Balmaceda, former diplomat, Chile
- 9 March 1961: Louis Barthélemy, former Captain, Navy, France
- 9 March 1961: Angelo Corrias, former ambassador of Italy
- 9 March 1961: Ciriano Cuenca, Rear Admiral, Argentina
- 9 March 1961: Alfonso Colomina Boti, Naval Captain, Spain
- 9 March 1961: Júlio E. Braceno, former ambassador of Panama
- 9 March 1961: Pascual Cervera y Cervera, former Vice Admiral, Spain
- 9 March 1961: Yuso Isono, former ambassador of Japan
- 9 March 1961: Sérgio Fernandes Lorrain, former ambassador of Chile
- 9 March 1961: Hugo Hergel, former ambassador of Denmark
- 9 March 1961: Bernard de Menthon, former ambassador of France
- 9 March 1961: José António Bermudez Milla, former ambassador of Honduras
- 9 March 1961: Sir Charles Madden, 2nd Baronet, former Commander-in-Chief, Home Fleet Navy, United Kingdom
- 9 March 1961: Ernesto Pablo Mairal, former ambassador of Argentina
- 9 March 1961: José Ibáñez Martín, former Minister of National Education, Spain
- 9 March 1961: Gerhard Wagner, Rear Admiral, Germany
- 9 March 1961: Tarik-Emin Yenisey, former ambassador of Turkey
- 9 March 1961: Leobardo Reynoso, former ambassador of Mexico
- 9 March 1961: Tom Elink Schuurman, former ambassador of Netherlands
- 9 March 1961: Herbert Schaffarczyk, former diplomat, Germany
- 9 March 1961: Hector Escobar Serrano, former ambassador of Argentina
- 11 April 1961: Ramón Sedó Gómez, former diplomat, Spain
- 22 April 1961: Charles Lucet, former diplomat, France
- 16 May 1961: Victor Von Zahn Stranik, former ambassador of Germany
- 14 February 1962: Carlos Arias Navarro, former prime minister of Spain
- 14 February 1962: Adolfo Martín-Gamero, former Minister, Spain
- 14 February 1962: Santiago Ruiz Tabanera, former diplomat, Spain
- 14 February 1962: Fernando Fuentes de Villavicencio, General, Spain
- 14 February 1962: Javier Laviña Berenguer, Colonel, Spain
- 14 February 1962: Mariano Ossorio Arévalo, Marques of Valdavia, Spain
- 14 February 1962: Luiz Alvarez de Estrada y Luque, Baron, Spain
- 14 February 1962: José Navarro, Count of Casa Loja, Spanish Olympian
- 17 May 1962: Cardinal Arcadio Larraona Saralegui, Prefect Emeritus, Congregation of Rites
- 15 June 1962: Vicente Puyal Gil, former politician, Spain
- 19 July 1962: Ademar de Barros, former governor of São Paulo, Brazil
- 5 September 1962: Rafael Morales Hernández, former diplomat, Spain
- 8 September 1962: José Antonio Elola-Olaso, former politician, Spain
- 15 September 1962: José Díaz de Villegas y Bustamante, Spanish soldier and writer
- 30 October 1962: Clemente Araoz, former diplomat, Peru
- 13 November 1962: Javier Ramirez Cardona, former diplomat, Colombia
- 14 December 1962: José Miguel Ruiz y Morales, Spanish doctor
- 25 January 1963: Antero de Ussía y Murúa, former diplomat, Spain
- 26 April 1963: Carlos Jiménez Díaz, Spanish physician
- 3 June 1963: Cardinal Raúl Silva Henríquez, Bishop of Colombo
- 26 June 1963: Rafael Rubio Freire Duarte, former diplomat, Spain
- 10 December 1963: Gerald Wellesley, Prince of Waterloo, Belgium
- 9 January 1964: Alberto Prebisch, former mayor of Buenos Aires, Argentina
- 2 March 1964: Juracy Magalhães, former minister of foreign affairs, Brazil
- 16 March 1964: José Solís Ruiz, former Minister, Spain
- 16 March 1964: Manuel Fraga, former minister of interior, Spain
- 27 April 1964: Joseph Harfouche, former ambassador of Lebanon
- 11 May 1964: Luis Gonzalez Barros, former ambassador of Colombia
- 4 July 1964: Edmond de Beauverger, former ambassador of France
- 29 July 1964: Leopoldo Boado y Endeiza, former Admiral, Spain
- 28 September 1964: Manuel Aznar Zubigaray, former diplomat, Spain
- 28 September 1964: Rafael Fernandez de Bobadilla, former Admiral, Spain
- 28 September 1964: Faustino Ruiz Gonzãlez, former Admiral, Spain
- 6 October 1964: Manuel Valdés Larrañaga, former Procurator of Courts, Spain
- 4 November 1964: Remigio Grillo, former ambassador of Italy
- 6 November 1964: António Villacieros y Benito, former diplomat, Spain
- 12 December 1964: Félix Iturriaga y Codes, former diplomat, Spain
- 12 December 1964: Gonzalo Fernández Puyó, former diplomat, Peru
- 30 February 1965: Olivier Wormser, former diplomat, France
- 3 February 1965: Aurélio de Lira Tavares, former Member of Military Junta, Brazil
- 9 February 1965: Pedro Chaná Cariola, former ambassador, Chile
- 5 June 1965: Raimundo de Moura Britto, former Minister of Health, Brazil
- 5 June 1965: Cardinal Fernando Cento, former Major Penitentiary of Apostolic Penitentiary
- 9 June 1965: Pedro Nieto Antúnez, former Minister of Navy, Italy
- 21 July 1965: Emilio Battista, former senator, Italy
- 13 August 1965: Hans-Christoph Seebohm, former Vice-Chancellor, West Germany
- 7 September 1965: Bernardo Mattarella, former Minister of Foreign trade, Italy
- 7 September 1965: Rafael Couchoud Sebastiá, former diplomat, Spain
- 7 September 1965: José Garcia Usano, former diplomat, Spain
- 7 September 1965: Luis Peralta Espana, former diplomat, Spain
- 7 September 1965: Faustino Armijo y Gallardo, former diplomat, Spain
- 7 September 1965: Juan Schwartz Díaz-Flores, former diplomat, Spain
- 13 October 1965: Cardinal Angelo Dell'Acqua, former Vicar General of Rome
- 13 November 1965: Octacílio Terra Ururahy, former General, Brazil
- 17 January 1966: Juarez Távora, former Minister of Transport, Brazil
- 8 March 1966: Sergio Corrêa da Costa, former diplomat, Brazil
- 8 March 1966: Miguel Ángel Pardo Marchena, former diplomat, Dominican Republic
- 21 March 1966: Karl Gumbel, former State Secretary, Germany
- 21 March 1966: Miguel María de Lojendio Irure, former diplomat, Spain
- 21 March 1966: Esteban Rodriguez Landaeta, former ambassador of Venezuela
- 25 June 1966: Aguinaldo Boulitreau Fragoso, former diplomat, Brazil
- 1 July 1966: Dante Graziosi, former diplomat, Italy
- 6 July 1966: Georges Cabanier, former Grand Chancellor, Legion of Honour, France
- 26 July 1966: Federico Silva Muñoz, former Minister of Public Works, Spain
- 9 September 1966: Marcel-Henri Jaspar, former ambassador of Belgium
- 13 October 1966: Paulo Leão de Moura, former diplomat, Brazil
- 21 October 1966: Cardinal Antonio Samorè, former Librarian, Holy Roman Church
- 10 November 1966: Cardinal Giovanni Nasalli Rocca di Corneliano, Archbishop of Bologna
- 6 December 1966: Ivan Matteo Lombardo, former Minister of Foreign trade, Italy
- 6 December 1966: Cardinal Fernando Quiroga Palacios, Archbishop of Santiago de Compostela
- 20 December 1966: Jorge de Paço Mattoso Maia, First Lieutenant, Brazil
- 21 December 1966: Giovanni Panico, former Nuncio, Vatican City
- 28 January 1967: Erik Dons, former ambassador of Norway
- 16 February 1967: Cesáreo Juste Cadierno, former diplomat, Spain
- 16 February 1967: Juan José Pradera Ortega, former diplomat, Spain
- 16 February 1967: Fernando Olivié González-Pumariega, former diplomat, Spain
- 28 February 1967: Adalberto Pereira dos Santos, former Vice President of Brazil
- 28 February 1967: Alberto Reynaldo Pastor, former politician, Argentina
- 28 February 1967: Décio Palmeiro de Escobar, General, Brazil
- 4 April 1967: Arnaldo Forlani, former prime minister of Italy
- 4 April 1967: Antigono Donati, former deputy, Italy
- 9 May 1967: Ernesto Giuriatti, Admiral, Italy
- 24 June 1967: António Mauro, Monsignor, Vatican City
- 4 July 1967: Francisco D'Álamo Lousada, former diplomat, Brazil
- 24 July 1967: Vasconcelos Torres, former senator, Brazil
- 27 July 1967: Mohammad Reza Pahlavi, former Shah of Iran
- 29 July 1967: Maximilian von Fürstenberg, former Prefect, Congregation for Oriental Churches
- 12 August 1967: Mário Andreazza, former Minister of Transport, Brazil
- 31 August 1967: Kinya Niizeki, former diplomat, Japan
- 23 October 1967: Marquês Raimondo Giustiniani, former ambassador of Italy
- 23 October 1967: Juan Carlos Risso Sieura, former ambassador of Uruguay
- 26 January 1968: Tomás García Rebull, former Procurator of Courts, Spain
- 26 January 1968: Vicente Urcuyo Rodriguez, former ambassador of Nicaragua
- 2 February 1968: Yasusuke Katsumo, former ambassador of Japan
- 2 February 1968: Haroldo Valladão, former attorney general, Brazil
- 2 February 1968: Abreu Sodré, former minister of foreign affairs, Brazil
- 18 March 1968: Robero Incer Barquero, former president, Central Bank of Nicaragua
- 9 April 1968: Ignácio Silva Sucre, former ambassador of Venezuela
- 1 May 1968: Ottone Grisogono, former diplomat, Italy
- 1 May 1968: Gaston De Schepper, former diplomat, Belgium
- 6 June 1968: Infanta Pilar, Duchess of Badajoz, Spain
- 6 June 1968: Ivo Arzua Pereira, former mayor of Curitiba, Brazil
- 6 June 1968: J. A. Ranitz, former ambassador of Netherlands
- 30 June 1968: Cristian Tattenbach, former president of National Assembly, Costa Rica
- 11 July 1968: Bruno Heck, former minister of family affairs, Germany
- 22 July 1968: Edwin Swain Miller, Rear Admiral, United States
- 26 July 1968: Julien Cain, former diplomat, France
- 19 August 1968: G.E. do Nascimentoe Silva, former diplomat, Brazil
- 19 August 1968: Carlos Sylvestre de Ouru Preto, former diplomat, Brazil
- 1 February 1969: Hervé Alphand, former diplomat, France
- 31 March 1969: Ernst Wirmer, former diplomat, Germany
- 31 March 1969: Herbert Müller-Roschach, former diplomat, Germany
- 31 March 1969: Vasco Tristão Letião da Cunha, former ambassador of Brazil
- 1 May 1969: Rudolph Hiemstra, former Commandant General, Defence Forces, South Africa
- 1 May 1969: Luis Edgardo Mercado Jarrín, former prime minister of Peru
- 23 May 1969: Humberto Arguello Tefel, former diplomat, Nicaragua
- 23 May 1969: Leandro Marín Abaunza, former diplomat, Nicaragua
- 23 May 1969: Efraim Castilho Borges, former ambassador of Nicaragua
- 28 May 1969: Fernando Berckemeyer, former ambassador of Peru
- 20 August 1969: Estela Ramualdez Sulit, former ambassador of Philippines
- 22 September 1969: Ángel Sagaz Zubelzu, former ambassador of Spain
- 14 February 1970: Joseph Sigal, former Consul, United States
- 2 March 1970: Diego Uribe Vargas, former minister of foreign affairs, Colombia
- 3 April 1970: Guilherme Sevilla Sacasa, former ambassador of Nicaragua
- 21 May 1970: Enrique Lleras Restrepo, former ambassador of Colombia
- 21 May 1970: Gerard Eliza van Ittersum, former ambassador of Germany
- 10 July 1970: Francisco de Paula da Rocha Lagoa, former Minister of Health, Brazil
- 10 July 1970: Raimundo Padilha, former governor of Rio de Janeiro, Brazil
- 10 July 1970: Gilberto Marinho, former senator, Brazil
- 10 July 1970: Adolpho Justo Bezerra de Menezes, former ambassador of Brazil
- 10 July 1970: Jean Dupong, former president of Council of State, Luxembourg
- 10 July 1970: José Costa Cavalcanti, former politician, Spain
- 10 July 1970: Gregorio López-Bravo, former minister of foreign affairs, Spain
- 10 July 1970: María del Carmen Cotoner y Cotoner, Duke of Amalfi, Spain
- 10 July 1970: Gabriel Fernandez de Valderrama Moreno, former diplomat, Spain
- 10 August 1970: Mário Gibson Barbosa, former minister of foreign affairs, Brazil
- 16 September 1970: Édouard Bonnefous, former Minister of Commerce, France
- 26 February 1971: Pedro Calmon, former Minister of Education, Brazil
- 2 March 1971: Jarbas Passarinho, former Minister of Education, Brazil
- 2 March 1971: Israel Pinheiro, former governor of Minas Gerais, Brazil
- 2 March 1971: Alacid Nunes, former governor of Pará, Brazil
- 6 March 1971: Morinosuke Kajima, former senator, Japan
- 31 May 1971: Petko Iliev, former diplomat, Bulgaria
- 20 August 1971: Sadi J. Kavur, former ambassador of Turkey
- 9 September 1971: Gonzalo Facio Segreda, former minister of foreign affairs, Costa Rica
- 19 January 1972: Nicolas Perazzo, former ambassador of Venezuela
- 15 March 1972: Henry Hopkinson, 1st Baron Colyton, former diplomat, United Kingdom
- 11 April 1972: Ernesto Torres Diaz, former ambassador of Colombia
- 11 April 1972: Phairot Jayanam, former ambassador of Thailand
- 11 April 1972: Lucio Pabón, former Minister of National Defence, Colombia
- 21 May 1972: Humberto Sousa Medeiros, former Archbishop of Boston, United Kingdom
- 25 July 1972: Petrônio Portella, former president of Senate, Brazil
- 25 July 1972: Ernesto Pereira Lopes, former president of Chamber of Deputies, Brazil
- 25 July 1972: Aliomar Baleeiro, former president of Federal Supreme Court, Brazil
- 25 July 1972: Erasmo Martins Pedro, former Federal Deputy, Brazil
- 25 July 1972: Menandro Minahim, former deputy governor of Bahia, Brazil
- 25 July 1972: Egberto da Silva Mafra, former diplomat, Brazil
- 25 July 1972: Jorge D’Escragnolle Taunay, former diplomat, Brazil
- 25 July 1972: Alarico da Silveira Junior, former diplomat, Brazil
- 31 July 1972: António José Rodrigues Filho, former diplomat, Brazil
- 28 August 1972: Duca Gerrit Eduard Middelburg, former ambassador of Netherlands
- 7 November 1972: Caio Flávio Prates da Silveira, former Chief of Staff, Federal District, Brazil
- 7 November 1972: Pedro de Magalhães Padilha, former diplomat, Brazil
- 19 December 1972: Alejandro Gallinal Heber, former ambassador of Uruguay
- 19 December 1972: Wladimir Murtinho, former diplomat, Brazil
- 8 March 1973: Orlando Geisel, former minister of army, Brazil
- 28 March 1973: Jose Luis Cardona Cooper, former ambassador of Costa Rica
- 28 March 1973: José António Giminez Arnan, former ambassador of Spain
- 28 March 1973: Roman Ortega, former ambassador of Costa Rica
- 11 April 1973: Carlos Borda Mendonza, former ambassador of Colombia
- 25 April 1973: Pierre Emile Debillote, former diplomat, France
- 26 July 1973: André Teixeira de Mesquita, former diplomat, Brazil
- 26 July 1973: Carlos Alberto da Fontoura, former ambassador of Brazil
- 26 September 1973: Hugo Biermann, former Chief of Defence Staff, South Africa
- 26 September 1973: Werndly van der Riet, former Chief of Defence Staff, South Africa
- 16 November 1973: Emilio Calderon Puig, former ambassador of Mexico
- 2 December 1973: Hildegard Muller, former diplomat, South Africa
- 14 January 1974: Alfonso de la Serna, former diplomat, Spain
- 14 January 1974: Manuel Alabart, former ambassador of Spain
- 12 February 1974: Jaime Alba Delibes, former diplomat, Spain
- 15 April 1974: Eduardo de Guzmán, former diplomat, Spain
- 23 April 1974: Pablo M. del Pino, former Consul, Argentina
- 23 April 1974: Licinio de la Fuente, former Minister of Labour, Spain
- 11 July 1974: Antonio Martín Araujo, former Minister, Venezuela
- 12 February 1975: Shusaku Wada, former ambassador of Japan
- 28 February 1975: Abdou Diouf, former president of Senegal (then Prime Minister)
- 28 February 1975: Assane Seck, former minister of foreign affairs, Senegal
- 28 February 1975: Ousmane Camara, former Minister of Information, Senegal
- 28 February 1975: Henri Arphang Senghor, former ambassador of Senegal
- 17 April 1975: Ehrenfried von Holleben, former ambassador of Germany
- 17 April 1975: Ramon Martin Herrero, former ambassador of Spain
- 16 May 1975: Karl Fredrik Almqvist, former diplomat, Sweden
- 16 May 1975: Gunnar Dryselius, former ambassador of Sweden
- 28 May 1975: Kenneth Kaunda, former president of Zambia
- 21 October 1975: Maurice Couve de Murville, former prime minister of France
- 21 October 1975: Yvon Bourges, former minister of defence, France
- 21 October 1975: Jean Sauvagnargues, former minister of foreign affairs, France
- 21 October 1975: Michel Poniatowski, former minister of interior, France
- 21 October 1975: Norbert Ségard, former minister of foreign trade, France
- 21 October 1975: Paul Dijoud, former diplomat, France (later Minister of State, France)
- 21 October 1975: Manea Mănescu, former prime minister of Romania
- 21 October 1975: Ștefan Voitec, former president of Great National Assembly, Romania
- 21 October 1975: Vasile Vâlcu, former vice president of State Council, Romania
- 21 October 1975: Gheorghe Oprea, former deputy prime minister, Romania
- 21 October 1975: George Macovescu, former minister of foreign affairs, Romania
- 21 October 1975: Ștefan Andrei, former minister of foreign affairs, Romania
- 21 October 1975: Emil Bobu, former minister of interior, Romania
- 21 October 1975: Gheorghe Cioară, former Minister of Electricity, Romania
- 21 October 1975: Angelo Miculescu, former minister of agriculture, Romania
- 21 October 1975: Constantin Stătescu, former Minister of Justice
- 21 October 1975: Ion Cosma, former Minister of Tourism, Romania
- 21 October 1975: Ioan Ioniță, former minister of armed forces, Romania
- 21 October 1975: Ioan Ursu, former Minister, Romania
- 21 October 1975: Nicolae M. Nicolae, former diplomat, Romania
- 21 October 1975: Ion Patan, former diplomat, Romania
- 21 October 1975: Marin Iliescu, former ambassador of Romania
- 21 October 1975: Aurel Duma, former diplomat, Romania
- 21 October 1975: Teodor Coman, former diplomat, Romania
- 22 October 1975: Ioan Avram, former diplomat, Romania
- 1 July 1976: Masuo Yanagi, former chairman, Mitsui Bank, Japan
- 10 July 1976: Wojciech Jaruzelski, former president of Poland
- 10 July 1976: Edward Babiuch, former prime minister of Poland
- 10 July 1976: Józef Tejchma, former deputy prime minister, Poland
- 10 July 1976: Józef Kępa, former deputy prime minister, Poland
- 10 July 1976: Mieczysław Jagielski, former deputy prime minister, Poland
- 10 July 1976: Stefan Olszowski, former minister of foreign affairs, Poland
- 10 July 1976: Ryszard Frelek, former Member of Sejm, Poland
- 28 July 1976: Nikola Ljubičić, former president of Serbia, Yugoslavia
- 28 July 1976: Dragoslav Marković, former president of Serbia, Yugoslavia
- 28 July 1976: Raif Dizdarević, former president of Presidency, Yugoslavia
- 28 July 1976: Džemal Bijedić, former president of Federal Executive Council, Yugoslavia
- 28 July 1976: Kiro Gligorov, former president of Federal Assembly, Yugoslavia
- 28 July 1976: Živan Vasiljević, former president of People's Assembly, Serbia, Yugoslavia
- 28 July 1976: Vladimir Bakarić, former Member of Presidency, Yugoslavia
- 28 July 1976: Miloš Minić, former minister of foreign affairs, Yugoslavia
- 28 July 1976: Emil Ludviger, former Member of Executive Council, Yugoslavia
- 28 July 1976: Jakov Blažević, former president of Executive Council, Croatia, Yugoslavia
- 28 July 1976: Živorad Kovačević, former diplomat, Yugoslavia
- 28 July 1976: Petar Zečević, former diplomat, Yugoslavia
- 28 July 1976: Mirko Milutinović, former diplomat, Yugoslavia
- 28 July 1976: Milan Stojakovic, former ambassador of Yugoslavia
- 28 July 1976: Peko Dapčević, former Chief of Staff, Yugoslavia
- 11 August 1976: Trpe Jakovlevski, former diplomat, Yugoslavia
- 22 September 1976: Adolf Bredo Stabell, former ambassador of Norway
- 6 December 1976: Bernard Durand, former Counsellor, France
- 17 March 1977: Joaquim Bernal, former ambassador of Mexico
- 20 May 1977: Nobuo Okuchi, former ambassador of Japan
- 20 May 1977: Roberto Assumpção, former ambassador of Brazil
- 20 May 1977: Erich Butzke, former ambassador of East Germany
- 5 July 1977: Nenko Draganov Tchendov, former ambassador of Bulgaria
- 7 July 1977: Gumersindo Rodríguez, former Minister of Power, Venezuela
- 7 July 1977: Reinaldo Figueredo Planchart, former Minister, Venezuela
- 7 July 1977: Guido Grooscors, former minister of interior, Venezuela
- 7 July 1977: Jorge Gomez Mantellini, former governor of Caracas, Venezuela
- 7 July 1977: German Nava Carrillo, former diplomat, Venezuela
- 7 July 1977: Román Valencia, former diplomat, Venezuela
- 7 July 1977: Jesus A. Ponce, former diplomat, Venezuela
- 7 July 1977: Gonzalo Plata, former diplomat, Venezuela
- 7 July 1977: Francisco Armando Guedez, former diplomat, Venezuela
- 7 July 1977: Ney Pulgar, former diplomat, Venezuela
- 1 September 1977: Francisco Astray Rodriguez, former ambassador of Cuba
- 20 December 1977: Ramiro Saraiva Guerreiro, former minister of foreign affairs, Brazil
- 20 December 1977: Célio Borja, former Minister of Justice, Brazil
- 20 December 1977: João Paulo dos Reis Veloso, former Minister of Planning, Brazil
- 20 December 1977: Azeredo da Silveira, former minister of foreign affairs, Brazil
- 20 December 1977: Roberto Santos, former Minister of Health, Brazil
- 20 December 1977: Djaci Falcão, former Judge of Federal Supreme Court, Brazil
- 20 December 1977: Floriano Peixoto Faria Lima, former governor of Rio de Janeiro, Brazil
- 20 December 1977: Paulo Egydio Martins, former governor of São Paulo, Brazil
- 20 December 1977: Elmo Serejo Farias, former governor of Federal District, Brazil
- 20 December 1977: Dário Moreira de Castro Alves, former ambassador of Brazil
- 20 December 1977: Ítalo Zappa, former diplomat, Brazil
- 20 December 1977: Armindo Branco Mendes Cadaxa, former diplomat, Brazil
- 20 December 1977: João Paulo da Silva Paranhos do Rio Branco, former diplomat, Brazil
- 20 December 1977: Francisco de Assis Grieco, former diplomat, Brazil
- 20 December 1977: Luiz Augusto Pereira Souto Maior, former diplomat, Brazil
- 20 December 1977: Paulo Cabral de Mello, former diplomat, Brazil
- 3 March 1978: Amir Shilaty, former ambassador of Iran
- 20 April 1978: Andrés Reguera, former Minister of Information, Spain
- 20 April 1978: Carlos Gámir Prieto, former diplomat, Spain
- 20 April 1978: Miguel Solano Aza, former diplomat, Spain
- 20 April 1978: Antonio Elías Martinena, former diplomat, Spain
- 20 April 1978: Pablo de Churruca y de la Plaza, Marqués de San Felices, Spain
- 5 May 1978: Janko Smole, former Minister of Finance, Yugoslavia
- 5 May 1978: Anton Lah, former diplomat, Yugoslavia
- 19 May 1978: Hans-Jürgen Wischnewski, former Minister of Economic Cooperation, Germany
- 19 May 1978: Manfred Schüler, former Head of Chancellery, Germany
- 19 May 1978: Josef Ertl, former minister of agriculture, Germany
- 19 May 1978: Henning Schwarz, former Minister-President of Schleswig-Holstein, Germany
- 19 May 1978: Günter Flessner, former minister of agriculture, Schleswig-Holstein, Germany
- 19 May 1978: Günther van Well, former Secretary of State, Germany
- 19 May 1978: Peter Hermes, former diplomat, Germany
- 19 May 1978: Frank Paul, former diplomat, Germany
- 19 May 1978: Fritz Caspari, former diplomat, Germany
- 19 May 1978: Klaus Bölling, former Government Spokesperson, Germany
- 30 August 1978: Fernando Rodríguez-Porrero y de Chávarri, former ambassador of Spain
- 30 August 1978: Ingvald Smith-Kielland, former Court Marshal, Norway
- 30 August 1978: Georg Kristiansen, former diplomat, Norway
- 30 August 1978: Leif Edwardsen, former ambassador of Norway
- 30 August 1978: Tore Bøgh, former ambassador of Norway
- 30 August 1978: Paul Owren, former Royal Physician, Norway
- 7 September 1978: Árpád Szenes, Hungarian painter
- 28 December 1978: João Figueiredo, former president of Brazil
- 28 December 1978: Luís Gonzaga do Nascimento e Silva, former Minister of Labour, Brazil
- 28 December 1978: Golbery do Couto e Silva, former Chief of Staff of Presidency, Brazil
- 28 December 1978: Joelmir Campos de Araripe Macedo, former minister of air force, Brazil
- 28 December 1978: Geraldo Azevedo Henning, former Minister of Navy, Brazil
- 28 December 1978: Eduardo Moreira Hosannah, former ambassador of Brazil
- 5 January 1979: Hernando Currea Cubides, former minister of defence, Colombia
- 18 April 1979: Américo Ghioldi, former ambassador of Argentina
- 18 May 1979: John Wilson, 2nd Baron Moran, former ambassador of United Kingdom
- 31 May 1979: Frigyes Puja, former minister of foreign affairs, Hungary
- 31 May 1979: Ferenc Simon, former diplomat, Hungary
- 31 May 1979: János Nagy, former diplomat, Hungary
- 31 May 1979: József Birë, former diplomat, Hungary
- 31 May 1979: Ferenc Csaba, former diplomat, Hungary
- 31 May 1979: Lyudmila Zhivkova, former politician, Bulgaria
- 31 May 1979: Petar Mladenov, former president of Bulgaria
- 31 May 1979: Grisha Filipov, former prime minister of Bulgaria
- 31 May 1979: Andrey Lukanov, former prime minister of Bulgaria
- 31 May 1979: Peko Takov, former deputy chairman, State Council, Bulgaria
- 31 May 1979: Nikolay Manolov, former diplomat, Bulgaria
- 31 May 1979: Groudi Jelev, former diplomat, Bulgaria
- 31 May 1979: Grigor Stoytchkov, former diplomat, Bulgaria
- 31 May 1979: Ilia Kachev, former diplomat, Bulgaria
- 31 May 1979: Ognyan Donev, former diplomat, Bulgaria
- 31 May 1979: Boris Tsvetkov, former diplomat, Bulgaria
- 31 May 1979: Dimitar Traykov, former ambassador of Bulgaria
- 31 May 1979: Christo Christov, Bulgarian film personality
- 30 June 1979: Jorge Del Campo Vidal, former ambassador of Peru
- 13 July 1979: Géraud Michel de Pierredon, former diplomat, France
- 28 July 1979: Luis Rodríguez, former ambassador of Venezuela
- 14 August 1979: Fortune FitzRoy, Duchess of Grafton, former Mistress of Robes, United Kingdom
- 14 August 1979: Philip Moore, Baron Moore of Wolvercote, former Private Secretary to Queen, United Kingdom
- 1 September 1979: Kevin Rush, former ambassador of Ireland
- 3 September 1979: Wojciech Chabasiński, former ambassador of Poland
- 14 September 1979: Charles Delgado, former ambassador of Senegal
- 13 October 1979: Pierluigi Alverá, former ambassador of Italy
- 15 October 1979: Angelo Felici, President Emeritus, Pontifical Commission Ecclesia Dei
- 9 January 1980: Hassan Ali, former Minister of Economy, Iran
- 30 June 1980: J. L. R. Huydecoper van Nigtevecht, former ambassador of Netherlands
- 30 June 1980: Joseph Missanda, former ambassador of Gabon
- 5 August 1980: Tómas Þorvaldsson, Icelandic fishing industry leader
- 5 August 1980: Þórhallur Ásgeirsson, former diplomat, Iceland
- 19 November 1980: Gianni De Michelis, former deputy prime minister, Italy
- 19 November 1980: Giuseppe Zamberletti, former Minister of Civil Protection, Italy
- 19 November 1980: Piergiorgio Bressani, former Secretary, Council of Ministers, Italy
- 19 November 1980: Francesco Malfatti di Montetretto, former secretary-general, Foreign Ministry, Italy
- 19 November 1980: Cesidio Guazzaroni, former European Commissioner
- 19 November 1980: Walter Gardini, former diplomat, Italy
- 19 November 1980: Maurizio Bucci, former diplomat, Italy
- 19 November 1980: Carlo Calenda, former diplomat, Italy
- 19 November 1980: Mário Magliano, former ambassador of Italy
- 26 November 1980: Moriki Tani, former ambassador of Japan
- 26 November 1980: Michel Mouzas, former ambassador of Greece
- 5 December 1980: Johan Jørgen Holst, former minister of foreign affairs, Norway
- 5 December 1980: Knut Frydenlund, former minister of foreign affairs, Norway
- 5 December 1980: Odd Grønvold, former Grand Chamberlain, Norway
- 5 December 1980: Magne Hagen, former private secretary to king, Norway
- 5 December 1980: Eivinn Berg, former state secretary, Foreign Ministry, Norway
- 5 December 1980: Sverre B. Hamre, former chief of defence, Norway
- 5 December 1980: Kjell Bjørge-Hansen, former chief of armed forces, Norway
- 5 December 1980: Kjell Rasmussen, former diplomat, Norway
- 23 December 1980: Jesco von Puttkamer, former ambassador of Germany
- 19 January 1981: Louis A. Lerner, former diplomat, United States
- 19 January 1981: Dimitar Traykov, former ambassador of Bulgaria
- 23 January 1981: Virginio Rognoni, former minister of defence, Italy
- 23 January 1981: Antonio Maccanico, former minister of regional affairs, Italy
- 23 January 1981: Lelio Lagorio, former minister of defence, Italy
- 23 January 1981: Arnaldo Esquillante, former diplomat, Italy
- 28 January 1981: Chung Tai Kim, former ambassador of South Korea
- 7 August 1981: Ahmed Abdul Mabi Macki, former minister of national economy, Oman
- 7 August 1981: Karel Coeckx, former ambassador of Belgium
- 7 August 1981: Corsino Fortes, former ambassador of Cape Verde
- 7 August 1981: Mariano Tirado, former ambassador of Venezuela
- 7 August 1981: Robert Six, former ambassador of Belgium
- 22 September 1981: Dulce Figueiredo, former first lady of Brazil
- 22 September 1981: Jorge Carlos Ribeiro, former diplomat, Brazil
- 22 September 1981: João Carlos Pessoa Fragoso, former diplomat, Brazil
- 22 September 1981: Orlando Soares Carbonar, former diplomat, Brazil
- 22 September 1981: Ivan Velloso da Silveira Batalha, former diplomat, Brazil
- 22 September 1981: Adolpho Corrêa de Sá e Benevides, former diplomat, Brazil
- 19 October 1981: Raniero Vanni d'Archirafi, former diplomat, Italy
- 22 October 1981: Dimitris Heraclides, former ambassador of Greece
- 26 October 1981: Benkaram Mohammed Darweefsh, former ambassador of Greece
- 28 October 1981: Petros Molyviatis, former minister of foreign affairs, Greece
- 28 October 1981: Adamantios Vacalopoulos, former diplomat, Greece
- 28 October 1981: Alexandre Raphael, former diplomat, Greece
- 28 October 1981: Emmanuel Spyridakis, former ambassador of Greece
- 28 October 1981: Aristotelis Frydas, former diplomat, Greece
- 11 November 1981: Délio Jardim de Matos, former minister of aeronautics, Brazil
- 25 November 1981: Juan José Rosón, former minister of interior, Spain
- 27 April 1982: Gaston Thorn, former prime minister of Luxembourg
- 26 June 1982: Jean-François de Liedekerke, former ambassador of Belgium
- 26 June 1982: Alfred Cahen, former diplomat, Belgium
- 16 August 1982: Hocine Djoudi, former ambassador of Algeria
- 7 September 1982: Paulo Maluf, former governor of São Paulo, Brazil
- 15 November 1982: Ahmed Maher El Sayed, former ambassador of Egypt
- 10 December 1982: Jean-Luc Dehaene, former prime minister of Belgium
- 10 December 1982: Philippe Maystadt, former deputy prime minister, Belgium
- 10 December 1982: Alfred Vreven, former minister of defence, Belgium
- 10 December 1982: Albert Debeche, former Chief of Defence, Belgium
- 10 December 1982: Luc Putman, former secretary-general, Foreign Ministry, Belgium
- 10 December 1982: José Charlier, former diplomat, Belgium
- 10 December 1982: Joseph Trouveroy, former diplomat, Belgium
- 10 December 1982: Willy Tielemans, former diplomat, Belgium
- 10 December 1982: Prosper Thuysbaert, former diplomat, Belgium
- 10 December 1982: Gilbert Declercq, Belgian artist
- 5 May 1983: Kálmán Ábrahám, former Minister of Urban Development, Hungary
- 5 May 1983: Károly Szarka, former deputy foreign minister, Hungary
- 5 May 1983: Tibor Melega, former deputy trade minister, Hungary
- 5 May 1983: Zsolt Bajnok, former diplomat, Hungary
- 5 May 1983: László Rosta, former diplomat, Hungary
- 5 May 1983: Ede Gazdik, former ambassador of Hungary
- 5 May 1983: Ferenc Farago, former diplomat, Hungary
- 16 May 1983: Bailio Fra'Hubert Pallavicini, Italian noble
- 18 May 1983: Maximiano Eduardo da Silva Fonseca, former Minister of Navy, Brazil
- 30 July 1983: Yutaka Tamura, former ambassador of Japan
- 16 August 1983: Jean-Marie Piret, former Principal Private Secretary to King, Belgium
- 16 August 1983: Guiseppe Arturo Nigra, former ambassador of Italy
- 16 August 1983: Giacomo Profili, former ambassador of Italy
- 19 August 1983: Boutros Boutros-Ghali, former secretary-general, United Nations
- 19 August 1983: Saied Abdel Kader Hamza, former diplomat, Egypt
- 19 August 1983: Gamal Mansour, former diplomat, Egypt
- 19 August 1983: Mohamed El-Sayed El, former diplomat, Egypt
- 19 August 1983: Mahmond Amin Fathi, former diplomat, Egypt
- 19 August 1983: Mokhless Gobba, former diplomat, Egypt
- 19 August 1983: Mohamed Abdel Hamid Raduan, former diplomat, Egypt
- 19 August 1983: Yehia Refaat, former diplomat, Egypt
- 22 August 1983: Karolos Papoulias, former president of Greece (then Minister)
- 22 August 1983: Menios Koutsogiorgas, former minister of interior, Greece
- 22 August 1983: Pausanias Zakolikos, former deputy minister of national defence, Greece
- 22 August 1983: Yannis Kapsis, former deputy minister of foreign affairs, Greece
- 22 August 1983: Grigoris Varfis, former president of Council, European Union
- 22 August 1983: Georges Sekeris, former ambassador of Greece
- 22 August 1983: Nikolaos Katapodis, former diplomat, Greece
- 22 August 1983: Dimitrios Maroudas, former diplomat, Greece
- 22 August 1983: Dimitris Papaioannon, former diplomat, Greece
- 2 September 1983: Andrzej Maria Deskur, former president, Pontifical Academy of Immaculate Conception
- 2 September 1983: Paul Marcinkus, Pro-President Emeritus, Pontifical Commission
- 2 September 1983: Lucas Moreira Neves, former Prefect, Congregation for Bishops
- 5 November 1983: Richard L. Lawson, former deputy chief, U.S. Europe Command
- 6 January 1984: Julián Campo, former minister of public works, Spain
- 6 January 1984: Carlos Romero, former minister of agriculture, Food, Spain
- 6 January 1984: Miguel Boyer, former Minister of Economy, Commerce, Spain
- 6 January 1984: Ramón Fernandez de Soignie, former ambassador of Spain
- 6 January 1984: Luis de Velasco Rami, former Secretary of State, Commerce, Spain
- 6 January 1984: Eduardo Sotillos, former Government Spokesperson, Spain
- 6 January 1984: Manuel Marín, former president of Chamber of Deputies, Spain
- 17 January 1984: Pentti Talvitie, former ambassador of Finland
- 17 January 1984: Tómas A. Tómasson, former ambassador, Iceland
- 17 January 1984: Ingvi Sigurður Ingvarsson, former diplomat, Iceland
- 17 January 1984: Einar Benediktsson, former ambassador, Iceland
- 19 January 1984: Pedro Pablo Aguilar, former politician, Venezuela
- 18 April 1984: Herma Kirchschläger, former first lady of Austria
- 18 April 1984: Leopold Gratz, former president of National Council, Austria
- 18 April 1984: Rudolf Thalhammer, former Third President of National Council, Austria
- 18 April 1984: Peter Jankowitsch, former minister of foreign affairs, Austria
- 18 April 1984: Wilfried Haslauer, former governor of Salzburg, Austria
- 18 April 1984: Gerald Hinteregger, former secretary-general, Foreign Ministry, Austria
- 18 April 1984: Wolfgang Loibl, former Head of Presidential Chancellery, Austria
- 18 April 1984: Erich Hochleitner, former ambassador of Austria
- 18 April 1984: Hans Nigisch, former diplomat, Austria
- 18 April 1984: Kurt Zeleny, former diplomat, Austria
- 18 April 1984: Robert Danzinger, former Director-General of Public Safety, Austria
- 14 May 1984: Joaquim Chissano, former president of Mozambique
- 4 July 1984: Joseph Luns, former secretary-general, NATO
- 4 July 1984: Sinclair L. Melner, former deputy chair, NATO Military Committee
- 4 July 1984: Alfredo Karam, former Minister of Navy, Brazil
- 4 July 1984: Lee Chong Chin, former ambassador of North Korea
- 4 July 1984: Geoffrey Vincent Brady, former ambassador of Australia
- 30 July 1984: André Corsino Tolentino, former ambassador of Cape Verde
- 3 August 1984: Carmela Aguilar Ayanz, former ambassador of Peru
- 13 August 1984: Napoleon Gimenez, former ambassador of Venezuela
- 29 August 1984: Emiel van Lennep, former secretary-general, OECD
- 22 September 1984: Narcís Serra, former deputy prime minister, Spain
- 25 September 1984: Peter Udoh, former ambassador of Nigeria
- 16 November 1984: Lars-Erik Thunholm, former CEO, Skandinaviska Enskilda Banken
- 16 November 1984: Hans Sølvhøj, former Court Marshal, Denmark
- 16 November 1984: Uffe Ellemann-Jensen, former minister of foreign affairs, Denmark
- 16 November 1984: Per Fergo, former ambassador of Denmark
- 24 November 1984: Ferdinand Lacina, former Minister of Finance, Austria
- 24 November 1984: Antoinette Sassou Nguesso, First Lady of Republic of the Congo
- 12 December 1984: Hans-Dietrich Genscher, former Vice-Chancellor of Germany
- 12 December 1984: Léon Kengo wa Dondo, former prime minister of Zaire
- 12 December 1984: Mpinga Kasenda, former prime minister of Zaire
- 12 December 1984: Nyiwa Mobutu, former Minister, Zaire
- 12 December 1984: Nzondomyo Adokpe Lingo, former president of National Assembly, Zaire
- 12 December 1984: Umba-di Lutete, former minister of foreign affairs, Zaire
- 12 December 1984: Victor Nendaka Bika, former Minister of Finance, Zaire
- 12 December 1984: Seti Yale, former Advisor to President, Zaire
- 12 December 1984: Mosambaye Singa Boyenge, former Chief of Armed Forces, Zaire
- 12 December 1984: Bangala Oto-Wa-Ngama, former governor of Kinshasa
- 12 December 1984: Bonsange, former diplomat, Zaire
- 12 December 1984: Lengema Dulia, former diplomat, Zaire
- 12 December 1984: Bomele Molinco Ikaki, former diplomat, Zaire
- 12 December 1984: Lema Mvunda, former diplomat, Zaire
- 12 December 1984: Bulambo, former ambassador of Zaire
- 12 December 1984: Pay-Paywa Saykasige, former ambassador of Zaire
- 29 January 1985: Marcel Houllez, former ambassador of Belgium
- 29 January 1985: Christian Calmes, former Grand Marshal, Luxembourg
- 29 January 1985: Jacques Poos, former deputy prime minister, Luxembourg
- 29 January 1985: Léopold Quarles van Ufford, former ambassador of Luxembourg
- 13 March 1985: Enrique Quintana, former ambassador of Argentina
- 13 March 1985: Silvino Manuel da Luz, former Minister of Foreign Minister, Cape Verde
- 26 April 1985: Cardinal Agostino Casaroli, former Secretary of State, Holy See
- 26 April 1985: Siddhi Savetsila, former deputy prime minister, Thailand
- 9 July 1985: Toshikuni Yahiro, former chairman, Mitsui & Co.
- 19 August 1985: Hassan Solaiman Abu Basha, former diplomat, Egypt
- 5 September 1985: Kim Ki-Soo, former ambassador of South Korea
- 5 September 1985: Willt Patocchi, former ambassador of Uruguay
- 5 September 1985: Werner Schattmann, former ambassador of Germany
- 5 September 1985: Carlos Luis Pedroso, former ambassador of Spain
- 5 September 1985: Manuel Fonseca Veloso, former ambassador of São Tomé and Príncipe
- 12 November 1985: Robert Urbain, Minister of State, Belgium
- 12 November 1985: Walter Moreira Salles, former Minister of Finance, Brazil
- 31 January 1986: Arturo Uslar Pietri, former Minister of Finance, Venezuela
- 25 February 1986: Lorenzo Natali, former European Commissioner for International Cooperation
- 18 July 1986: Bernardo Sepúlveda Amor, former Vice President, International Court of Justice
- 14 July 1986: Luís Viana Filho, former president of Federal Senate, Brazil
- 14 July 1986: Rubens Ricupero, former secretary-general, UNCTAD
- 14 July 1986: Paulo Cardoso de Oliveira Pires do Rio, former diplomat, Brazil
- 14 July 1986: Carlos Eduardo Fonseca Alves, former diplomat, Brazil
- 14 July 1986: Joshua Montello, former diplomat, Brazil
- 14 July 1986: João Tabajara de Oliveira, former diplomat, Brazil
- 14 July 1986: Paulo Tarso Flecha de Lima, former ambassador of Brazil
- 12 December 1986: Bokota w' Ekila, Zaire
- 13 January 1987: Nils-Eric Svensson, Swedish sports administrator
- 13 January 1987: Alice Trolle-Wachtmeister, former Chief Court Mistress, Sweden
- 13 January 1987: Lennart Ahrén, former Marshal of Royal Court, Sweden
- 13 January 1987: Sten Andersson, former minister of foreign affairs, Sweden
- 13 January 1987: Jan Eliasson, former minister of foreign affairs, Sweden
- 13 January 1987: Göran Hasselmark, diplomat, Sweden
- 13 January 1987: Sven Fredrik Hedin, former ambassador of Sweden
- 21 January 1987: Blanca Ibáñez, former first lady of Venezuela
- 21 January 1987: Oswaldo Álvarez Paz, former president of Chamber of Deputies, Venezuela
- 21 January 1987: Carmelo Lauría Lesseur, former president of Chamber of Deputies, Venezuela
- 21 January 1987: Freddy Augusto Gonzalez Echenagucia, former secretary-general to President, Venezuela
- 21 January 1987: Moritz Eiris Villegas, former ambassador of Venezuela
- 21 January 1987: Ruben Carpio Castillo, Venezuelan author
- 21 January 1987: Horacio Arteaga, Venezuela
- 21 January 1987: Rafael José Neri, former Rector, UCV, Venezuela
- 21 January 1987: Pedro Sorensen, former ambassador of Venezuela
- 28 October 1987: Danielle Mitterrand, former first lady of France
- 31 October 1987: Poul Schlüter, former prime minister of Denmark
- 31 October 1987: Niels Christian Ersbøll, former secretary-general, Council of Europe
- 31 October 1987: Laurent Fabius, former prime minister of France
- 31 October 1987: Bettino Craxi, former prime minister of Italy
- 31 October 1987: Frans Andriessen, former European Commissioner
- 31 October 1987: Garret FitzGerald, former Taoiseach of Ireland
- 31 October 1987: Jacques Delors, former president of European Commission
- 31 October 1987: Étienne Davignon, former Vice-President, European Commission
- 31 October 1987: Émile Noël, former president, European University Institute
- 31 October 1987: Wilfried Martens, former prime minister of Belgium
- 31 October 1987: Ruud Lubbers, former prime minister of Netherlands
- 26 November 1987: Aureliano Chaves, former Vice President of Brazil
- 26 November 1987: Marco Maciel, former Vice President of Brazil
- 26 November 1987: Humberto Lucena, former president of Senate, Brazil
- 26 November 1987: Ulysses Guimarães, former president of Chamber of Deputies, Brazil
- 26 November 1987: Luís Rafael Mayer, former president of Supreme Court, Brazil
- 26 November 1987: Abreu Sodré, former minister of foreign affairs, Brazil
- 26 November 1987: Dilson Funaro, former Minister of Finance, Brazil
- 26 November 1987: Waldir Pires, former minister of defence, Brazil
- 26 November 1987: Renato Archer, former Minister of Science and Technology, Brazil
- 26 November 1987: José Aparecido de Oliveira, former minister of culture, Brazil
- 26 November 1987: José Hugo Castelo Branco, former minister of industry, Brazil
- 26 November 1987: Ronaldo Costa Couto, former secretary-general to president, Brazil
- 26 November 1987: Epitácio Cafeteira, former governor of Maranhão, Brazil
- 26 November 1987: Miguel Arraes, former governor of Pernambuco, Brazil
- 26 November 1987: Jorge Bornhausen, former governor of Santa Catarina, Brazil
- 26 November 1987: Orestes Quércia, former governor of São Paulo, Brazil
- 26 November 1987: Moreira Franco, former governor of Rio De Janeiro, Brazil
- 26 November 1987: José Augusto Olympio Rocha de Almeida, former ambassador of Brazil
- 26 November 1987: Fernando Abbott Galvão, former diplomat, Brazil
- 26 November 1987: José Nogueira Filho, former diplomat, Brazil
- 26 November 1987: Adolpho Bloch, Brazilian television personality
- 26 November 1987: Valentim Diniz, Brazilian businessman
- 26 November 1987: Roberto Marinho, Brazilian businessman
- 5 December 1987: Torbjørn Kristoffer Christiansen, former diplomat, Norway
- 25 January 1988: Hernani do Amaral Peixoto, former diplomat, Brazil
- 5 July 1988: Giuliano Vassalli, former president of Constitutional Court, Italy
- 25 August 1988: Funiya Okada, former ambassador of Japan
- 13 October 1988: Queen Sofía of Spain
- 13 October 1988: Infanta Margarita, Duchess of Soria
- 13 October 1988: José Federico de Carvajal, former president of Senate, Spain
- 13 October 1988: Francisco Fernández Ordóñez, former minister of foreign affairs, Spain
- 13 October 1988: Félix Pons, former Minister of Territorial Administration, Spain
- 13 October 1988: José Rodríguez de la Borbolla, former president of Andalusia Government, Spain
- 13 October 1988: Jordi Pujol, former president of Catalonian Government, Spain
- 13 October 1988: Gabriel Ferrán de Alfaro, former ambassador of Spain
- 13 October 1988: Fernando Perpiña Robert, former diplomat, Spain
- 13 October 1988: Máximo Cajal López, former diplomat, Spain
- 12 November 1988: Léon Bollendorff, former president of Chamber of Deputies, Luxembourg
- 12 November 1988: Jean-Claude Juncker, former prime minister of Luxembourg
- 12 November 1988: Bernard Berg, former deputy prime minister of Luxembourg
- 12 November 1988: Marc Fischbach, former minister of defence, Luxembourg
- 12 November 1988: Robert Krieps, former minister of culture, Environment, Luxembourg
- 12 November 1988: Fernand Boden, former Minister of National Education, Luxembourg
- 12 November 1988: Jean Spautz, former minister of home affairs, Luxembourg
- 12 November 1988: Marcel Schlechter, former Minister of Transport, Luxembourg
- 18 March 1989: Moulay Slama Benzidane, former ambassador of Morocco
- 5 May 1989: Fernando Nardiz Vial, former Chief of Navy, Spain
- 2 June 1989: Marianne von Weizsäcker, former first lady of Germany
- 2 June 1989: Wolfgang Schäuble, former president of Bundestag, Germany
- 2 June 1989: Martin Bangemann, former Minister of Economics, Germany
- 2 June 1989: Irmgard Schwaetzer, former Minister of Regional Planning, Germany
- 2 June 1989: Lutz Stavenhagen, former Minister of State, Germany
- 2 June 1989: Helmut Schäfer, former Minister of State, Germany
- 2 June 1989: Lothar Späth, former Minister-President of Baden-Württemberg, Germany
- 2 June 1989: Eberhard Diepgen, former Governing Mayor of Berlin, Germany
- 2 June 1989: Klaus Blech, former Head of President's Office, Germany
- 2 June 1989: Jürgen Sudhoff, former State Secretary, Foreign Office, Germany
- 2 June 1989: Hans Werner Lautenschlager, former State Secretary, Germany
- 2 June 1989: Gisbert Poensgen, former ambassador of Germany
- 16 April 1990: Albrecht von Boeselager, former Grand Chancellor, Sovereign Military Order of Malta
- 11 May 1990: Stephen Reckert, American writer
- 12 September 1990: Diego Cordovez, former minister of foreign affairs, Ecuador
- 12 September 1990: Giulio Andreotti, former prime minister of Italy
- 12 September 1990: Valerio Zanone, former minister of defence, Italy
- 12 September 1990: Antonio Mario La Pergola, former Minister of Community Policies, Italy
- 12 September 1990: Antonio Gava, former minister of interior, Italy
- 12 September 1990: Giovanni Manzolini, former Undersecretary of State, Italy
- 12 September 1990: Andrea Manzella, former secretary-general to President, Italy
- 12 September 1990: Bruno Bottai, former secretary-general, Foreign Ministry, Italy
- 12 September 1990: Luigi Garafoli, former diplomat, Italy
- 12 September 1990: Franco Ferretti, former diplomat, Italy
- 12 September 1990: Enzo Perlot, former ambassador of Italy
- 12 September 1990: Sergio Berlinguer, former secretary-general to President, Italy
- 19 October 1990: Mário César Flores, former Minister of Navy, Brazil
- 19 October 1990: Henrique Saboia, former Minister of Navy, Brazil
- 19 October 1990: Bernardo Cabral, former Minister of Justice, Brazil
- 5 November 1990: Axel Buus, former ambassador of Denmark
- 8 November 1990: Jacques Santer, former president of European Commission
- 12 November 1990: Theodoros Pangalos, former deputy prime minister, Greece
- 12 November 1990: Dimitrios Makris, Greece
- 12 November 1990: Konstantinos Iliopoulos, former diplomat, Greece
- 12 November 1990: Georgios Mathioudakis, former diplomat, Greece
- 12 November 1990: Leonidas Papakarias, former diplomat, Greece
- 12 November 1990: Stylianos Vassilikos, former ambassador of Greece
- 12 November 1990: Costas Simitis, former prime minister of Greece
- 22 November 1990: Noboru Takeshita, former prime minister of Japan
- 23 November 1990: Andreas Meyer-Landrut, former chief of staff to president, Germany
- 12 December 1990: Bengt Rabaeus, former diplomat, Sweden
- 21 December 1990: Oscar Rizzato, Archbishop, Vatican City
- 21 December 1990: Pietro Canisio Van Lierde, Archbishop, Vatican City
- 21 December 1990: Domenico De Luca, Archbishop, Vatican City
- 21 December 1990: Dino Monduzzi, former Prefect, Papal Household
- 2 January 1991: Alberto da Costa e Silva, former ambassador of Brazil
- 22 January 1991: Alexander Otto, former ambassador of Austria
- 20 February 1991: Cardinal Achille Silvestrini, former Prefect, Congregation for Oriental Churches
- 27 February 1991: Gabriel Ferrán de Alfaro, former ambassador of Spain
- 15 April 1991: Luciano Koch, former ambassador of Italy
- 14 May 1991: Pieter van Vollenhoven, Netherlands
- 14 May 1991: Ruud Lubbers, former prime minister of Netherlands
- 14 May 1991: Hans van den Broek, former minister of foreign affairs, Netherlands
- 15 May 1991: Per Sköld, Marshal, Sweden
- 15 May 1991: Lennart Ljung, former Supreme Commander of Armed Forces, Sweden
- 15 May 1991: Bror Stefenson, former Chief of Defence Staff, Sweden
- 15 May 1991: Björn Eriksson, former president of Interpol
- 15 May 1991: Jan Kuylenstierna, Marshal, Sweden
- 15 May 1991: Carl Gustaf von Platen, former Chief Master of Ceremonies, Sweden
- 15 May 1991: Peter Osvald, former diplomat, Sweden
- 15 May 1991: Kerstin Asp. Johnsson, former ambassador of Sweden
- 2 July 1991: Luiz Felipe Lampreia, former minister of foreign affairs, Brazil
- 2 July 1991: Agenor de Carvalho, former Head of Security to President, Brazil
- 2 July 1991: Marcos Azambuja, former diplomat, Brazil
- 2 July 1991: Tellervo Koivisto, former first lady of Finland
- 2 July 1991: Pertti Paasio, former minister of foreign affairs, Finland
- 29 August 1991: Edgar Faure, former prime minister of France
- 9 December 1991: Jacques De Staercke, former politician, Belgium
- 9 December 1991: Jean Godeaux, former governor of National Bank, Belgium
- 3 February 1992: John Correia Afonso, Indian author
- 14 February 1992: Robert Van Overberghe, former ambassador of Belgium
- 10 June 1992: Alceu Amoroso Lima, Brazilian writer
- 10 June 1992: Macario Santiago Kastner, British musician
- 26 August 1992: Enrique Silva Cimma, former minister of foreign affairs, Chile
- 30 September 1992: Giovanni Battistini, former ambassador of Italy
- 30 September 1992: Emilio Cassinello, former ambassador of Spain
- 12 October 1992: Søren Haslund-Christensen, former Court Marshal, Denmark
- 12 October 1992: Niels Eilschou Holm, former chamberlain, Denmark
- 12 October 1992: H.P. Clausen, former Speaker of Folketing, Denmark
- 23 November 1992: Xosé Carro Otero, Spanish anthropologist
- 2 December 1992: Empress Masako of Japan
- 26 March 1993: Simone Veil, former president of European Parliament
- 26 March 1993: King Mohammed VI of Morocco
- 26 March 1993: Prince Moulay Rachid of Morocco
- 27 April 1993: David Ogilvy, 13th Earl of Airlie, former Lord Chamberlain, United Kingdom
- 27 April 1993: David Gillmoore, former Permanent Undersecretary, United Kingdom
- 27 April 1993: Robert Fellowes, former Private Secretary to Queen, United Kingdom
- 9 June 1993: Paulo Cesar Prado Ferreira da Gama, former diplomat, Brazil
- 9 June 1993: Joaquim-Francisco Coelho, former diplomat, Brazil
- 21 June 1993: Basilio Basilio I, Poland
- 9 July 1993: Gabriel Valdés, former minister of foreign affairs, Chile
- 9 July 1993: José Antonio Viera-Gallo, former president of Chamber of Deputies, Chile
- 4 October 1993: Chilel Jawara, former first lady of the Gambia
- 9 November 1993: Emilio García Gómez, Spanish historian
- 15 November 1993: Robert Van Lierop, former diplomat, United States
- 29 November 1993: Princess Lalla Meryem of Morocco
- 2 December 1993: Norihito, Prince Takamado
- 2 December 1993: Hisako, Princess Takamado
- 2 December 1993: Morihiro Hosokawa, former prime minister of Japan
- 2 December 1993: Tsutomu Hata, former prime minister of Japan
- 2 December 1993: Takako Doi, former Speaker of House of Representatives, Japan
- 2 December 1993: Bunbei Hara, former president, Asian Women's Fund
- 2 December 1993: Ryouhachi Kusaba, former diplomat, Japan
- 7 December 1993: Celso Amorim, former minister of foreign affairs, Brazil
- 11 August 1994: Georgios Iacovou, former minister of foreign affairs, Cyprus
- 11 August 1994: Andreas Gavrielides, former diplomat, Cyprus
- 30 August 1994: Ivan da Silveira Serpa, former Minister of Navy, Brazil
- 8 September 1994: Jean-Michel Wilmotte, French architect
- 27 October 1994: Loïc Bouvard, former Member of National Assembly, France
- 9 November 1994: Eddie Fenech Adami, former president of Malta
- 14 November 1994: Wilfred de Souza, former Chief Minister of Goa, India
- 14 November 1994: Bruce Millan, former European Commissioner for Regional Policy
- 14 November 1994: Earl A. Powell III, former chairman, U.S. Commission of Fine Arts
- 29 November 1994: Efraín Goldenberg, former prime minister of Peru
- 20 December 1994: José Joaquín Puig de la Bellacasa, former secretary-general of Royal Household, Spain
- 3 March 1995: Pieter Andries Swanepoel, former ambassador of South Africa
- 30 March 1995: Stanley Ho, Founder Chairman of SJM Holdings
- 11 April 1995: Aldo Ajello, former diplomat, Italy
- 26 June 1995: Esperança Machavela, former Minister of Justice, Mozambique
- 25 July 1995: Federico Mayor Zaragoza, former Director-General, UNESCO
- 26 July 1995: Ruy Mingas, former ambassador of Angola
- 2 October 1995: Zine El Abidine Ben Ali, former president of Tunisia
- 4 October 1995: Júlio César Gomes dos Santos, former Federal Deputy, Brazil
- 4 October 1995: Bernardo Cabral, former Minister of Justice, Brazil
- 4 October 1995: Artur da Távola, former Federal Deputy, Brazil
- 4 October 1995: Roseana Sarney, former governor of Maranhão, Brazil
- 4 October 1995: Sérgio Amaral, former Minister of Development, Trade, Brazil
- 9 November 1995: Pratapsingh Rane, former Chief Minister of Goa, India
- 9 January 1996: Alioune Blondin Béye, former minister of foreign affairs, Mali
- 16 January 1996: Venâncio da Silva Moura, former Minister of External Relations, Angola
- 16 January 1996: Wu Tao, former diplomat, China
- 22 February 1996: José María Vargas-Zúñiga Ledesma, Spain
- 22 February 1996: Enrique Fuentes Quintana, former deputy prime minister, Spain
- 22 February 1996: Fernando Lázaro Carreter, Spanish journalist
- 22 February 1996: José Ángel Sánchez Asiaín, Spanish economist
- 22 February 1996: Miguel Artola Gallego, Spanish historian
- 7 May 1996: Marcolino Moco, former prime minister of Angola
- 20 May 1996: Michel-Akis Papageorgiou, former ambassador of Greece
- 3 June 1996: Guilherme Posser da Costa, former prime minister of São Tomé and Príncipe
- 17 June 1996: Thabo Mbeki, former president of South Africa
- 23 August 1996: Infanta Elena, Duchess of Lugo
- 23 August 1996: Infanta Cristina of Spain
- 23 August 1996: José María Aznar, former prime minister of Spain
- 23 August 1996: Federico Trillo, former president of Chamber of Deputies, Spain
- 23 August 1996: Abel Matutes, former minister of foreign affairs
- 23 August 1996: Miguel Díaz Pache, former diplomat, Spain
- 23 August 1996: Cristina Barrios Almazor, former diplomat, Spain
- 23 August 1996: Raúl Morodo, former ambassador of Spain
- 23 August 1996: Rafael Spottorno, former secretary-general of Royal Household, Spain
- 23 August 1996: Fernando Almansa, former Head of Royal Household of HM King, Spain
- 10 February 1997: Carlos Veiga, former prime minister of Cape Verde
- 12 May 1997: Leonardo Santos Simão, former diplomat, Mozambique
- 12 May 1997: Francisco Caetano Madeira, former diplomat, Mozambique
- 9 June 1997: James Mitchel, former diplomat, Venezuela
- 18 August 1997: Paulo Souto, former governor of Bahia, Brazil
- 18 August 1997: Eduardo Azeredo, former governor of Minas Gerais, Brazil
- 18 August 1997: Marcello Alencar, former governor of Rio de Janeiro, Brazil
- 18 August 1997: Cristovam Buarque, former governor of Federal District, Brazil
- 18 August 1997: Mario Covas, former governor of São Paulo, Brazil
- 23 September 1997: Mihu Miron Biji, former ambassador of Romania
- 8 October 1997: Juan Ignacio Barrero, former president of Senate, Spain
- 15 October 1997: Walter Neuer, former ambassador of Germany
- 17 October 1997: Miguel Ángel Burelli Rivas, former minister of foreign affairs, Venezuela
- 17 October 1997: Nelson Valera Parra, former diplomat, Venezuela
- 17 October 1997: Fernando José de França Dias Van-Dúnem, former prime minister of Angola
- 21 November 1997: Elizabeth Frawley Bagley, former ambassador of United States
- 16 December 1997: Antônio Carlos Magalhães, former president of Senate, Brazil
- 16 December 1997: Eduardo Jorge Pereira, former secretary-general of Presidency, Brazil
- 16 December 1997: Clóvis Carvalho, former Minister of Development, Trade, Brazil
- 16 December 1997: Benedito Onofre Bezerra Leonel, former Chief of General Staff, Brazil
- 16 December 1997: José Israel Vargas, former Minister of Science and Technology, Brazil
- 16 December 1997: Luiz Carlos Bresser-Pereira, former Minister of Finance, Brazil
- 16 December 1997: Francisco Weffort, former minister of culture, Brazil
- 16 December 1997: José Botafogo Gonçalves, former minister of industry, Commerce, Brazil
- 16 December 1997: Benito Gama, former Federal Deputy, Brazil
- 16 December 1997: Adhemar Gabriel Bahadian, former ambassador of Brazil
- 16 December 1997: Ivan de Cannabrava, former diplomat, Brazil
- 16 December 1997: Alberto Mendes Cardoso, former Military Chief to President, Brazil
- 16 December 1997: Gelson Fonseca Jr., former diplomat, Brazil
- 16 December 1997: João Augusto de Médicis, former diplomat, Brazil
- 16 December 1997: Affonso Emilio de Alencastro Massot, former diplomat, Brazil
- 16 December 1997: Luis Tupy Calder de Moura, former diplomat, Brazil
- 13 March 1998: Jean-Claude Paye, former secretary-general, OECD
- 13 March 1998: Daniel Elm, former ambassador of Argentina
- 13 March 1998: Amílcar Spencer Lopes, former minister of foreign affairs, Cape Verde
- 16 April 1998: Oleksandr Moroz, former chairman of Verkhovna Rada, Ukraine
- 16 April 1998: Valeriy Pustovoitenko, former prime minister of Ukraine
- 16 April 1998: Hennadiy Udovenko, former minister of foreign affairs, Ukraine
- 12 May 1998: Empress Michiko of Japan
- 12 May 1998: Yukihiko Ikeda, former minister of foreign affairs, Japan
- 29 May 1998: Cristobal Fernández Daló, former president of Senate, Venezuela
- 29 May 1998: Asdrúbal Aguiar, former minister of interior, Venezuela
- 29 May 1998: Freddy Rojas Parra, former Minister of Finance, Venezuela
- 1 July 1998: Plácido Domingo, Spanish opera singer and conductor
- 20 July 1998: Alfredo Kraus, Spanish tenor
- 5 August 1998: Cardinal Jean-Marie Lustiger, Archbishop Emeritus of Paris
- 13 August 1998: Helmut Kohl, former chancellor of Germany
- 13 August 1998: Rita Süssmuth, former president of Bundestag, Germany
- 13 August 1998: Bernhard Vogel, former president of Bundesrat, Germany
- 13 August 1998: Edmund Stoiber, former president of Bundesrat, Germany
- 19 October 1998: Rosario Green, former Secretary of Foreign Affairs, Mexico
- 19 October 1998: Herminio Blanco Mendoza, former Secretary of Trade and Industry, Mexico
- 19 October 1998: Pedro González Rubio S., former diplomat, Mexico
- 19 October 1998: Salvador Campos Icardo, former diplomat, Mexico
- 27 October 1998: Peter Sutherland, former director, World Trade Organization
- 16 November 1998: Vartan Gregorian, American academic
- 4 February 1999: Dominique de Villepin, former prime minister of France
- 4 February 1999: Catherine Trautmann, former minister of culture, France
- 4 February 1999: Hubert Védrine, former minister of foreign affairs, France
- 27 May 1999: Anthony Giddens, British sociologist
- 31 May 1999: Cesária Évora, Cape Verdean singer-songwriter
- 9 July 1999: Vincente Loscertales, former diplomat, Spain
- 9 July 1999: Ole Philipson, former diplomat, Denmark
- 2 September 1999: Monika Wulf-Mathies, former European Commissioner
- 16 November 1999: Jan Arvesen, former ambassador of Norway
- 13 September 1999: Mohamed Khairet El Fattah Radi, former ambassador of Egypt
- 13 December 1999: Louis Michel, former minister of foreign affairs, Belgium
- 13 December 1999: Michel Corboz, Swiss conductor
- 13 December 1999: Constantinos Ailianos, former diplomat, Greece
- 13 December 1999: Emmanouil Gikas, former diplomat, Greece
- 13 December 1999: Georges Yennimatas, former diplomat, Greece
- 13 December 1999: Christos Rokofyllos, former diplomat, Greece
- 11 January 2000: José Patrício, former ambassador of Angola
- 11 January 2000: Alfred Missong jun., former ambassador of Austria
- 14 March 2000: José Sarney, former president of Brazil
- 14 March 2000: Ruth Cardoso, former first lady of Brazil
- 14 March 2000: Andrea Matarazzo, former diplomat, Brazil
- 14 March 2000: Rafael Greca, former mayor of Curitiba, Brazil
- 14 March 2000: Frederico Cezar de Araujo, former ambassador of Brazil
- 14 March 2000: Valter Pechy Moreira, former diplomat, Brazil
- 14 March 2000: Lauro Barbosa da Silva Moreira, former diplomat, Brazil
- 15 March 2000: Mircea Ionescu-Quintus, former president of Senate, Romania
- 15 March 2000: Ion Diaconescu, former president of Chamber of Deputies, Romania
- 15 March 2000: Mugur Isărescu, former prime minister of Romania
- 6 April 2000: Jorge Alberto Lozoya, former diplomat, Mexico
- 6 April 2000: José Ángel Gurría, former secretary-general, OECD
- 14 April 2000: Nikola Kaloudou, former ambassador of Bulgaria
- 12 May 2000: Luís Eduardo Magalhães, former president of Chamber of Deputies, Brazil
- 2 August 2000: Joaquim Rafael Branco, former prime minister of São Tomé and Príncipe
- 11 September 2000: José Rodríguez-Spiteri, former diplomat, Spain
- 11 September 2000: Alberto Aza, former secretary-general to HM King, Spain
- 11 September 2000: Juan Manuel de Barandica y Luxán, former ambassador of Spain
- 11 September 2000: Alfonso Sanz Portolés, former secretary-general of Royal Household, Spain
- 24 October 2000: Gregorio Peces-Barba, former president of Chamber of Deputies, Spain
- 12 December 2000: Lucas Mahlasela Makhubela, former diplomat, South Africa
- 3 January 2001: Guiseppe Acqua, former ambassador of Italy
- 5 February 2001: Gerald S. McGowan, former ambassador of the United States
- 16 February 2001: Walter Slaves, former ambassador of Peru
- 22 May 2001: Patricia Marsden‑Dole, former Trade Commissioner, Canada
- 18 June 2001: Pedro Comissário Afonso, former diplomat, Mozambique
- 4 July 2001: Niels Tillisch, former ambassador of Norway
- 16 July 2001: Krister Isaksson, former ambassador of Sweden
- 4 August 2001: Celso Lafer, former minister of foreign affairs, Brazil
- 26 September 2001: Jorge Rodríguez Grossi, former Minister of Economy, Tourism, Chile
- 26 September 2001: Heraldo Muñoz, former minister of foreign affairs, Chile
- 26 September 2001: Eduardo Araya Alemparte, former ambassador of Chile
- 8 November 2001: Jorge Giordani, former Minister of Finance, Venezuela
- 8 November 2001: Álvaro Silva Calderón, former Minister of Energy, Venezuela
- 8 November 2001: Luis Alfonso Dávila, former minister of foreign affairs, Venezuela
- 8 November 2001: Andrés Eloy Rondën, former ambassador of Venezuela
- 8 November 2001: María Lourdes Urbaneja, former diplomat, Venezuela
- 14 November 2001: Adalberto Rodríguez Giavarini, former minister of foreign affairs, Argentina
- 14 November 2001: Jesús Fernando Taboada, former diplomat, Argentina
- 3 January 2002: Roberto Antonione, former senator, Italy
- 3 January 2002: Salvatore Sechi, Italian historian
- 3 January 2002: Antonio Puri Purini, former diplomat, Italy
- 14 February 2002: Josef Hendrikus Jeurissen, former ambassador of the Netherlands
- 14 February 2002: Antônio Paulo Cachapuz de Medeiro, former diplomat, Brazil
- 5 April 2002: Peter Cosgrove, former Governor-General of Australia (then Defence Chief)
- 9 June 2002: Robert Bréchon, French poet and writer
- 18 August 2002: Margot Klestil-Löffler, former first lady of Austria
- 18 August 2002: Franz Schausberger, former governor of Salzburg, Austria
- 18 August 2002: Helmut Türk, former diplomat, Austria
- 25 September 2002: Enrique Pareja, former ambassador of Argentina
- 25 September 2002: John Campbell, former ambassador of Ireland
- 7 October 2002: Zorka Parvanova, former first lady of Bulgaria
- 7 October 2002: Lydia Shouleva, former deputy prime minister, Bulgaria
- 7 October 2002: Solomon Passy, former minister of foreign affairs, Bulgaria
- 7 October 2002: Meglena Kuneva, former minister of European affairs, Bulgaria
- 14 October 2002: Juan Carlos Rodríguez Ibarra, former president of Extremadura Government, Spain
- 16 October 2002: Jorge Gabriel Perdomo Martinez, former ambassador of Colombia
- 24 October 2002: Pentti Arajärvi, former First Gentleman of Finland
- 24 October 2002: Riitta Uosukainen, former Speaker of Parliament, Finland
- 24 October 2002: Paavo Lipponen, former prime minister of Finland
- 24 October 2002: Jan-Erik Enestam, former minister of defence, Finland
- 6 December 2002: Pierre Brochand, former diplomat, France
- 14 January 2003: Bunthan Bairaj-Vinichai, former ambassador of Thailand
- 16 January 2003: Synesio Sampaio Goes Son, former ambassador of Brazil
- 16 January 2003: Antonio Catalano di Melilli, former ambassador of Portugal
- 31 January 2003: Costas Simitis, former prime minister of Greece
- 31 January 2003: Apostolos Kaklamanis, former Speaker of Parliament, Greece
- 31 January 2003: Vasso Papandreou, former minister of interior, Greece
- 31 January 2003: Christos Pachtas, former Minister, Greece
- 31 January 2003: Andreas Loverdos, former Minister of Education, Greece
- 31 January 2003: Anastasios Skopelitis, former ambassador of Greece
- 31 January 2003: Ilias Plaskovitis, former banker, Greece
- 31 January 2003: Ioannis Vavvas, former ambassador of Greece
- 4 April 2003: Carlos Ruckauf, former Vice President of Argentina
- 29 May 2003: Ingrid Rüütel, former first lady of Estonia
- 29 May 2003: Ene Ergma, former Speaker of Riigikogu, Estonia
- 29 May 2003: Lennart Meri, former president of Estonia
- 29 May 2003: Juhan Parts, former prime minister of Estonia
- 29 May 2003: Meelis Atonen, former minister of economic affairs, Estonia
- 29 May 2003: Margus Leivo, former minister of interior, Estonia
- 29 May 2003: Kristiina Ojuland, former minister of foreign affairs, Estonia
- 29 May 2003: Tarmo Kõuts, former Commander of Defence Forces, Estonia
- 29 May 2003: Imants Freibergs, former first gentleman of Latvia
- 29 May 2003: Algirdas Brazauskas, former president of Lithuania
- 29 May 2003: Laima Paksienė, former first lady of Lithuania
- 29 May 2003: Artūras Paulauskas, former Speaker of Seimas, Lithuania
- 17 June 2003: József Bényi, former deputy foreign minister, Hungary
- 17 June 2003: Belisario Velasco, former minister of interior, Chile
- 23 July 2003: Mauro Vieira, Minister of Foreign Affairs, Brazil
- 23 July 2003: Tarso Genro, former Minister of Justice, Brazil
- 23 July 2003: Luiz Fernando Furlan, former minister of industry and Foreign Trade, Brazil
- 23 July 2003: Gilberto Gil, former minister of culture, Brazil
- 23 July 2003: José Gregori, former Minister of Justice, Brazil
- 23 July 2003: Luiz Dulci, former secretary-general of Presidency, Brazil
- 23 July 2003: Ruy de Lima Casaes e Silva, former diplomat, Brazil
- 23 July 2003: Paulo César de Oliveira Campos, former diplomat, Brazil
- 23 July 2003: Mário Vilalva, former diplomat, Brazil
- 28 July 2003: Paul Duhr, Marshal of Grand Ducal Court, Luxembourg
- 30 July 2003: Abdallah Salah Eddine Tazi, former ambassador of Morocco
- 3 September 2003: Dawlat Hassan, former ambassador of Egypt
- 11 September 2003: Wim Duisenberg, former president of European Central Bank
- 17 October 2003: Marcelo Andrade de Moraes Garden, former ambassador of Brazil
- 24 November 2003: Frank Carlucci, former Secretary of Defense, United States
- 13 February 2004: Queen Sonja of Norway
- 13 February 2004: Prince Haakon, Crown Prince of Norway
- 13 February 2004: Princess Mette-Marit, Crown Princess of Norway
- 13 February 2004: Princess Märtha Louise of Norway
- 11 March 2004: Wolfgang Kriechbaum, former diplomat, Austria
- 11 March 2004: Michel Cosentino, former diplomat, Italy
- 9 June 2004: Fernanda Montenegro, Brazilian actress
- 23 June 2004: Richard Holbrooke, former diplomat, United States
- 12 October 2004: José Alencar, former Vice President of Brazil
- 31 January 2005: Silvio Berlusconi, former prime minister of Italy
- 31 January 2005: Marcello Pera, former president of Senate, Italy
- 31 January 2005: Pier Ferdinando Casini, former president of Chamber of Deputies, Italy
- 31 January 2005: Franco Frattini, former minister of foreign affairs, Italy
- 31 January 2005: Antonio Martino, former minister of defence, Italy
- 31 January 2005: Gaetano Gifuni, former secretary-general to President, Italy
- 31 January 2005: Umberto Vattani, former secretary-general, Foreign Ministry, Italy
- 31 January 2005: Paolo Pucci di Benisichi, former secretary-general, Foreign Ministry, Italy
- 31 January 2005: Martin Bartenstein, former Minister of Economy and Labour, Austria
- 31 January 2005: Johannes Kyrle, former secretary-general, Foreign Ministry, Austria
- 31 January 2005: Rene Pollitzer, former diplomat, Austria
- 9 March 2005: Harold V. Livermore, British historian
- 9 March 2005: Heinrich von Pierer, former Advisor to the Government, Germany
- 21 April 2005: Marcos Vilaça, former president, Federal Audit Court, Brazil
- 21 April 2005: Sergio Telles, former ambassador of Brazil
- 21 April 2005: António Luís Pale, former president of Administrative Tribunal, Luxembourg
- 6 May 2005: Jean-Jacques Kasel, former Court Marshal, Luxembourg
- 6 May 2005: Fernand Boden, former minister of agriculture, Luxembourg
- 6 May 2005: François Biltgen, former Minister of Justice, Luxembourg
- 6 May 2005: Luc Frieden, former minister of defence, Luxembourg
- 6 May 2005: Mady Delvaux-Stehres, former Minister of Health, Luxembourg
- 6 May 2005: Marie-Josée Jacobs, former Minister of Family and Integration, Luxembourg
- 6 May 2005: Jean Asselborn, Minister of Foreign Affairs, Luxembourg
- 6 May 2005: Claude Wiseler, former Minister of Public Works, Luxembourg
- 6 May 2005: Jean-Marie Halsdorf, former minister of defence, Luxembourg
- 6 May 2005: Lucien Lux, former Minister of Transport, Luxembourg
- 6 May 2005: Mars Di Bartolomeo, former Minister of Health, Luxembourg
- 6 May 2005: Jeannot Krecké, former Minister of Economy, Luxembourg
- 6 May 2005: Nicolas Schmit, former deputy minister of foreign affairs, Luxembourg
- 11 July 2005: Mikael Essayan, United Kingdom
- 15 July 2005: Gabriel Ascencio, former president of Chamber of Deputies, Chile
- 15 July 2005: Marcos Libedinsky, former president of Supreme Court, Chile
- 15 July 2005: Sergio Romero Pizarro, former president of Senate, Chile
- 30 August 2005: Prince Khalid bin Faisal Al Saud of Saudi Arabia
- 6 October 2005: Kōichirō Matsuura, former Director-General, UNESCO
- 27 October 2005: Hideichiro Hamanaka, former ambassador of Japan
- 22 November 2005: Ignacio Walker, former minister of foreign affairs, Chile
- 3 January 2006: Jean-Louis Debré, former president of National Assembly, France
- 5 January 2006: Bill Gates, former Chief Executive Officer, Microsoft
- 14 February 2006: Mari Alkatiri, former prime minister of East Timor
- 8 March 2006: Prince Laurent of Belgium
- 8 March 2006: Princess Claire of Belgium
- 8 March 2006: Princess Astrid of Belgium
- 8 March 2006: Prince Lorenz of Belgium
- 8 March 2006: Guy Verhofstadt, former prime minister of Belgium
- 8 March 2006: Herman De Croo, former president of Chamber of Representatives, Belgium
- 8 March 2006: Anne-Marie Lizin, former president of Senate, Belgium
- 8 March 2006: Karel De Gucht, former minister of foreign affairs, Belgium
- 8 March 2006: Aivar Sõerd, former Minister of Finance, Estonia
- 8 March 2006: Villu Reiljan, former Minister of Environment, Estonia
- 8 March 2006: Aino Lepik von Wirén, former State Secretary, Estonia
- 21 July 2006: Hans-Bodo Bertram, former ambassador of Germany
- 21 July 2006: Manuel Veremendi i Serra, former ambassador of Peru
- 21 July 2006: Cheng Zying, former ambassador of China
- 25 September 2006: Vicente Álvarez Areces, former president of Principality of Asturias, Spain
- 25 September 2006: María Antonia Trujillo, former Minister of Housing, Spain
- 25 September 2006: Mercedes Cabrera, former Minister of Education and Science, Spain
- 25 September 2006: Miguel Ángel Moratinos, former minister of foreign affairs, Spain
- 25 September 2006: Bernardino León, former Secretary of State for Foreign Affairs, Spain
- 25 September 2006: Alberto Ruiz-Gallardón, former mayor of Madrid, Spain
- 25 September 2006: Joan Clos, former mayor of Barcelona, Spain
- 25 September 2006: Cristina Narbona, First Vice-President of Senate, Spain
- 25 September 2006: Ricardo Díez-Hochleitner Rodríguez, former Secretary General, Royal Household, Spain
- 25 September 2006: Alberto José Navarro González, former ambassador of Spain
- 25 September 2006: Luis Calvo Merino, former diplomat, Spain
- 25 September 2006: Nicolas Martinez Fresno, former diplomat, Spain
- 25 September 2006: Enrique Panels, former diplomat, Spain
- 29 September 2006: Henrique Serrano, former diplomat, Spain
- 29 September 2006: Manuel Quijada, former ambassador of Venezuela
- 29 September 2006: Arnt Magne Rindal, former ambassador of Norway
- 29 September 2006: Herman Reijer Reimond Virgiel Froger, former ambassador of the Netherlands
- 20 November 2006: Zergün Korutürk, former ambassador of Turkey
- 27 November 2006: Richard Eckaus, Emeritus Professor, Massachusetts Institute of Technology
- 27 November 2006: Robert Solow, Emeritus Professor, Massachusetts Institute of Technology
- 27 February 2007: Rubén Ramírez Lezcano, former minister of foreign affairs, Paraguay
- 6 March 2007: Pascoela Barreto, former ambassador of East Timor
- 30 March 2007: Plinio Apuleyo Mendoza, former ambassador of Colombia
- 2 April 2007: Paul Ponjaert, former ambassador of Belgium
- 13 April 2007: Antonio Paes de Andrade, former ambassador of Brazil
- 31 May 2007: Alma Adamkienė, former first lady of Lithuania
- 31 May 2007: Petras Vaitiekūnas, former minister of foreign affairs, Lithuania
- 31 May 2007: Raimondas Šukys, former minister of interior, Lithuania
- 25 July 2007: Albert Pintat, former prime minister of Andorra
- 3 December 2007: Pensak Chalarak, former ambassador of Thailand
- 25 January 2008: Patrick Gautrat, former ambassador of France
- 5 March 2008: Queen Rania of Jordan
- 5 March 2008: Cesar Maia, former mayor of Rio de Janeiro
- 5 March 2008: Jaques Wagner, former governor of Bahia
- 5 March 2008: Sérgio Cabral Filho, former governor of Rio de Janeiro
- 5 March 2008: Ubiratan Castro de Araújo, Brazil
- 2 May 2008: Queen Silvia of Sweden
- 2 May 2008: Kirstine von Blixen-Finecke, Chief Court Mistress, Sweden
- 2 May 2008: Tobias Billström, Minister of Foreign Affairs, Sweden
- 2 May 2008: Andreas Carlgren, former Minister of Environment, Sweden
- 2 May 2008: Herman af Trolle, former Head of Protocol, Sweden
- 2 May 2008: Maria Gabriella Lindholm, former ambassador of Sweden
- 2 May 2008: Lars-Hjalmar Wide, former diplomat, Sweden
- 26 May 2008: Berit Tversland, former Cabinet Secretary, Royal Court, Norway
- 26 May 2008: Ulf Erik Husebø, former Head of Adjutant Staff, Norway
- 26 May 2008: Lars Christian Krog, Master of the Royal Household, Norway
- 26 May 2008: Bjørn T. Grydeland, former Permanent Undersecretary of State, Norway
- 26 May 2008: Inga Magistad, former ambassador of Norway
- 26 May 2008: Ove Thorsheim, former ambassador of Norway
- 26 May 2008: Rolf Trolle Andersen, former Lord Chamberlain, Norway
- 30 July 2008: Luís de Matos Monteiro da Fonseca, former Executive Secretary, Lusophone Commonwealth
- 1 September 2008: Maria Kaczyńska, former first lady of Poland
- 17 November 2008: Samir Arrour, former ambassador of Morocco
- 26 November 2008: Prince Léopold, 13th Duke of Arenberg, Belgium
- 30 December 2008: Assunção dos Anjos, former minister of foreign affairs, Angola
- 2 March 2009: Eva Köhler, former first lady of Germany
- 2 March 2009: Angela Merkel, former chancellor of Germany
- 16 March 2009: Amer Al-Fayez, former Head of Royal Protocol, Jordan
- 16 March 2009: Dina Kawar, former ambassador of Jordan
- 16 March 2009: Amer Hadidi, President of Royal Jordanian
- 16 March 2009: Nasser Judeh, former deputy prime minister, Jordan
- 16 March 2009: Ayman Safadi, Deputy Prime Minister of Jordan
- 16 March 2009: Nasser Lozi, Chairman of Jordan Kuwait Bank
- 20 April 2009: Sheikha Moza bint Nasser, Consort of Emir of Qatar
- 21 May 2009: Sydney Brenner, biologist and Nobel laureate, United Kingdom
- 1 December 2009: Mariano Fernández, former diplomat, Chile
- 21 December 2009: Atul Khare, former diplomat, India
- 5 March 2010: Jaume Bartumeu, former prime minister of Andorra
- 6 May 2010: Jean-Claude Trichet, former president, European Central Bank
- 11 May 2010: Domenico Giani, former Inspector General, Gendarmerie Corps, Vatican City
- 11 May 2010: Alberto Gasbarri, former diplomat, Italy
- 1 June 2010: Mauritius Ribot, former ambassador of Mexico
- 26 July 2010: Lars Vissing, former ambassador of Denmark
- 7 September 2010: Pierre Mores, Marshal of Royal Court, Luxembourg
- 7 September 2010: Alain de Muyser, former diplomat, Luxembourg
- 6 October 2010: Celso Vieira de Souza, former ambassador of Brazil
- 23 November 2010: Miguel de Polignac Mascarenhas de Barros, former diplomat, Finance
- 23 November 2010: Alberto Leoncini Bartoli, former ambassador of Italy
- 23 November 2010: Élie de Comminges, former French historian
- 21 April 2011: Jean-Claude Piris, former diplomat, France
- 10 June 2011: Colette Avital, former Member of Knesset, Israel
- 13 September 2011: Luca del Balzo di Presenzano, former ambassador of Italy
- 10 May 2012: Cláudio de Jesus Ximenes, former president of Supreme Court, East Timor
- 8 June 2012: Robert W. Wilson, United States
- 30 July 2012: Domingos Simões Pereira, Prime Minister of Guinea-Bissau
- 19 November 2012: Luis Peirano, former minister of culture, Peru
- 19 November 2012: Rafael Roncagliolo, former ambassador of Peru
- 13 December 2012: Željko Vukosav, former ambassador of Croatia
- 28 January 2013: Jorge Faurie, former minister of foreign affairs, Argentina
- 15 October 2013: Helmut Elfenkämper, former ambassador of Portugal
- 14 February 2014: Enrique V. Iglesias, former president, Inter-American Development Bank
- 4 March 2014: Félix Sanz Roldán, former director of national intelligence, Spain
- 9 May 2014: Guo Jiading, former ambassador of China
- 2 June 2014: Angélica Rivera, former first lady of Mexico
- 29 July 2014: Hendrik Soeters, former ambassador of the Netherlands
- 23 October 2014: Johan Molander, former ambassador of Sweden
- 28 January 2015: José Antonio Meade, former Secretary of Finance, Mexico
- 28 January 2015: Benito Andion, former ambassador of Mexico
- 2 June 2015: Pedro Morenés, former Minister of Defense, Spain
- 9 June 2015: Ernest Moniz, former Secretary of Energy, United States
- 9 June 2015: Alberto Núñez Feijóo, former president of Galicia Region, Spain
- 3 September 2015: Renato Varriale, former ambassador of Italy
- 19 November 2015: María Ángela Holguín, former minister of foreign affairs, Colombia
- 19 November 2015: Chakorn Suchiva, former ambassador of Thailand
- 23 April 2016: Paul Gallagher, Secretary for Relations with States, Holy See
- 23 April 2016: Giovanni Angelo Becciu, Cardinal Deacon of San Lino
- 8 June 2016: Cleonice Berardinelli, Brazilian academic
- 28 June 2016: Cardinal Seán Patrick O'Malley, Archbishop of Boston
- 28 November 2016: Juan José Buitrago De Benito, former ambassador of Spain
- 28 November 2016: Fernando Eguidazu Palacios, former Secretary of State, Spain
- 28 November 2016: María Victoria Morera, Director-General for Europe, Spain
- 28 November 2016: Juan Ruiz Casas, former Chief of Military Staff, Royal Household, Spain
- 9 December 2016: Ali Adel A Alkhal Fakhro, former ambassador of Qatar
- 30 January 2017: Georgios Katrougalos, former minister of foreign affairs, Greece
- 30 January 2017: Ekaterini Simpoulou, former ambassador of Greece
- 10 March 2017: Robert A. Sherman, former ambassador of United States
- 6 April 2017: Amadou-Mahtar M'Bow, former Director-General, UNESCO
- 23 May 2017: Maria Teresa, Grand Duchess of Luxembourg
- 23 May 2017: Xavier Bettel, Prime Minister of Luxembourg
- 23 May 2017: Etienne Schneider, former deputy prime minister of Luxembourg
- 23 May 2017: Jean-Jacques Welfring, former ambassador of Luxembourg
- 25 July 2017: Caroline Fleetwood, former ambassador of Sweden
- 13 November 2017: María Clemencia de Santos, former first lady of Colombia
- 22 November 2017: Lígia Fonseca, former first lady of Cape Verde
- 22 November 2017: Thomas Stelzer, Ambassador of Austria
- 15 April 2018: Alfonso Dastis, former minister of foreign affairs, Spain
- 15 April 2018: Jaime Alfonsín, Chief of Royal Household, Spain
- 9 May 2018: Karima Benyaich, former ambassador of Morocco
- 10 June 2018: José Manuel Fonseca de Moura, Professor, Carnegie Mellon University, USA
- 19 July 2018: Govert Jan Bijl de Vroe, former ambassador of the Netherlands
- 1 August 2018: Michael Suhr, former ambassador of Denmark
- 22 November 2018: Ana Dias Lourenço, First Lady of Angola
- 6 December 2018: Pierre Moscovici, former European Commissioner for Economic Affairs
- 17 January 2019: Michel Barnier, former Chief Negotiator, Task Force 50
- 5 April 2019: Carmenza Jaramillo Gutiérrez, former ambassador of Colombia
- 18 November 2019: Luiz Alberto Figueiredo, former ambassador of Brazil
- 18 December 2020: George Edward Glass, former ambassador of the United States
- 9 September 2021: Rebeca Grynspan, Secretary-General, UNCTAD
- 1 October 2021: Evaristo Carvalho, former president of São Tomé and Príncipe
- 16 February 2022: Carlos Alberto Simas Magalhães, former ambassador of Brazil
- 15 June 2022: Martin Ney, former ambassador of Germany
- 21 July 2022: Catharina Maria Trooster, former ambassador of the Netherlands
- 20 April 2023: Ho Iat Seng, Chief Executive of Macau
- 22 April 2023: Rosângela Lula da Silva, First Lady of Brazil
- 15 June 2023: Charles Wellesley, 9th Duke of Wellington
- 2 September 2023: Edgar Morin, French philosopher
- 6 September 2023: Isidro Fainé Casas, Spain

== See also ==
- List of recipients of the Grand Collar of the Order of Prince Henry
