= Azambuja (surname) =

Azambuja is a Portuguese surname occurring mainly in Brazil. Notable people with the surname include:

- Diogo de Azambuja (1432–1518), Portuguese noble and explorer
- Marcos Azambuja (1935–2025), Brazilian diplomat
- Péricles Azambuja (1927–2012), Brazilian historian, writer and journalist
- Reinaldo Azambuja (born 1963), Brazilian politician and businessman

== See also ==
- Luan Rodrigues (Luan Rodrigues Azambuja; born 1996), Brazilian footballer
