= Étienne Davignon =

Belgian diplomat and civil servant (1932–2026)

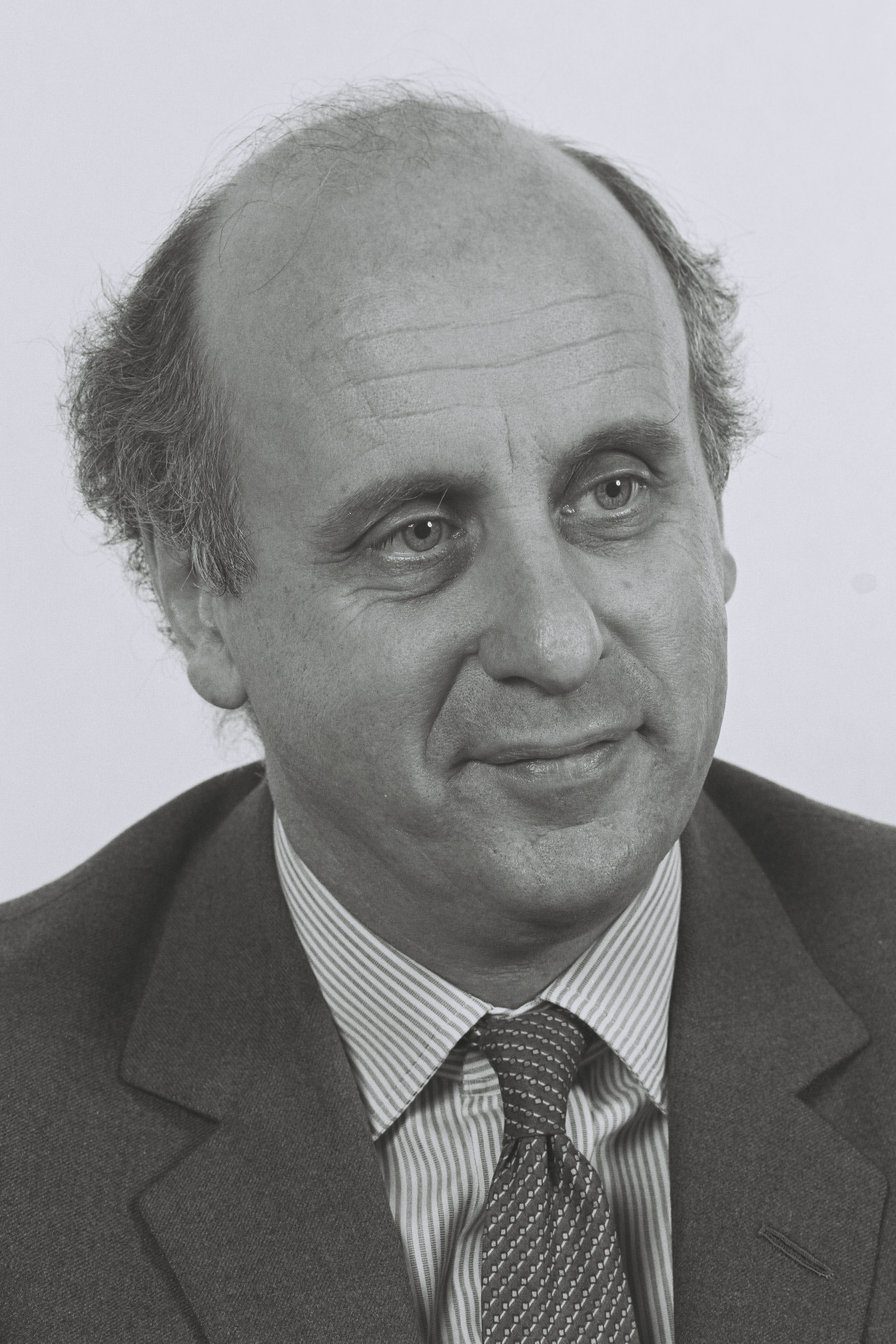
- Davignon in 1980

European Commissioner for Industrial Affairs and Energy
- In office 6 January 1981 – 6 January 1985
- President: Gaston Thorn
- Preceded by: Himself (Internal Market, Customs Union and Industrial Affairs); Guido Brunner (Energy, the Science and Research)
- Succeeded by: Karl-Heinz Narjes (Industry, Information Technology, Science and Research); Nicolas Mosar (Energy)

European Commissioner for the Internal Market, the Customs Union and Industrial Affairs
- In office 6 January 1977 – 6 January 1981
- President: Roy Jenkins
- Preceded by: Finn Olav Gundelach (Internal Market and the Customs Union); Cesidio Guazzaroni (Industry and Technology)
- Succeeded by: Karl-Heinz Narjes (Internal Market, Industrial Innovation, the Customs Union, the Environment, Consumer Protection and Nuclear Safety); Himself (Industrial Affairs and Energy)

Personal details
- Born: 4 October 1932 Budapest, Hungary
- Died: 18 May 2026 (aged 93) Brussels, Belgium
- Party: Humanist Democratic Centre
- Domestic partner: Antoinette Spaak (died 2020)
- Relatives: Julien Davignon (grandfather)
- Education: Catholic University of Louvain
- Davignon's voice Davignon announcing the establishment of steel production quotas. Recorded 15 May 1981

Étienne, Count Davignon (French pronunciation: [etjɛn daviɲɔ̃]; 4 October 1932 – 18 May 2026) was a Belgian diplomat and civil servant who served as European Commissioner from 1977 to 1985.

In March 2026, a Belgian court ruled that Davignon could stand trial for his alleged role in events leading to the assassination of Congolese independence leader Patrice Lumumba in January 1961. He was accused of involvement in the unlawful detention and degrading treatment of Lumumba. Davignon was serving as a junior diplomatic intern in Kinshasa at the time. Davignon consistently denied the allegations.

== Career ==
After receiving a Doctorate of Law from the Catholic University of Louvain, Davignon joined the Belgian Foreign Ministry, in 1959, and within two years had become an attaché under Paul-Henri Spaak, then Minister of Foreign Affairs. He remained in Belgian government until 1965. In 1970, he chaired the committee of experts which produced the Davignon report on foreign policy for Europe.

From 1974 to 1977, Davignon was the first head of the International Energy Agency, before becoming a member of the European Commission, of which he was vice-president from 1981 until 1985. From 1989 to 2001, he was chairman of the Belgian bank Société Générale de Belgique, which is now part of the French supplier Engie and was not an arm of the French bank Société Générale, but a Belgian institution. As of 2010, he was Vice Chairman of Suez subsidiary Suez-Tractebel.

As chairman of Société Générale de Belgique, he was a member of the European Round Table of Industrialists. At the time of his death in 2026 he was the co-chairman of the EU-Japan Business Dialogue Round Table, chairman of the Paul-Henri Spaak Foundation, president of the Egmont – Royal Institute for International Relations, chairman of CSR Europe, chairman of the European Academy of Business in Society and was chairman of the annual Bilderberg conference from 1998 to 2001. He was a member of the Steering Committee of the Bilderberg Group.

Davignon was the chairman of the board of directors of Brussels Airlines, which he co-founded after the bankruptcy of Sabena. He was also a member of the board of numerous Belgian companies, and was the chairman of the board of directors and of the General Assembly of the ICHEC Brussels Management School.

On 26 January 2004, Albert II of Belgium gave him the honorary title of Minister of State, which entitled him to a seat on the Crown Council of Belgium.

In 2018, Philippe of Belgium conferred the title of Count Davignon upon him.

Davignon was a crucial member of the Strategic Advisory Panel of The European Business Awards. He was a member of the Cercle Gaulois and a member of the advisory board of the Itinera Institute think tank. He was also president of the Brussels-based think tank Friends of Europe.

== Alleged involvement in the dismissal and assassination of Patrice Lumumba ==
Davignon's role as a junior diplomatic intern in Kinshasa at the time of Patrice Lumumba's dismissal as prime minister in September 1960 and his assassination in January 1961 has been a subject of scrutiny. A Belgian parliamentary inquiry in 2001 concluded that although there was no proof of direct involvement, the Belgian state and certain officials bore a "moral responsibility" for the circumstances leading to Lumumba's death. The inquiry said that Davignon was "tasked with convincing then-Congolese President Joseph Kasa Vubu to dismiss Lumumba [as prime minister] and providing him with the necessary legal arguments."

Davignon wrote a telex in September 1960 stating that it was a "primordial problem to remove Lumumba and achieve unity of the Congolese leaders against him". In a 2010 interview, Davignon denied that this meant a call for Lumumba to be killed.

In 2011, Lumumba's family filed a complaint in Belgium accusing several individuals, including Davignon, of involvement in the assassination. Following a lengthy investigation, the Belgian federal prosecutor's office announced in June 2025 that it was requesting Davignon, the sole surviving defendant, be tried on charges of war crimes, specifically for his alleged role in the unlawful detention and degrading treatment of Lumumba. Prosecutors added that a charge of intent to kill should be dropped. Prosecutors alleged that Davignon had knowledge of the plan to arrest Patrice Lumumba in September 1960. On 20 January, judges at the Brussels Criminal Court’s Council Chamber heard Davignon's legal defense on why the case should not go to trial. On 17 March, it was decided that Davignon would stand trial.

In 2026, Davignon died before he could stand trial.

== Personal life and death ==
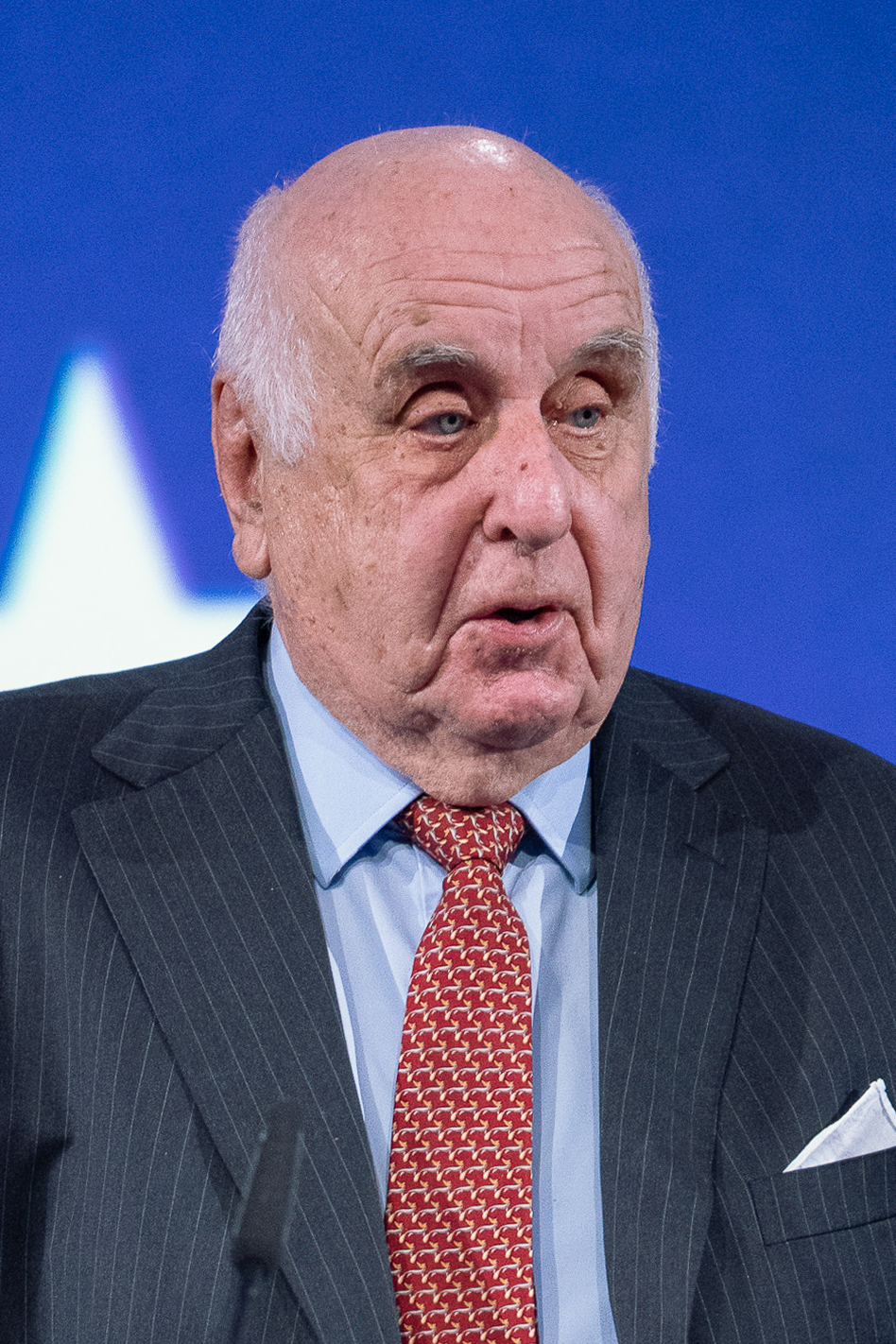
Davignon in 2024

Davignon was the long-term partner of Antoinette Spaak, daughter of Paul-Henri Spaak, whom he had met while working as his chef de cabinet. The two began dating c. 1968, and remained in a relationship until Spaak's death in 2020.

His grandfather, Julien Davignon, also served in the government of Belgium, being Minister for Foreign Affairs in 1914, at the outbreak of World War I.

Davignon died in Brussels on 18 May 2026, at the age of 93.

Political offices
Preceded by Henri Simonet	Belgian European Commissioner; 1977–1985	Succeeded by Willy De Clercq
Preceded by Finn Olav Gundelach as European Commissioner for the Internal Market and the Customs Union	European Commissioner for the Internal Market, the Customs Union and Industrial Affairs; 1977–1981	Succeeded by Karl-Heinz Narjes as European Commissioner for the Internal Market, Industrial Innovation, the Customs Union, the Environment, Consumer Protection and Nuclear Safety
Preceded by Cesidio Guazzaroni as European Commissioner for Industry and Technology	European Commissioner for the Internal Market, the Customs Union and Industrial Affairs; 1977–1981	Succeeded by Himself as European Commissioner for Industrial Affairs and Energy
Preceded by Himself as European Commissioner for the Internal Market, Customs Union and Industrial Affairs	European Commissioner for Industrial Affairs and Energy; 1977–1981	Succeeded by Karl-Heinz Narjes as European Commissioner for Industry, Information Technology, Science and Research
Preceded by Guido Brunner as European Commissioner for Energy, the Science and Research	European Commissioner for Industrial Affairs and Energy; 1977–1981	Succeeded by Nicolas Mosar as European Commissioner for Energy
