= List of recipients of the Grand Collar of the Order of Prince Henry =

The Order of Prince Henry (Portuguese: Ordem do Infante Dom Henrique) is a Portuguese order of knighthood created on 2 June 1960, to commemorate the quincentenary of the death of the Portuguese prince Henry the Navigator, one of the main initiators of the Age of Discovery. Minor reforms of the constitution of the Order occurred in 1962 and 1980. It is a five-tier order, whose titles are awarded for relevant services to Portugal and for services in the expansion of the Portuguese culture, its history and its values (with a particular focus on its maritime history). The number of members in each grade is restricted by its constitution, and titles are attributed by special decree by the Grand Master of the Order, ex officio the President of Portugal.

The following is a complete list of Portuguese citizens and institutions awarded the Grand Collar of the Order, the highest grade, usually reserved for heads of state.

Source for the list: "Entidades Nacionais Agraciadas com Ordens Portuguesas", Ordens Honoríficas Portuguesas (Office of the President of Portugal). Retrieved 18 February 2019.

== List ==
indicates Portuguese nationals

No.	Photo	Recipient	Lifespan	Country	Date appointed	Notes
1		Juscelino Kubitschek	1902–1976	Brazil	20 October 1960	President of Brazil (1956–1961)
2		Humberto de Alencar Castelo Branco	1897–1967	Brazil	21 July 1965	President of Brazil (1964–1967)
3		Mohammad Reza Pahlavi	1919–1980	Iran	27 July 1967	Shah of Iran (1941–1979)
4		Anastasio Somoza Debayle	1925–1980	Nicaragua	19 February 1968	President of Nicaragua (1967–1972; 1974–1979)
5		António de Oliveira Salazar	1889–1970	Portugal	4 October 1968	President of the Council of Ministers (1932–1968)
6		Prince Philip, Duke of Edinburgh	1921–2021	United Kingdom	31 May 1973	Consort of the British Monarch (1952–2021)
7		Elena Ceaușescu	1916–1989	Romania	12 June 1975	First Lady of Romania (1974–1989)
8		Edward Gierek	1913–2001	Poland	16 March 1976	First Secretary of the Polish United Workers' Party (1970–1980)
9		Henryk Jabłoński	1909–2003	Poland	16 March 1976	Chairman of the Council of State of Poland (1972–1985)
10		Piotr Jaroszewicz	1909–1992	Poland	16 March 1976	Prime Minister of Poland (1970–1980)
11		Marshal Josip Broz Tito	1892–1980	Yugoslavia	2 April 1978	President of Yugoslavia (1953–1980)
12		Juan Carlos I, King of Spain	born 1938	Spain	17 April 1978	King of Spain (1975–2014)
13		Valéry Giscard d'Estaing	1926–2020	France	21 October 1978	President of France (1974–1981)
14		Ernesto Geisel	1907–1996	Brazil	13 February 1979	President of Brazil (1974–1979)
15		Pál Losonczi	1919–2005	Hungary	14 August 1979	Chairman of the Presidential Council of Hungary (1967–1987)
16		Todor Zhivkov	1911–1998	Bulgaria	21 August 1979	Chairman of the State Council of Bulgaria (1971–1989)
17		Baudouin	1930–1993	Belgium	24 August 1982	King of the Belgians (1951–1993)
18		Samora Machel	1933–1986	Mozambique	30 August 1982	President of Mozambique (1975–1986)
19		Hosni Mubarak	1928–2020	Egypt	19 August 1983	President of Egypt (1981–2011)
20		Fra' Angelo de Mojana di Cologna	1905–1988	SMOM	2 September 1983	Prince and Grand Master of the Sovereign Military Order of Malta (1962–1988)
21		François Mitterrand	1916–1996	France	29 September 1983	President of France (1981–1996)
22		Rudolf Kirchschläger	1915–2000	Austria	18 April 1984	President of Austria (1974–1986)
23		Margrethe II	born 1940	Denmark	20 June 1984	Queen of Denmark (1972–2024)
24		Denis Sassou Nguesso	born 1943	Republic of the Congo	24 November 1984	President of the Republic of the Congo (1979–1992; 1997–present)
25		Mobutu Sese Seko	1930–1997	Zaire	12 December 1984	President of Zaire (1971–1997)
26		Jean	1921–2019	Luxembourg	29 September 1985	Grand Duke of Luxembourg (1964–2000)
27		Manuel Pinto da Costa	born 1937	São Tomé and Príncipe	31 January 1986	President of São Tomé and Príncipe (1975–1991; 2011–2016)
28		Aristides Pereira	1923–2011	Cape Verde	31 January 1986	President of Cape Verde (1975–1991)
29		Carl XVI Gustaf	born 1946	Sweden	13 January 1987	King of Sweden (1973–present)
30		Jaime Lusinchi	1924–2014	Venezuela	21 January 1987	President of Venezuela (1984–1989)
31		José Eduardo dos Santos	1942–2022	Angola	25 January 1988	President of Angola (1979–2017)
32		Virgilio Barco Vargas	1921–2017	Colombia	4 February 1989	President of Colombia (1986–1990)
33		Richard von Weizsäcker	1920–2015	Germany	19 June 1989	President of Germany (1984–1994)
34		Rodrigo Borja Cevallos	born 1935	Ecuador	22 March 1990	President of Ecuador (1988–1992)
35		Francesco Cossiga	1928–2010	Italy	22 March 1990	President of Italy (1985–1992)
36		Fra' Andrew Bertie	1929–2008	SMOM	22 March 1990	Prince and Grand Master of the Sovereign Military Order of Malta (1988–2008)
37		Joaquim Chissano	born 1939	Mozambique	9 April 1990	President of Mozambique (1986–2005)
38		Christos Sartzetakis	1929–2022	Cyprus	12 November 1990	President of Cyprus (1985–1990)
39		Brunó Ferenc Straub	1914–1996	Hungary	12 November 1990	Chairman of the Presidential Council of Hungary (1988–1989)
40		Beatrix	born 1938	Netherlands	14 May 1991	Queen of the Netherlands (1980–2013)
41		Mauno Koivisto	1923–2017	Finland	22 April 1992	President of Finland (1982–1994)
42		Hassan II	1929–1999	Morocco	26 March 1993	King of Morocco (1961–1999)
43		Sir Dawda Jawara	1924–2019	Gambia	4 October 1993	President of the Gambia (1970–1994)
44		Lech Wałęsa	born 1943	Poland	18 October 1994	President of Poland (1990–1995)
45		Nelson Mandela	1918–2013	South Africa	20 November 1995	President of South Africa (1994–1999)
46		Juan Carlos Wasmosy	born 1938	Paraguay	17 December 1995	President of Paraguay (1993–1998)
47		Aleksander Kwaśniewski	born 1954	Poland	9 February 1997	President of Poland (1995–2005)
48		Rafael Caldera	1916–2009	Venezuela	17 October 1997	President of Venezuela (1969–1974; 1994–1999)
49		Leonid Kuchma	born 1938	Ukraine	16 April 1998	President of Ukraine (1994–2005)
50		Akihito	born 1933	Japan	12 May 1998	Emperor of Japan (1989–2019)
51		Roman Herzog	1934–2017	Germany	13 August 1998	President of Germany (1994–1999)
52		Ernesto Zedillo	born 1951	Mexico	30 September 1998	President of Mexico (1994–2000)
53		Jacques Chirac	1932–2019	France	4 February 1999	President of France (1995–2017)
54		Albert II	born 1934	Belgium	13 December 1999	King of the Belgians (1993–2013)
55		Konstantinos Stephanopoulos	1926–2016	Greece	13 December 1999	President of Greece (1995–2005)
56		Fernando Henrique Cardoso	born 1931	Brazil	14 March 2000	President of Brazil (1995–2003)
57		Emil Constantinescu	born 1939	Romania	15 March 2000	President of Romania (1996–2000)
58		Milan Kučan	born 1941	Slovenia	29 March 2000	President of Slovenia (1991–2002)
59		António Mascarenhas Monteiro	1944–2016	Cape Verde	8 June 2000	President of Cape Verde (1991–2001)
60		Vasco Joaquim Rocha Vieira	1939–2025	Portugal	20 September 2001	Governor of Macau (1992–1999); Chancellor of the Ancient Military Orders (2006–2006)
61		Ricardo Lagos	born 1938	Chile	26 September 2001	President of Chile (2000–2006)
62		Fernando de la Rúa	1937–2019	Argentina	14 November 2001	President of Argentina (1999–2001)
63		Omar Bongo	1935–2009	Gabon	17 December 2001	President of Gabon (1967–2009)
64		Carlo Azeglio Ciampi	1920–2016	Italy	3 January 2002	President of Italy (1999–2006)
65		Alpha Oumar Konaré	born 1946	Mali	27 February 2002	President of Mali (1992–2002)
66		Pedro Pires	born 1934	Cape Verde	22 April 2002	President of Cape Verde (2001–2011)
67		Thomas Klestil	1932–2004	Austria	19 August 2002	President of Austria (1992–2004)
68		Georgi Parvanov	born 1957	Bulgaria	7 October 2002	President of Bulgaria (2002–2012)
69		Ferenc Mádl	1931–2011	Hungary	7 October 2002	President of Hungary (2000–2005)
70		Tarja Halonen	born 1943	Finland	24 October 2002	President of Finland (2000–2012)
71		Abdelaziz Bouteflika	1937–2021	Algeria	14 January 2003	President of Algeria (1999–2019)
72		Arnold Rüütel	1928–2024	Estonia	29 May 2003	President of Estonia (2001–2006)
73		Vaira Vīķe-Freiberga	born 1937	Latvia	29 May 2003	President of Latvia (1999–2007)
74		Rolandas Paksas	born 1956	Lithuania	29 May 2003	President of Lithuania (2003–2004)
75		Harald V	born 1937	Norway	13 February 2004	King of Norway (1991–present)
76		Heinz Fischer	born 1938	Austria	31 January 2005	President of Austria (2004–2016)
77		Henri	born 1955	Luxembourg	6 May 2005	Grand Duke of Luxembourg (2000–2025)
78		Nicanor Duarte	born 1956	Paraguay	21 September 2005	President of Paraguay (2003–2008)
79		Xanana Gusmão	born 1946	East Timor	14 February 2006	President of East Timor (2002–2007); Prime Minister of East Timor (2007–2015; 2023–present)
80		Valdas Adamkus	born 1926	Lithuania	31 May 2007	President of Lithuania (1998–2003, 2004–2009)
81		José Ramos-Horta	born 1949	East Timor	13 November 2007	President of East Timor (2007–2012; 2022–present)
82		Abdullah II	born 1962	Jordan	5 March 2008	King of Jordan (1999–present)
83		Lech Kaczyński	1949–2010	Poland	1 September 2008	President of Poland (2005–2010)
84		Michelle Bachelet	born 1951	Chile	7 November 2008	President of Chile (2006–2010, 2014–2018)
85		Hugo Chávez	1954–2013	Venezuela	8 November 2008	President of Venezuela (1999–2002; 2002–2013)
86		Eddie Fenech Adami	born 1934	Malta	11 December 2008	President of Malta (2004–2009)
87		Horst Köhler	1943–2025	Germany	2 March 2009	President of Germany (2004–2010)
88		Hamad bin Khalifa Al Thani	born 1952	Qatar	20 April 2009	Emir of Qatar (1995–2013)
89		Abdullah Gül	born 1950	Turkey	10 May 2009	President of Turkey (2007–2014)
90		Bronisław Komorowski	born 1952	Poland	19 April 2012	President of Poland (2010–2015)
91		Taur Matan Ruak	born 1956	East Timor	10 May 2012	President of East Timor (2012–2017)
92		Jorge Carlos Fonseca	born 1950	Cape Verde	11 June 2012	President of Cape Verde (2011–2021)
93		Juan Manuel Santos	born 1951	Colombia	14 November 2012	President of Colombia (2012–2018)
94		Ollanta Humala	born 1962	Peru	19 November 2012	President of Peru (2011–2016)
95		Ricardo Martinelli	born 1951	Panama	29 July 2013	President of Panama (2009–2014)
96		Enrique Peña Nieto	born 1966	Mexico	2 June 2014	President of Mexico (2012–2018)
97		Armando Guebuza	born 1943	Mozambique	1 July 2014	President of Mozambique (2005–2015)
98		José Manuel Barroso	born 1956	Colombia	3 November 2014	Prime Minister of Portugal (2002–2004); President of the European Commission (2004–2014)
99		Klaus Iohannis	born 1959	Romania	17 June 2015	President of Romania (2014–2025)
100		António Ramalho Eanes	born 1935	Portugal	20 June 2016	President of Portugal (1976–1986)
101		Abdel Fattah el-Sisi	born 1954	Egypt	21 November 2016	President of Egypt (2014–present)
102		Tomislav Nikolić	born 1952	Serbia	25 January 2017	President of Serbia (2012–2017)
103		Prokopis Pavlopoulos	born 1950	Greece	27 January 2017	President of Greece (2015–2020)
104		Horacio Cartes	born 1956	Paraguay	10 May 2017	President of Paraguay (2013–2018)
105		Macky Sall	born 1961	Senegal	23 May 2017	President of Senegal (2012–2024)
106		Alassane Ouattara	born 1942	Ivory Coast	12 September 2017	President of Ivory Coast (2010–present)
107		Willem-Alexander	born 1967	Netherlands	10 October 2017	King of the Netherlands (2013–present)
108		Queen Máxima of the Netherlands	born 1971	Netherlands	10 October 2017	Queen Consort of the Netherlands (2013–present)
109		Frank-Walter Steinmeier	born 1956	Germany	1 March 2018	President of Germany (2017–present)
110		Jorge Sampaio	1939–2021	Germany	5 April 2018	President of Portugal (1996–2006)
111		Kolinda Grabar-Kitarović	born 1968	Croatia	27 April 2018	President of Croatia (2015–2020)
112		Marie-Louise Coleiro Preca	born 1958	Malta	15 May 2018	President of Malta (2014–2019)
113		Philippe	born 1960	Belgium	22 October 2018	King of the Belgians (2013–present)
114		Queen Mathilde of Belgium	born 1973	Belgium	22 October 2018	Queen Consort of the Belgians (2013–present)
115		João Lourenço	born 1954	Angola	22 November 2018	President of Angola (2017–present)
116		Martín Vizcarra	born 1963	Peru	25 February 2019	President of Peru (2018–2020)
117		Kersti Kaljulaid	born 1969	Estonia	16 April 2019	President of Estonia (2016–2021)
118		Mario Draghi	born 1947	Italy	19 June 2019	President of the European Central Bank (2011–2019); Prime Minister of Italy (2021–2022)
119		Borut Pahor	born 1963	Slovenia	31 May 2021	President of Slovenia (2012–2022)
120		Angela Merkel	born 1954	Germany	9 December 2021	Chancellor of Germany (2005–2021)
121		Katerina Sakellaropoulou	born 1956	Greece	27 March 2022	President of Greece (2020–2025)
122		Carlos Vila Nova	born 1959	São Tomé and Príncipe	5 April 2022	President of São Tomé and Príncipe (2021–present)
123		Rumen Radev	born 1963	Bulgaria	12 April 2022	President of Bulgaria (2017–present)
124		Francisco Guterres	born 1954	East Timor	19 May 2022	President of East Timor (2017–2022)
125		Iván Duque	born 1946	Colombia	26 June 2022	President of Colombia (2018–2022)
126		Uhuru Kenyatta	born 1961	Kenya	28 June 2022	President of Kenya (2013–2022)
127		Muhammadu Buhari	1942–2025	Nigeria	30 June 2022	President of Nigeria (1983–1985; 2015–2023)
128		Aníbal Cavaco Silva	born 1939	Portugal	5 July 2022	President of Portugal (2006–2016)
129		José Maria Neves	born 1960	Cape Verde	28 July 2022	President of Cape Verde (2021–present)
130		Nicos Anastasiades	born 1946	Cyprus	7 October 2022	President of Cyprus (2013–2023)
131		Albert II	born 1958	Monaco	14 October 2022	Prince of Monaco (2005–present)
132		Vítor Constâncio	born 1943	Portugal	27 October 2022	Vice President of the European Central Bank (2010–2018)
133		Katalin Novák	born 1977	Hungary	23 February 2023	President of Hungary (2022–2024)
134		Luis Abinader	born 1967	Dominican Republic	23 March 2023	President of the Dominican Republic (2020–present)
135		Egils Levits	born 1955	Latvia	12 April 2023	President of Latvia (2019–2023)
136		Abdelmadjid Tebboune	born 1945	Algeria	23 May 2023	President of Algeria (2019–present)
137		Miguel Díaz-Canel	born 1960	Cuba	14 July 2023	President of Cuba (2019–present)
138		Nana Akufo-Addo	born 1944	Ghana	18 July 2023	President of Ghana (2017–2025)
139		Andrzej Duda	born 1972	Poland	22 August 2023	President of Poland (2015–2025)
140		Maia Sandu	born 1972	Moldova	3 October 2023	President of Moldova (2020–present)
141		Umaro Sissoco Embaló	born 1972	Guinea-Bissau	24 October 2023	President of Guinea-Bissau (2020–2025)
142		Prithvirajsing Roopun	born 1959	Mauritius	15 July 2024	President of Mauritius (2019–2024)
143		Joan Enric Vives i Sicília	born 1949	Andorra	14 October 2024	Co-Prince of Andorra (2003–2025)
144		Alar Karis	born 1958	Estonia	15 January 2025	President of Estonia (2021–present)
145		Nataša Pirc Musar	born 1968	Slovenia	18 February 2025	President of Slovenia (2022–present)
146		Peter Pellegrini	born 1975	Slovakia	26 November 2025	President of Slovakia (2024–present)

== See also ==
- List of recipients of the Grand Cross of the Order of Prince Henry
