= List of ambassadors of Spain to Angola =

Ambassador of Spain to Angola
- Coat of arms of Spain
- Incumbent; Miguel Utray Delgado since 30 September 2026
- Ministry of Foreign Affairs; Secretariat of State for Foreign Affairs
- Style: The Most Excellent
- Residence: Luanda
- Nominator: The Foreign Minister
- Appointer: The Monarch
- Term length: At the government's pleasure
- Inaugural holder: Emilio Cassinello
- Formation: 1977
- Website: Mission of Spain to Angola

The ambassador of Spain to Angola is the official representative of the Kingdom of Spain to the Republic of Angola.

Angola and Spain established diplomatic relations on 19 October 1977 with a bilateral agreement signed at the United Nations headquarters by ambassadors Elísio de Figueiredo and Jaime de Piniés. Spain established a resident embassy in Luanda that same month and appointed the first ambassador, Emilio Cassinello, in early 1979.

In the past, the ambassador to Angola was also accredited to São Tomé and Príncipe (1982–1995).

== List of ambassadors ==
Ambassador		Term	Nominated by	Appointed by	Accredited to
1	Emilio Cassinello	6 February 1979 – 13 January 1981 (1 year, 342 days)	The Marquess of Oreja	Juan Carlos I	Agostinho Neto
2	Manuel Piñeiro Souto (Note: Accredited to São Tomé and Príncipe.)	10 September 1981 – 17 November 1984 (3 years, 68 days)	José Pedro Pérez-Llorca	Juan Carlos I	José Eduardo dos Santos
3	Miguel Ángel Fernández-Mazarambroz Bernabéu	2 January 1985 – 6 February 1988 (3 years, 35 days)	Fernando Morán	Juan Carlos I	José Eduardo dos Santos
4	Antonio Sánchez Jara	28 May 1988 – 22 July 1992 (4 years, 55 days)	Francisco Fernández Ordóñez	Juan Carlos I	José Eduardo dos Santos
5	José Luis Roselló Serra	22 July 1992 – 13 September 1996 (4 years, 53 days)	Javier Solana	Juan Carlos I	José Eduardo dos Santos
6	Rafael Fernández-Pita González	21 September 1996 – 7 June 1997 (259 days)	Abel Matutes	Juan Carlos I	José Eduardo dos Santos
7	Álvaro Iranzo Gutiérrez	7 June 1997 – 21 July 2001 (4 years, 44 days)	Abel Matutes	Juan Carlos I	José Eduardo dos Santos
8	Manuel Pradas Romaní	21 July 2001 – 27 September 2005 (4 years, 68 days)	Josep Piqué	Juan Carlos I	José Eduardo dos Santos
9	Francisco Javier Vallaure de Acha	27 September 2005 – 28 June 2008 (2 years, 275 days)	Miguel Ángel Moratinos	Juan Carlos I	José Eduardo dos Santos
10	José María Castroviejo y Bolíbar	17 January 2009 – 30 June 2012 (3 years, 165 days)	Miguel Ángel Moratinos	Juan Carlos I	José Eduardo dos Santos
11	Julia Alicia Olmo y Romero	30 June 2012 – 4 July 2017 (5 years, 4 days)	José Manuel García-Margallo	Juan Carlos I	José Eduardo dos Santos
12	Manuel Hernández Ruigómez	4 July 2017 – 17 November 2021 (4 years, 136 days)	Alfonso Dastis	Felipe VI	João Lourenço
13	Manuel María Lejarreta	17 November 2021 – 30 September 2026 (4 years, 317 days)	José Manuel Albares	Felipe VI	João Lourenço
14	Miguel Utray Delgado	30 September 2026 – present (0 days)	José Manuel Albares	Felipe VI	João Lourenço

== See also ==
- Angola–Spain relations
