= Order of Prince Henry =

State civil order of Portugal

Order of Prince Henry Ordem do Infante Dom Henrique
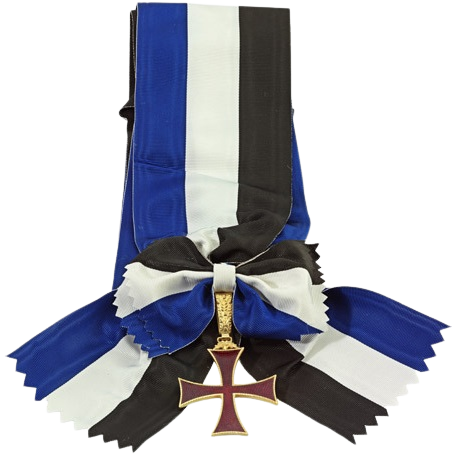
- Sash and badge of the Grand Cross of the order

Awarded by the Portuguese Republic
- Type: Order
- Established: 1960
- Motto: Talant de bien faire
- Eligibility: Portuguese and foreigners; military and civilian
- Criteria: exceptional and outstanding merit for Portugal and its culture
- Grand Master: President of Portugal
- Chancellor: José Nunes Liberato
- Grades: Grand Collar; Grand Cross; Grand Officer; Commander; Officer; Member

Precedence
- Next (higher): Order of Saint James of the Sword
- Next (lower): Order of Liberty
- Ribbon of the Order of Prince Henry

The Order of Prince Henry (Portuguese: Ordem do Infante Dom Henrique) is a Portuguese order of knighthood created on 2 June 1960, to commemorate the quincentenary of the death of the Portuguese infante Prince Henry the Navigator, one of the main initiators of the Age of Discovery. Minor reforms of the constitution of the Order occurred in 1962 and 1980.

It is a five-tier order, whose titles are awarded for relevant services to Portugal and for services in the expansion of the Portuguese culture, its history and its values (with a particular focus on its maritime history). The number of members in each grade is restricted by its constitution, and titles are conferred by special decree by the Grand Master of the Order, i.e., the President of Portugal.

== Grades ==
The order includes several classes; in decreasing order of seniority, these are:

- Grand Collar (Grande-Colar – GColIH)
- Grand Cross (Grã-Cruz – GCIH)
- Grand Officer (Grande-Oficial – GOIH)
- Commander (Comendador – ComIH)
- Officer (Oficial – OIH)
- Knight/Dame (Cavaleiro – CvIH / Dama – DmIH)

There is also a Silver Medal (Medalha de Prata – MedPIH) and a Gold Medal (Medalha de Ouro – MedOIH).

The special distinction of Grand Collar can be awarded only to heads of state.

Ribbons and medals are characterized by equal stripes of blue, white and black (either horizontal or vertical) and a ruby-enameled golden cross pattée. The stars of Grand Officer and Grand Cross bear the inscription "Talant de bien faire".

Membership to the Order is conferred by the President, either on his own initiative, upon the recommendation of his Ministers or following nomination by the Council of the Order.

== See also ==
- List of recipients of the Grand Collar of the Order of Prince Henry
- List of recipients of the Grand Cross of the Order of Prince Henry
