= Julien Davignon =

Belgian politician (1854–1916)

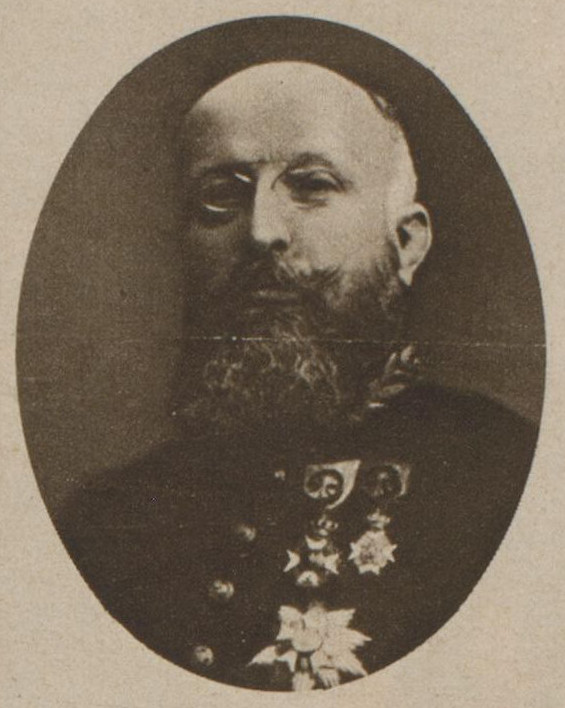

Henri François Julien Claude, Viscount Davignon (French pronunciation: [ʒyljɛ̃ daviɲɔ̃]; 3 December 1854 – 12 March 1916) was a Belgian politician who served as Minister of Foreign Affairs (1907–1916).

Born in Saint-Josse-ten-Noode, Davignon was a member of the Catholic Party. He was first elected to the Belgian Senate in 1898. In 1900 he was elected to the Chamber of Representatives of which he remained a member until his death. In 1907 he became Minister of Foreign Affairs in the government led by Jules de Trooz (1907), a post he kept in the following governments of Frans Schollaert (1907–1911) and Charles de Broqueville (1911–1916). In this function at the start of the First World War he received the German ultimatum, demanding free passage through Belgium.

In January 1916 Davignon left the Foreign Office and became Minister without portfolio until his death in Nice on 12 March 1916. The day before his death he was ennobled a hereditary viscount in the Belgian nobility.

His grandson, Étienne, served as vice-president of the European Commission.
