= Sergio Corrêa da Costa =

Brazilian diplomat and writer

Sergio Corrêa da Costa was a Brazilian diplomat and writer. He was born in Rio de Janeiro on February 19, 1919, the son of Israel Affonso da Costa and Lavínia Corrêa da Costa. He died in the same city on September 29, 2005.

He obtained his bachelor's degree from the National Faculty of Law of the University of Brazil (1942) and studied at the Escola Superior de Guerra (1951), before pursuing graduate studies at UCLA (1948-1950). In a diplomatic career that lasted nearly fifty years, he held many important positions, including that of ambassador to Canada, the UK and finally the United States (1983–86).

He also published several books. One of the best known is Every Inch a King - A Biography of Dom Pedro I, First Emperor of Brazil which was translated into English by Samuel Putnam.

Da Costa was the eighth occupant of Chair No. 7 of the Brazilian Academy of Letters, to which he was elected on August 25, 1983, in succession to Dinah Silveira de Queiroz. He was received on June 14, 1984 by Academician Afrânio Coutinho. In turn, he received the academic Evanildo Bechara.
