= Emilio Cassinello =

Spanish professor and diplomat

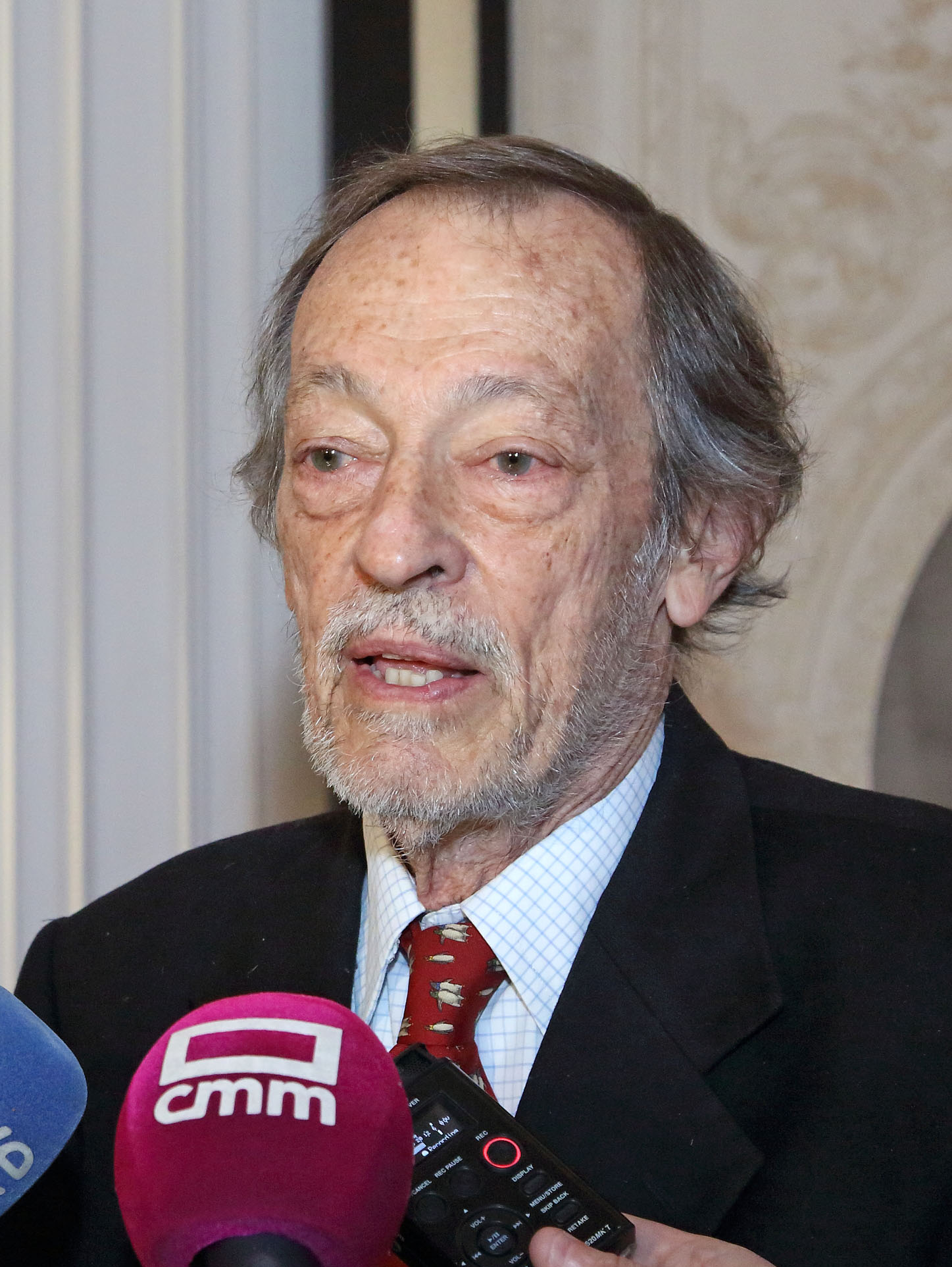
Emilio Cassinello in 2019

Emilio Cassinello (born 1936) is a Spanish former professor and career diplomat.

Cassinello holds law degrees from the Universidad Autónoma de México and Universidad Complutense de Madrid and a Master in Laws from Harvard University. He was an assistant professor at the Universidad Autónoma de México, and at the Universidad de Madrid (1961-1963). He serves as the Director General of the nonprofit Toledo International Centre for Peace (CITpax).

Cassinello has held several posts in Spain's foreign service, including Ambassador to Angola (1978–79) and Mexico (1982–85). He also served as Consul General in New York (1998-2003).
