= Itinera Institute =

Belgian think tank

The Itinera Institute is a Brussels-based independent think-tank that undertakes research that “identifies and promotes roads for policy reform towards sustained economic growth and social protection, for Belgium and its regions.” It was founded in 2006 by Professor Marc De Vos.

== Scholars ==
As of mid-2009, Itinera Institute resident scholars include Marc De Vos (Director), Ivan Van de Cloot, Johan Albrecht, Jean Hindriks and François Daue. Many other experts and specialists collaborate regularly on Itinera’s reports and publications.

== Themes & Publications ==
Itinera has nine main research programs including:

- Ageing and Pensions
- Economy
- Education & Innovation
- Employment
- Energy & Environment
- Government & Taxation
- Healthcare
- Migration & Integration
- Poverty & Inequality

Some important reports have been published on those fields such as “The future of healthcare: Diagnostic and remedies”, “From job security to employment security on the Belgian labour market” and “Beyond Copernicus: From confusion to consensus?”

Next to the reports, Itinera regularly published short papers on Belgian economic and social challenges.

== Criticisms ==
Itinera calls itself a fully independent institute, not financed by political parties, lobby groups or government bodies, and claims its only revenue sources come from private donators, but critics have questioned these claims of independence made by Itinera. Dirk Van der Maelen notes that the formation of the organisation was funded by leaders of the business community, who have connections to Open VLD and LDD; and gives explicit mention to Luc Verelst, Bart Verhaeghe, Christian Leysen and Nicolas Saverys, According to Van der Maelen, Itinera has not come forward to answer questions regarding financing since their foundation. Political philosopher Thomas Decreus has called Itinera "a neo-liberal lobby group with political ambitions".
