= Pentti Talvitie =

Finnish diplomat and ambassador

Pentti Talvitie (March 1, 1922 Helsinki – September 14, 2003 Helsinki) was a Finnish diplomat and ambassador.

He was Bachelor of Political Science. He was an ambassador from 1970 to 1975 in Brussels, Secretary of State for Foreign Affairs in 1975–1977, Ambassador in Bonn from 1977 to 1979, in Lisbon from 1979 to 1984 and in Mexico City 1984 and 1985 again in Brussels from where he retired.
