= Cesidio Guazzaroni =

Italian diplomat

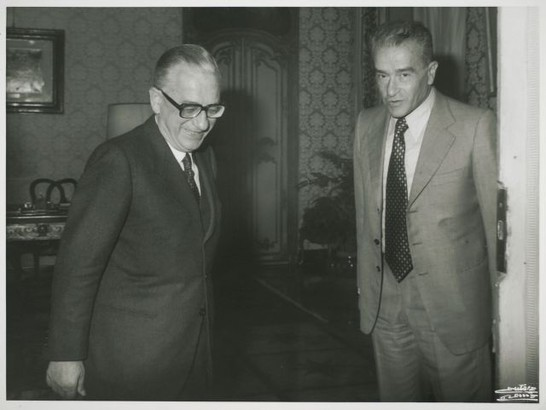
- Ambassador Guazzaroni visits the President of the Chamber Pietro Ingrao

Commissioner for Industry and Technology
- In office 13 July 1976 – 5 January 1977
- President: François-Xavier Ortoli
- Preceded by: Altiero Spinelli
- Succeeded by: Position abolished

Personal details
- Born: 5 January 1911; Loreto Aprutino, Italy
- Died: 2 October 2004 (aged 93); Rome, Italy
- Political party: Italian Republican Party

Cesidio Guazzaroni (5 January 1911 in Loreto Aprutino – 2 October 2004 in Rome) was an Italian diplomat who served as a European Commissioner from 1976 to 1977.

When Altiero Spinelli resigned from the Ortoli Commission in 1976, Guazzaroni was appointed to replace him as Commissioner for Industry and Technology. He held office from 1976 to 6 January 1977.

He later served as the Italian ambassador to Switzerland.

== Honors ==
Order of Merit of the Italian Republic 1st Class / Knight Grand Cross – 2 June 1975

== See also ==
- Ministry of Foreign Affairs (Italy)
- Foreign relations of Italy
