= Marcos Azambuja =

Brazilian diplomat (1935–2025)

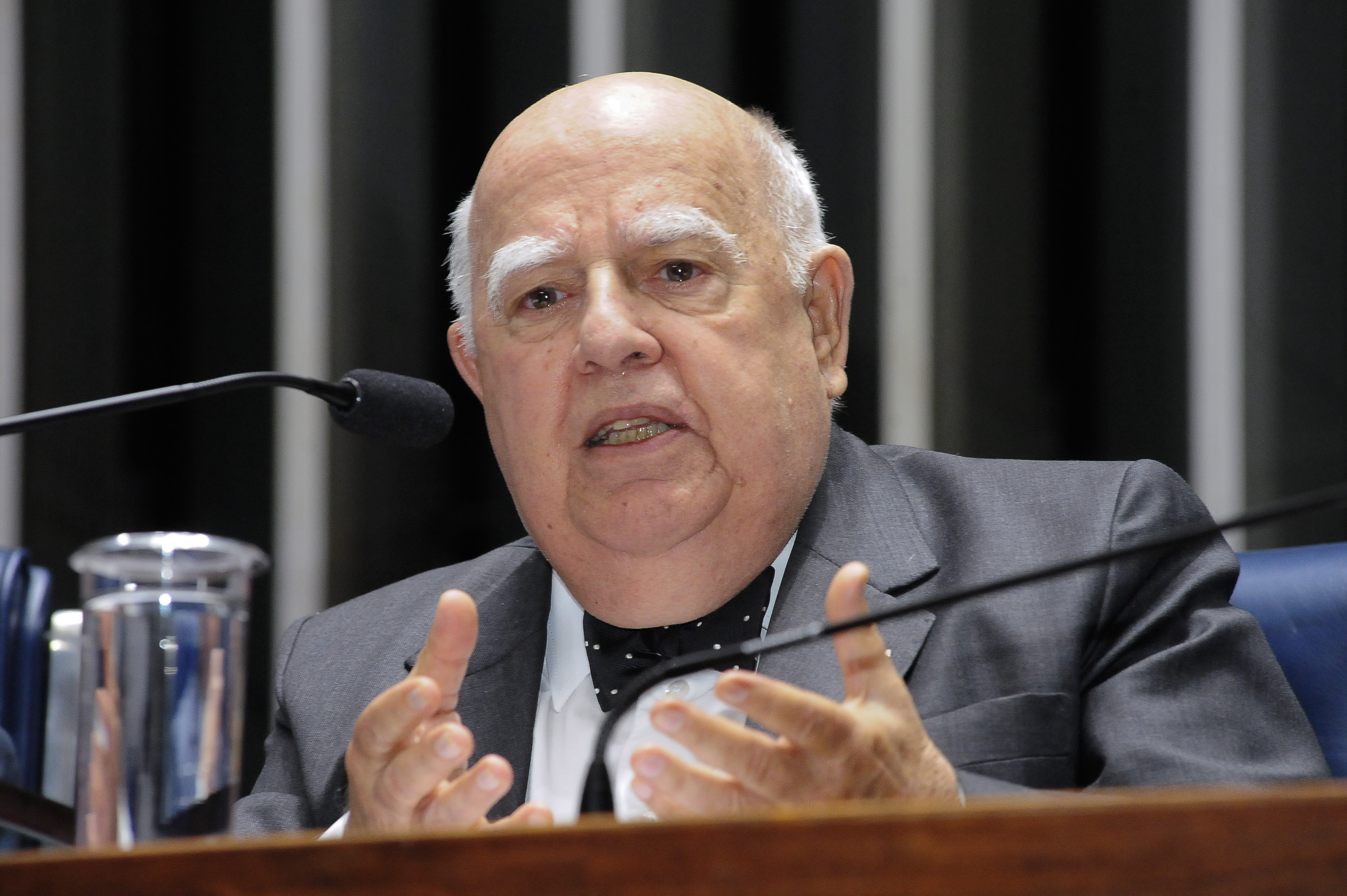
- Azambuja in 2017
- Born: February 9, 1935; Rio de Janeiro, Brazil
- Died: May 28, 2025 (aged 90); Rio de Janeiro, Brazil
- Occupation: Diplomat

Marcos Castrioto de Azambuja (February 9, 1935 – May 28, 2025) was a Brazilian diplomat.

== Life and career ==
Azambuja was Brazil's ambassador to France (1997–2003) and Argentina (1992–1997), Secretary-General of Itamaraty (1990–1992), Coordinator of the Rio 92 Conference, and Head of the Brazilian Delegation for Disarmament and Human Rights Affairs, in Geneva (1989–1990).

He was vice-president of the Brazilian Center for International Relations (CEBRI), Member of the Brazilian Historical and Geographic Institute (IHGB), of the Board of Trustees of the Botanical Garden of Rio de Janeiro, Member of the Council of the Institute of National Historical and Artistic Heritage (IPHAN), and of the International Conjuncture Analysis Group of the University of São Paulo.

Azambuja died in Rio de Janeiro on May 28, 2025, at the age of 90.
