= Foreign relations of South Sudan =

The Republic of South Sudan established relations with sovereign states and international organizations following independence on 9 July 2011, including the African Union and United Nations. South Sudan's former ruling country of Sudan was the first state in the world to recognize South Sudan.

== Foreign policy ==
In the immediate aftermath of the country's independence, South Sudan's foreign policy prerogative was seen as a challenge in the quest to balance relations between the West, other African states and the Arab states. Since independence, South Sudan has sought to shed its reliance on Sudan, reportedly planning to introduce the Swahili language and orient itself toward East Africa.

== Diplomatic relations ==
Sudan was the first country to recognise the independence of South Sudan on 8 July 2011, one day prior to independence. Four other states followed suit on 8 July. Over 25 countries had recognised the country on 9 July, including all permanent members of the United Nations Security Council.

On 14 July 2011, South Sudan was admitted as a member of the United Nations without a vote or objections raised by its members.

List of countries which South Sudan maintains diplomatic relations with:

#	Country	Date
1	Sudan	9 July 2011
2	Egypt	9 July 2011
3	Germany	9 July 2011
4	Kenya	9 July 2011
5	Botswana	9 July 2011
6	Brazil	9 July 2011
7	China	9 July 2011
8	France	9 July 2011
9	Japan	9 July 2011
10	Norway	9 July 2011
—	Sahrawi Arab Democratic Republic	9 July 2011
11	South Korea	9 July 2011
12	United Kingdom	9 July 2011
13	Sweden	9 July 2011
14	United States	9 July 2011
15	Cuba	10 July 2011
16	Eritrea	11 July 2011
17	Namibia	12 July 2011
18	Mozambique	15 July 2011
19	Cambodia	22 July 2011
20	Israel	28 July 2011
21	Russia	22 August 2011
22	Netherlands	9 September 2011
23	Austria	21 September 2011
24	Spain	21 September 2011
25	South Africa	22 September 2011
26	Hungary	23 September 2011
27	Slovenia	23 September 2011
28	Australia	24 September 2011
29	Malawi	26 September 2011
30	Mexico	26 September 2011
31	Iceland	29 September 2011
32	Timor-Leste	13 October 2011
33	Turkey	13 October 2011
34	Belgium	14 October 2011
35	North Korea	18 November 2011
36	Montenegro	21 November 2011
37	Slovakia	12 December 2011
38	Mongolia	20 December 2011
39	Canada	22 December 2011
40	Luxembourg	22 December 2011
41	Serbia	3 January 2012
42	Djibouti	11 February 2012
43	Bangladesh	16 February 2012
44	Ethiopia	27 February 2012
45	India	13 March 2012
46	Denmark	4 May 2012
47	Ireland	4 May 2012
48	Zimbabwe	4 May 2012
49	Somalia	18 May 2012
50	Italy	23 May 2012
51	Switzerland	23 May 2012
52	Pakistan	4 June 2012
53	Georgia	15 June 2012
54	Finland	22 July 2012
55	Turkmenistan	17 August 2012
56	Uganda	3 September 2012
57	Ukraine	25 September 2012
58	Bahrain	28 September 2012
59	Bulgaria	28 September 2012
60	Fiji	5 October 2012
61	Nigeria	17 October 2012
62	Azerbaijan	23 October 2012
63	Central African Republic	21 November 2012
64	Burundi	28 November 2012
65	Czech Republic	December 2012
66	Benin	30 January 2013
67	Poland	31 January 2013
68	Kuwait	12 February 2013
—	Holy See	22 February 2013
69	Democratic Republic of the Congo	4 March 2013
70	Philippines	13 March 2013
71	Romania	17 April 2013
72	Portugal	23 April 2013
73	Oman	11 June 2013
74	Seychelles	24 July 2013
75	Belarus	4 September 2013
76	Sri Lanka	25 September 2013
77	Rwanda	21 October 2013
78	Saudi Arabia	3 December 2013
79	Thailand	12 December 2013
80	Ghana	15 September 2014
—	Sovereign Military Order of Malta	12 November 2014
—	State of Palestine	24 January 2015
81	Jordan	1 March 2015
82	Ecuador	8 May 2015
85	Tunisia	26 June 2015
86	Algeria	9 September 2015
87	Equatorial Guinea	8 October 2015
88	Zambia	16 February 2016
89	Tanzania	13 April 2016
90	Angola	10 June 2016
91	United Arab Emirates	23 June 2016
92	Mauritania	3 July 2017
93	Estonia	18 September 2017
94	Venezuela	22 September 2017
95	Comoros	17 May 2018
96	Vietnam	21 February 2019
97	Nicaragua	22 July 2019
98	Morocco	25 August 2020
99	Qatar	10 September 2020
100	Lebanon	8 December 2020
101	Latvia	23 September 2021
102	Cyprus	24 September 2021
103	Bosnia and Herzegovina	27 October 2021
104	Croatia	16 November 2021
105	Nepal	28 March 2022
106	Senegal	19 July 2022
107	Indonesia	20 September 2022
108	Dominican Republic	11 April 2023
109	Maldives	4 May 2023
110	Niger	19 July 2023
111	Greece	20 March 2024
112	Libya	20 March 2024
113	Malaysia	20 March 2024
114	Ivory Coast	21 November 2024
115	Gambia	24 September 2025
116	Belize	25 September 2025
117	Kyrgyzstan	25 September 2025
118	Kazakhstan	12 December 2025
119	Armenia	19 August 2026
120	Singapore	27 August 2026
121	Liberia	Unknown

== Representation in South Sudan ==
The United States upgraded its Juba consulate to an embassy on 9 July 2011, as did France. Also Sudan has announced that it plans to open an embassy in Juba, upon independence, while Egypt has announced it intends to convert its existing consulate in Juba into a full embassy. The United Kingdom has opened an embassy in South Sudan, as well.

On 16 September 2011, the ambassadors of the United Kingdom and Norway presented their credentials, the first to do so. Credentials were presented on 15 November of that year by Chinese, German and Kenyan ambassadors.

=== International organisations ===
South Sudan became a member of the United Nations on 13 July 2011. It joined the African Union on 27 July 2011. It is also a member of: the Inter-Parliamentary Union (IPU), the International Criminal Police Organization (Interpol), the International Development Association (IDA), the International Federation of Red Cross and Red Crescent Societies (IFRCS), the International Fund for Agricultural Development (IFAD), and the International Organization for Migration (IOM).

South Sudan has also either applied or is in the process of applying to the Common Market for Eastern and Southern Africa, the Commonwealth of Nations, the East African Community, the Intergovernmental Authority on Development, the International Monetary Fund, and the World Bank. South Sudan has also been assured membership in the Arab League, should it decide to pursue membership, though it could also opt for observer status. it may also seek membership in the Organisation of Islamic Cooperation, which has expressed interest in giving South Sudan admission despite not being a majority Muslim state.

On 24 July 2011, President Salva Kiir told the Speaker of the East African Legislative Assembly that he hoped the EAC will consider expediting South Sudan's accession to the supranational organisation. South Sudan is considered very likely to join the EAC, but an exact timetable for admission had not yet been mooted publicly.

South Sudan is an observer state of the Non-Aligned Movement.

International organisation	Status
East African Community (EAC)	South Sudan joined the EAC on 5 September 2016.
International Olympic Committee (IOC)	As there was not enough time to create a new National Olympic Committee, a South Sudanese marathon runner competed as an Independent Olympian at the 2012 Summer Olympics. On 7 November 2015, South Sudan became the 206th IOC Member State. The South Sudan National Olympic Committee was founded in 2015.
United Nations (UN)	On 14 July, South Sudan became the 193rd UN Member State.
FIFA	On 25 May 2012, South Sudan became the 209th member of FIFA.

== Africa ==
=== Comoros ===
First ambassador of South Sudan to Comoros presented his credentials to Comoros in 2018.

=== Egypt ===
Essam Sharaf, Prime Minister of Egypt after the Arab Spring-inspired revolution in 2011 made his first foreign visit to Khartoum and Juba in the lead-up to South Sudan's secession. Egypt was one of four countries to recognise South Sudan as an independent state on the first day.

=== Sudan ===
Since independence relations with Sudan have been under negotiation. Sudan's then President Omar al-Bashir first announced, in January 2011, that dual citizenship in the North and the South would be allowed, but upon the independence of South Sudan he retracted the offer. He has also suggested an EU-style confederation. In February 2012, an agreement was reached by which citizens of both countries could live, work, and own property in both countries, and freely travel between the two.

== Americas ==
No formal diplomatic relations

Country	Formal relations began	Notes
Argentina	N/A	Argentina recognized South Sudan on 2 August 2011.
Belize	25 September 2025	
Brazil	9 July 2011	Brazil recognized and established diplomatic relations with South Sudan on 9 July 2011.
Canada	22 December 2011	Canada recognized South Sudan on 7 July 2011.; Canada has an embassy in Juba.
Chile	N/A	Chile recognized South Sudan on 7 July 2011.
Colombia	N/A	Colombia recognized South Sudan 16 July 2011.
Cuba	10 July 2011	Cuba recognized South Sudan on 9 July 2011.
Dominican Republic	11 April 2023	
Ecuador	8 May 2015	
Guyana	N/A	Guyana recognized South Sudan on 14 July 2011.
Jamaica	N/A	Jamaica recognized South Sudan on 6 October 2011.
Mexico	26 September 2011	Mexico recognized South Sudan on 14 July 2011.; Mexico is represented in South Sudan through its embassy in Addis Ababa, Ethiopia.
Nicaragua	22 July 2019	
Panama	N/A	Panama recognized South Sudan on 18 August 2011.
Peru	N/A	Peru recognized South Sudan on 14 July 2011.
Suriname	N/A	Suriname recognized South Sudan on 20 July 2011.
United States	9 July 2011	United States recognized and established diplomatic relations with South Sudan on 9 July 2011.; United States has an embassy in Juba.
Uruguay	N/A	Uruguay recognized South Sudan on 13 July 2011.
Venezuela	22 September 2017	Venezuela recognized South Sudan on 26 December 2011.

== Asia ==
No formal diplomatic relations

Country	Formal relations began	Notes
Armenia	19 August 2026	Armenia recognized South Sudan on 9 July 2011.
Azerbaijan	23 October 2012	
Bahrain	28 September 2012	Bahrain recognized South Sudan on 10 July 2011.
Bangladesh	16 February 2012	Bangladesh recognized South Sudan on 20 July 2011.
Cambodia	22 July 2011	Cambodia recognized South Sudan on 9 July 2011.
China	9 July 2011	China recognized and established diplomatic relations with South Sudan on 9 July 2011
Georgia	15 June 2012	
India	13 March 2012	India recognized South Sudan on 9 July 2011 and the consulate was upgraded to an embassy in March 2012
Indonesia	20 September 2022	Indonesia recognized South Sudan on 12 July 2011
Iran	N/A	Iran recognized South Sudan on 16 July 2011.
Israel	28 July 2011	Israel recognized South Sudan on 10 July 2011.
Japan	9 July 2011	Japan recognized and established diplomatic relations with South Sudan on 9 July 2011.
Jordan	1 March 2015	Jordan recognized South Sudan on 9 July 2011.
Kazakhstan	12 December 2025	Kazakhstan recognized South Sudan on 15 July 2011.
Kuwait	12 February 2013	
Kyrgyzstan	25 September 2025	Kyrgyzstan recognized South Sudan on 14 July 2011.
Laos	N/A	Laos recognized South Sudan on 26 December 2011.
Lebanon	8 December 2020	Lebanon recognized South Sudan on 18 July 2011.
Malaysia	20 March 2024	
Maldives	4 May 2023	The Maldives recognized South Sudan on 9 July 2011.
Mongolia	20 December 2011	
Nepal	28 March 2022	
North Korea	18 November 2011	North Korea recognized South Sudan on 15 July 2011.
Oman	11 June 2013	
Pakistan	4 June 2012	Pakistan recognized South Sudan on 22 July 2011.
Philippines	13 March 2013	The Philippines recognized South Sudan on 1 August 2011.
Qatar	10 September 2020	Qatar recognized South Sudan on 9 July 2011
Saudi Arabia	3 December 2013	Saudi Arabia recognized South Sudan on 11 July 2011
Singapore	27 August 2026	Singapore recognized South Sudan on 14 July 2011.
South Korea	9 July 2011	South Korea recognized South Sudan on 9 July 2011
Sri Lanka	25 September 2013	
Thailand	12 December 2013	Thailand recognized South Sudan on 6 September 2011.
Timor-Leste	13 October 2011	
Turkey	13 October 2011	Turkey recognized South Sudan on 9 July 2011.
Turkmenistan	17 August 2012	
United Arab Emirates	23 June 2016	The United Arab Emirates recognized South Sudan on 11 July 2011.
Vietnam	21 February 2019	Vietnam recognized South Sudan on 10 July 2011.
Yemen	N/A	Yemen recognized South Sudan on 9 October 2011.

=== China ===
China recognizes the independence of South Sudan on 9 July 2011.

=== India ===
India recognized South Sudan on 9 July 2011.

=== Israel ===
Relations between the two states commenced with Israel's recognition of South Sudan a day after its independence and South Sudan announcing the following week its intention to establish full diplomatic relations with Israel. On 28 July 2011, it was announced that full diplomatic ties had been established between the two countries. This was considered a significant boon to Israel, as Sudan did not have diplomatic relations with Israel and did not recognize Israeli sovereignty. This changed under the Israel–Sudan normalization agreement.

Economic ties show the most potential. As of 23 July 2011, several Israeli companies are already in talks for various business deals. Israel is host to thousands of refugees from South Sudan, who are now ready to return to their native country.

=== South Korea ===
The Republic of Korea government is providing for the South Korean military to South Sudan in UN Mission (UNMISS) in South Sudan.

=== Turkey ===
Both countries established diplomatic relations in 2012

- South Sudan has an embassy in Ankara.
- Turkey has an embassy in Juba.
- Trade volume between the two countries was US$3.2 million in 2019.

== Europe ==
=== Denmark ===
First ambassador of South Sudan to Denmark presented his credentials to Denmark in 2016.

=== United Kingdom ===
See South Sudan–United Kingdom relations

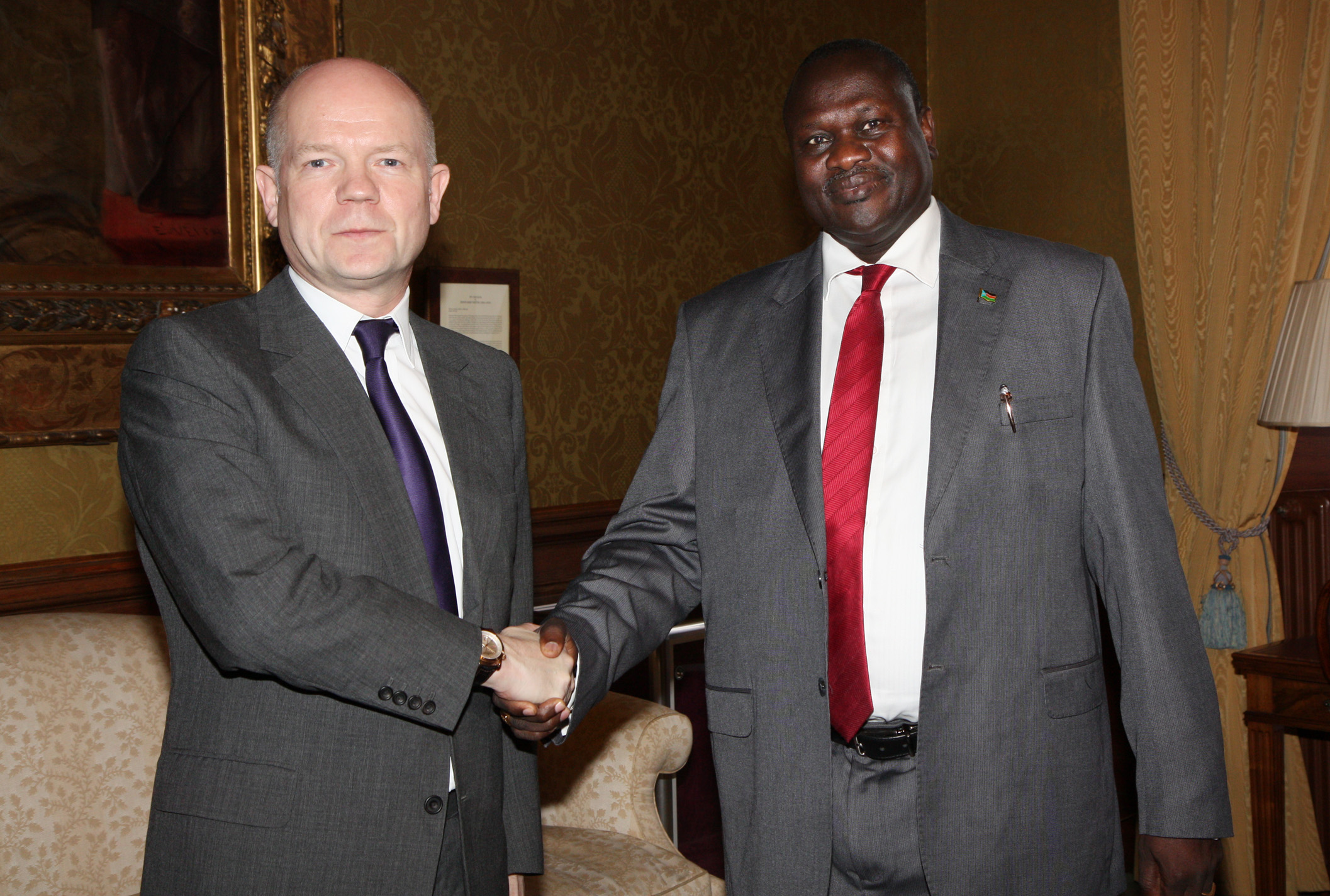
Foreign Secretary William Hague with South Sudanese Vice President Riek Machar in London, January 2013.

South Sudan established diplomatic relations with the United Kingdom on 9 July 2011.

- South Sudan maintains an embassy in London.
- The United Kingdom is accredited to South Sudan through its embassy in Juba.

The UK governed South Sudan from 1899 to 1956, when Sudan achieved full independence.

Bilaterally the two countries have a Development Partnership.

== Oceania ==
Country	Formal relations began	Notes
Australia	24 September 2011	Australia recognized South Sudan on 9 July 2011.; Australia is represented in South Sudan through its embassy in Addis Ababa, Ethiopia.
Fiji	25 September 2012	Fiji is represented in South Sudan through its embassy in Addis Ababa, Ethiopia.
New Zealand	N/A	New Zealand recognized South Sudan on 9 July 2011.
Vanuatu	N/A	Vanuatu recognized South Sudan on 28 September 2011.

== South Sudan and the Commonwealth of Nations ==
See also; South Sudan and the Commonwealth of Nations

== See also ==
- List of diplomatic missions in South Sudan
- List of diplomatic missions of South Sudan
- Moustapha Soumaré
