= List of diplomatic missions in South Sudan =

This is a list of diplomatic missions in South Sudan. The capital city of Juba currently hosts 23 resident embassies.

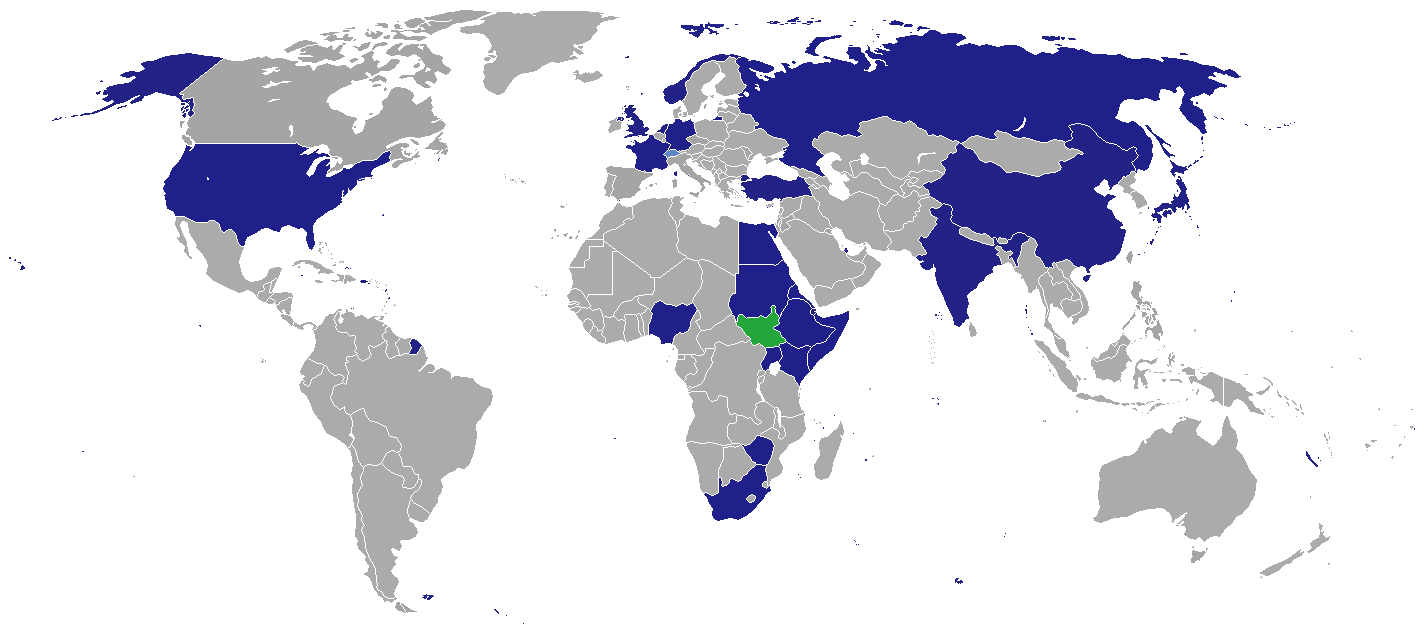
Diplomatic missions in South Sudan

== Embassies in Juba ==
1. China
2. Djibouti
3. Egypt
4. Eritrea
5. Ethiopia
6. France
7. Germany
8. Holy See
9. India
10. Japan
11. Kenya
12. Netherlands
13. Nigeria
14. Norway
15. Russia
16. Somalia
17. South Africa
18. Sudan
19. Turkey
20. Uganda
21. United Kingdom
22. United States
23. Zimbabwe

== Other missions or delegations in Juba ==
- European Union (EUAVSEC South Sudan)
- Somaliland (Representative Office)
- Switzerland (Cooperation Office and Consular Agency)
- United Nations (United Nations Mission in South Sudan – UNMISS)

== Non-resident embassies ==
=== Resident in Addis Ababa ===
1. Australia
2. Austria
3. Benin
4. Brazil
5. Bulgaria
6. Burundi
7. Chile
8. Colombia
9. Cuba
10. Czechia
11. Denmark
12. Eswatini
13. Finland
14. Ghana
15. Greece
16. Iran
17. Ireland
18. Italy
19. Jordan
20. Kuwait
21. Madagascar
22. Malawi
23. Mauritania
24. Mexico
25. Namibia
26. North Korea
27. Poland
28. Portugal
29. Sahrawi Republic
30. Serbia
31. Seychelles
32. Switzerland
33. Togo
34. Ukraine
35. United Arab Emirates
36. Venezuela

=== Resident in Cairo, Egypt ===
1. Cyprus
2. Croatia
3. Guinea
4. Hungary
5. Panama
6. Tajikistan
7. Vietnam

=== Resident in Kampala, Uganda ===
1. Belgium
2. South Korea
3. Rwanda
4. Saudi Arabia

=== Resident in Khartoum, Sudan ===
1. Libya
2. Oman
3. Qatar
4. Romania
5. Spain
6. Sweden

=== Resident in Nairobi, Kenya ===
1. Algeria
2. Botswana
3. Costa Rica
4. Indonesia
5. Malaysia
6. Morocco
7. Philippines
8. Sierra Leone
9. Slovakia
10. Sri Lanka
11. Tanzania
12. Thailand
13. Zambia

=== Resident in Riyadh, Saudi Arabia ===
1. Kyrgyzstan
2. Maldives
3. Turkmenistan
4. Uzbekistan

=== Resident elsewhere ===
1. Argentina (Buenos Aires)
2. Israel (Jerusalem)
3. Laos (New Delhi)
4. Pakistan (Kampala)
5. Palestine (Djibouti City)

== Former Embassies ==
Canada (Juba) (Embassy) (Closed 7 August 2026)

== See also ==
- Foreign relations of South Sudan
- List of diplomatic missions of South Sudan
