= List of diplomatic missions of South Sudan =

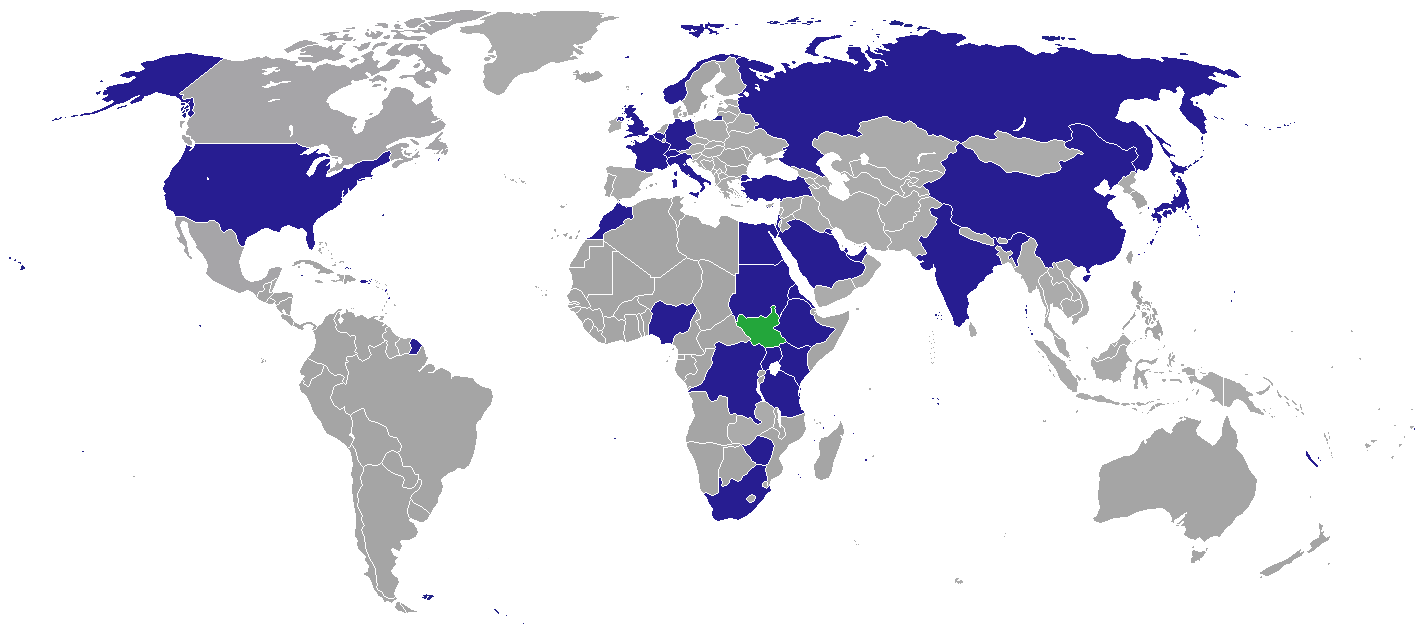
Diplomatic missions of South Sudan

This is a list of diplomatic missions of South Sudan.

Honorary consulates are excluded from this listing.

== Current missions ==
=== Africa ===
Host country	Host city	Mission	Concurrent accreditation	Ref.
Congo-Kinshasa	Kinshasa	Embassy		
Egypt	Cairo	Embassy		
Eritrea	Asmara	Embassy		
Ethiopia	Addis Ababa	Embassy	Countries: Djibouti; International Organizations: African Union; Intergovernmental Authority on Development; United Nations Economic Commission for Africa	
Kenya	Nairobi	Embassy		
Morocco	Rabat	Embassy		
Nigeria	Abuja	Embassy	Countries: Benin; Cameroon; Equatorial Guinea; Gambia; Guinea; Ivory Coast; Mali; Niger; Senegal	
South Africa	Pretoria	Embassy	Countries: Namibia; Seychelles	
Sudan	Khartoum	Embassy		
Tanzania	Dar Es Salaam	Embassy		
Uganda	Kampala	Embassy	Countries: Burundi; Rwanda	
Zimbabwe	Harare	Embassy		

=== Americas ===
Host country	Host city	Mission	Concurrent accreditation	Ref.
United States	Washington, D.C.	Embassy	Countries: Canada	

=== Asia ===
Host country	Host city	Mission	Concurrent accreditation	Ref.
China	Beijing	Embassy	Countries: Australia; Malaysia; South Korea	
India	New Delhi	Embassy	Countries: Sri Lanka	
Israel	Tel Aviv	Embassy		
Japan	Tokyo	Embassy		
Kuwait	Kuwait City	Embassy		
Qatar	Doha	Embassy		
Saudi Arabia	Riyadh	Embassy		
Turkey	Ankara	Embassy		
United Arab Emirates	Abu Dhabi	Embassy		
United Arab Emirates	Dubai	Consulate-General		

=== Europe ===
Host country	Host city	Mission	Concurrent accreditation	Ref.
Belgium	Brussels	Embassy	Countries: Bulgaria; Luxembourg; International Organizations: European Union	
France	Paris	Embassy	Countries: Portugal; Spain	
Germany	Berlin	Embassy	Countries: Austria; Czechia	
Italy	Rome	Embassy	Countries: Greece	
Norway	Oslo	Embassy	Countries: Denmark; Finland; Iceland; Sweden	
Russia	Moscow	Embassy	Countries: Azerbaijan	
United Kingdom	London	Embassy		

=== Multilateral Organizations ===
Organization	Host city	Host country	Mission	Concurrent accreditation	Ref.
United Nations	New York City	United States	Permanent Mission		
United Nations	Geneva	Switzerland	Permanent Mission	Countries: Switzerland	

== Gallery ==
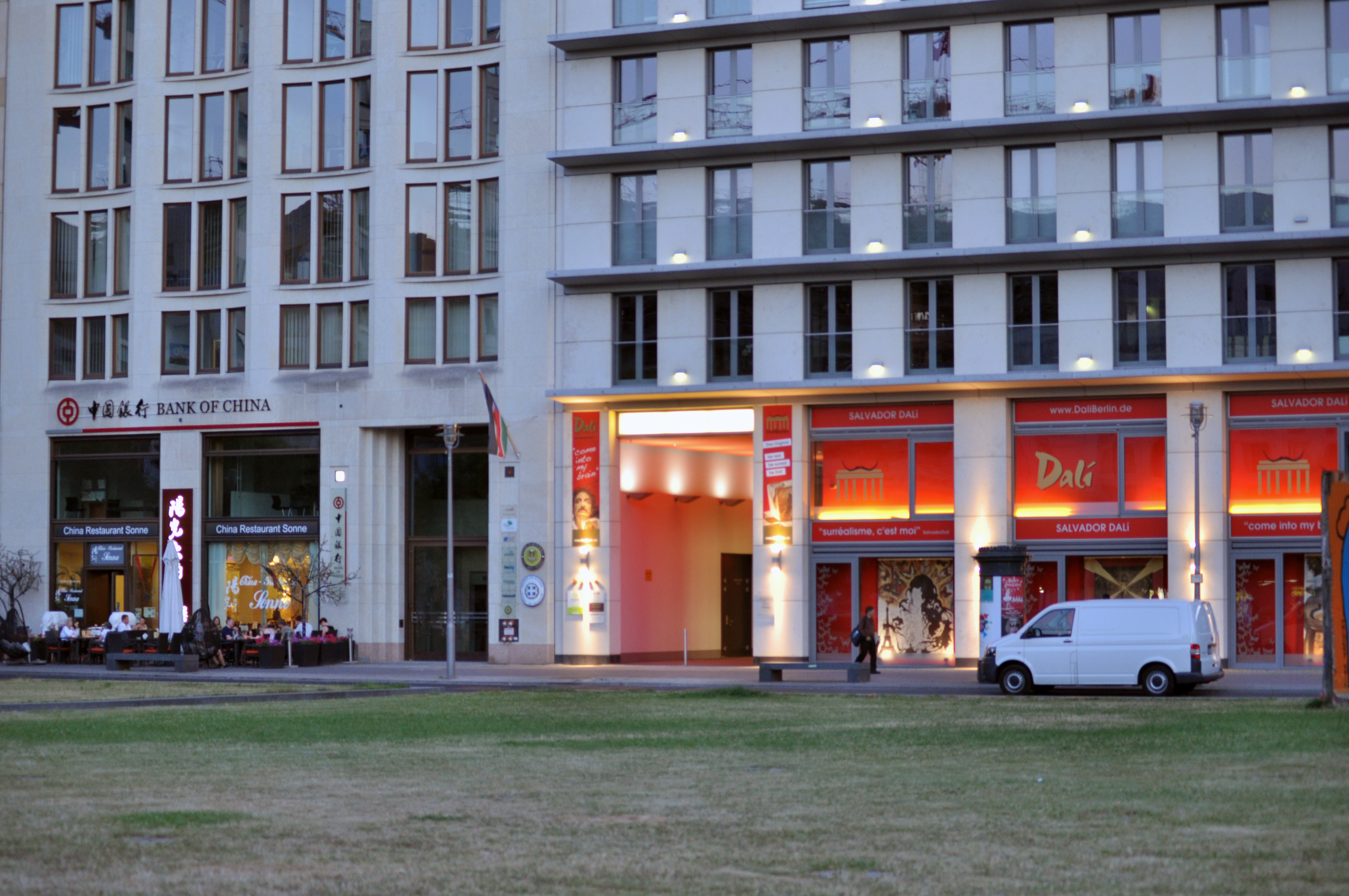
Building hosting the embassy in Berlin

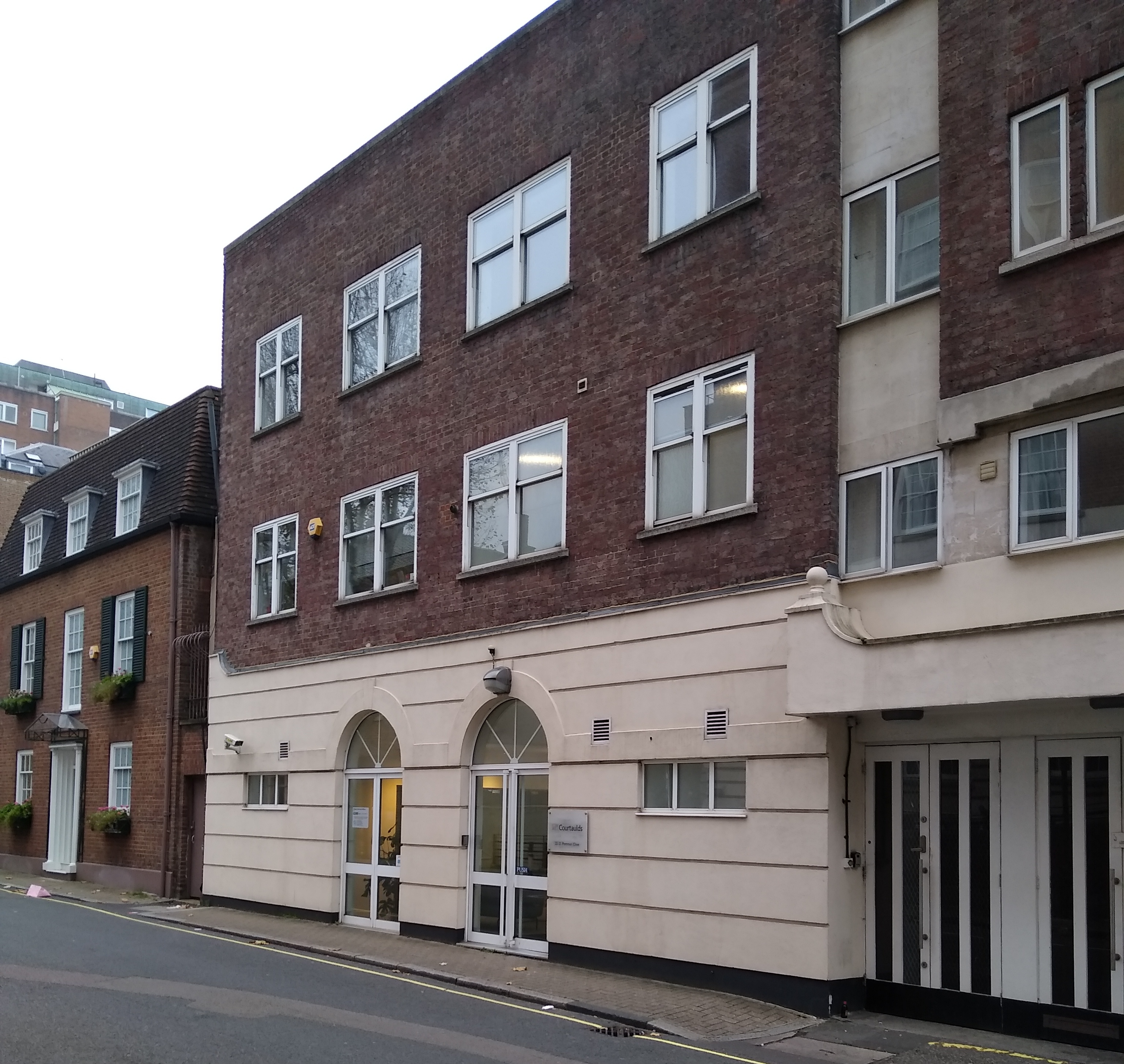
Building hosting the embassy in London

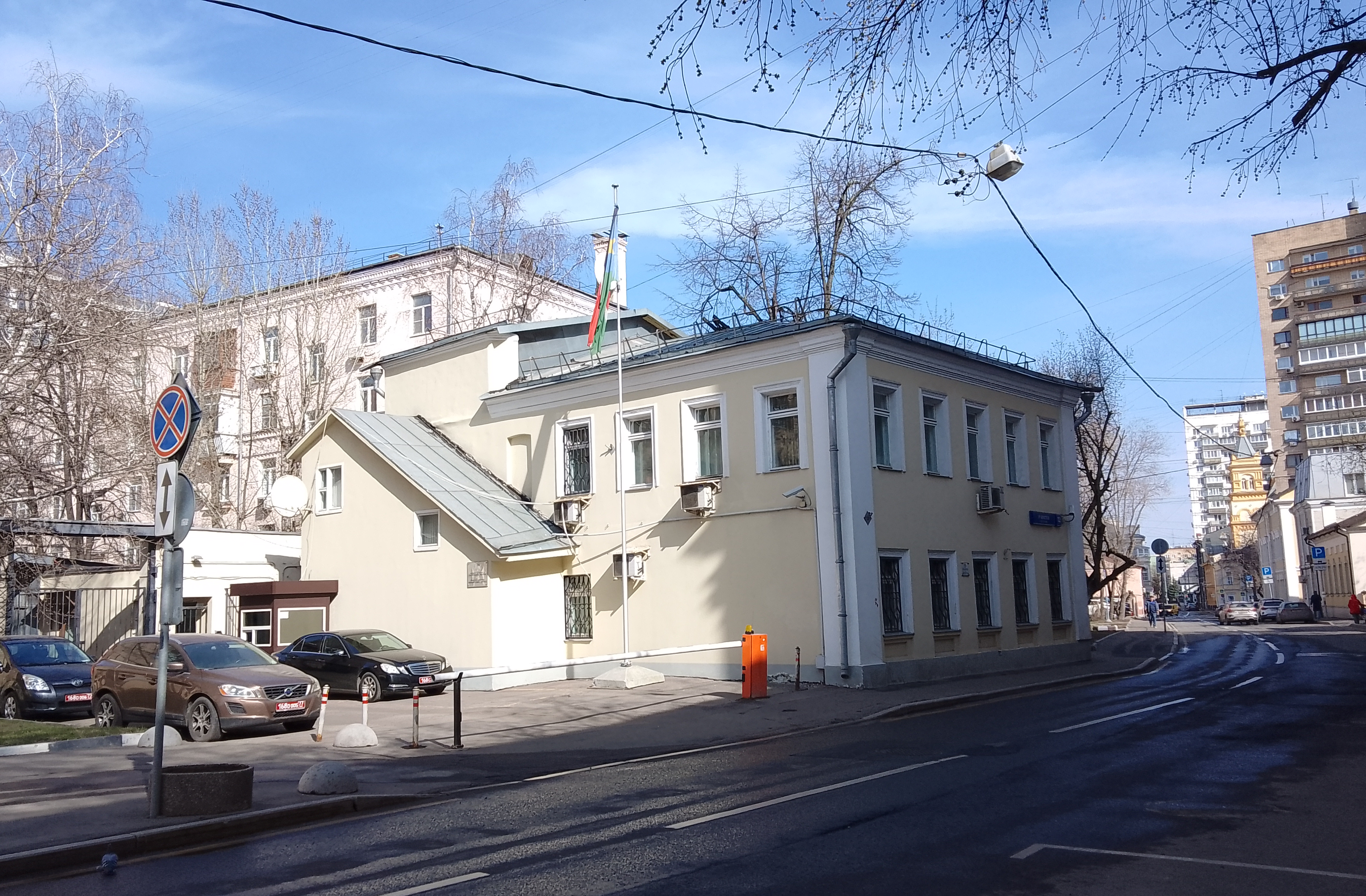
Embassy in Moscow

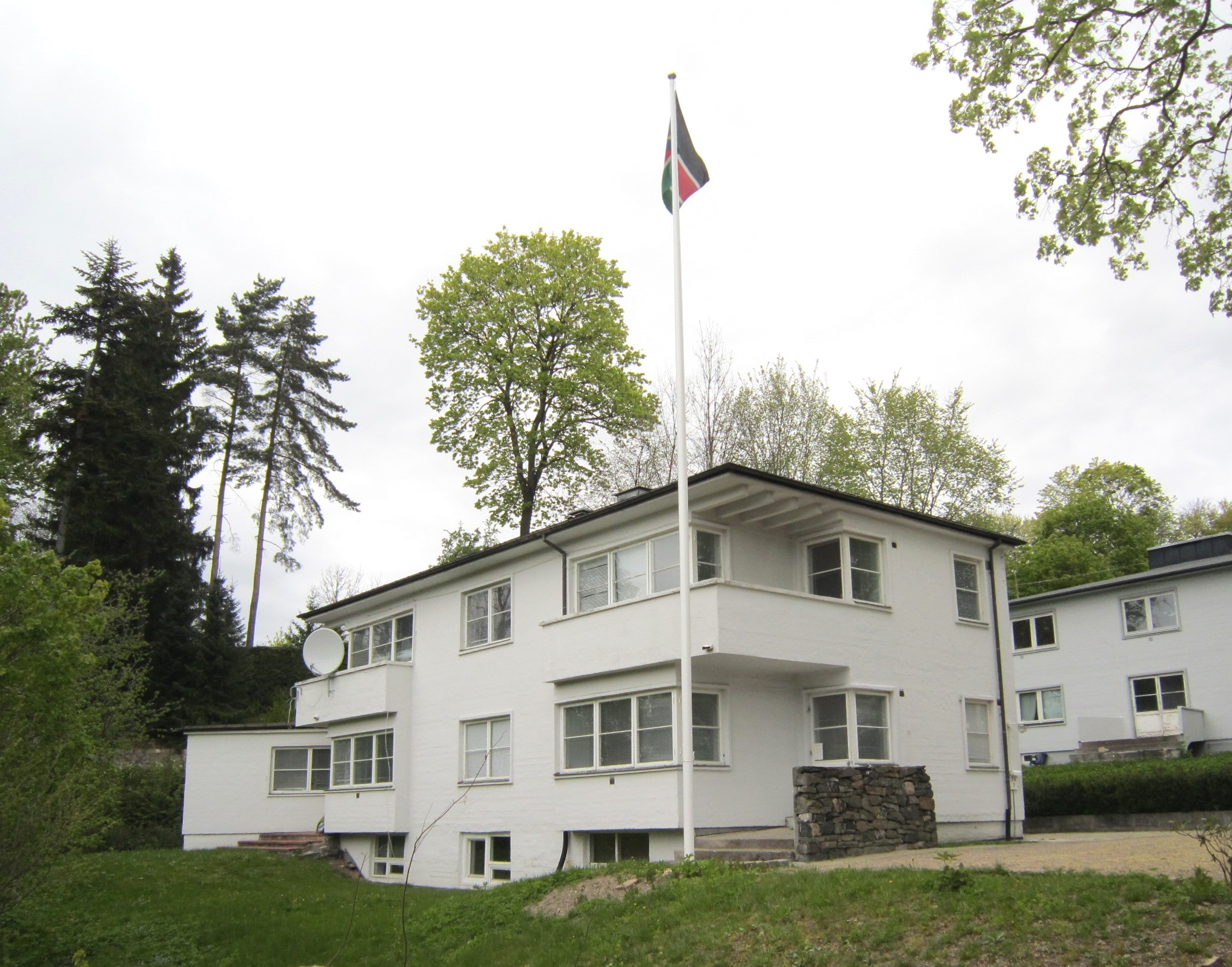
Embassy in Oslo

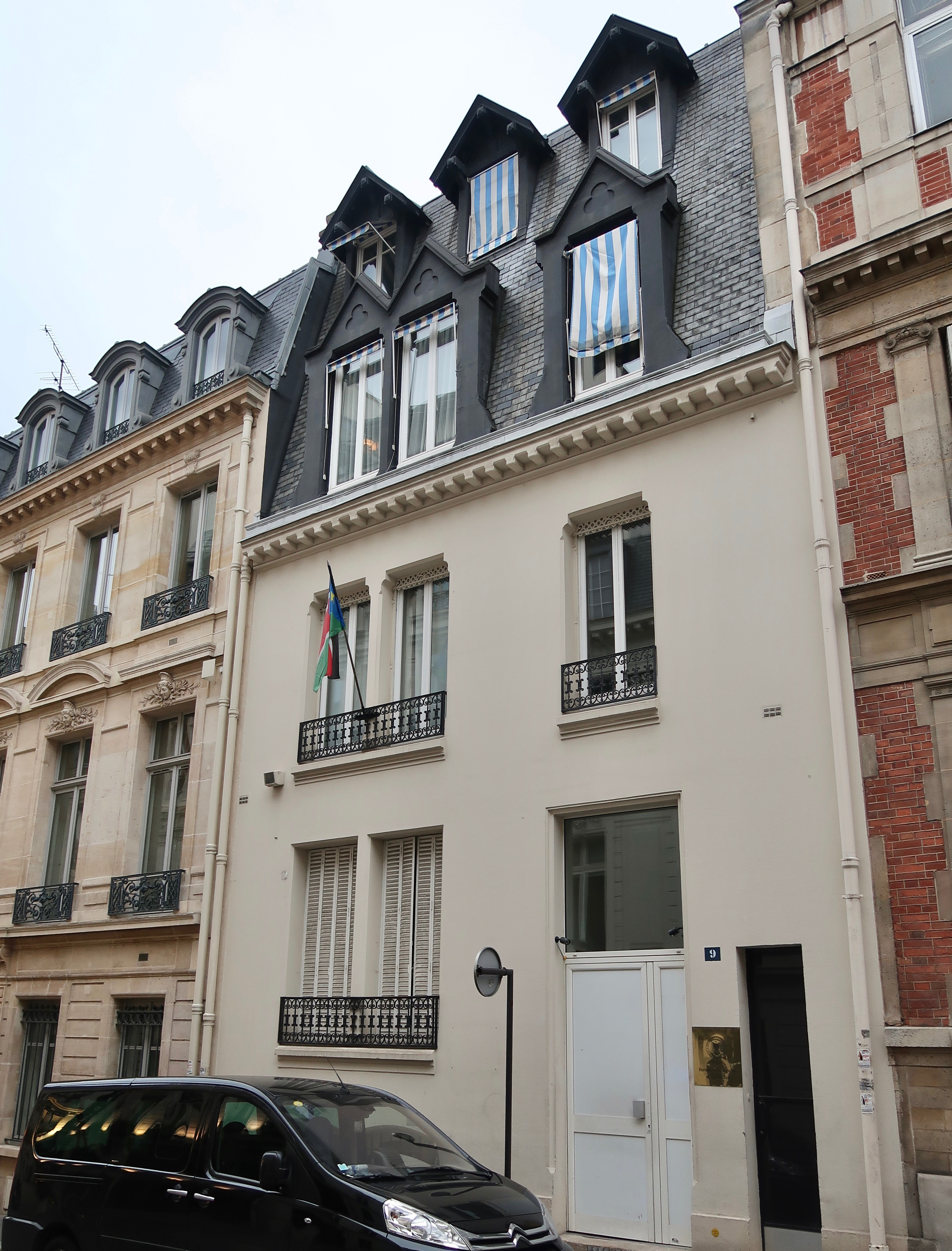
Embassy in Paris

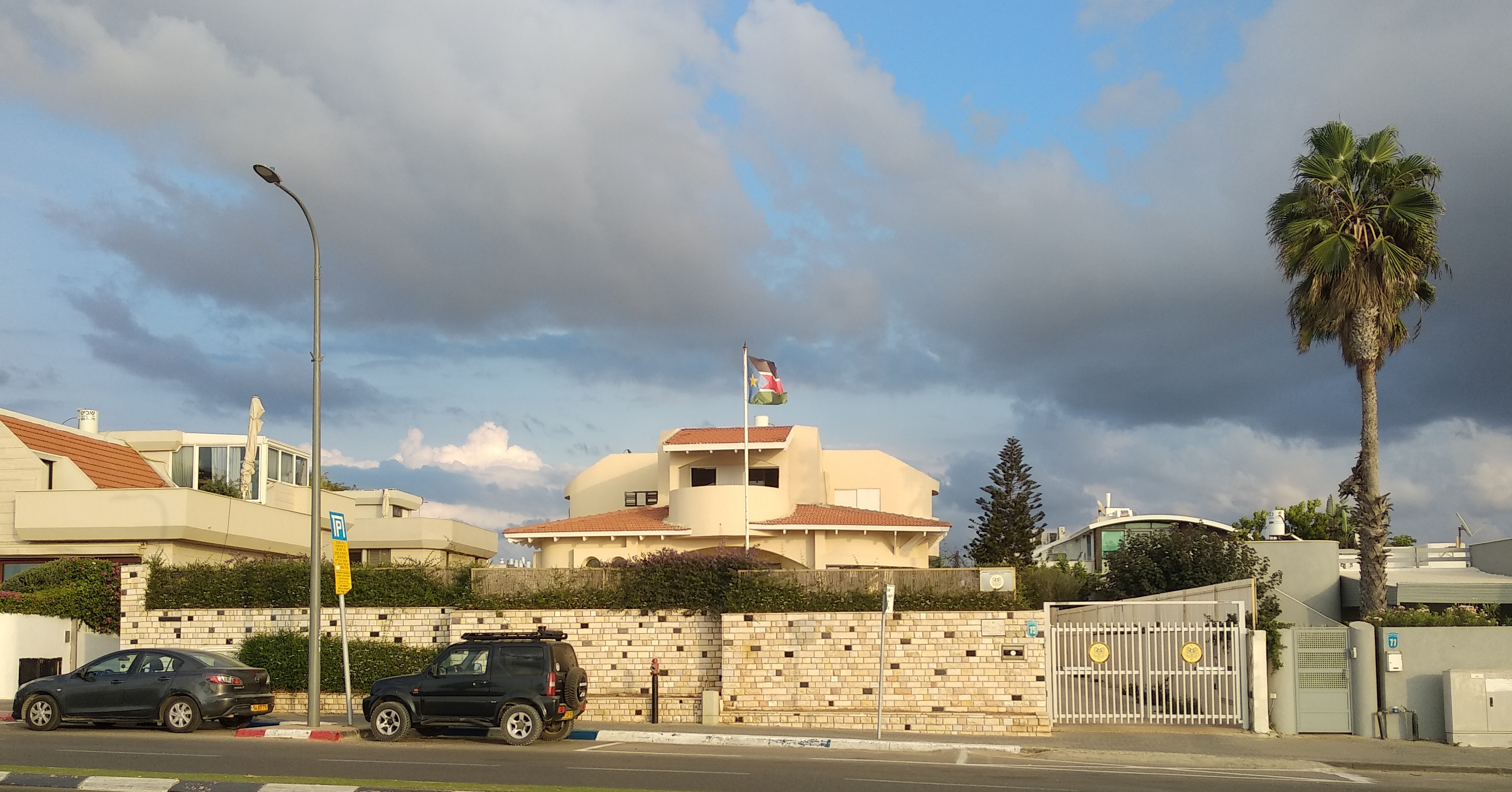
Embassy in Tel Aviv

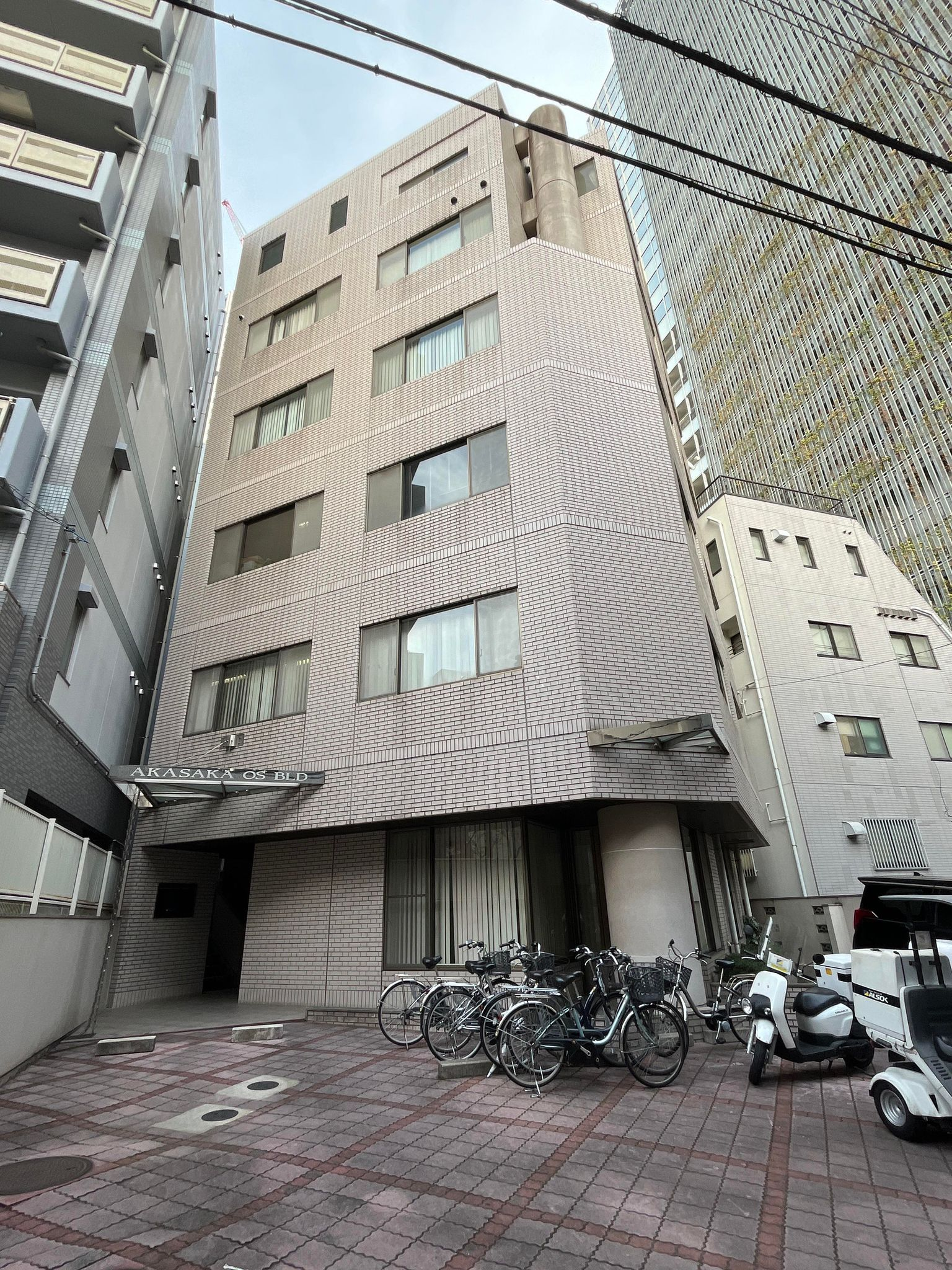
Building hosting the embassy in Tokyo

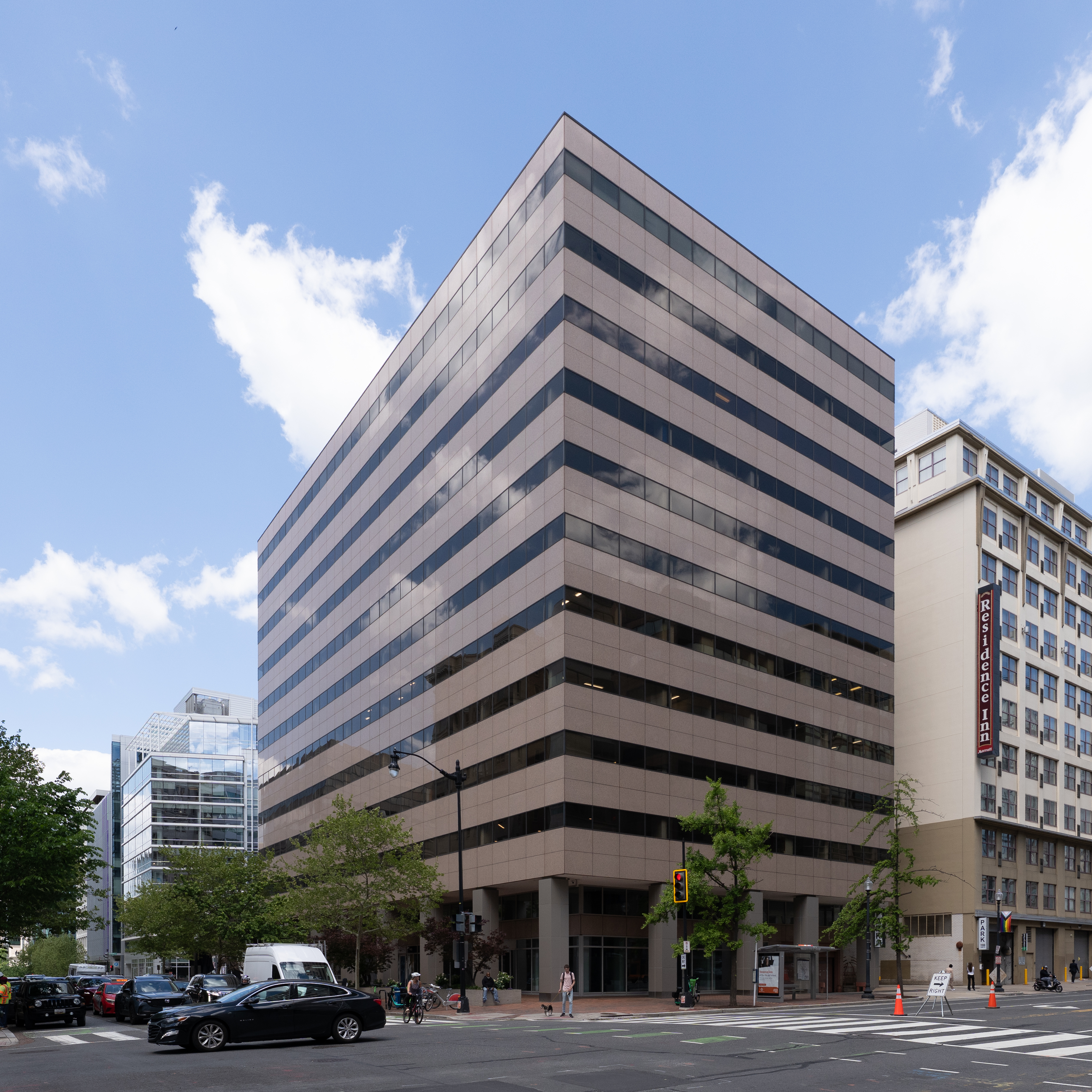
Building hosting the Embassy in Washington, D.C.

== Closed missions ==
=== Africa ===
Host country	Host city	Mission	Year closed	Ref.
Ghana	Accra	Embassy	2018	

=== Americas ===
Host country	Host city	Mission	Year closed	Ref.
Canada	Ottawa	Embassy	Unknown	

== See also ==
- Foreign relations of South Sudan
- List of diplomatic missions in South Sudan
- Visa policy of South Sudan
