= South Sudan–United Kingdom relations =

- South Sudan: United Kingdom

Diplomatic mission
- Embassy of South Sudan, London: Embassy of the United Kingdom, Juba

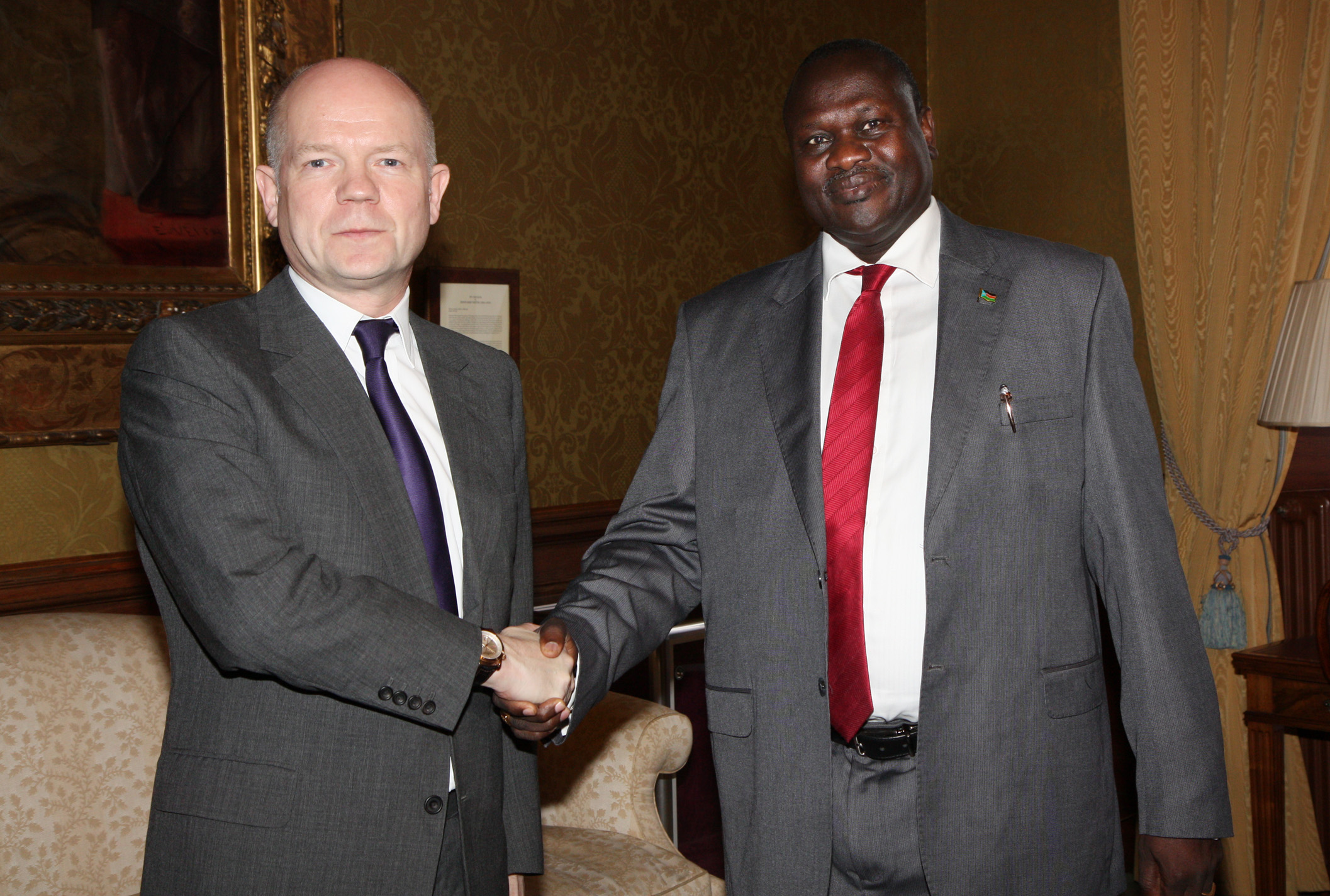
Foreign Secretary William Hague with South Sudanese Vice President Riek Machar in London, January 2013.

South Sudan and the United Kingdom established diplomatic relations on 9 July 2011.

Both countries share common membership of the United Nations. Bilaterally the two countries have a Development Partnership.

== History ==
The UK governed South Sudan from 1899 to 1956, when Sudan achieved full independence.

== Diplomatic missions ==
- South Sudan maintains an embassy in London.
- The United Kingdom is accredited to South Sudan through its embassy in Juba.

== See also ==
- Foreign relations of South Sudan
- Foreign relations of the United Kingdom
