= Moustapha Soumaré =

Malian diplomat

Moustapha Soumaré is the United Nations Deputy Special Representative in the Republic of South Sudan. Prior to this appointment of 24 December 2014 by United Nations Secretary-General Ban Ki-moon, Mr. Soumaré served as the United Nations Deputy Special Representative in the Democratic Republic of the Congo.

Over the years, Soumaré has collected extensive project and development experience. From 2009 to 2012, he was Deputy Special Representative for Recovery and Governance of the United Nations Mission in Liberia (UNMIL). From 2007 to 2009, Soumaré served as Deputy Assistant Administrator of United Nations Development Programme (UNDP) and Deputy Regional Director for the Regional Bureau for Africa, New York City. From 2005 to 2007, he was Resident Coordinator and UNDP Resident Representative in Rwanda. From 2000 to 2005, he held a similar position in Benin. Prior to joining the UN, he served both in the Ministry of Rural Development and in the Department of Forestry in Bamako of Mali.

Soumaré graduated with a doctorate degree in Soil and Water Conservation from the University of Belgrade in Yugoslavia.
