= Romanian Revival architecture =

Architectural movement based on brâncovenesc architecture

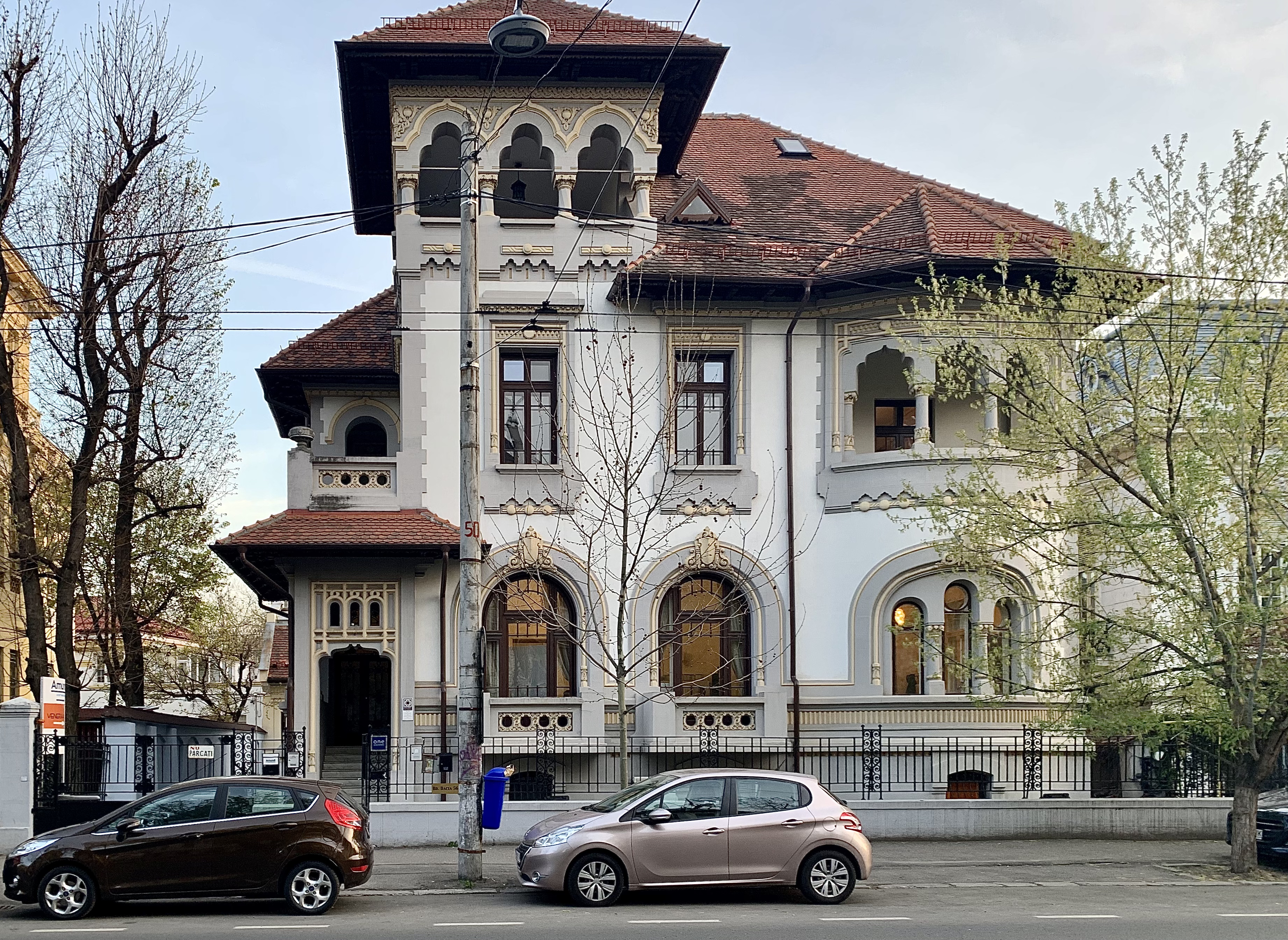
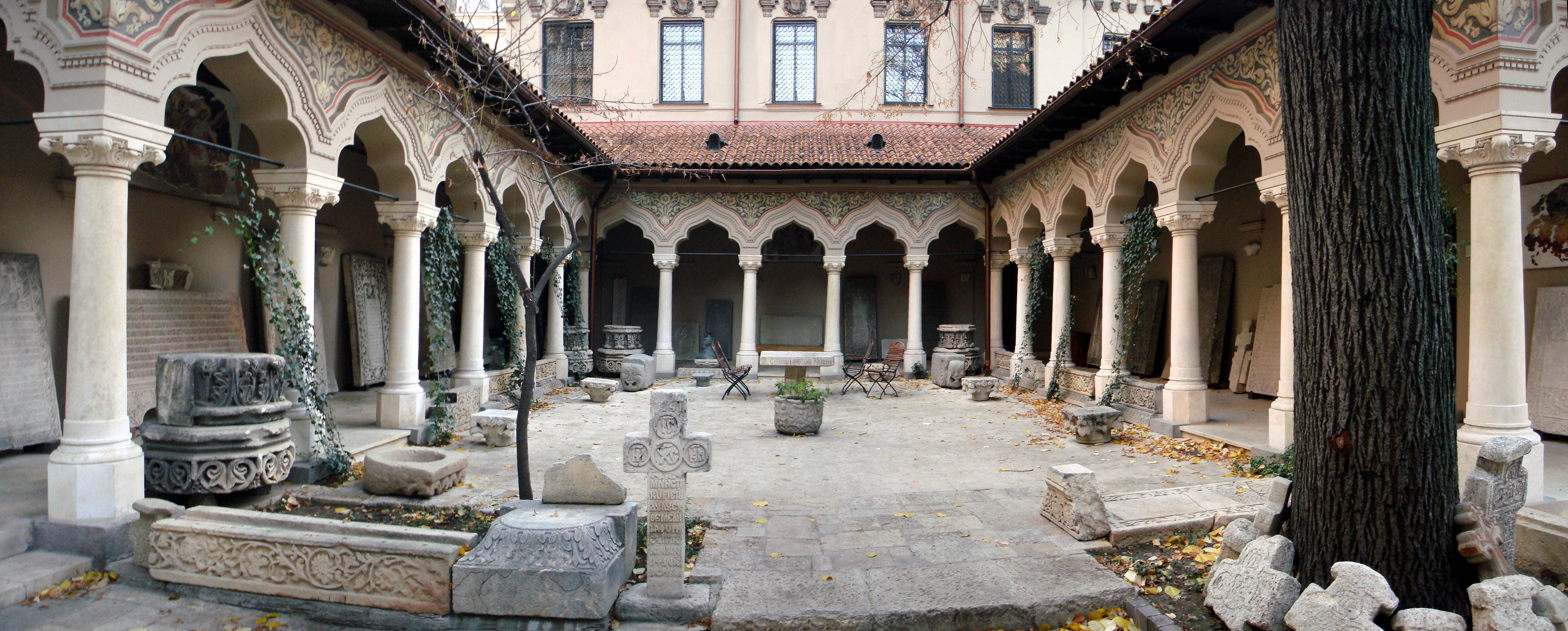
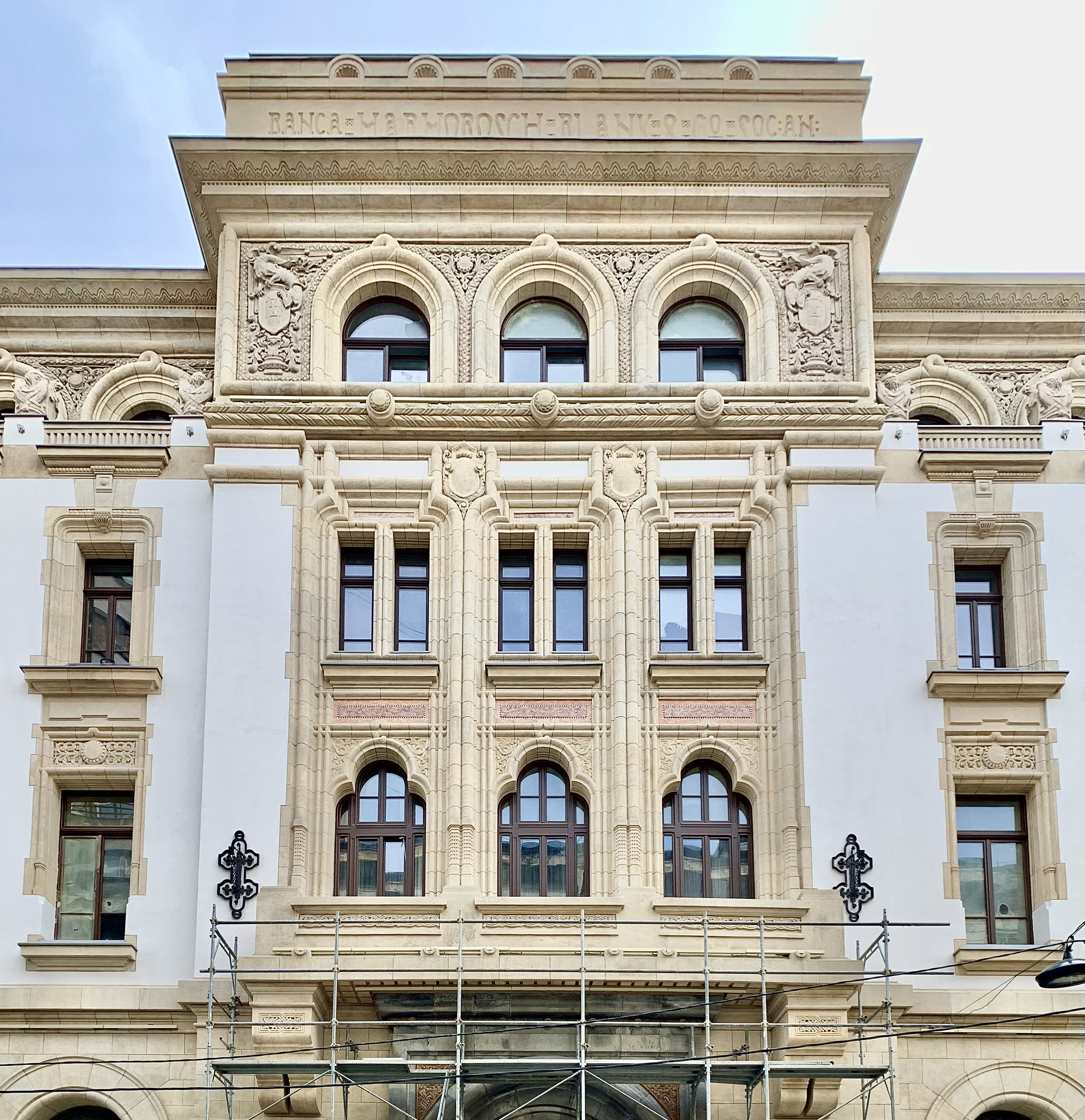
- Top:C.N. Câmpeanu House by Constantin Nănescu, in Bucharest, c.1923; Centre: The Cloister of the Stavropoleos Monastery by Ion Mincu, in Bucharest, c.1899-1910; Bottom: The Marmorosch Blank Bank Palace in Bucharest, 1915-1923
- Years active: late 19th century–first half of the 20th century
- Location: Romania and the Republic of Moldova

Romanian Revival architecture (a.k.a. Romanian National Style, Neo-Romanian, or Neo-Brâncovenesc; Romanian: stilul național român, arhitectura neoromânească, neobrâncovenească) is an architectural style that has appeared in the late 19th century in Romanian Art Nouveau, initially being the result of the attempts of finding a specific Romanian architectural style. The attempts are mainly due to the architects Ion Mincu (1852–1912), and Ion N. Socolescu (1856–1924). The peak of the style was the interwar period. The style was a national reaction after the domination of French-inspired Classicist Eclecticism. Apart from foreign influences, the contribution of Romanian architects, who reinvented the tradition, creating, at the same time, an original style, is manifesting more and more strongly. Ion Mincu and his successors, Grigore Cerchez, Cristofi Cerchez, Petre Antonescu, or Nicolae Ghica-Budești declared themselves for a modern architecture, with Romanian specific, based on theses such as those formulated by Alexandru Odobescu around 1870:

"Study the remains – no matter how small – of the artistic production of the past and make them the source of a great art (...) do not miss any opportunity to use the artistic elements presented by the Romanian monuments left over from old times; but transform them, change them, develop them ..."

Of course, such a program was not easy to accomplish. All the more so as the new types of urban architecture, especially those with many floors, demanded simple solutions, which hardly supported the world of medieval forms and ornaments or that of folklore, the main sources of inspiration of the style.

19th century nationalism combined without problems with Europeanism and admiration for the West, Romania wanting to prove that it is a European country. After 1900, without abandoning European trends, the emphasis is more on values with Romanian specificity. As a result, the Parisian and Viennese buildings of the late nineteenth century are contrasted with a "Romanian style". The popularity of the Romanian style continues and intensifies in the interwar period. The heyday of the style were the 1920s, when many Romanian Revival houses, churches and institution buildings were erected, both in Bucharest and in the rest of Greater Romania. The trend had also extended into the decorative arts from the start, with examples of Neo-Romanian design of furniture and other objects appearing, but also illustrations and graphic design (including stamps and magazine covers).

== Origins ==
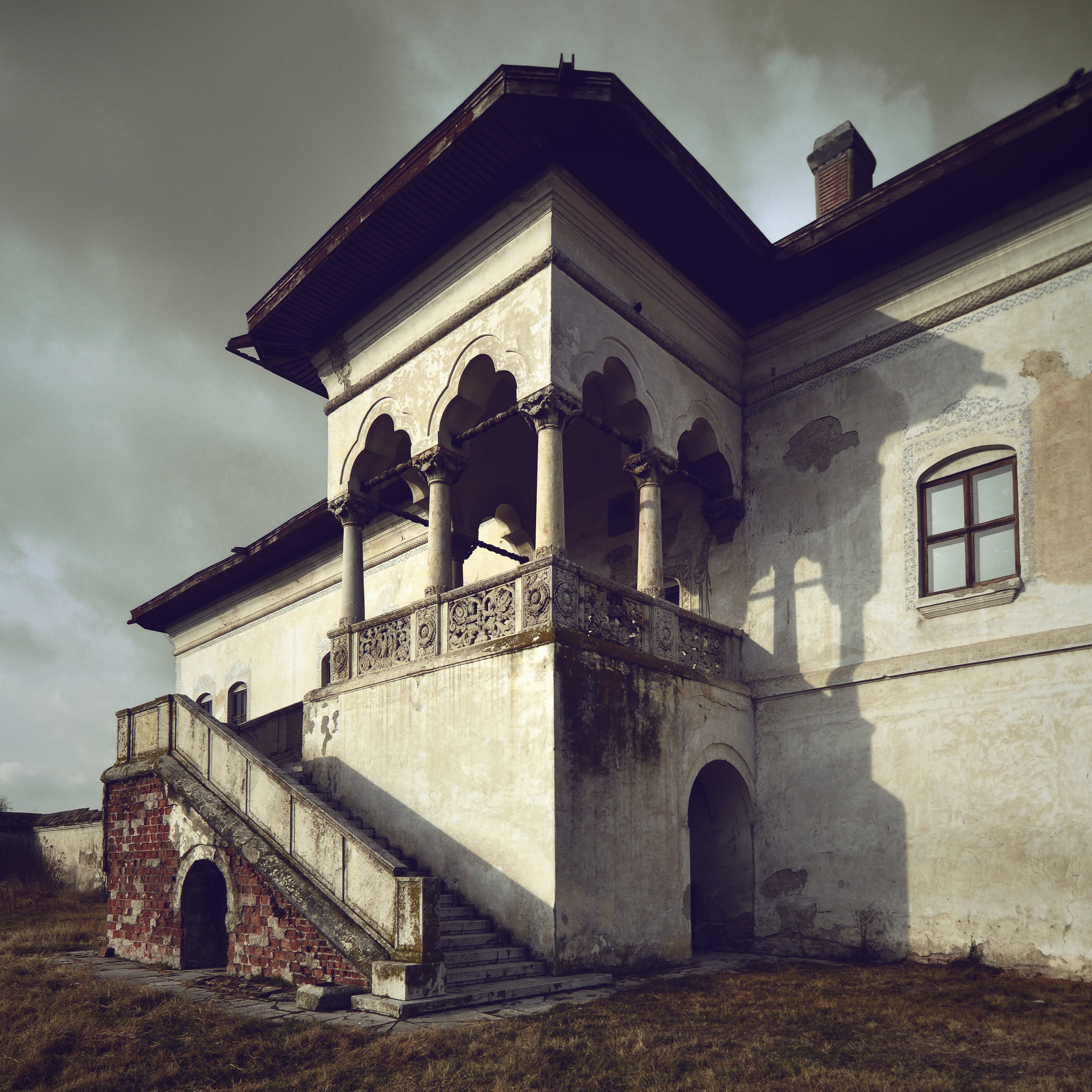
The Potlogi Palace, Dâmbovița County, Romania, 17th century

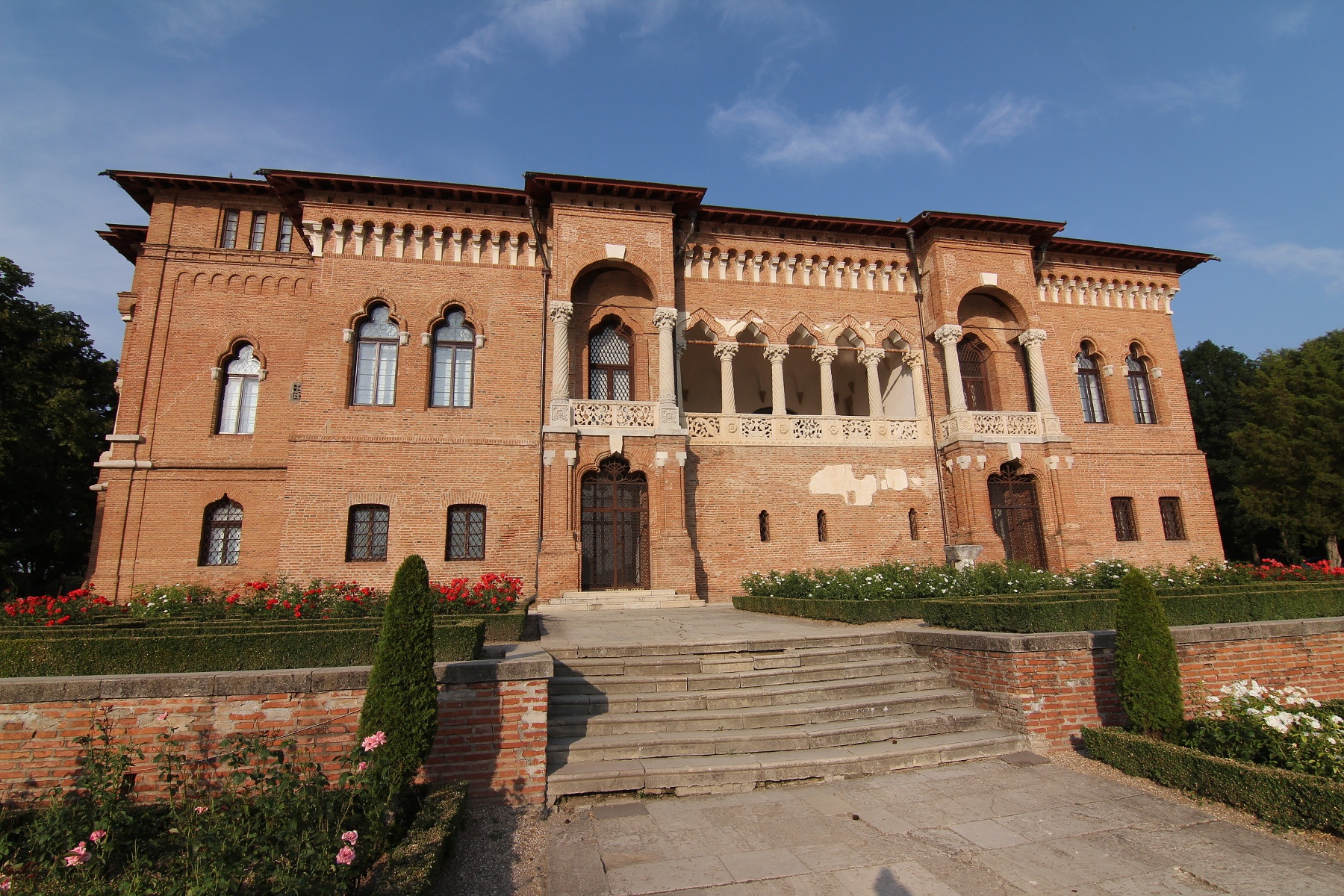
The main building of the Mogoșoaia Palace, Mogoșoaia, Romania, early 18th century

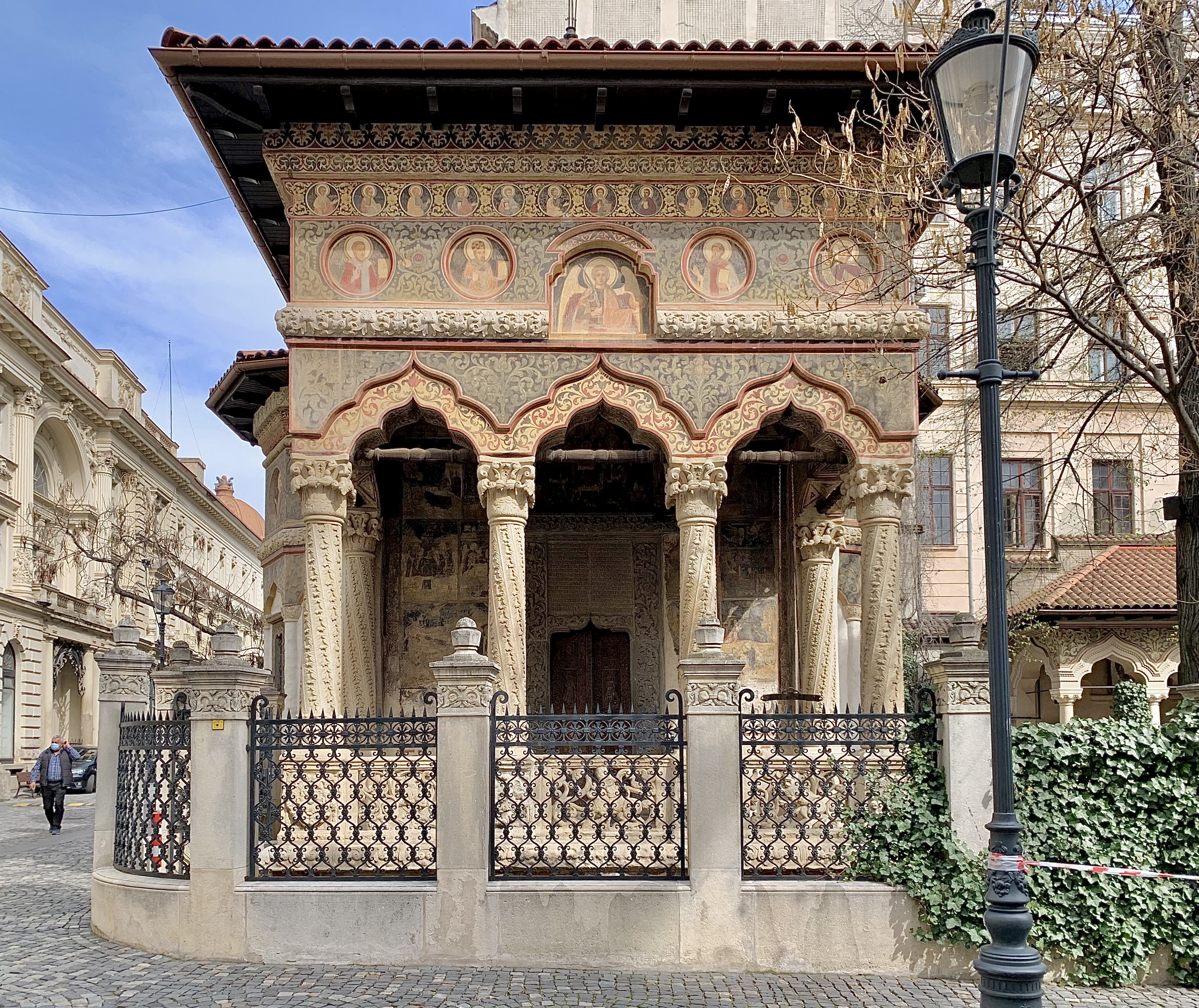
The Stavropoleos Church, downtown Bucharest, 1724

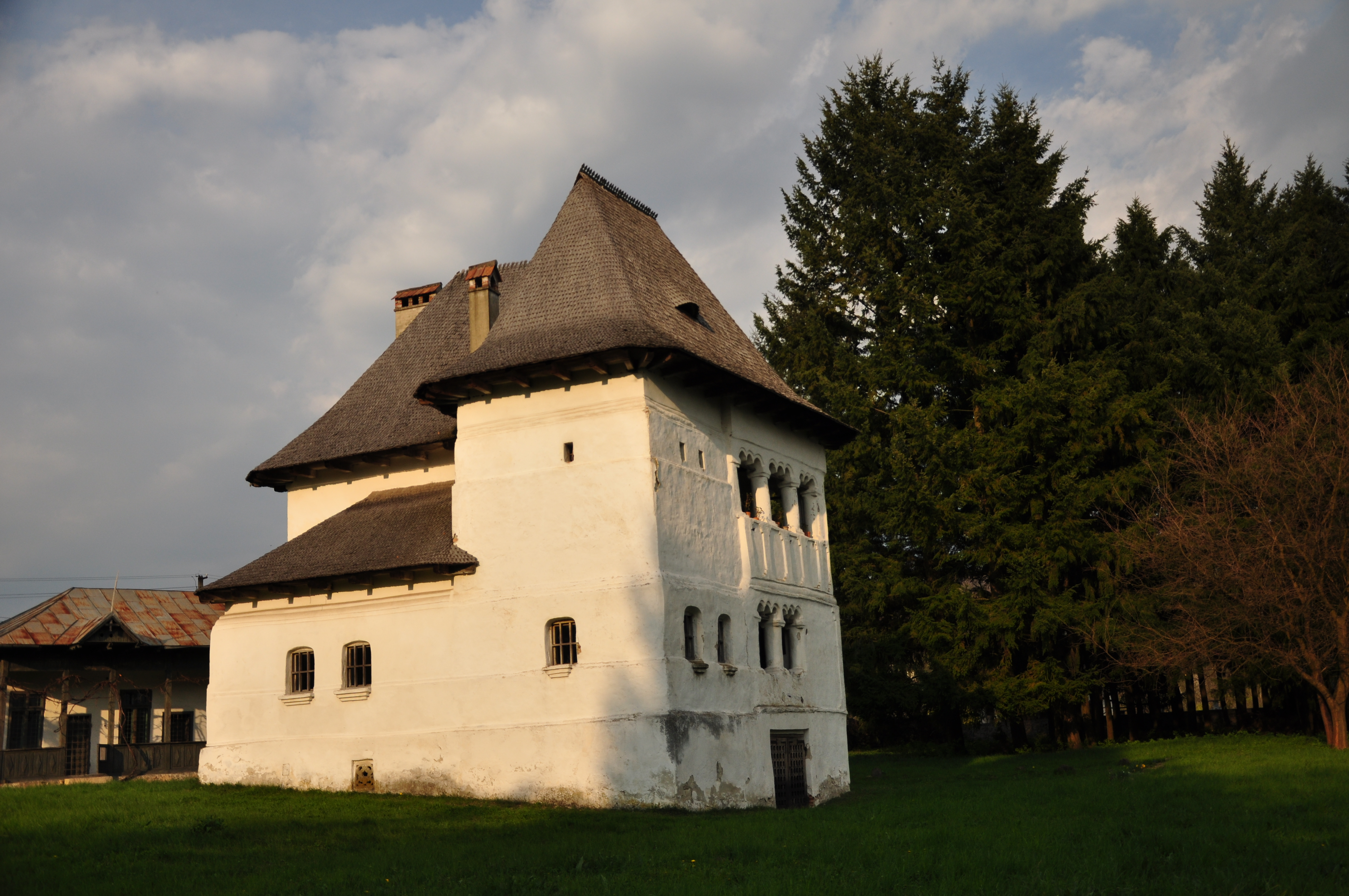
Greceanu Culă, Măldărești, Vâlcea County, Romania, 18th century

Romanian Revival architecture is a revival of the Brâncovenesc [brɨŋkovenesk], a style in medieval Romanian art and architecture, more specifically in Wallachia during the reign of Constantin Brâncoveanu (1688–1714). This is because it was seen as the style specific to Romania, which is true. Brâncovenesc buildings are characterised by the use of porticos (mainly the entrances of churches), trilobate or kokoshnik arches, columns (usually Corinthian), sometimes with twisted flutings, and metallic or ceramic tile roof. The main ornaments used for decoration are the interlace and the complex vegetal spiral (aka rinceau). Some of the features of Brâncovenesc architecture derive from Byzantine and Ottoman architecture, and some can also be found in medieval Russian architecture.

Brâncovenesc churches usually have façades decorated with reliefs, most churches being white, while some have elaborate paintings on the façades (like the Stavropoleos Monastery from Bucharest). The walls of their interiors are filled with Byzantine style frescos. Above their main door there is a pisanie, which is an inscribed stone plaque. The inscription usually includes a religious invocation, the name of the founder or founders, the date of construction, the motivation of the building, the circumstances of the time and other data.

== Characteristics ==
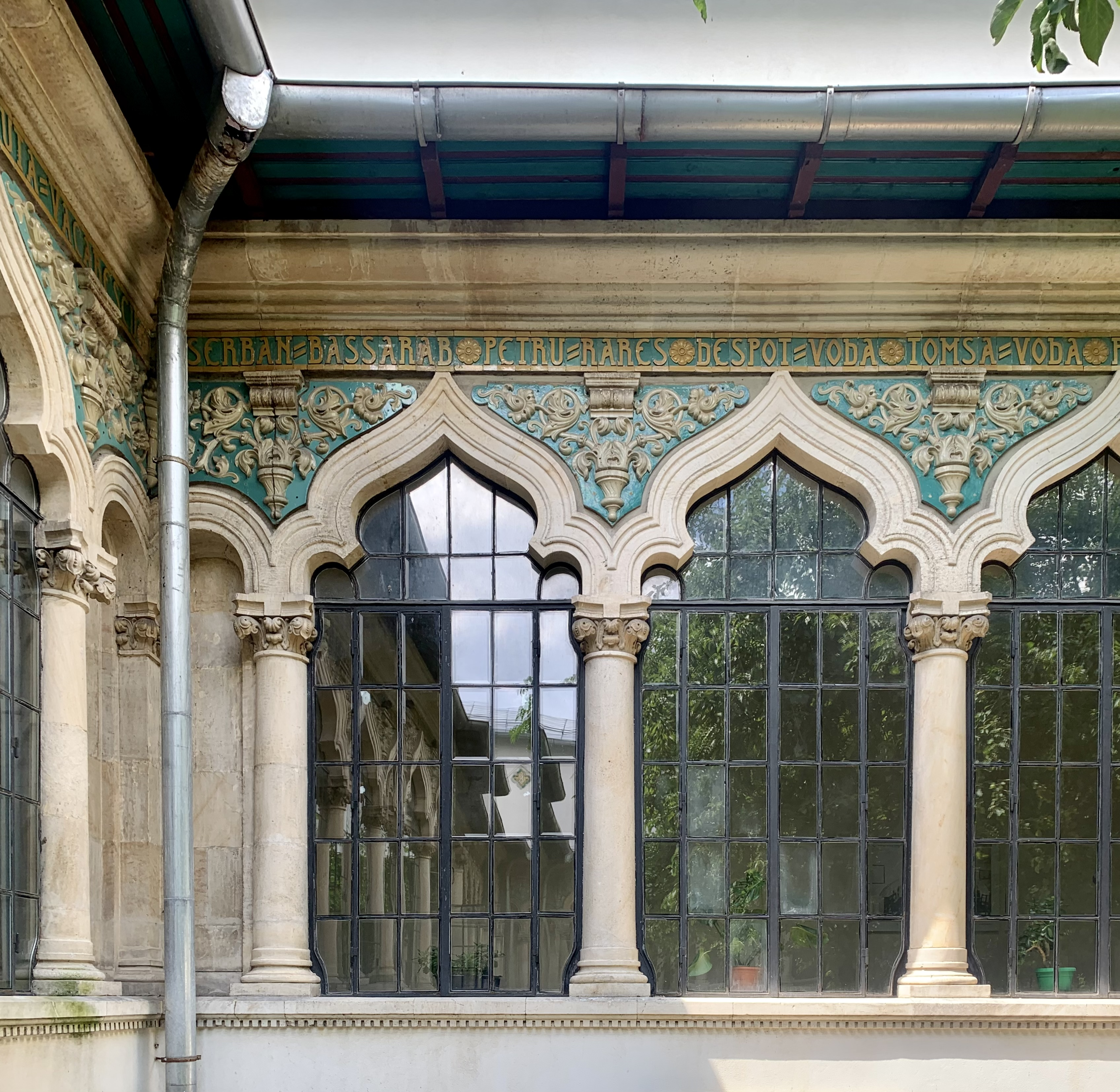
Polychrome glazed ceramic ornaments - Școala Centrală National College, Bucharest

Trilobate arches - Bucharest City Hall

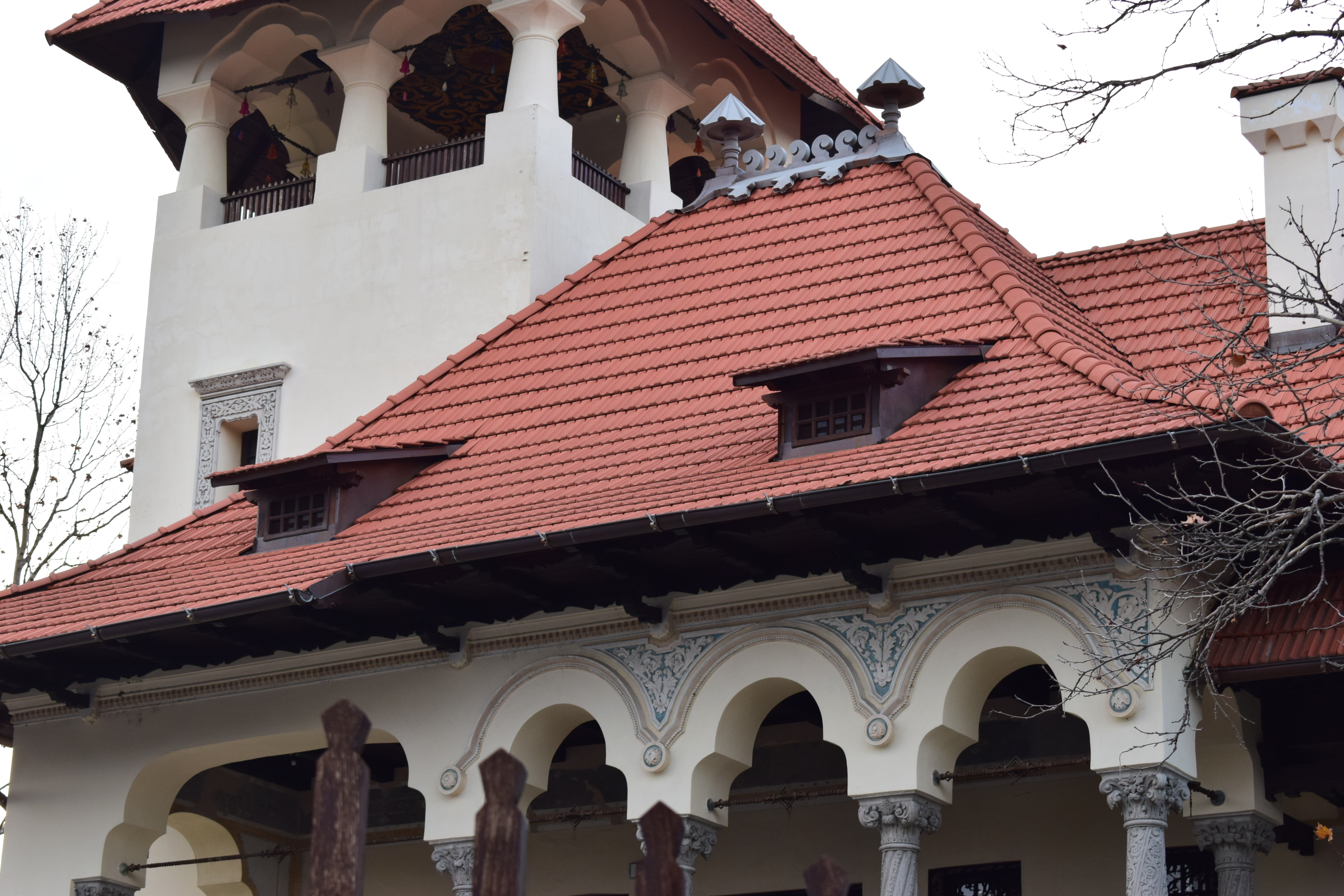
Tiled roofs - Nicolae Minovici House Bucharest

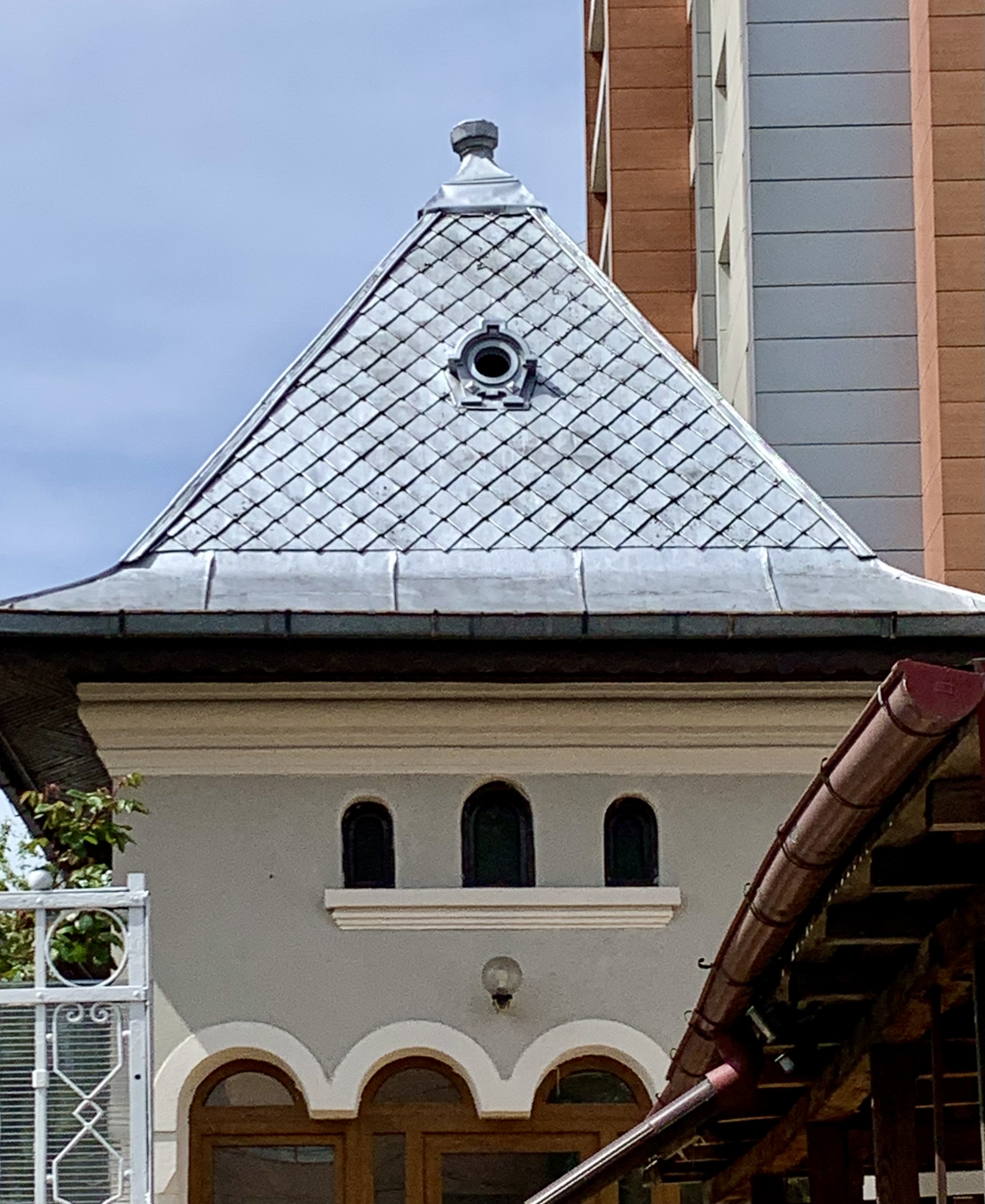
Metal roofs, with diamond-shaped parts - Strada Constantin C. Nottara no. 6, Bucharest

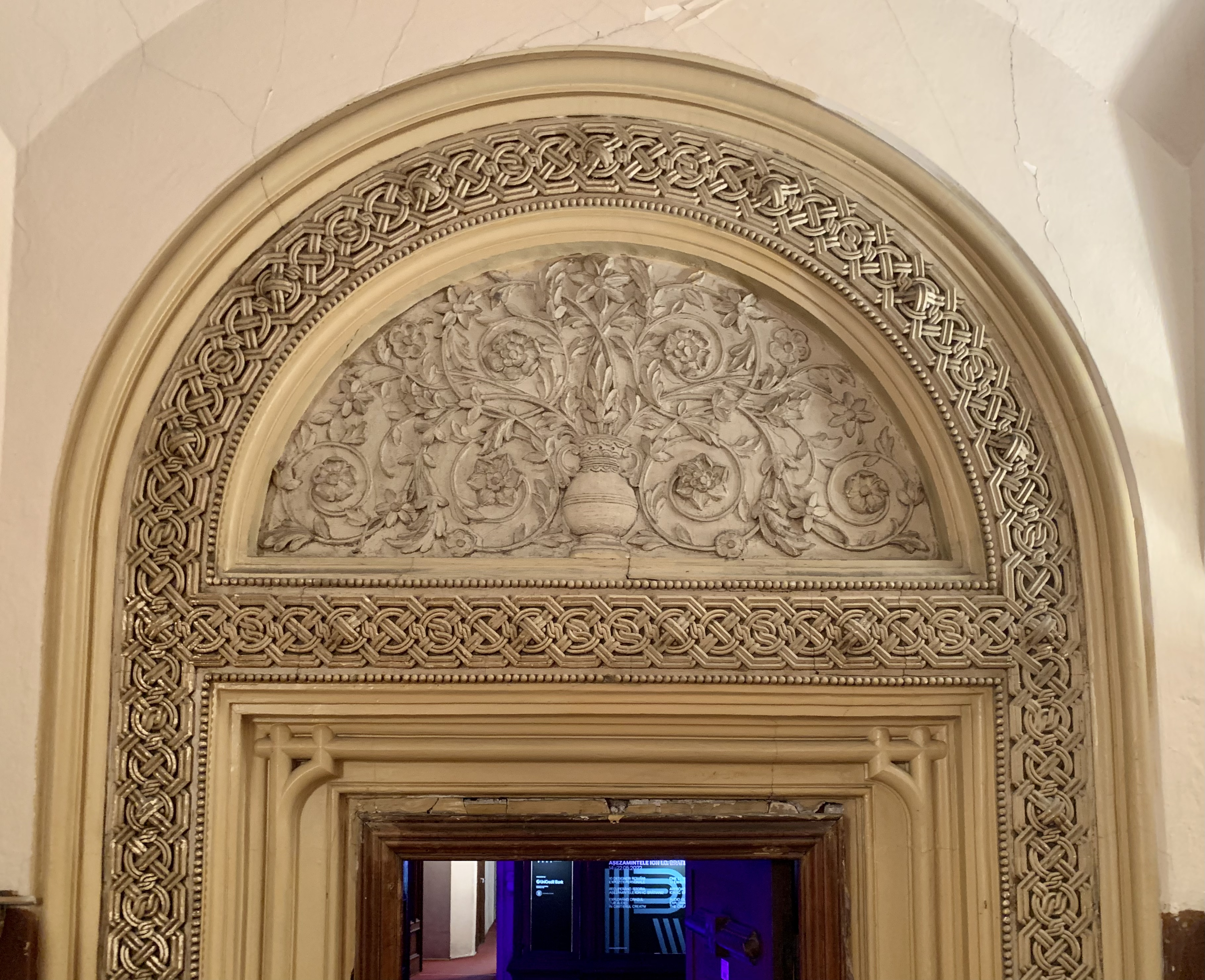
Complex knots (aka interlaces) - Brătianu Settlements Bucharest

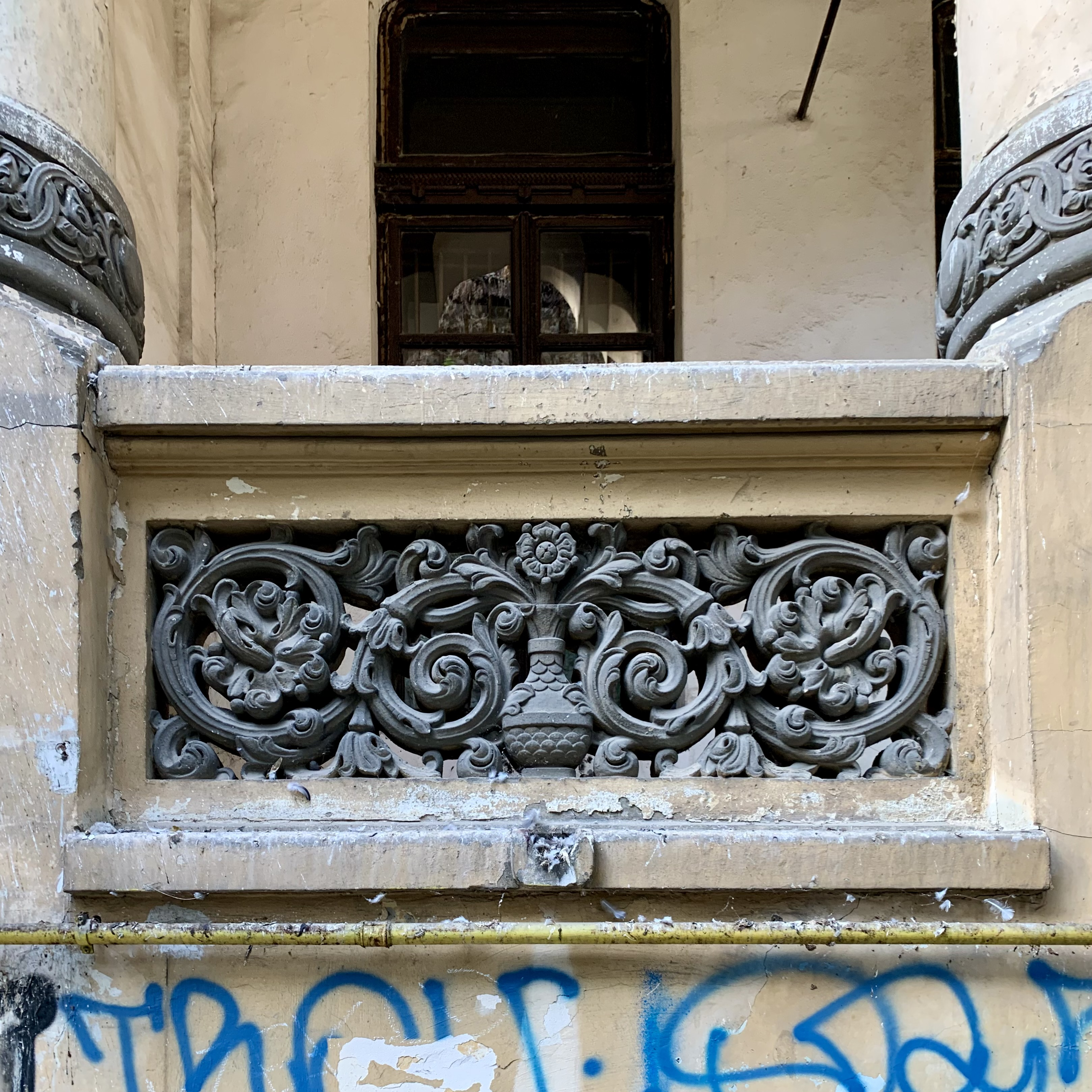
Complex foliage spirals (aka rinceaux) - Brătianu Settlements

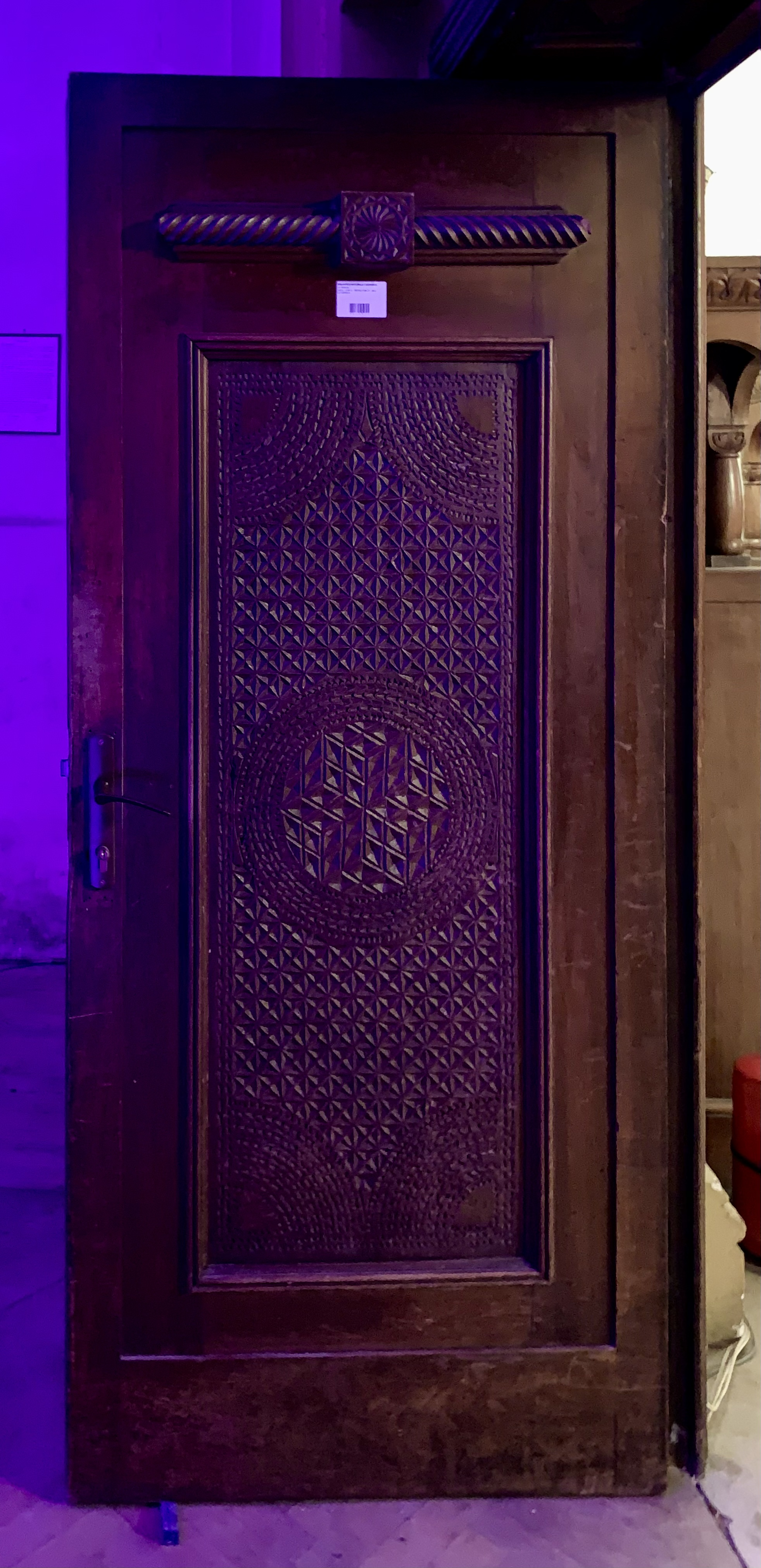
Elements brought from peasant houses - Brătianu Settlements

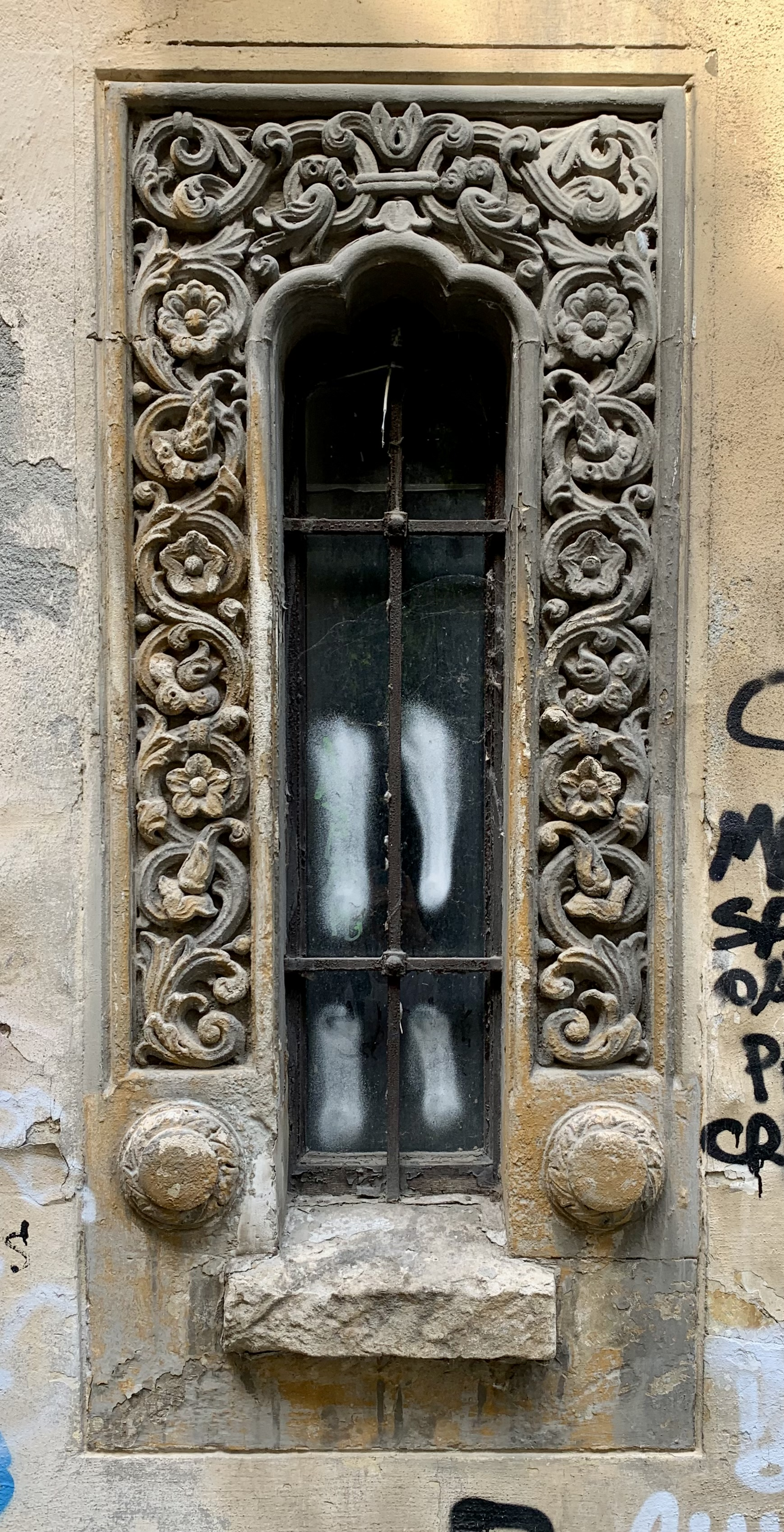
Elements brought from religious architecture - Brătianu Settlements

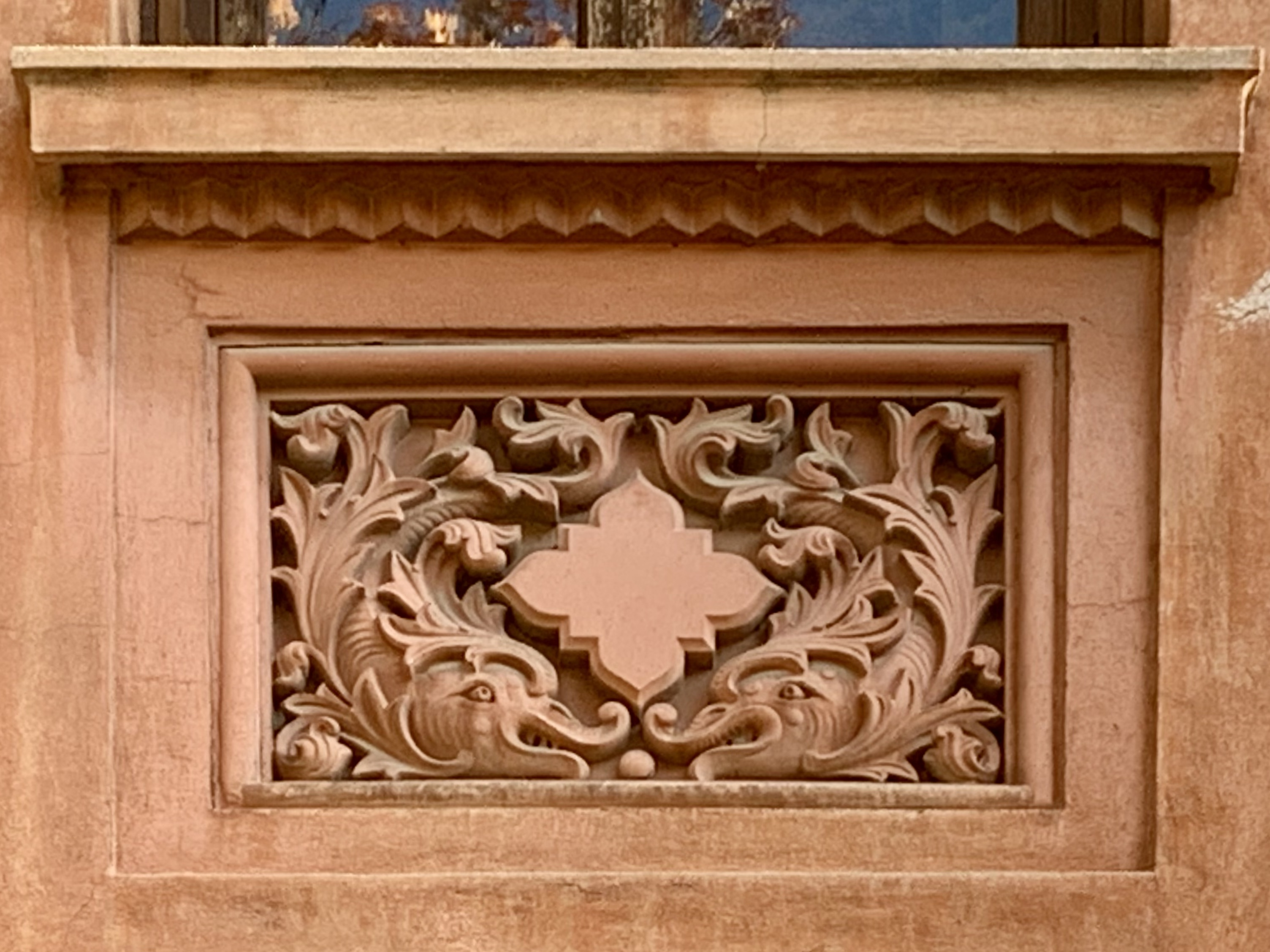
Elements brought from Byzantine architecture (in this case the fish, aka ichthys, an early Christian symbolism) - Strada Louis Pasteur no. 24, Bucharest

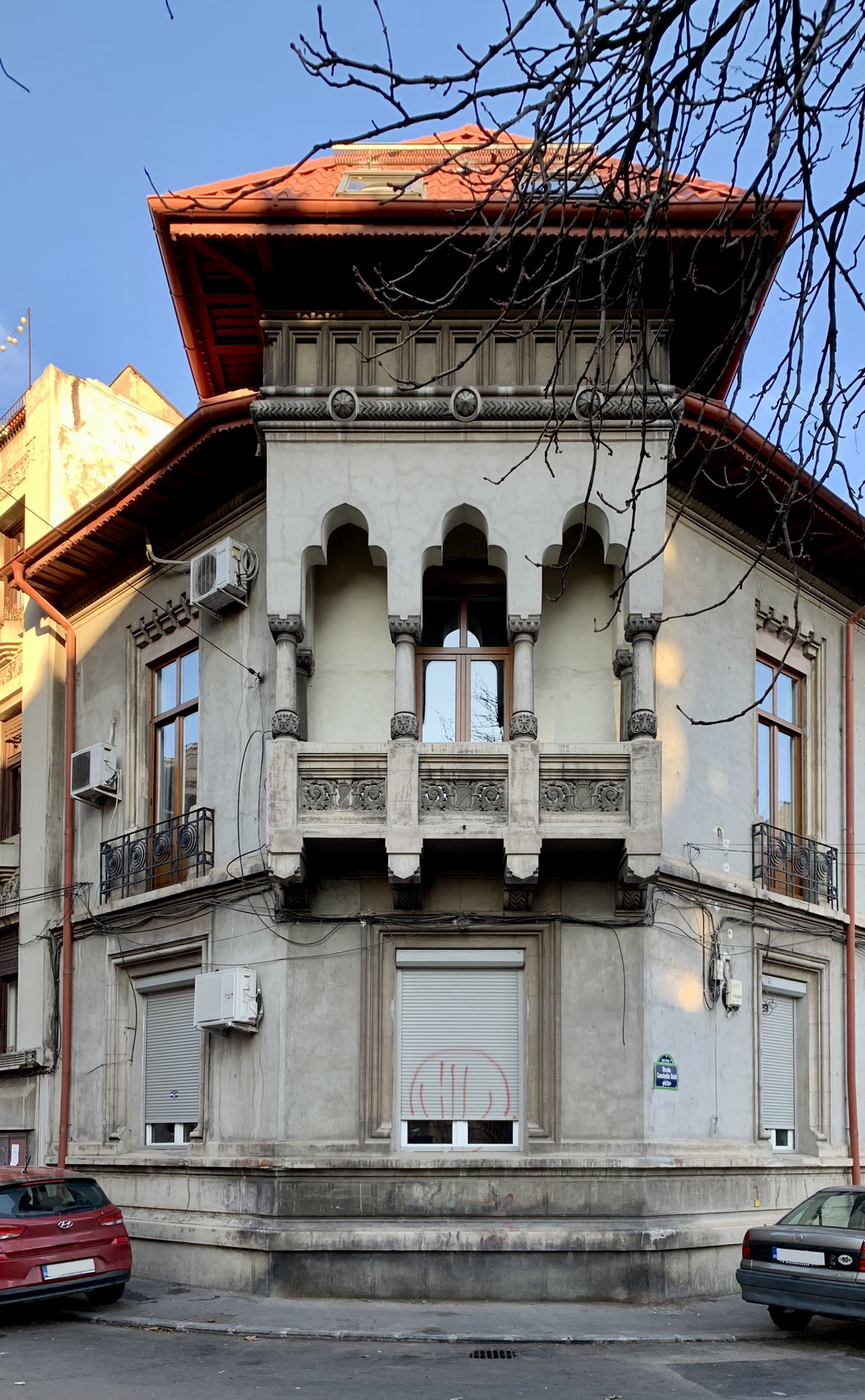
Elements grouped in threes (in this case three arches) - Strada Pictor Constantin Stahi no. 14, Bucharest

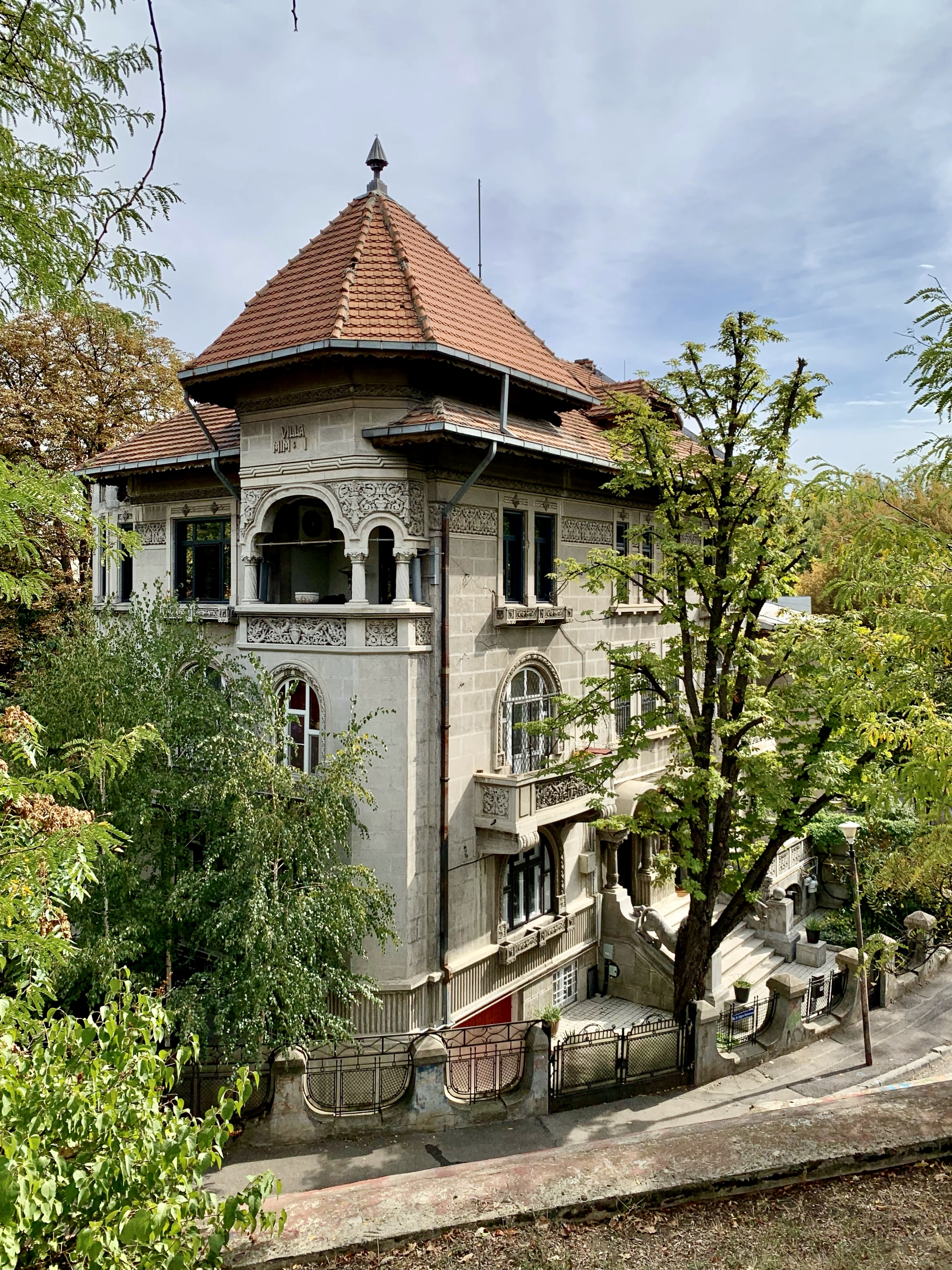
Building structure inspired by cule - Strada Grigore Romniceanu no. 54, Bucharest

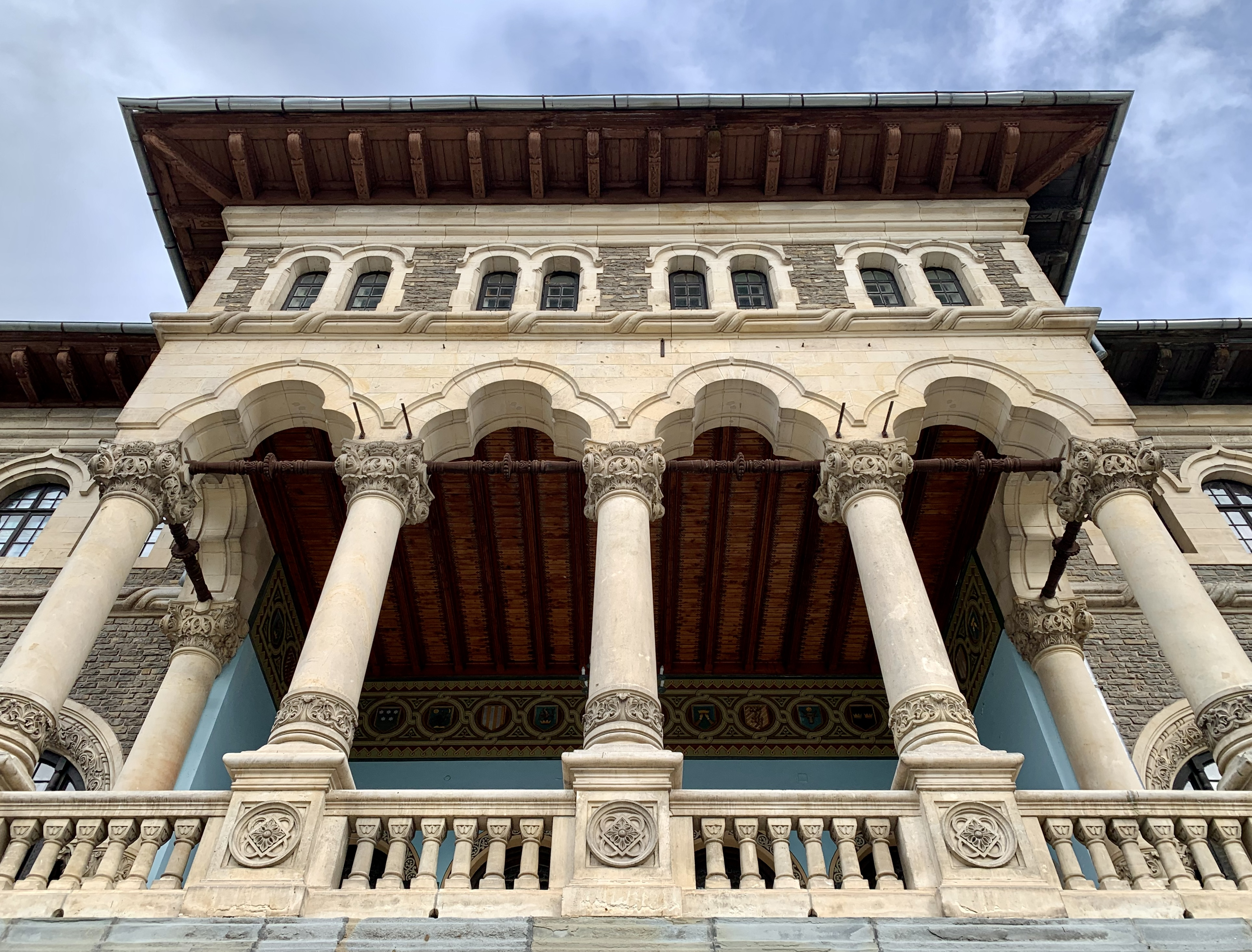
Trilobed arches - Cantacuzino Castle in Bușteni

The influences of peasant houses were manifested through ornaments and elements used under various interpretations, but which retain their origin. Among the elements are the loggia, the trilobed arch, wooden pillars, a treatment of the cornice as an ordinary eaves of a peasant house, the inclusion of the roof in the image of the facade as an element of ornament, carved wooden awnings, and tiled roofs. Commonly used ornaments are knots and ropes (aka interlace), peacocks drinking symmetrically from a cup, and complex vegetable spirals (aka rinceaux). Some of the ornaments of some Neo-Romanian buildings from the Belle Époque are made of polychrome glazed ceramic, as is the case of the Școala Centrală National College in Bucharest. Considering the fact that most Romanians were and are Orthodox, the architects sometimes added Byzantine-inspired elements (like the two peacocks drinking from a cup) or with Christian significance. A characteristic of the style is the use of elements grouped in threes (for example a row of three windows), which refers to a Christian concept, representing the Holy Trinity (Father, Son and Holy Spirit).

The buildings often have a medieval castle or fortress look, with turrets and parts of the structure on different levels. This thing is inspired by the cule, a type of semi-fortified construction, specific to the 18th century, spread throughout the Balkan space, including Romania, especially in Serbia and Albania. In essence, the cule were the dwellings of the boyars, built for the defense of the owner and their family members against invasions.

== Representative architects ==
The first generation of Romanian architects, creators and promoters of the Romanian Revival style, is composed of Ion Mincu (1852–1912), Ion N. Socolescu (1856–1924) and Grigore Cerchez (1850–1927).

=== Ion Mincu ===
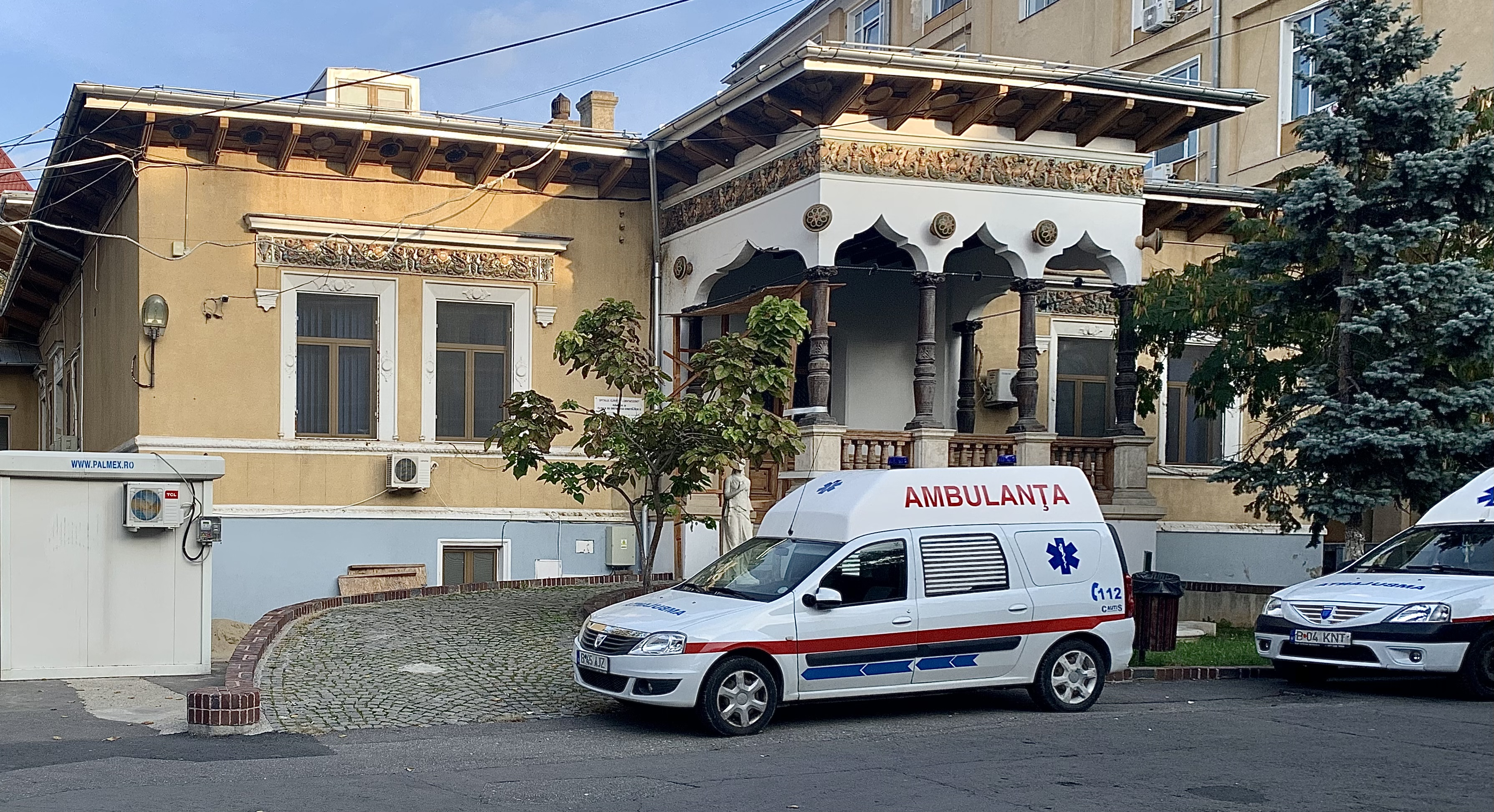
Lahovari House, now in the courtyard of the Cantacuzino Hospital in Bucharest (1885-1886), Strada Ion Movilă no. 5

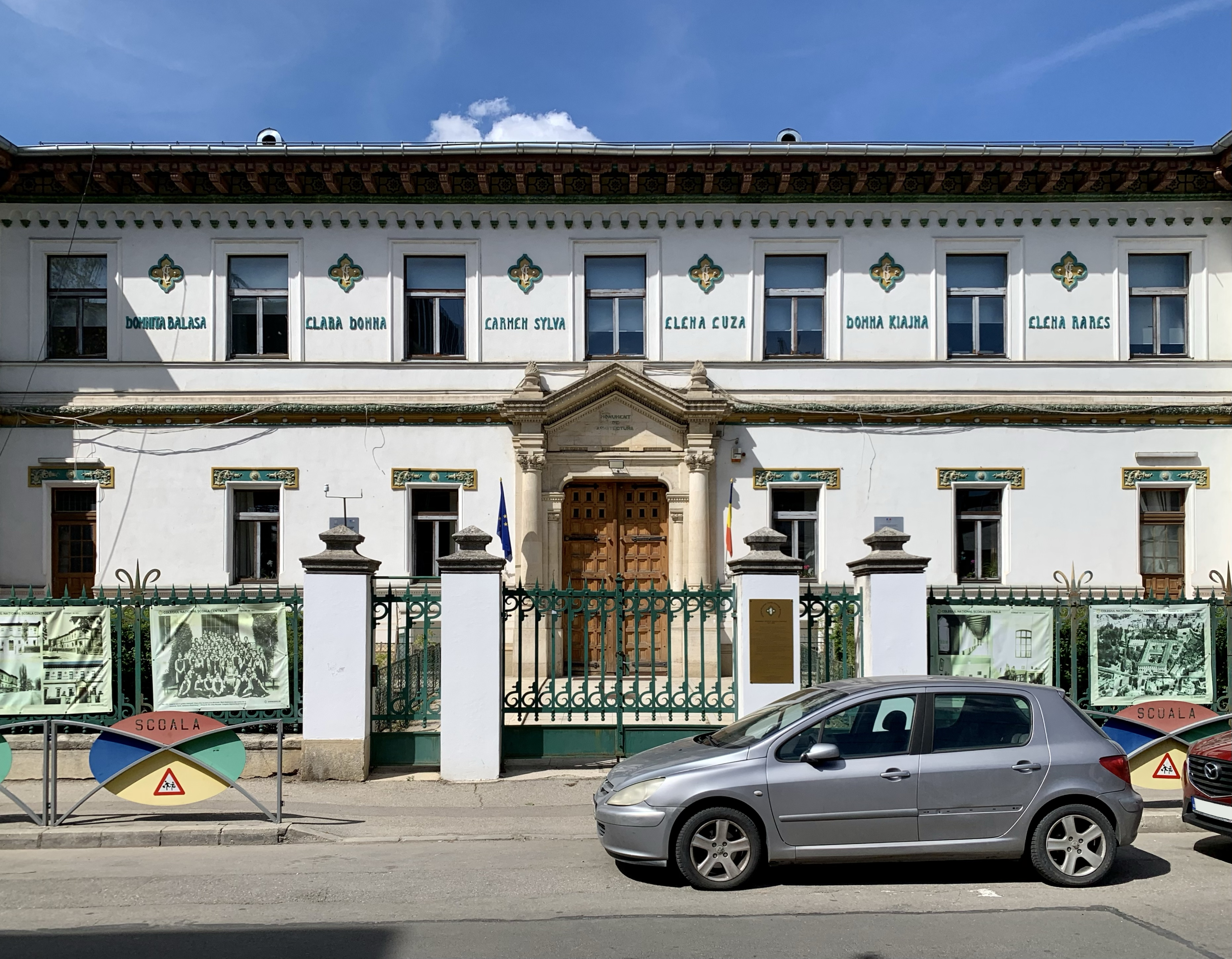
Central Girls' School in Bucharest (1890), Strada Icoanei no. 3-5

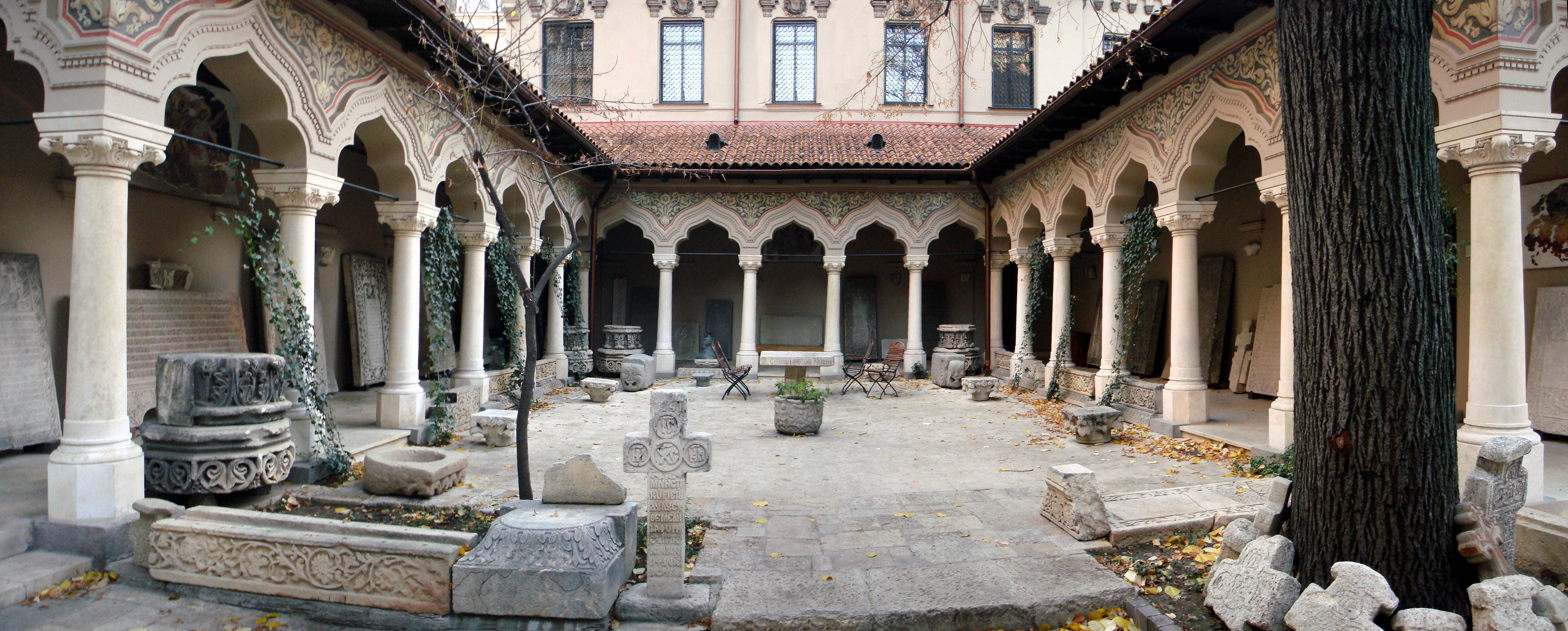
The Cloister of the Stavropoleos Monastery in Bucharest (c.1899–1910), Strada Poștei no. 6

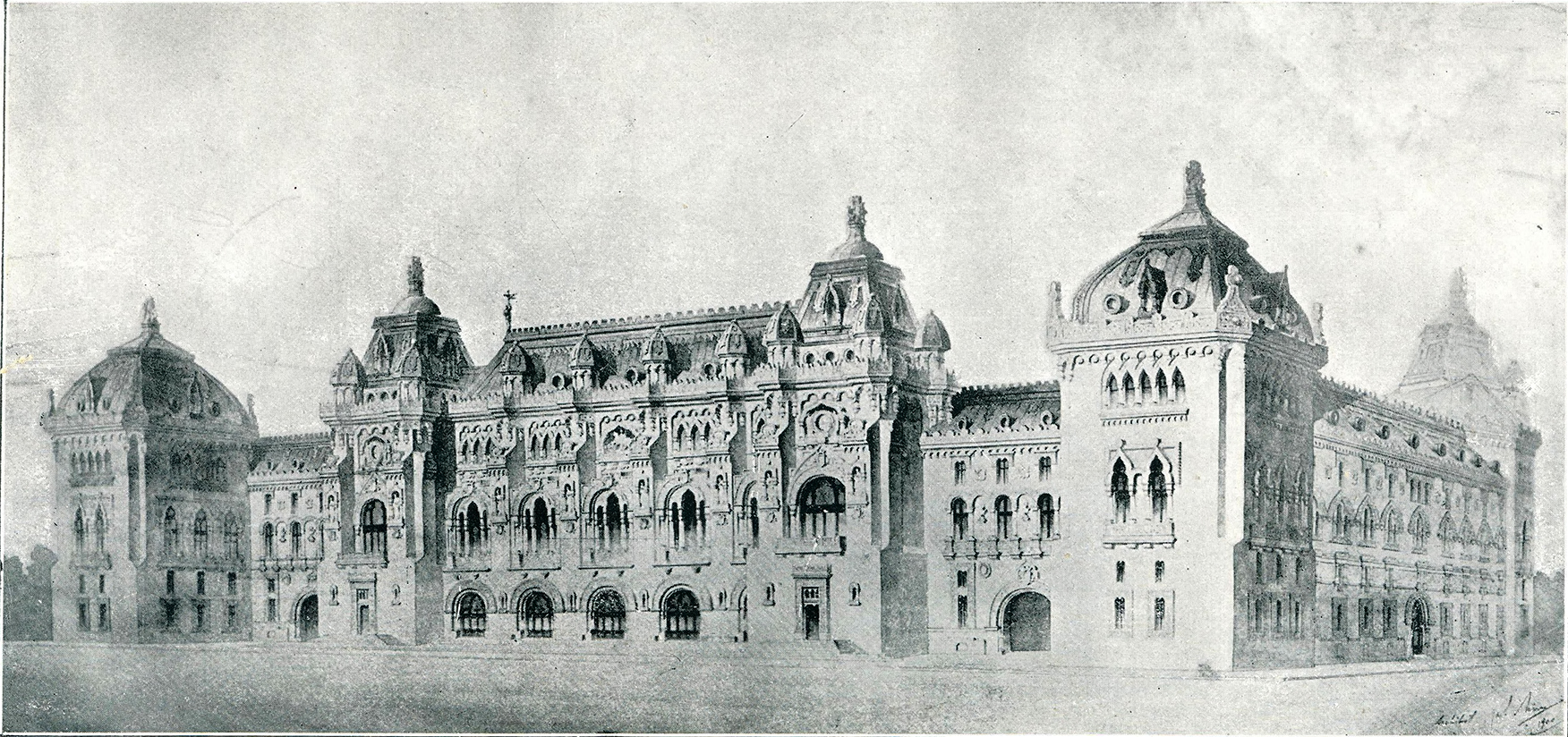
Design for the Bucharest city hall (1900)

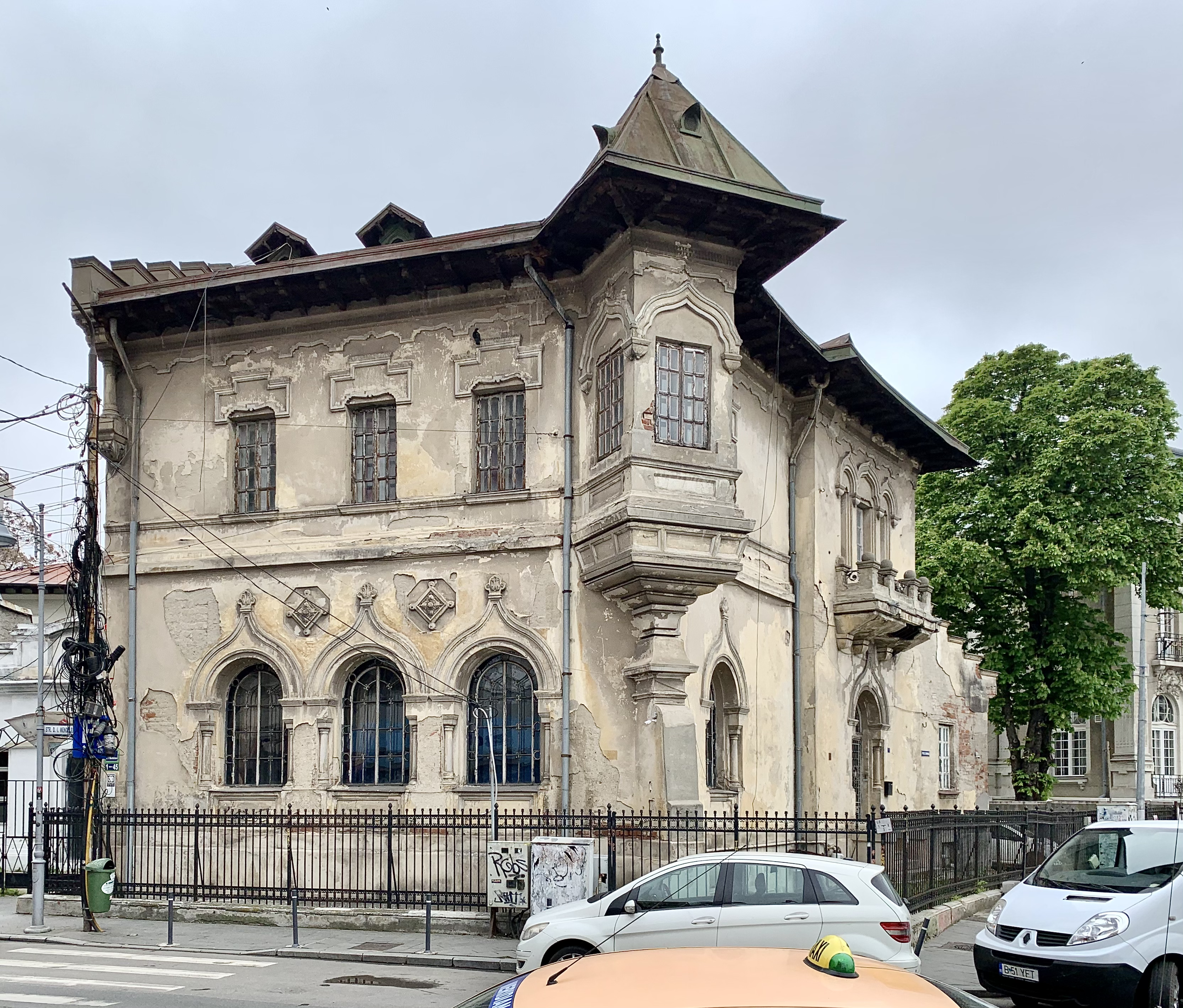
Nicolae Petrașcu House (1900–1904), Piața Romană no. 1

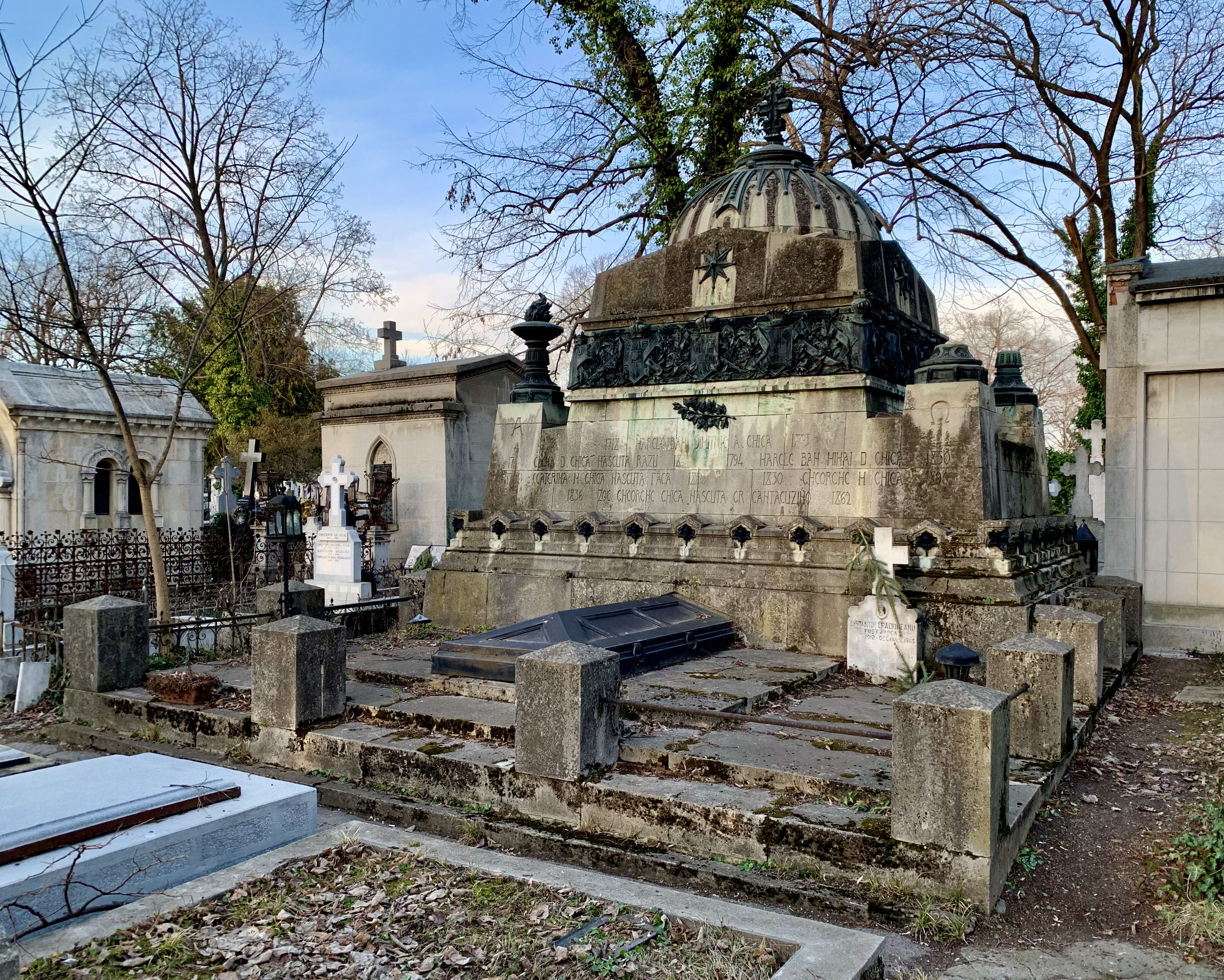
Ghica Family Tomb in the Bellu Cemetery in Bucharest (unknown date)

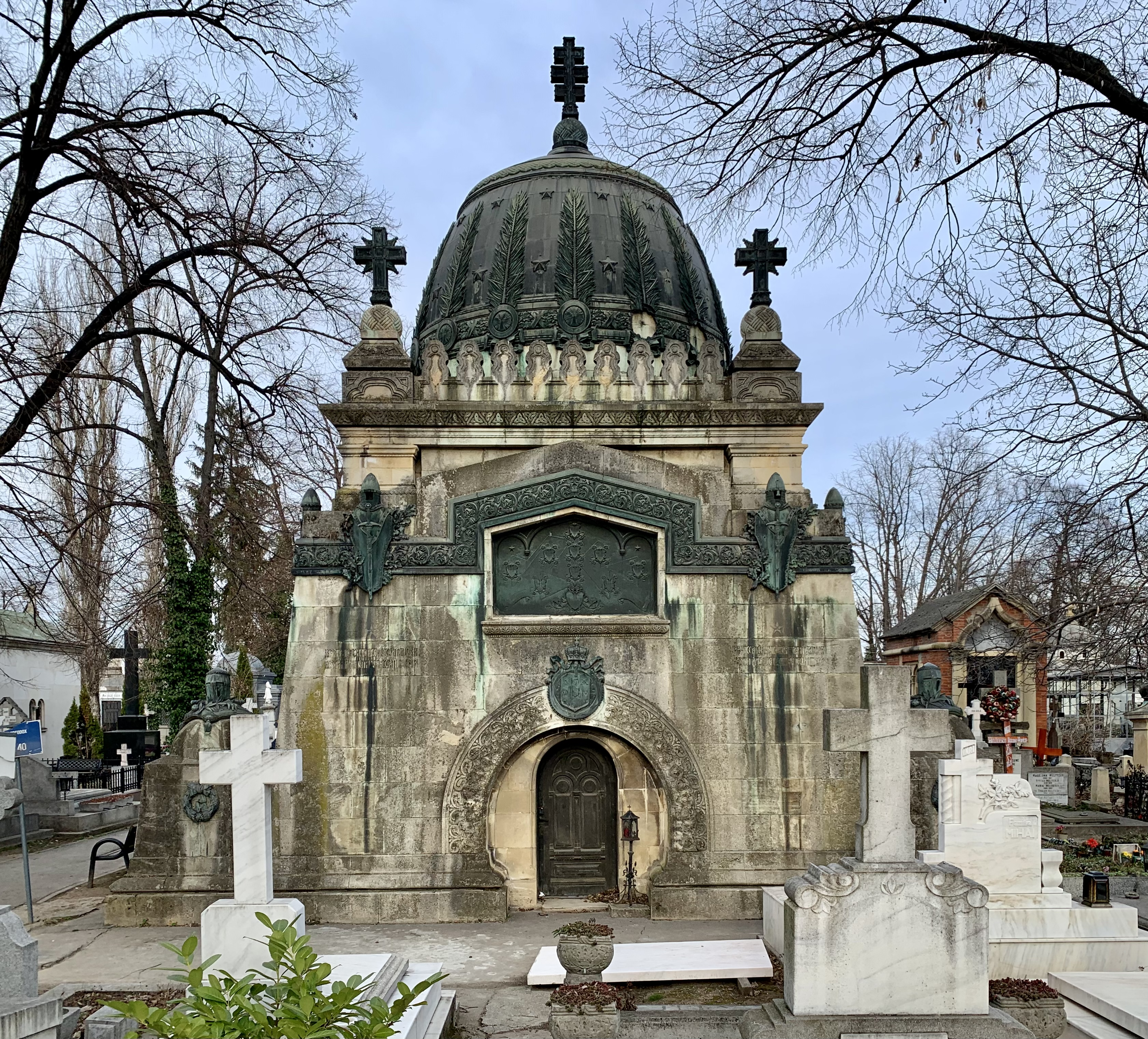
Cantacuzino Tomb in the Bellu Cemetery (unknown date)

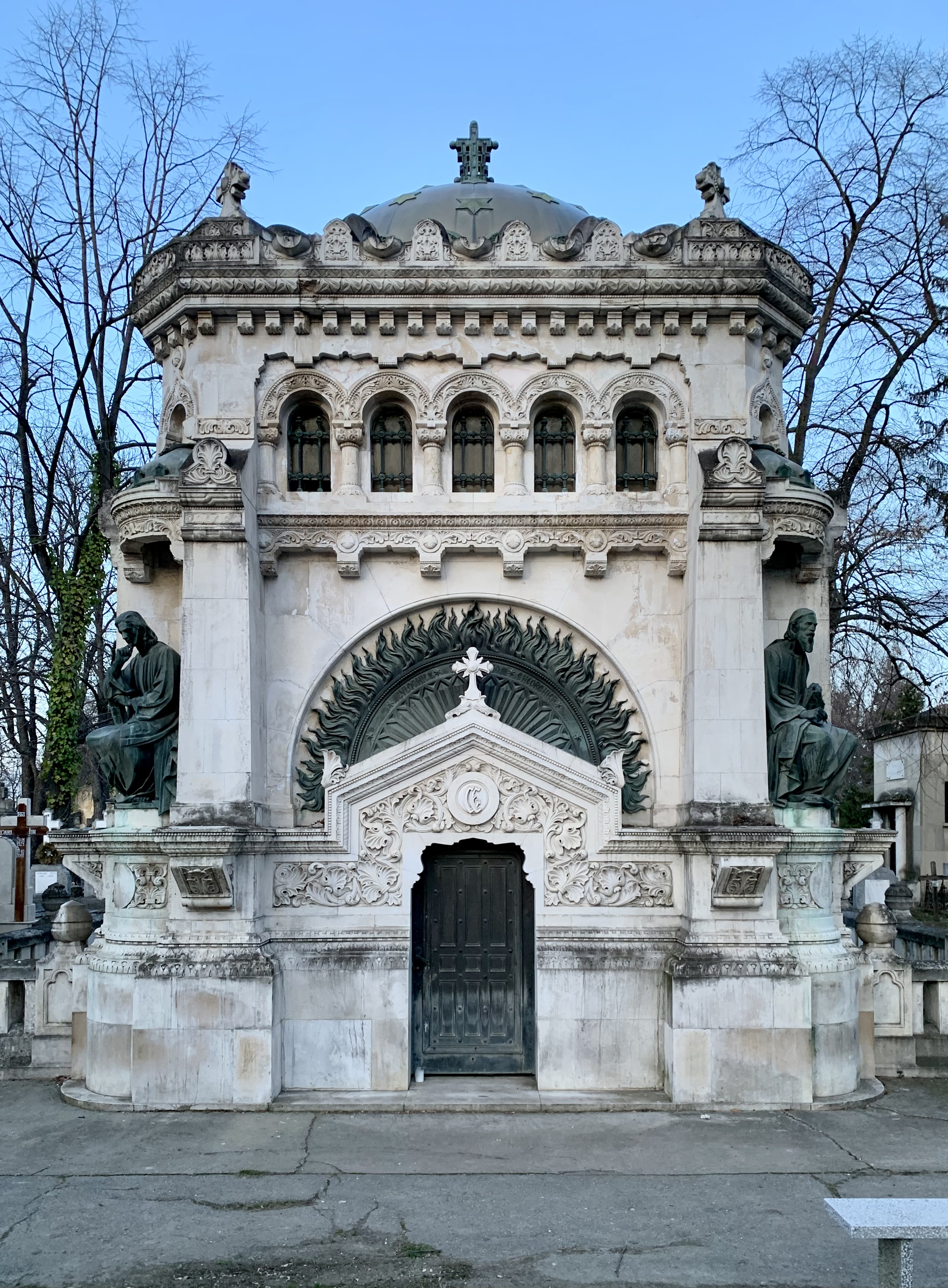
Gheorghieff Brothers Tomb in the Bellu Cemetery (unknown date)

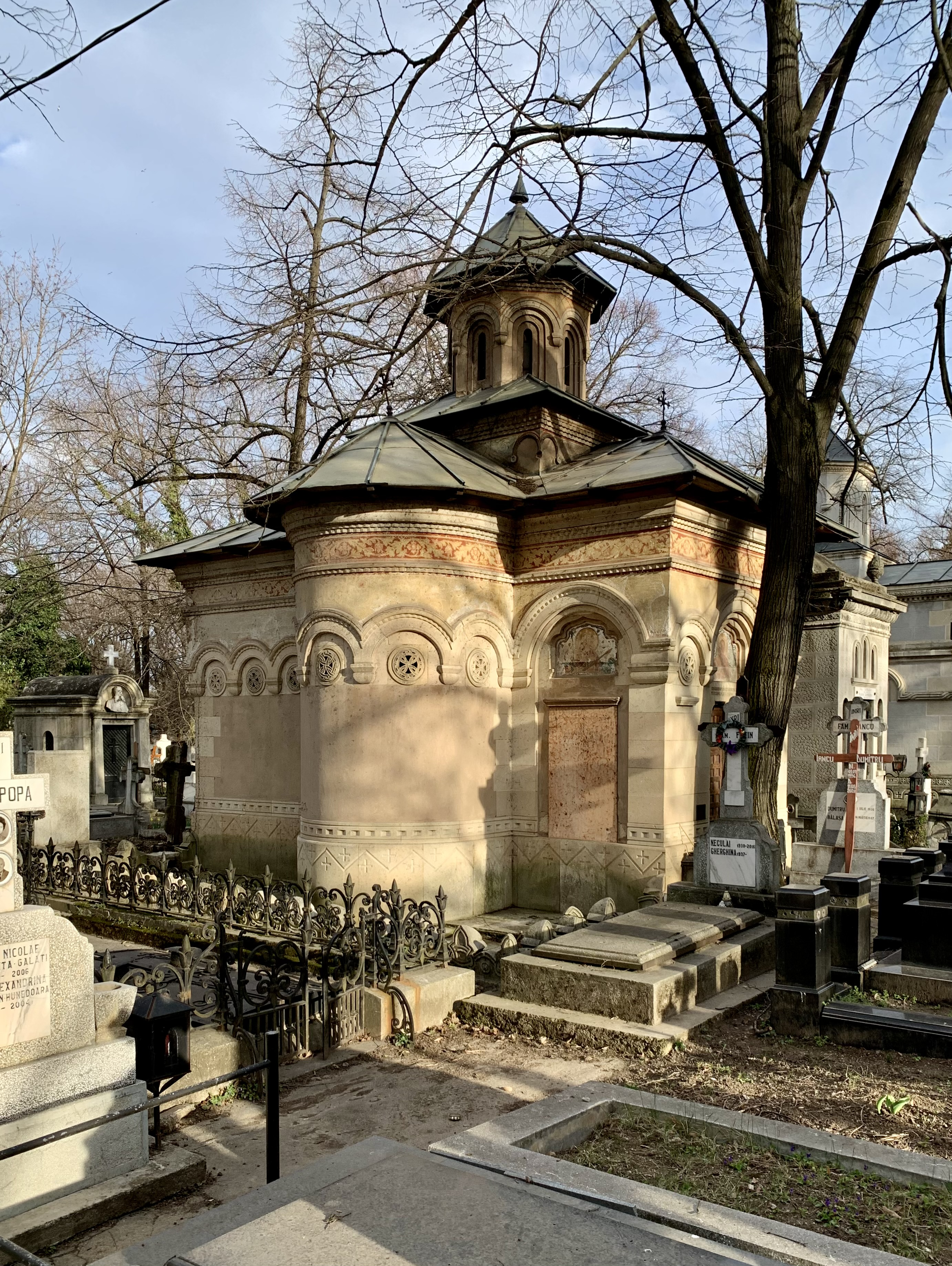
Iacob Lahovary Tomb in the Bellu Cemetery (unknown date)

His first attempts in Bucharest, after his return from studies in Paris, were the Lahovary House (1884–1886), the Kiseleff Roadside Buffet (1889–1892) and the Central Girls' School (1890–1894). They effectively marked the birth of Romanian Revival architecture with all the persistence of eclectic or, in general, historical tendencies. From this point of view, the Buffet is very characteristic, being one of the most successful buildings (initially designed as a Romanian pavilion at the 1889 Paris Universal Exposition), which is, on the whole, in line with the balance of Brâncovenesc architecture. Its most expressive element remains the gazebo: eight wooden pillars, connected with wooden beams, support a large masonry superstructure (trilobate arches in the shape of braces/kokoshniks and a complete entablature). The impression is also accentuated by the strong embossed ornamentation, made of polychrome glazed ceramics. Above the protruding cornice of the ceramic entablature, wooden pieces appear again: the ends of the transverse beams and the corbels that hold the very wide eaves of the roof. And as important spaces remain visible between the beams and corbels, the roof - large, high and covered with tiles - seems suspended. Eclectic elements appear in the ceramic ornamentation: Classicist geometric motifs or Renaissance floral motifs (but interpreted wavy, in the Art Nouveau spirit), which cover the entire surface of the gazebo masonry and the technique itself, of the high relief, colored in white, blue and ocher, of the Luca della Robbia type, contrasts with the relative sobriety of the old Romanian architecture from which, obviously, it started. Thus, the Buffet has a happy, lively and, especially, Romanian air.

=== Petre Antonescu ===
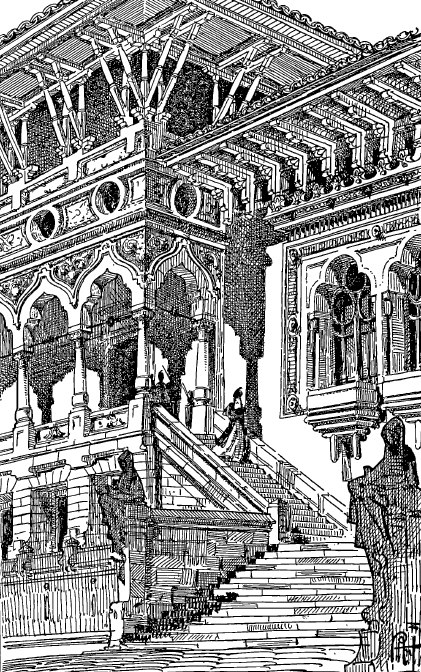
Study of Romanian Revival architecture for the Exhibition of Artistic Youth (1904)

The Bucharest City Hall (1906-1910), Bulevardul Regina Elisabeta no. 47

The Palace of Navigation in Galați (1912), Strada Portului no. 34

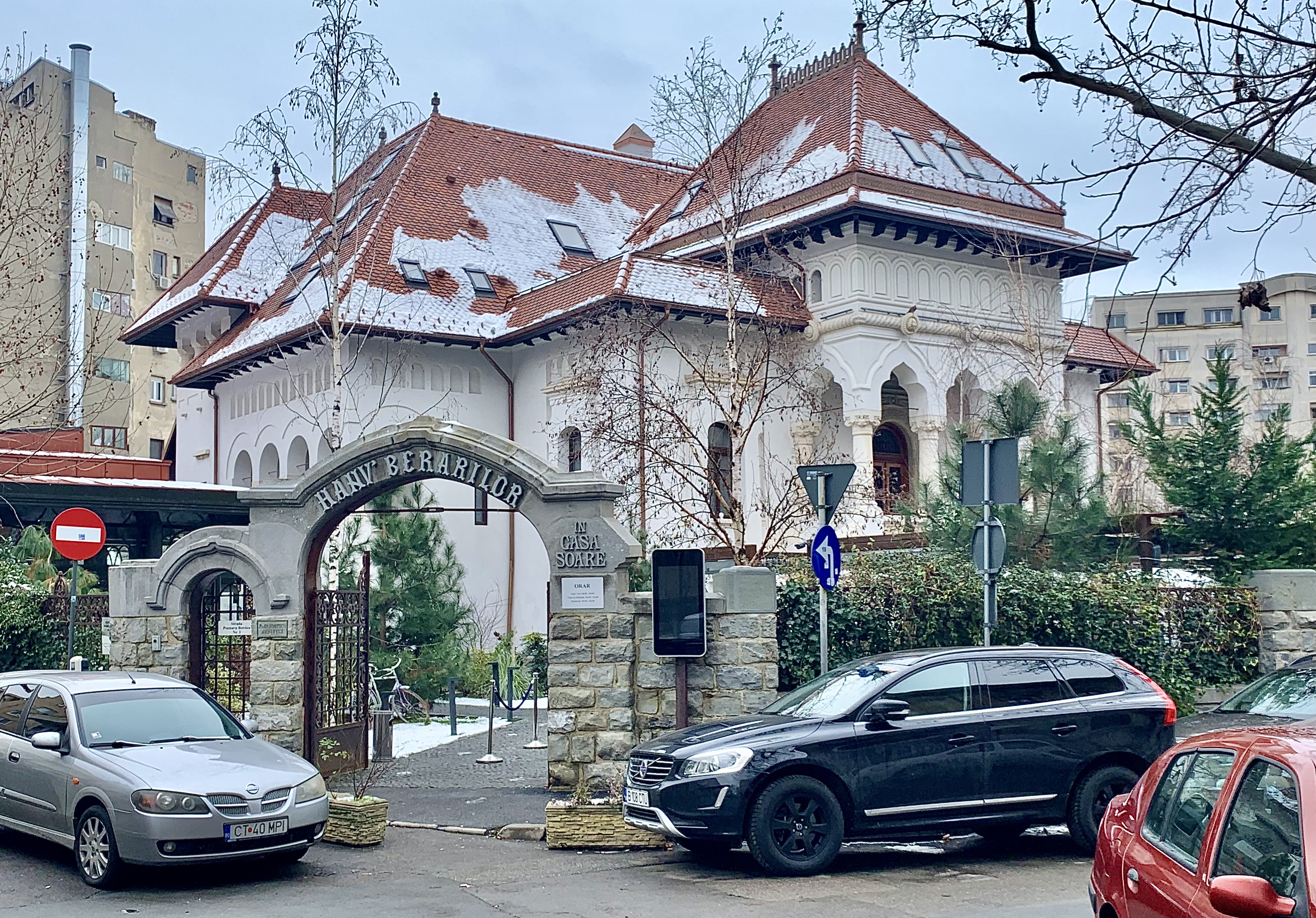
The Oprea Soare House in Bucharest (1914), Strada Poenaru Bordea no. 2

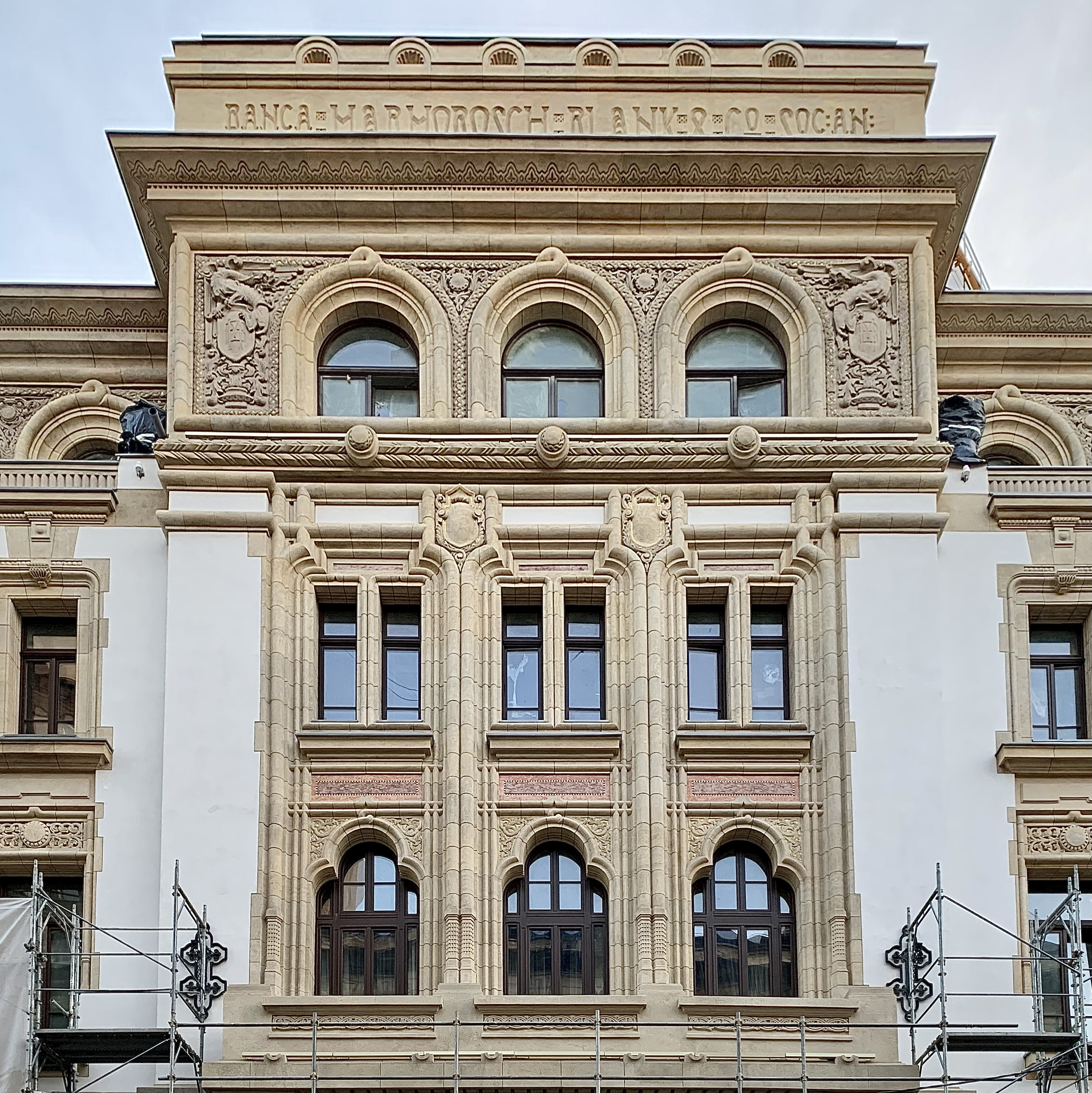
Part of the façade of the Marmorosch Blank Bank Palace in Bucharest (1915–1923), Strada Doamnei no. 2-6

The Saint Nicholas Orthodox Cathedral in Galați (1906–1917), with Byzantine Revival influences

One of the most vigorous and typical representatives of Romanian Revival architecture was Petre Antonescu. He studied (1893–1898) at the Beaux-Arts de Paris, then became a professor, and later rector of the Academy of Architecture in Bucharest. His works include houses, such as the Vintilă Brătianu House (Strada Aurel Vlaicu no. 19) or the Oprea Soare House (Strada Poenaru Bordea no. 2), all built in Bucharest before World War I; and more extensive programs such as the old Ministry of Construction (the current Bucharest City Hall, Bulevardul Regina Elisabeta no. 47) or the Marmorosch Blank Bank Palace (2-6 Strada Doamnei). It combines a series of elements that belong to either the international or the local repertoire: monumental plinths with large bossages, massive pieces (columns and corbels, and keystones, oversized) often with a purely decorative function, suggesting archaic or rustic buildings; reliefs mix national inspiration (Moldovan window ornaments, capitals and balustrades of Brâncovenesc inspiration, etc), with those of the symbolic European heraldic repertoire (shields, dragons, eagles, griffins, shells, etc); as well as traditional forms of gaps, trilobate or in brace/kokoshniks, mixed with other ones, semicircular, retreating portals, of Romanesque or Renaissance proportions and profile, etc. This process does not completely protect the work from eclecticism, but the ansamble still tilts the balance towards a national physiognomy.

== In other art media ==
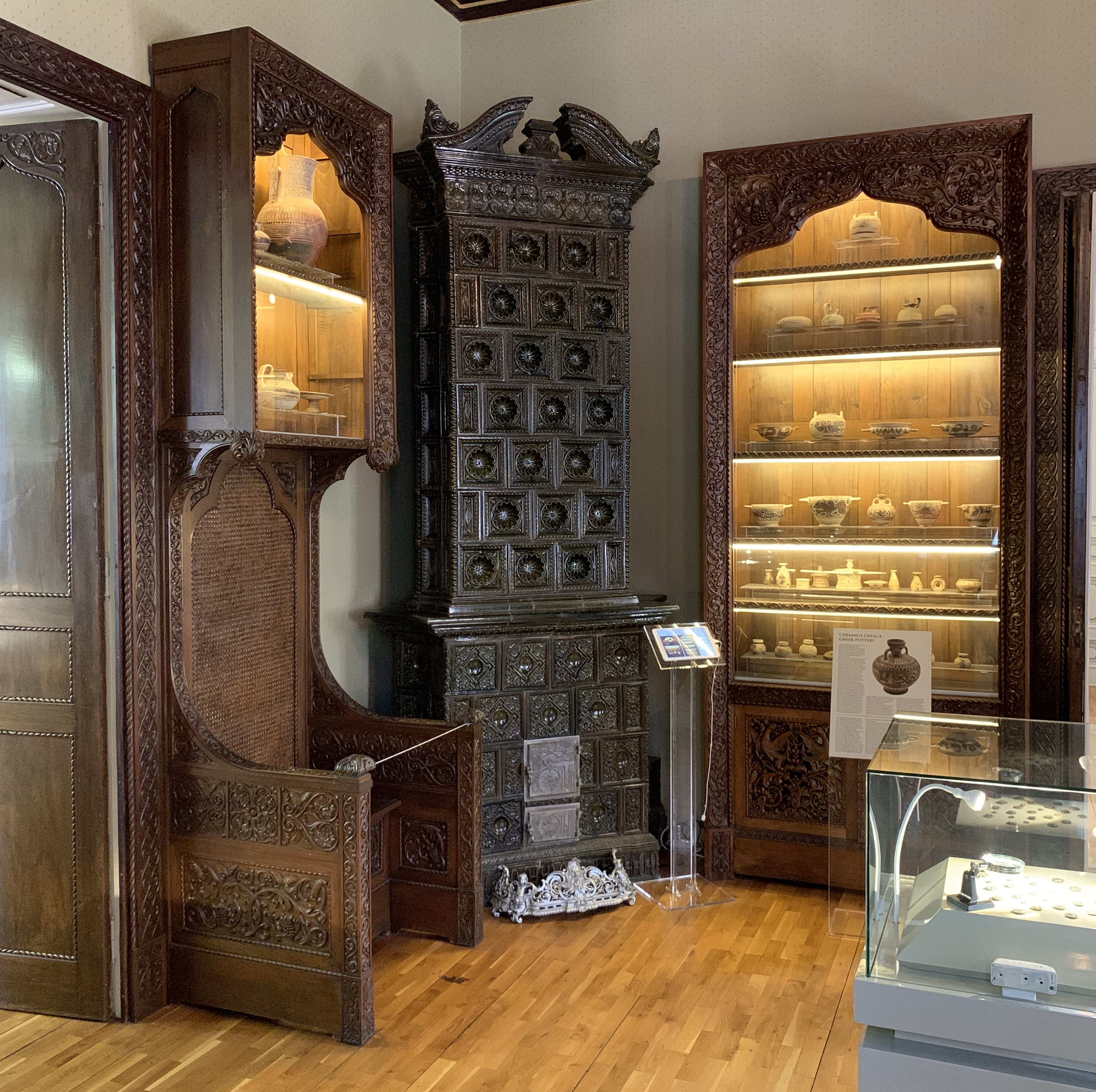
Romanian Revival display cases in the George Severeanu Museum, Bucharest, in which Ancient ceramic is exhibited, unknown designer, unknown date, wood and glass

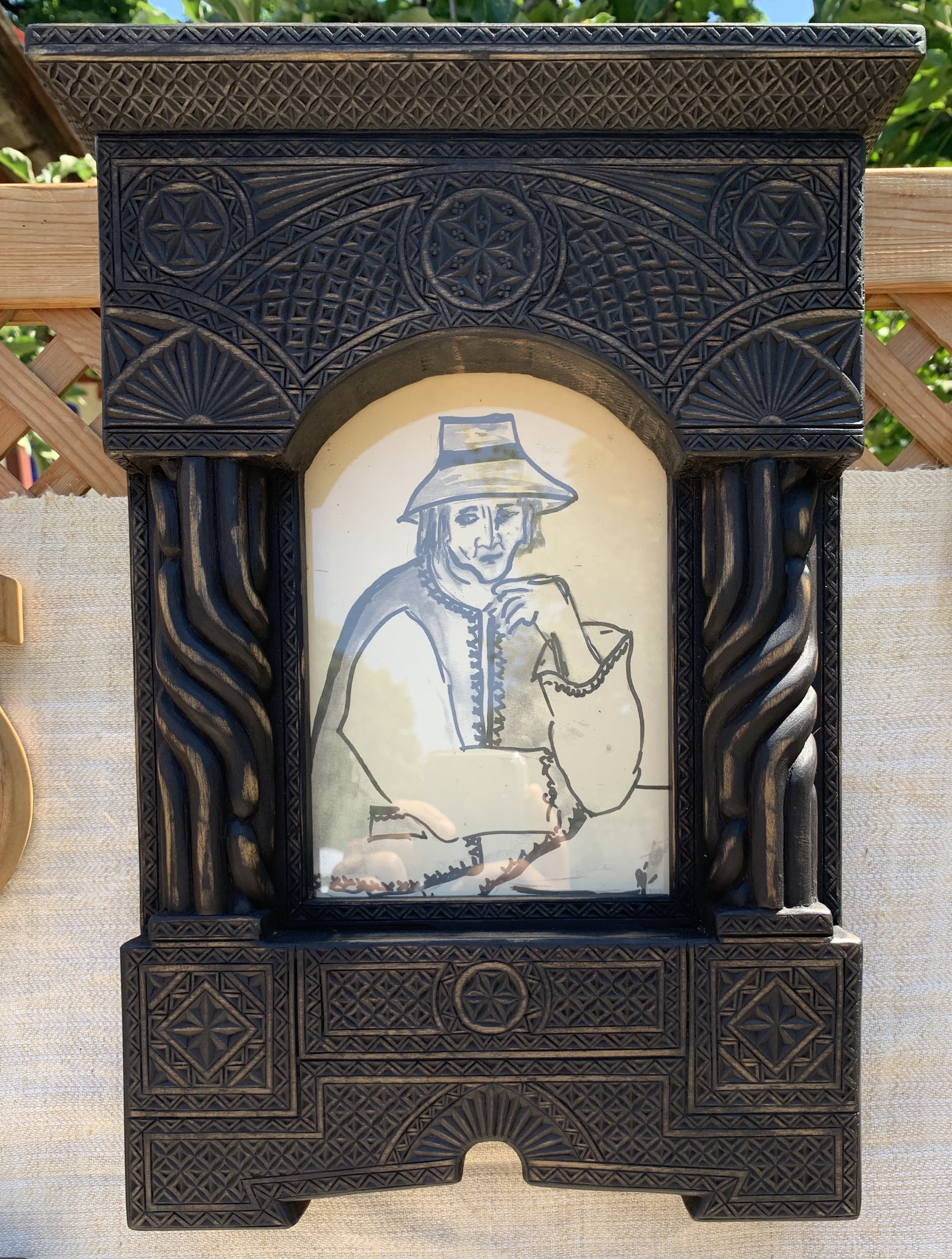
Picture frame sold in the Dimitrie Gusti National Village Museum, Bucharest, unknown designer, unknown date, wood

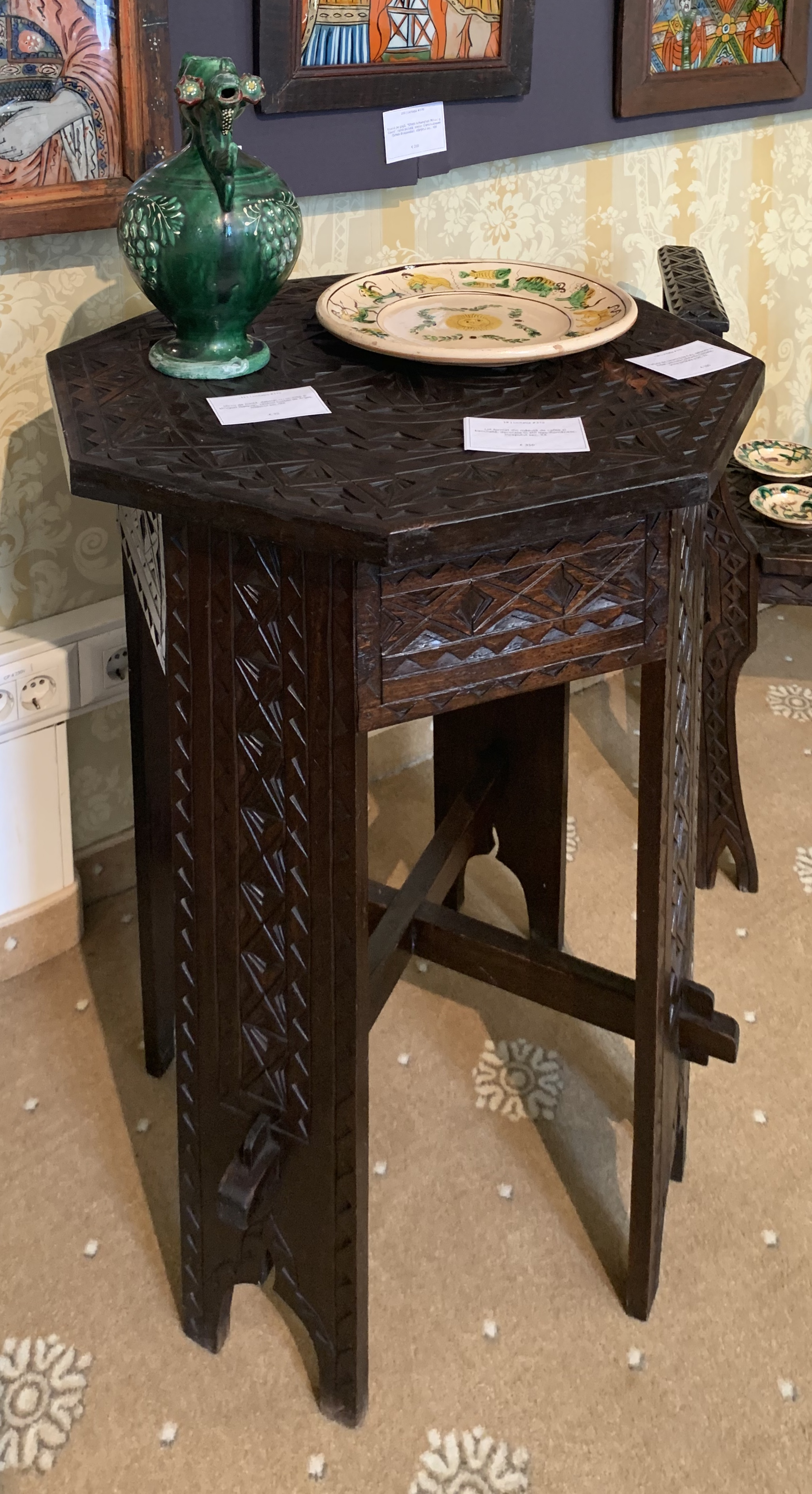
Coffee table, unknown designer, early 20th century, wood

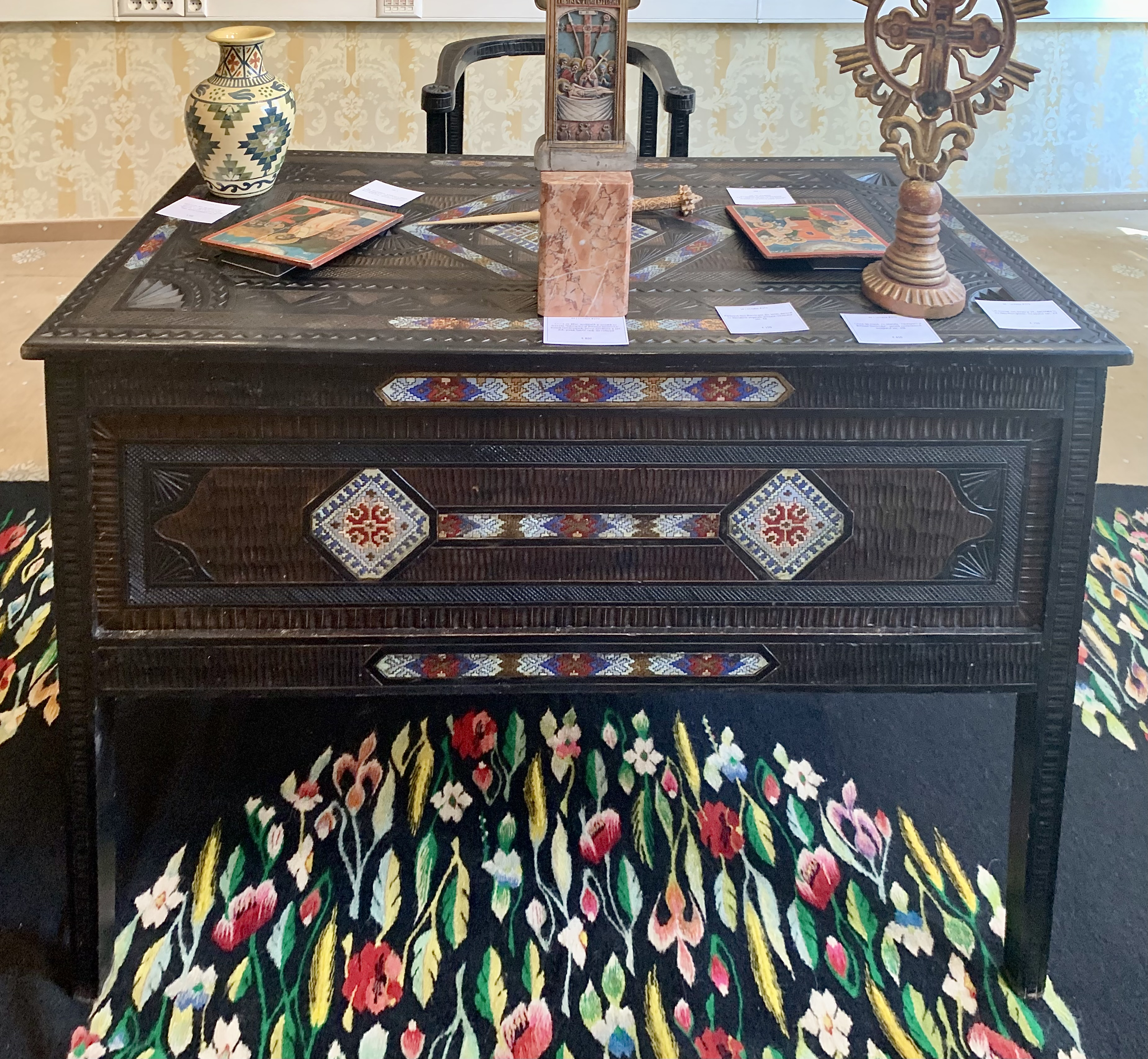
Desk, unknown designer, early 20th century, wood

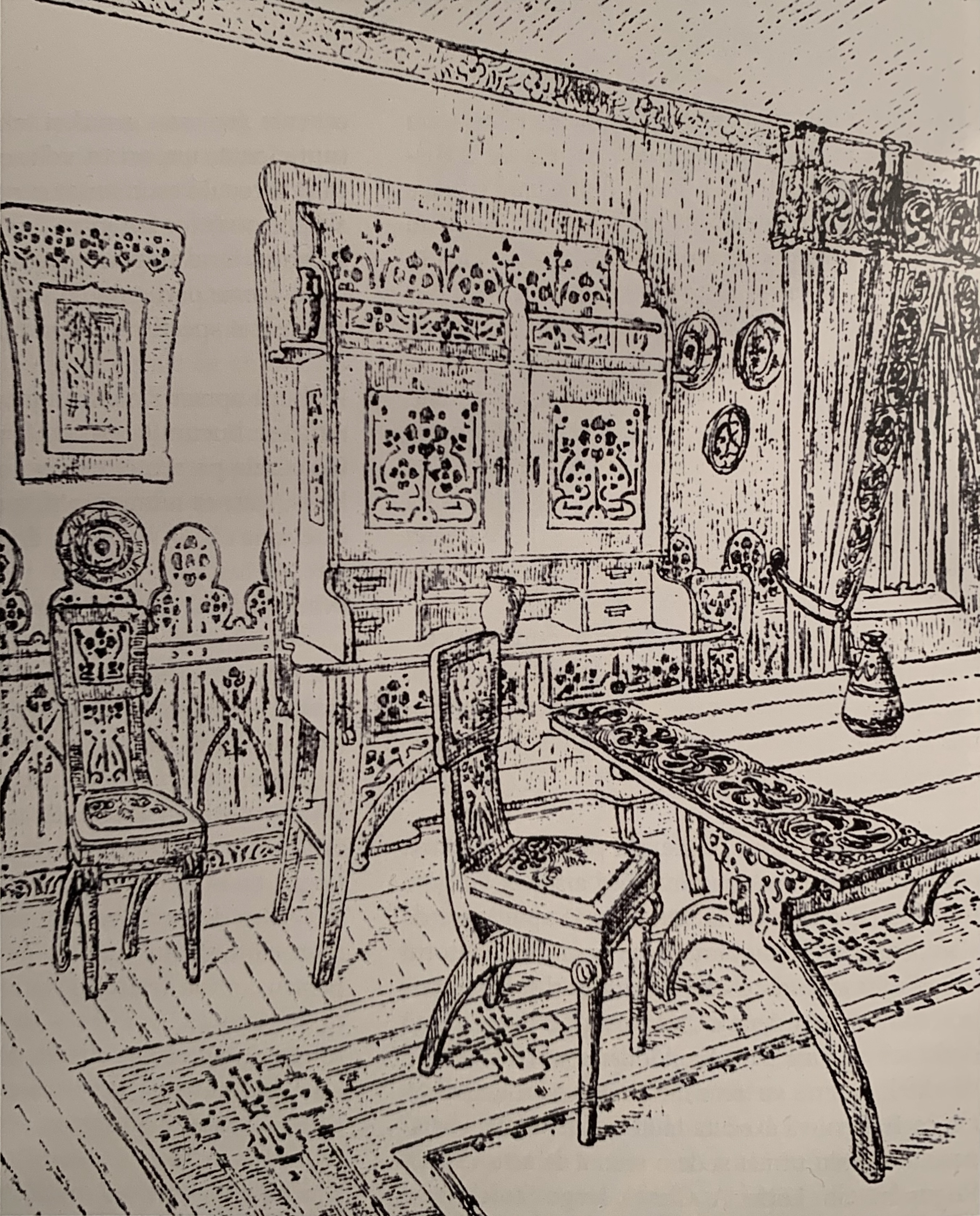
Design for living room furniture, by Nicolae Ghica-Budești, 1906, ink on paper

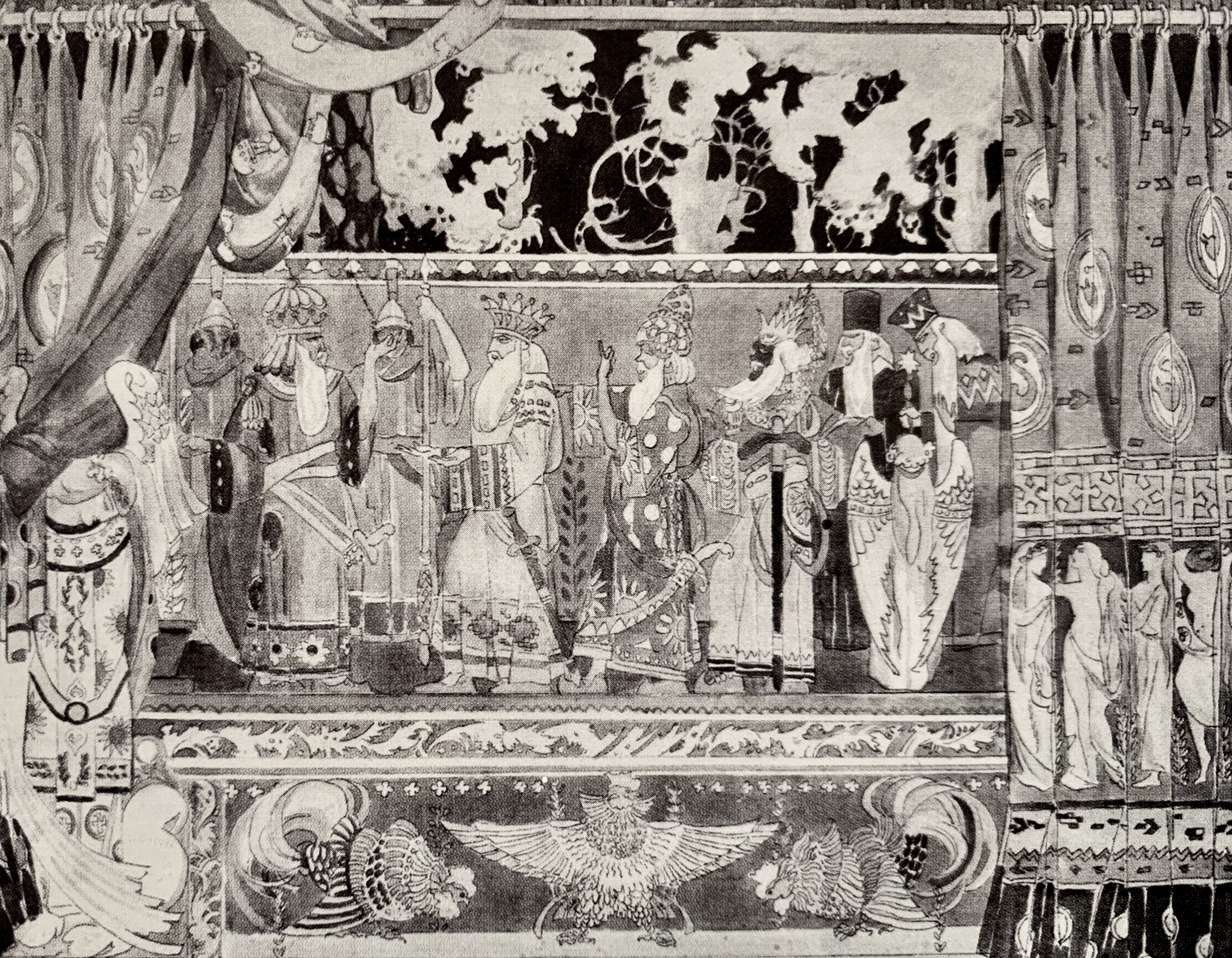
Curtain design, by Ion Theodorescu-Sion, unknown date, watercolour

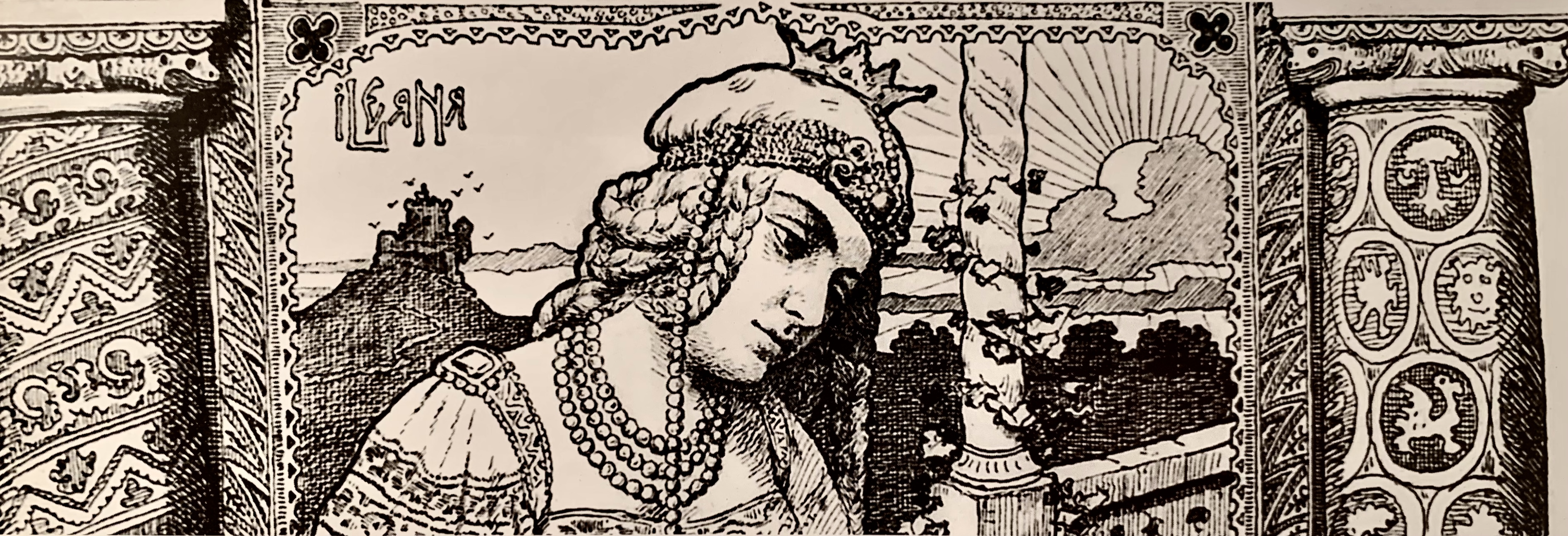
Illustration for the Ileana magazine, by Ludovic Basarab, unknown date, ink on paper

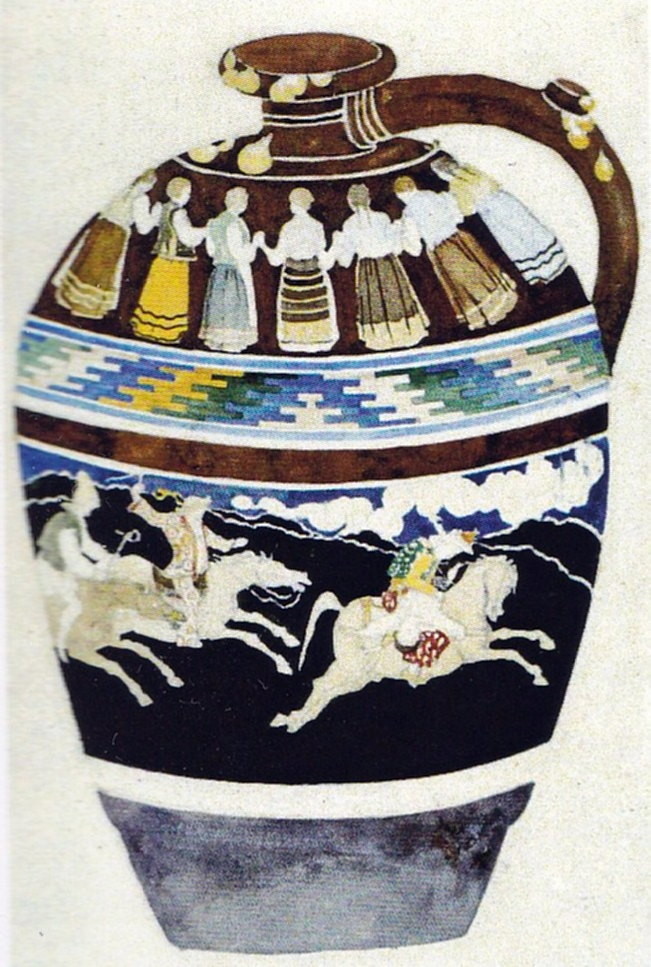
Vessel design, by Apcar Baltazar, unknown date, watercolour

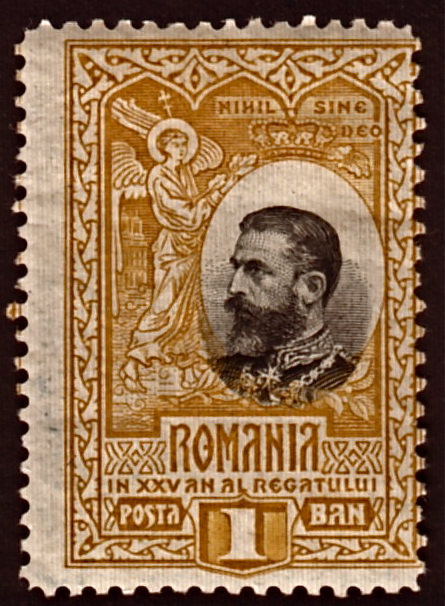
Stamp with king Carol I, unknown illustrator, 1906, ink on paper

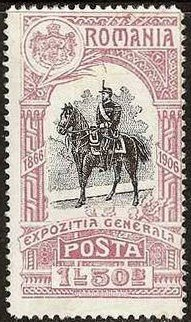
Stamp with king Carol I, unknown illustrator, 1906, ink on paper

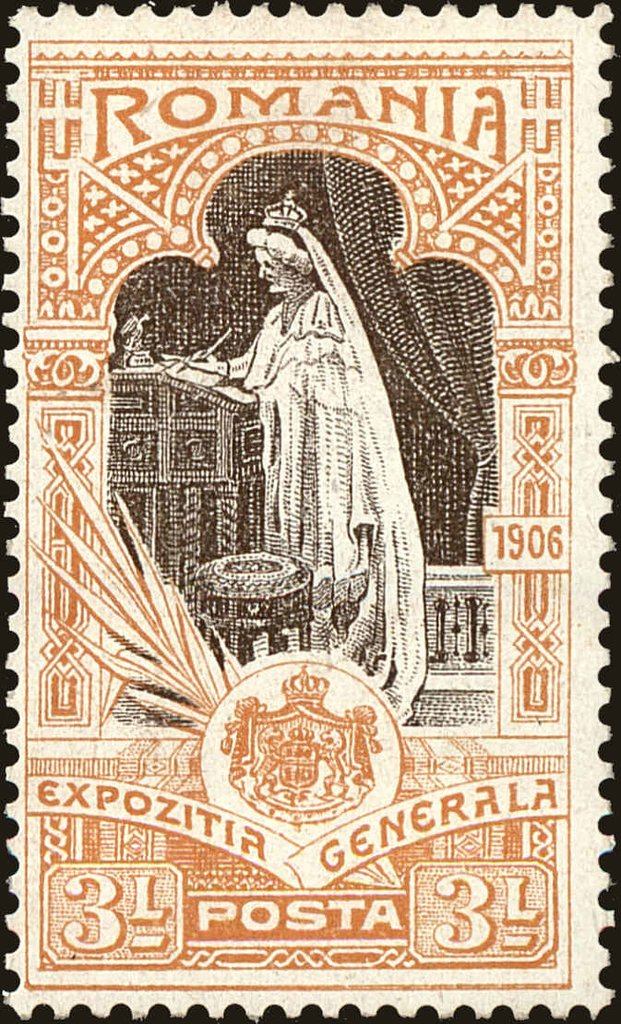
Stamp with queen Elisabeth, by C. Stengel, 1906, ink on paper

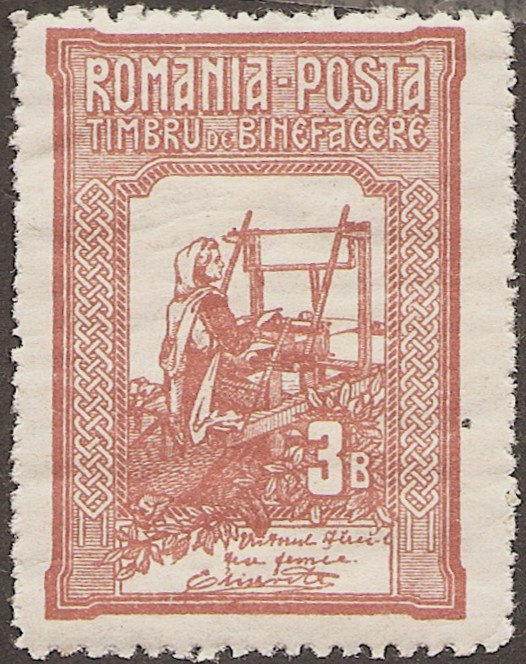
Stamp with queen Elisabeth weaving, by C. Stengel, 1906, ink on paper

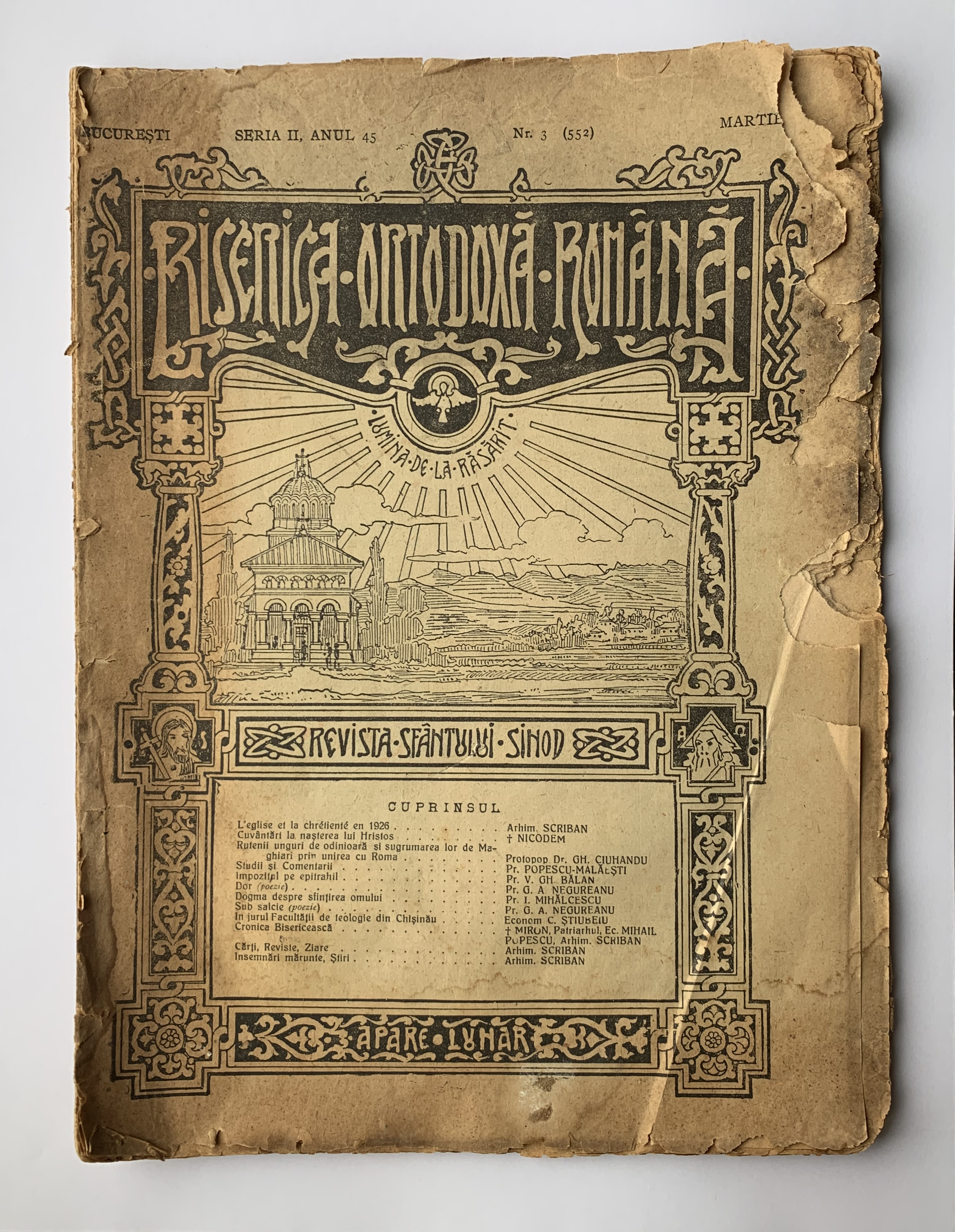
The Magazine of the Holy Synod from March 1927, unknown illustrator, ink on paper

In addition to architecture, the Romanian Revival style manifested itself in other media, including graphic design, pottery, furniture and illustration. There are good examples of Romanian Romanian furniture in the George Severeanu Museum in Bucharest, mostly display cases, where ancient Greek and Etruscan vessels are exhibited.

Besides buildings, architect Nicolae Ghica-Budești also produced Romanian Revival furniture. His example followed by artists like O. Roguschi, Gh. Lupu, A. Clevel, Hugo Storck, who made furniture in this style. During the 1900s, Apcar Baltazar is preoccupied with the creating a new Romanian style in decorative arts. In November 1908, an essay called "Spre un stil românesc" (Towards a Romanian style) is published in the Viața Românească (Romanian Life) magazine. Using example from world art history, he tries to find ideas for his creation and for how an authentic Romanian style should look like. As a key feature of this style, he recommends elements of Byzantine art, present in medieval Romanian architecture. He was an advocate for introducing them in a harmonious way, not straight up copying. Baltazar was also an admirer of both peasant and religious art. A motif he used in multiple designs is the stylized rooster.

Al. Tzigara-Samurcaș was a militant for the conservation of traditional peasant art. He was also an influence for Apcar Baltazar.

== Periods ==
In general, architectural styles popular in a period tend to influence each other, sometimes leading to mixes. The Romanian Revival is no exception. Because of this, the year when many buildings were erected can be approximated more or less easily.

=== Early (before 1906) ===
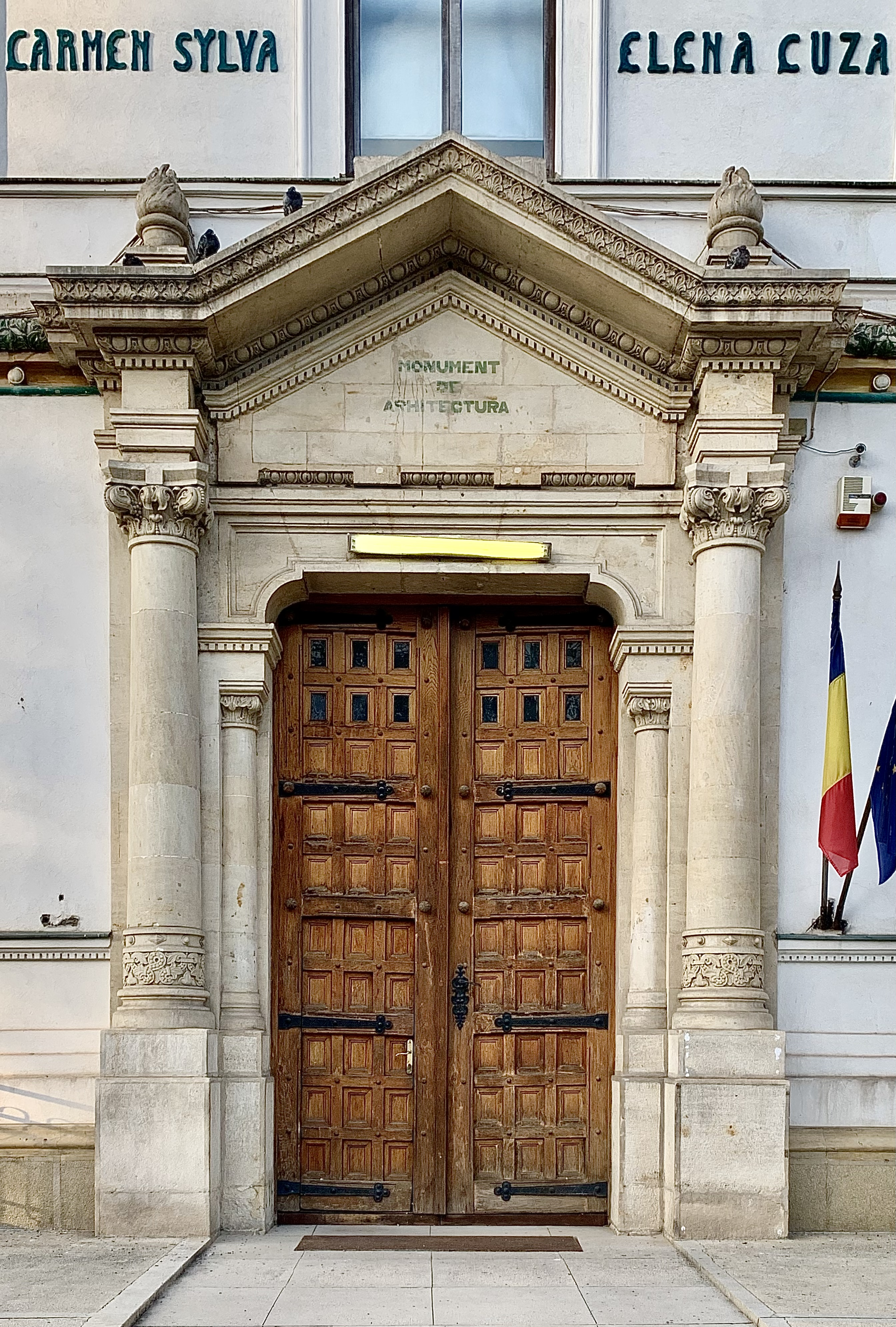
Entrance of the Central Girls' School, Bucharest, by Ion Mincu, 1890. Notice the pediment above the door, that makes this entrance similar to one of a Neoclassical building

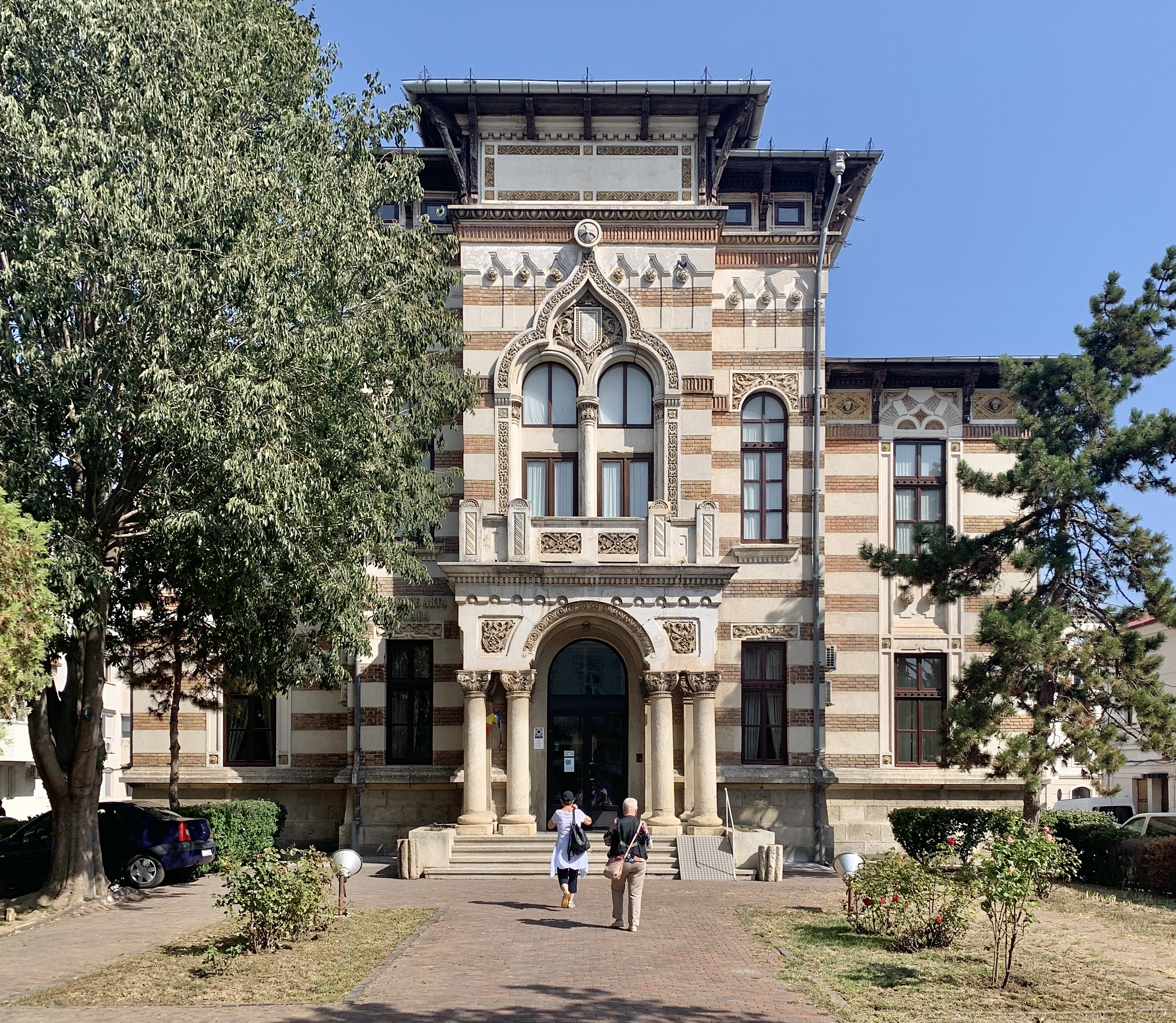
Folk Art Museum, Constanța, Romania, 1893 unknown architect. The complex foliage spirals (aka rinceaux) may have been inspired by Islamic architecture

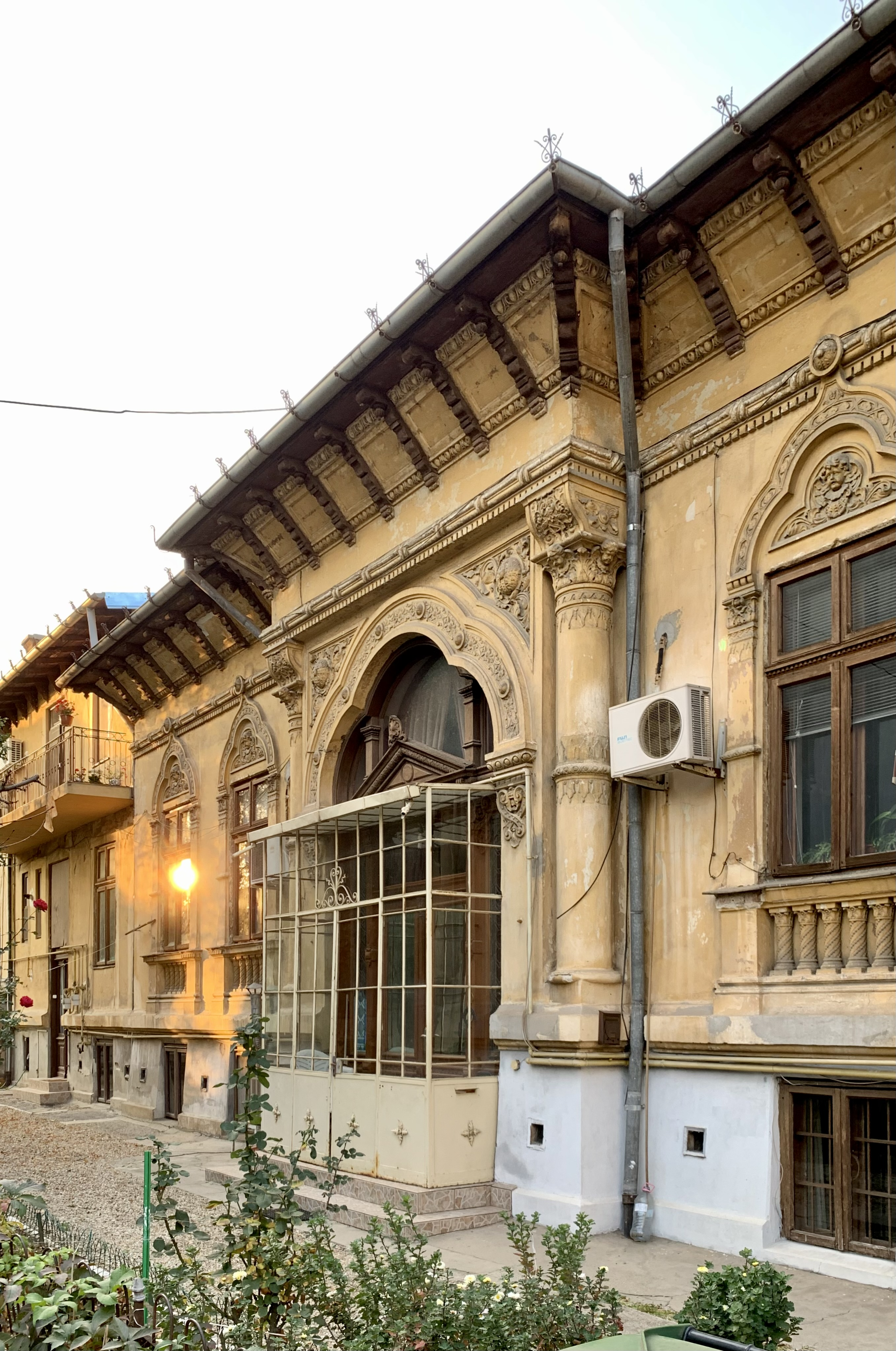
Strada Polonă no. 13, Bucharest, c.1900, unknown architect. Notice how highly decorated this house is. Also, the small brown wooden pediment above the door is fully Neoclassical

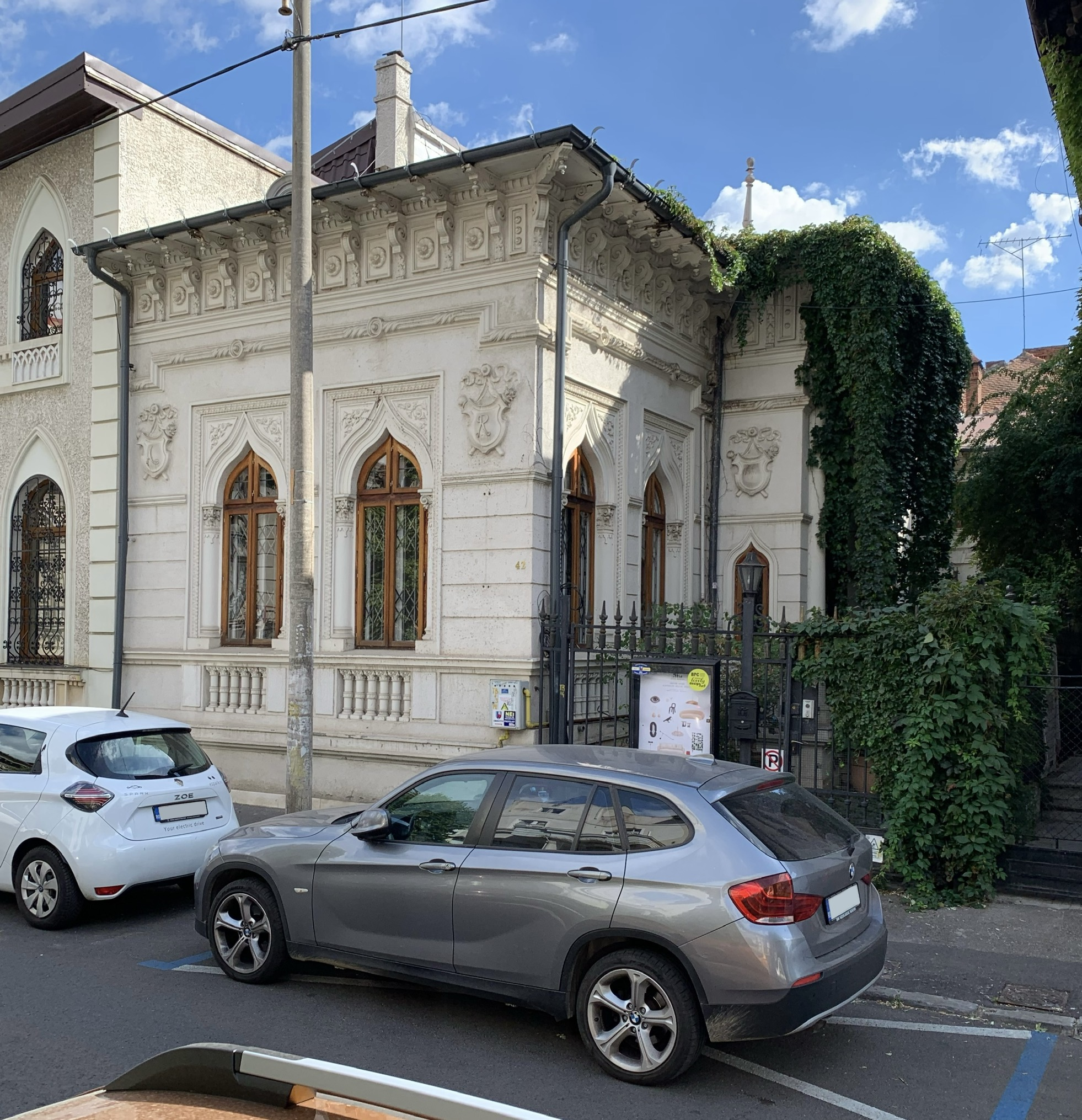
Strada Grigore Alexandrescu no. 42, Bucharest, c.1900, unknown architect. This house is a mix of Romanian Revival and Beaux-Arts architecture. The shape of the windows may have been inspired by the Islamic the world

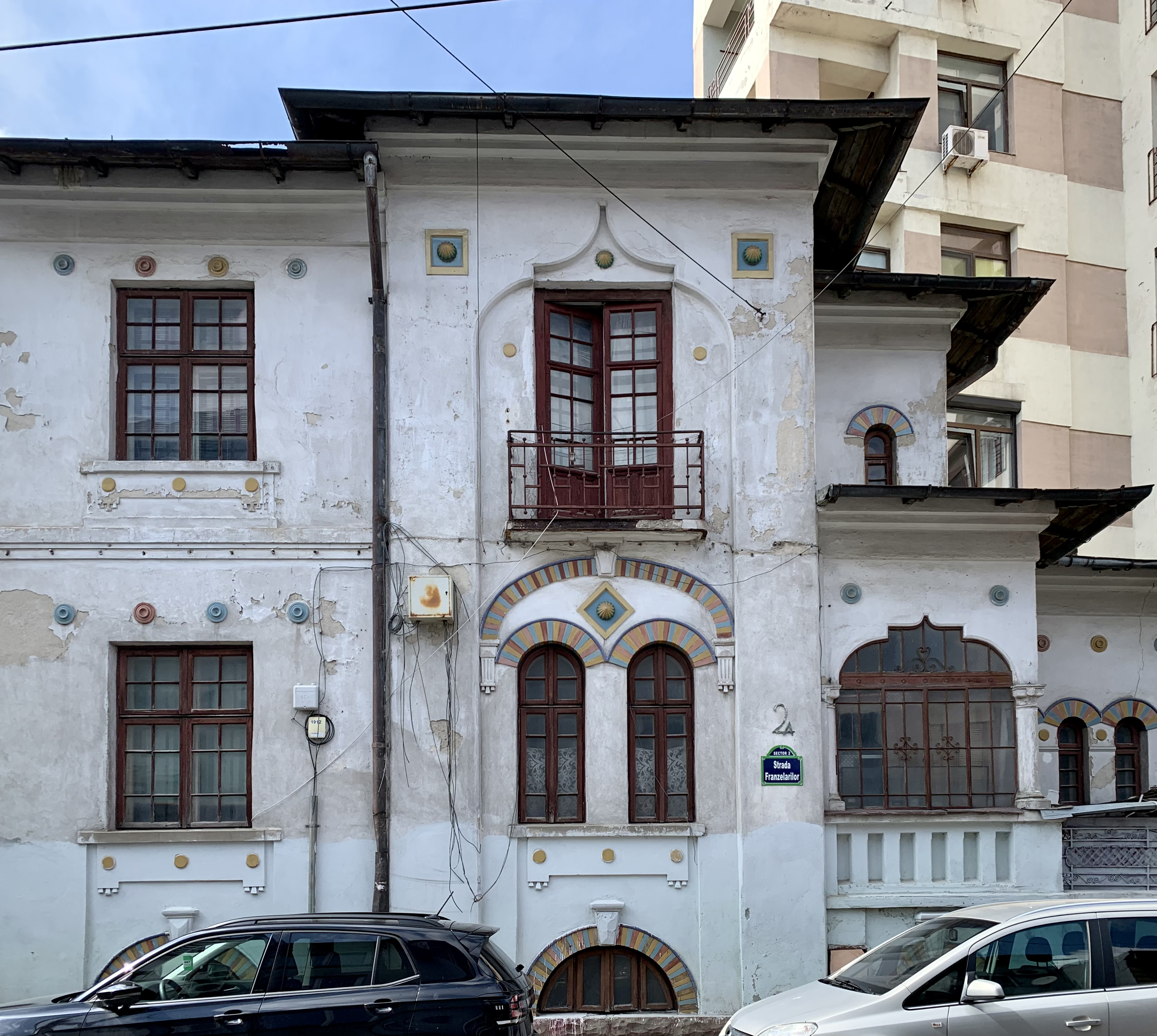
Strada Franzelarilor no. 2A, Bucharest, unknown architect, c.1900. This house stands out through its polychrome glazed ceramic ornaments, similar to the ones of some churches from Moldavia, like the Saint Nicholas Princely Church in Iași

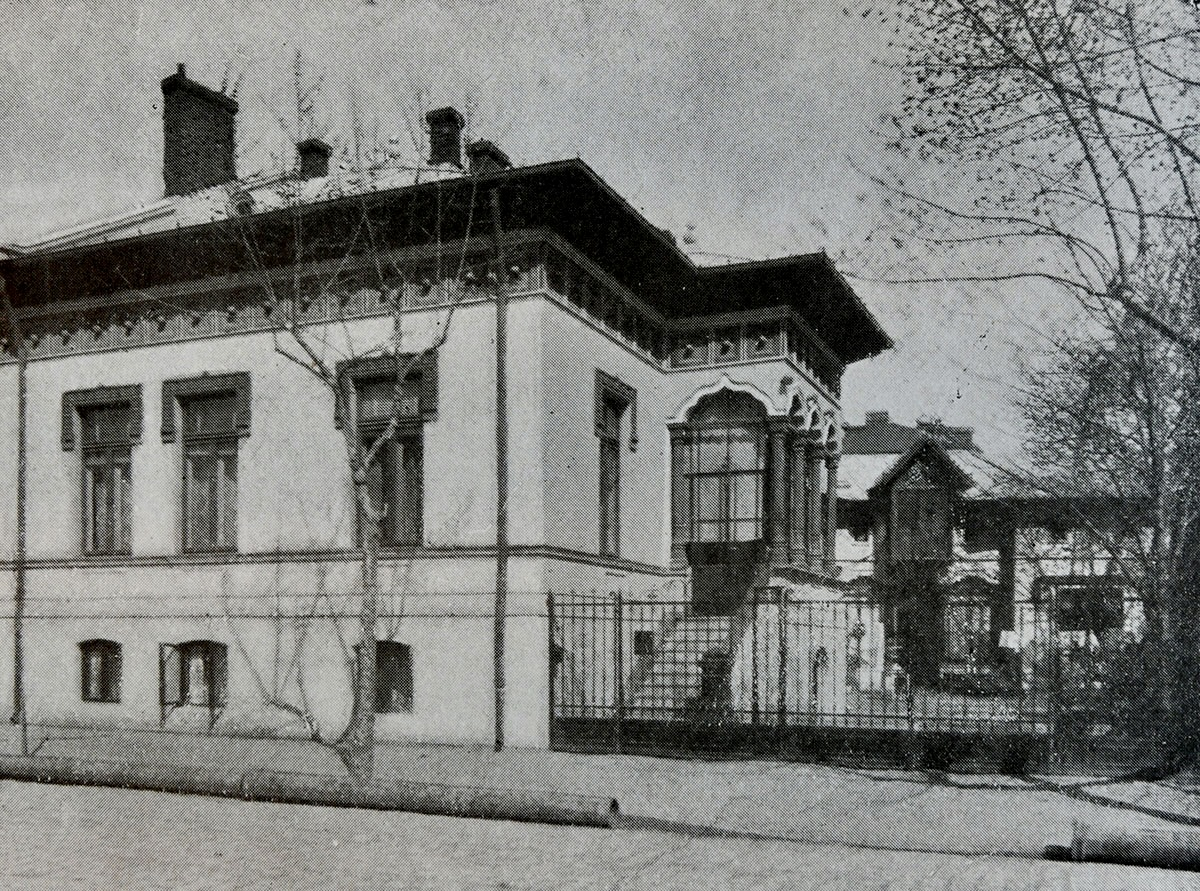
Diamandi House, Bucharest, unknown architect, c.1900. While all the ornaments are Romanian Revival, the structure of the house is specific to the Belle Époque: a house with three or two windows towards the street, garden, entrance in the garden, and only one story high

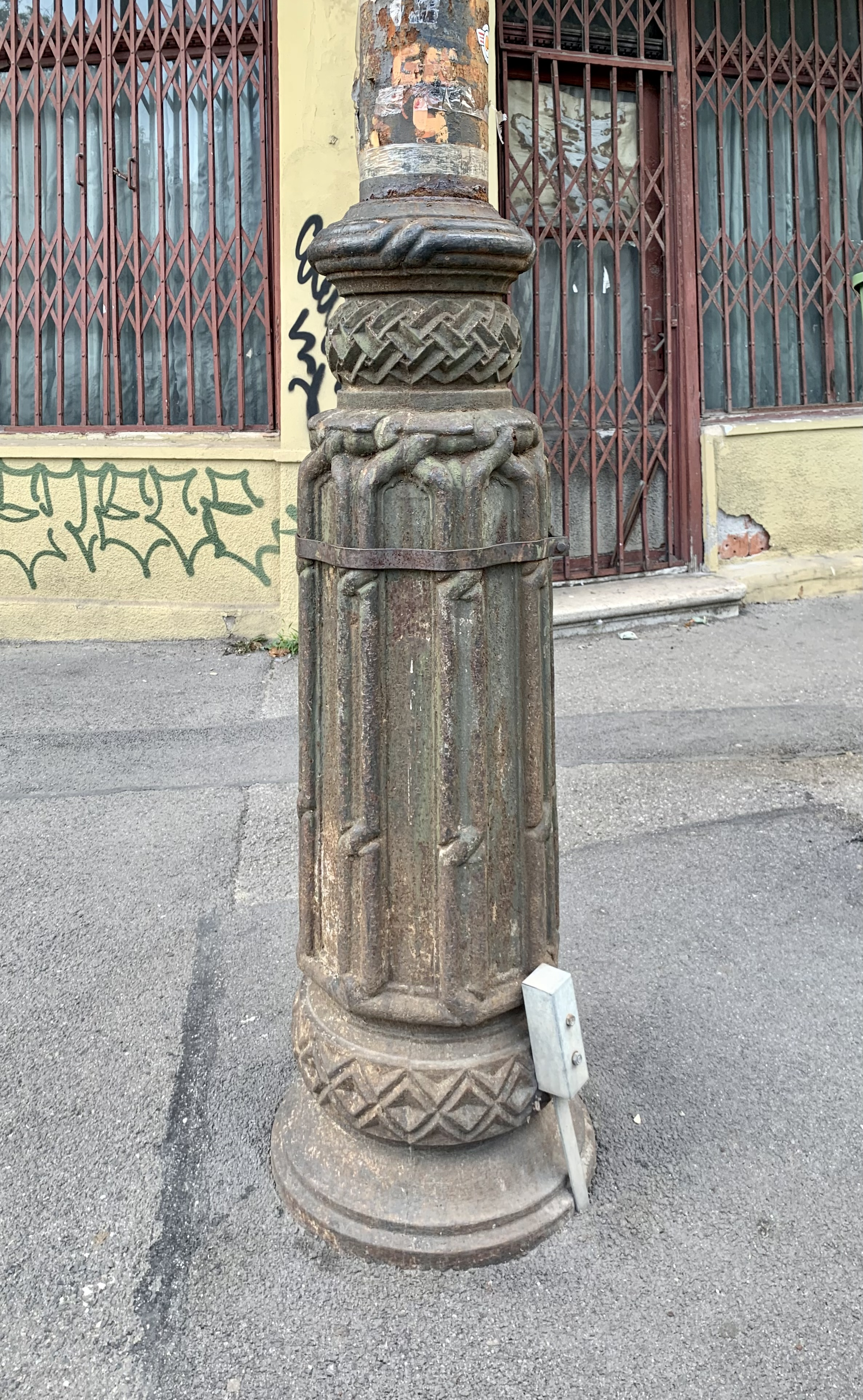
Base of a Romanian Revival lighting pole at the intersection of Streets Popa Tatu and Mircea Vulcănescu, Bucharest, unknown architect, c.1900

The Belle Époque is the period in which the style was created. Because it was not fully defined until the 1906 General Romanian Exhibition in the Carol Park, Romanian Revival buildings before 1906 can look quite different one from another, especially those of the 1890s. Architects looked for inspiration in multiple sources. Some were inspired by the Islamic world, more specifically by the Ottoman influences on traditional Romanian architecture. Others were influenced more by the Brâncovenesc style, popular in Wallachia in the early 18th century. In his creations, Ion Mincu mixed intentionally or not intentionally Neoclassical, Beaux-Arts and Gothic Revival elements. For example, the Central Girls' School has an entrance with a pediment above it, similarly with what you would find at a Neoclassical building. The Romanian Revival of the Belle Époque is also more decorated compared to the later phases of the style.

=== Mature (1906-early 1930s) ===
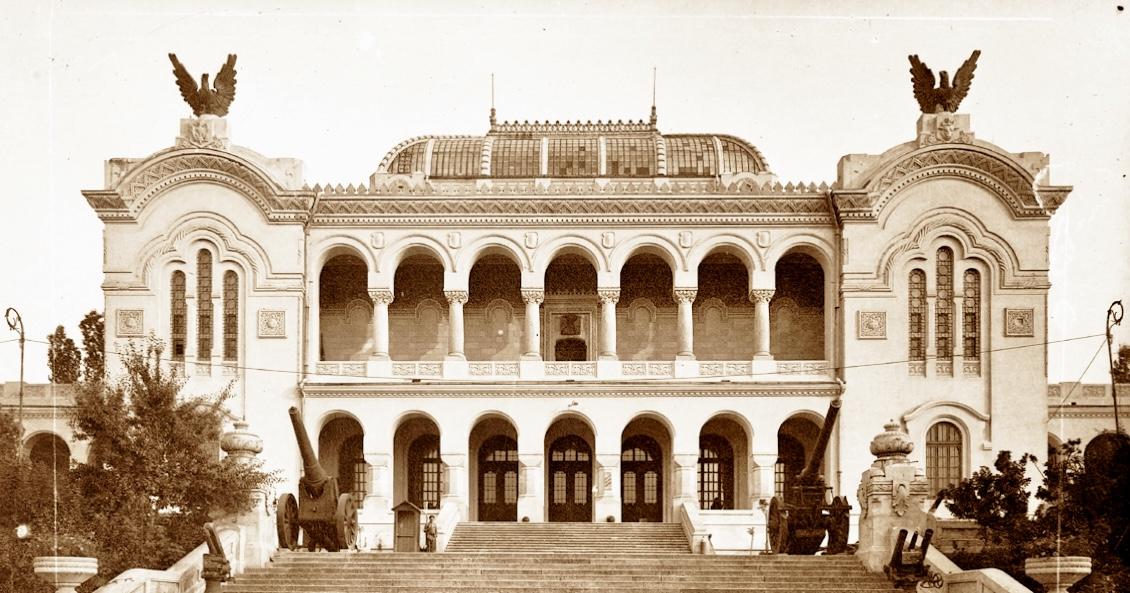
Palace of the Arts, part of the 1906 General Romanian Exhibition in the Carol Park, Bucharest, by Victor Ștefănescu and Ștefan Burcuș, 1905-1906

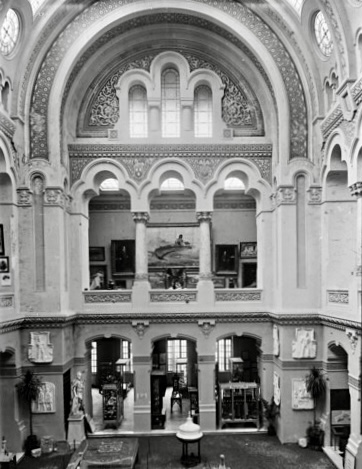
Interior of the Palace of the Arts, by Victor Ștefănescu and Ștefan Burcuș, 1905-1906

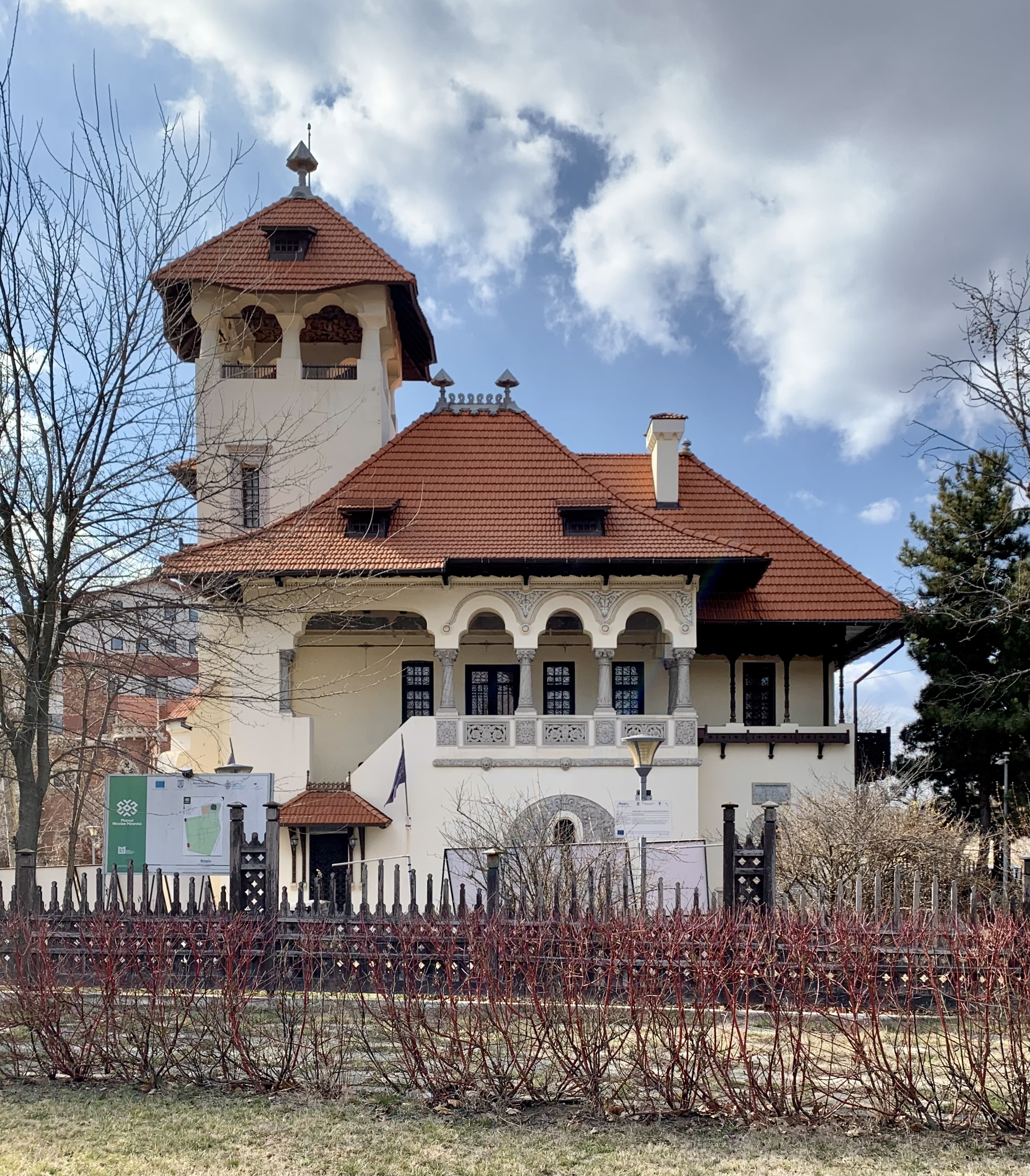
Nicolae Minovici House, today the Nicolae Minovici Folk Art Museum, Bucharest, by Cristofi Cerchez, 1906-1907

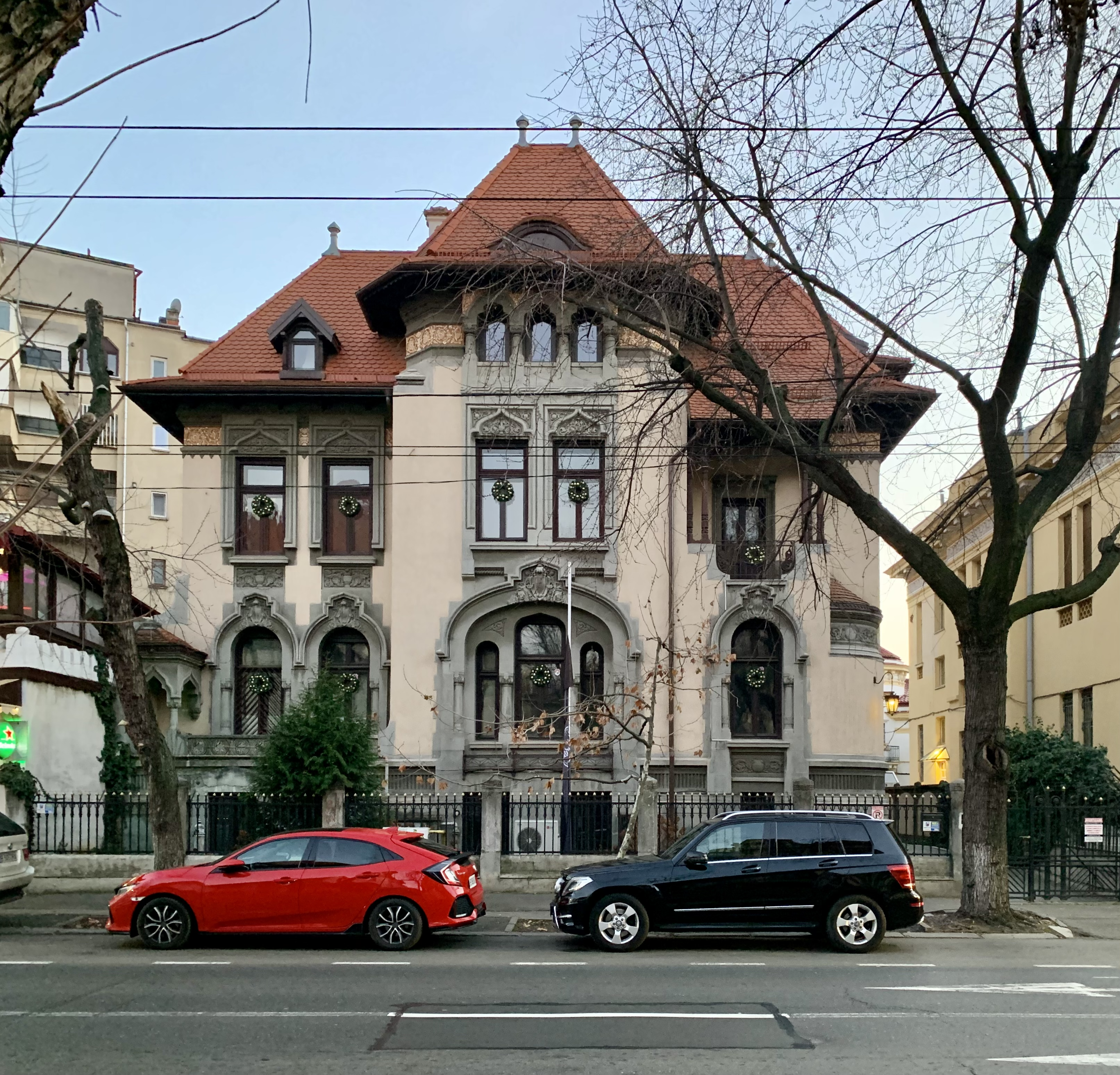
A. Mincu House, Bucharest, by Arghir Culina, 1910

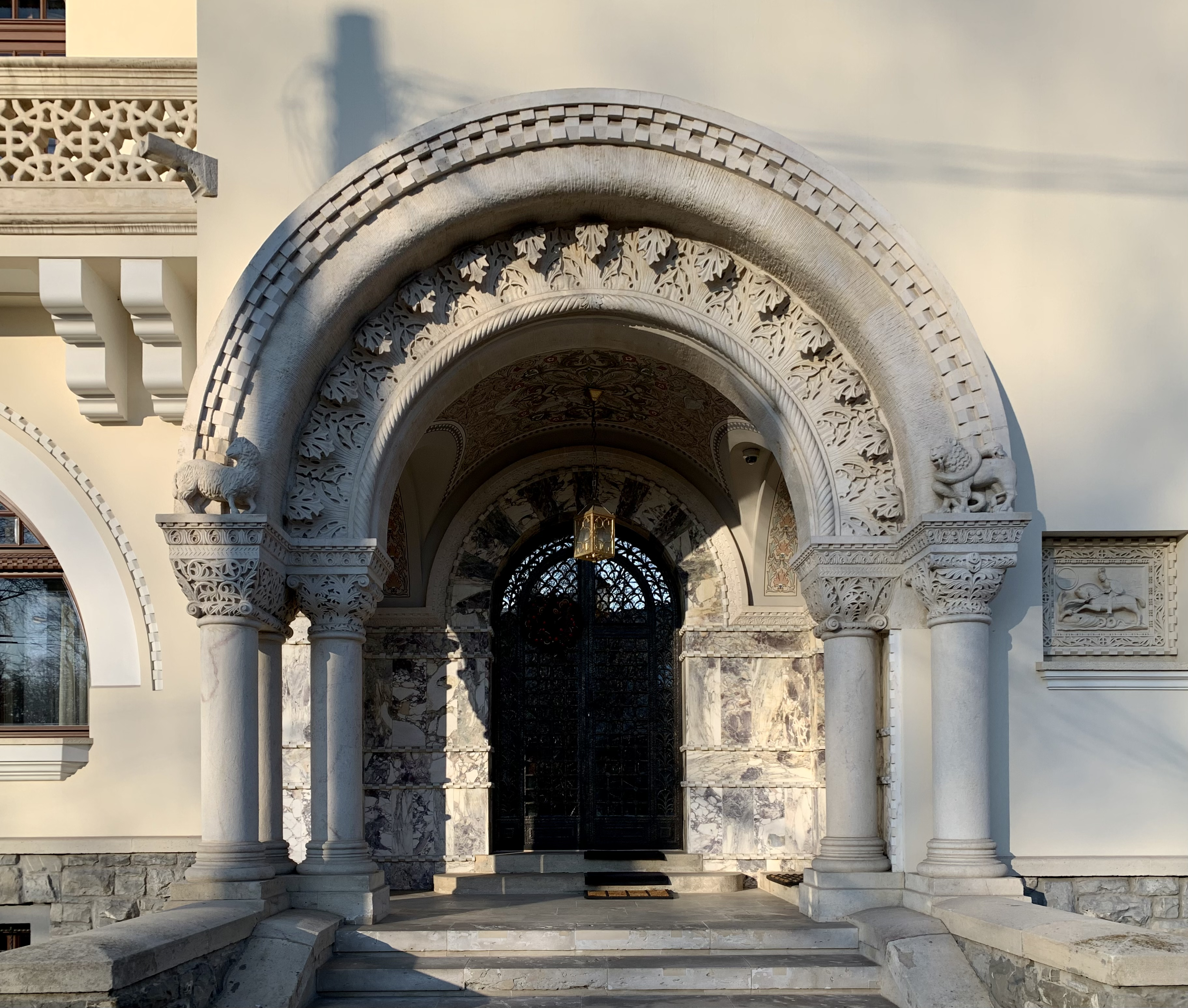
Door of the Laurențiu and Louise Steinebach House, Bucharest, by Alfred Popper, 1915-1916

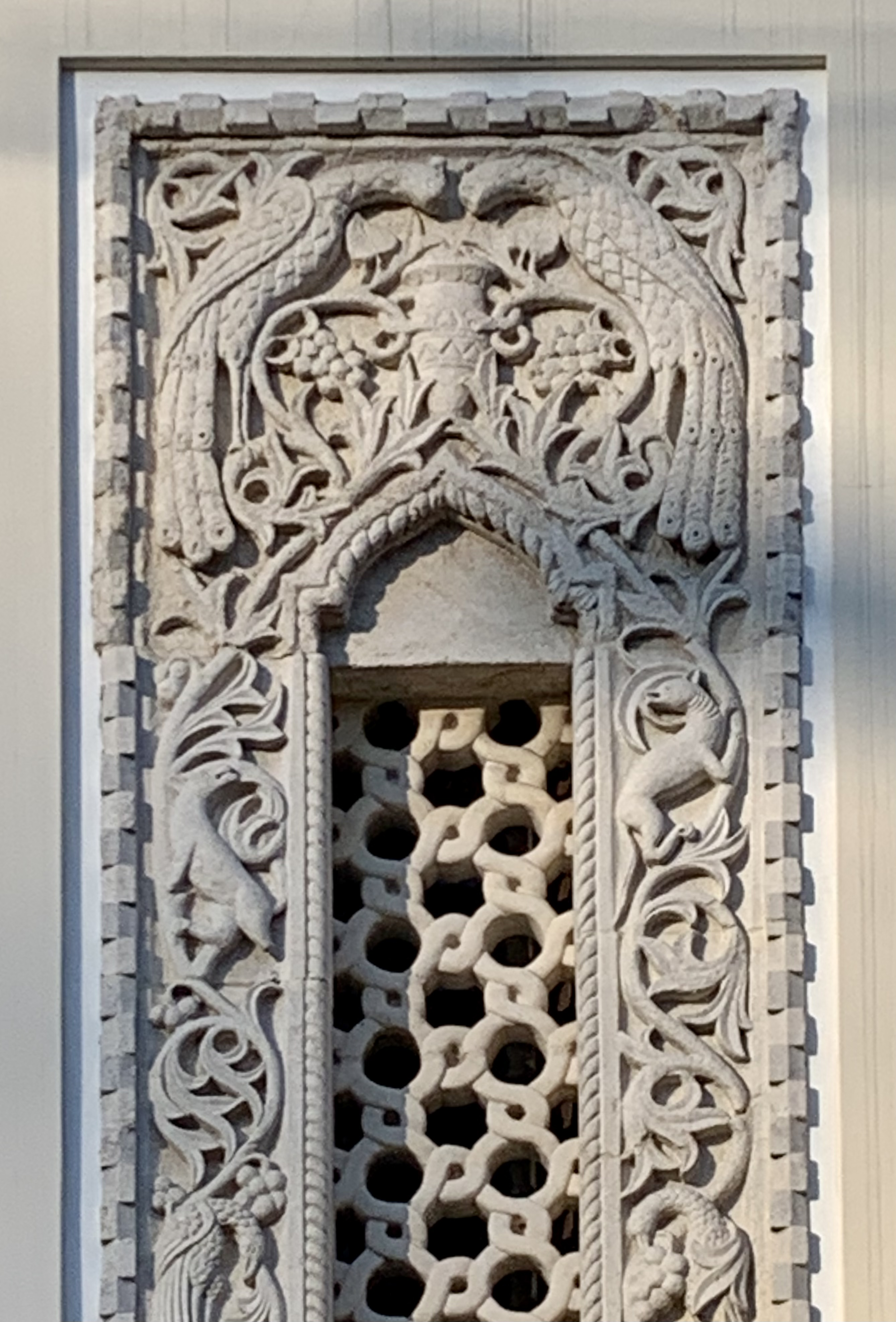
Byzantine Revival window detail of the Laurențiu and Louise Steinebach House with peacocks drinking from a cup, by Alfred Popper, 1915-1916

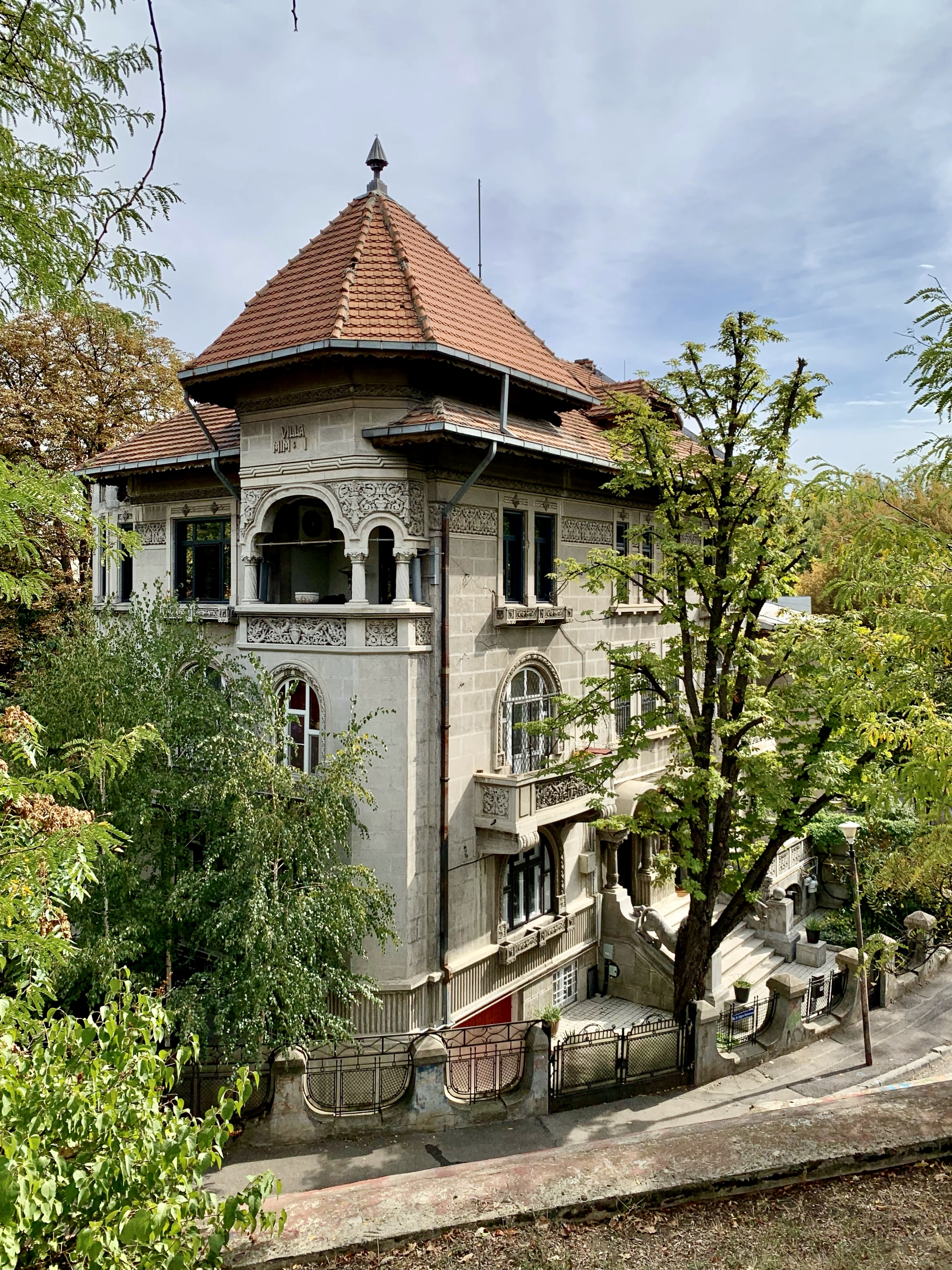
Strada Grigore Romniceanu no. 54, Bucharest, unknown architect, c.1920

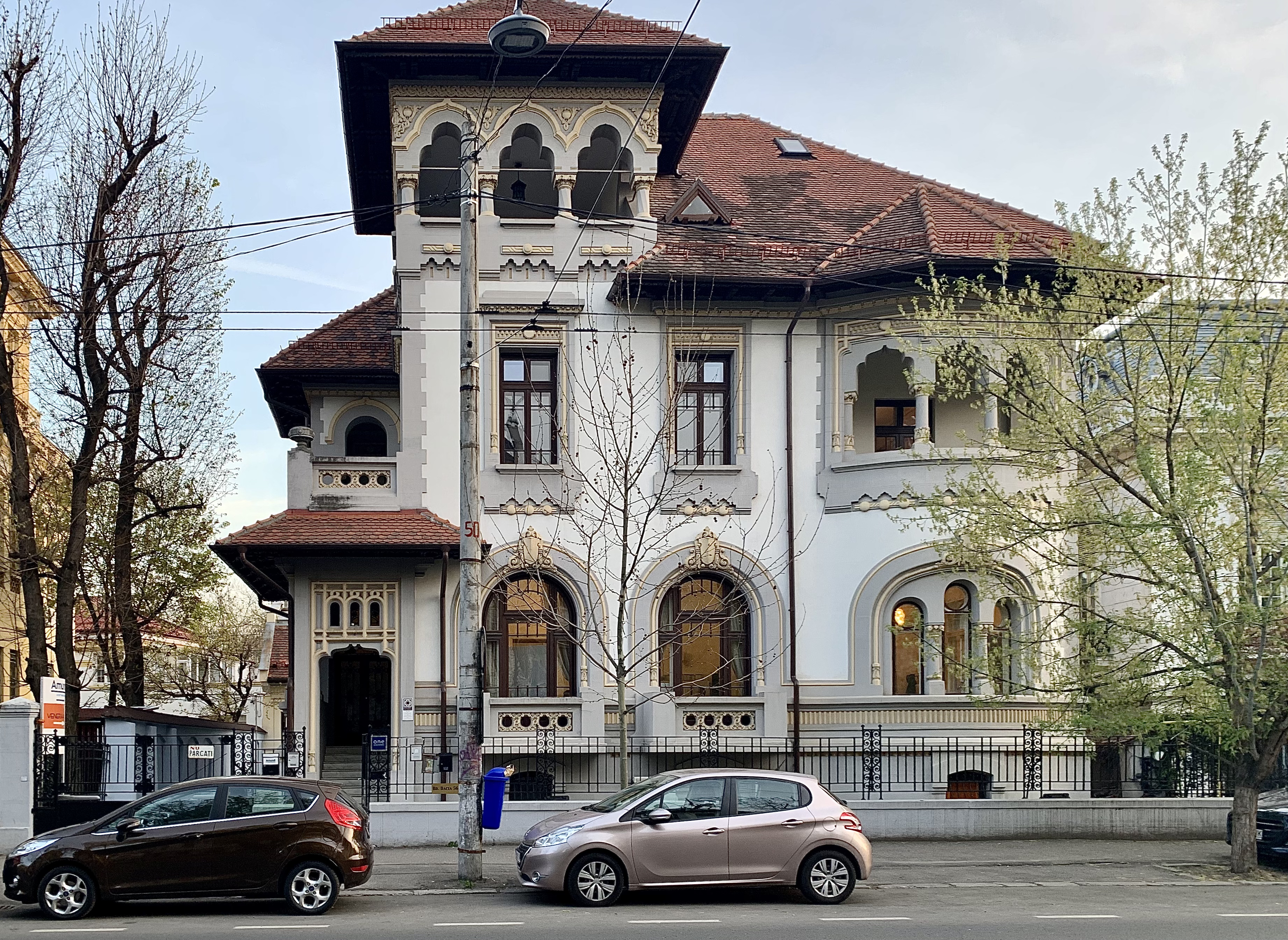
C.N. Câmpeanu/Alfred E. Gheorghiu House, Bucharest, by Constantin Nănescu, c.1923

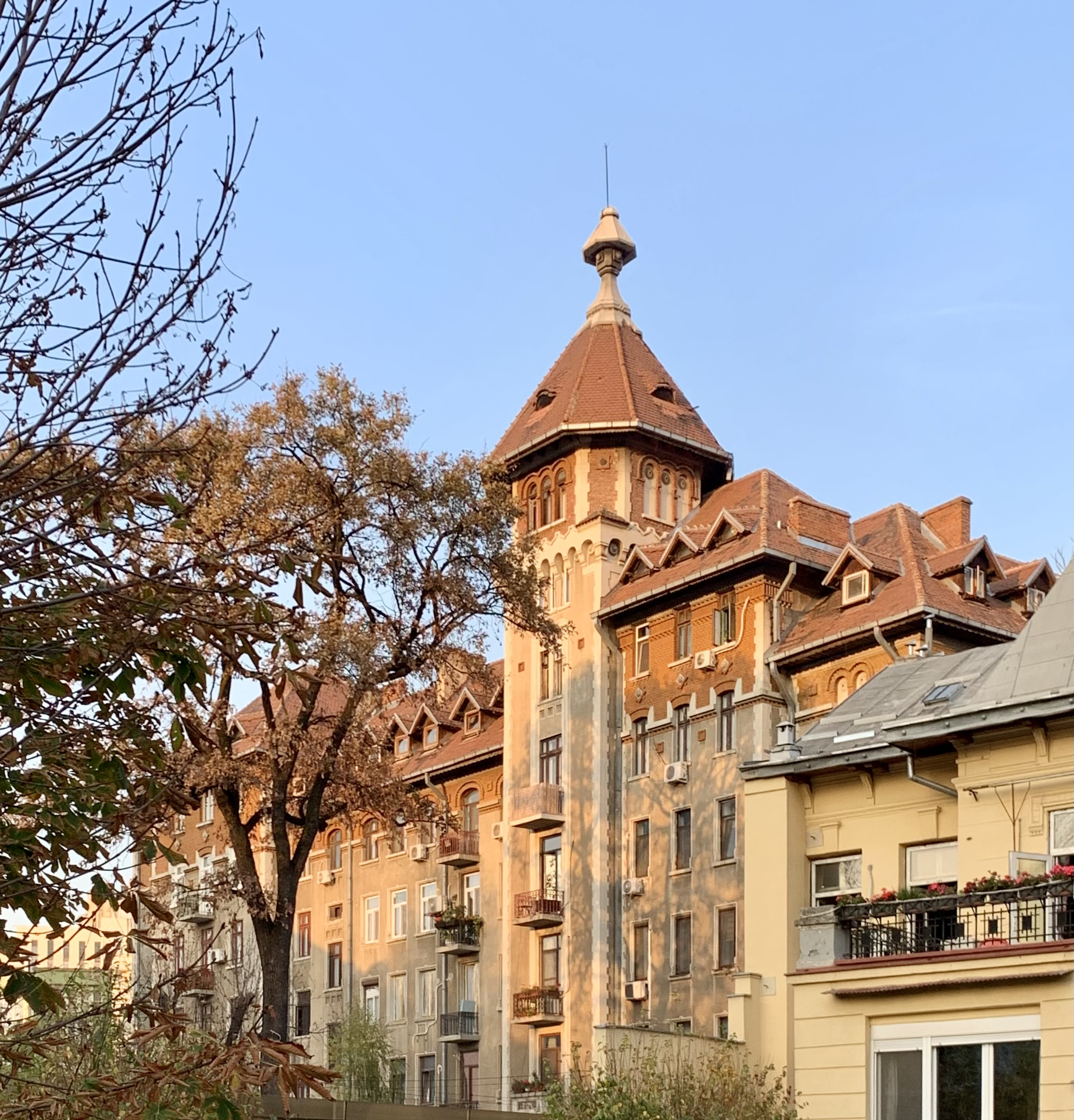
Apartment building built by the Communal Society for Affordable Housing for the State Monopoly Company in the Lahovary Square, Bucharest, by Lucian Teodosiu, 1926-1929

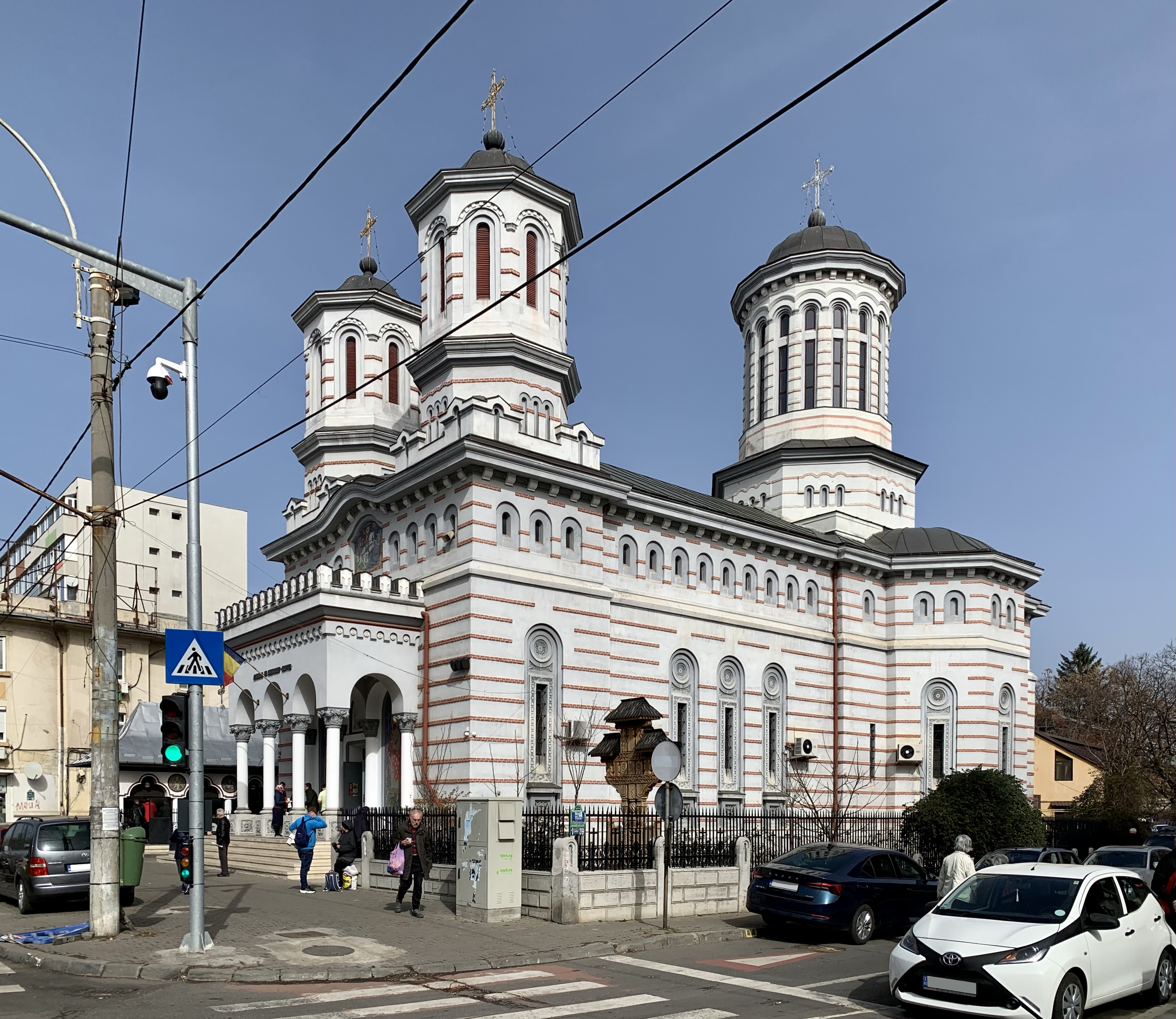
Saint George Grivița Church (Calea Griviței no. 218), Bucharest, by Constantin Pomponiu, 1926-1931

Communal Society for Affordable Housing Building in the C.A. Rosetti Square, Bucharest, by Virginia Andreescu Haret, 1927

Cezar Golici House, Bucharest, by Virginia Andreescu Haret, 1928

To celebrate the 25th anniversary of the coronation of king Carol I of Romania, 40 years of his reign, 25 years since proclamation of the Kingdom of Romania, and 1800 years since the Romans came in the Dacian province, the General Romanian Exhibition took place in the Carol Park (Park of Freedom) of Bucharest in 1906. Most of the pavilions of the fair were temporary structures, the only ones that survived being the Silver Knife Church, the Roman Arenas, the Filaret Electricity Station, small pavilions, the Mining Ministry fountain, and the water tower, designer to look like a medieval relic from the time of Vlad the Impaler. The 1906 General Romanian Exhibition is important because this when the style started to be fully developed.

Buildings from this phase have a consistent look. The 1920s was the peak of popularity, multiple schools, houses and institutions built after WW1 being Romanian Revival. Sometimes it was mixed with Art Deco, a style equally popular in the 1920s.

=== Late (late 1930s and 1940s) ===
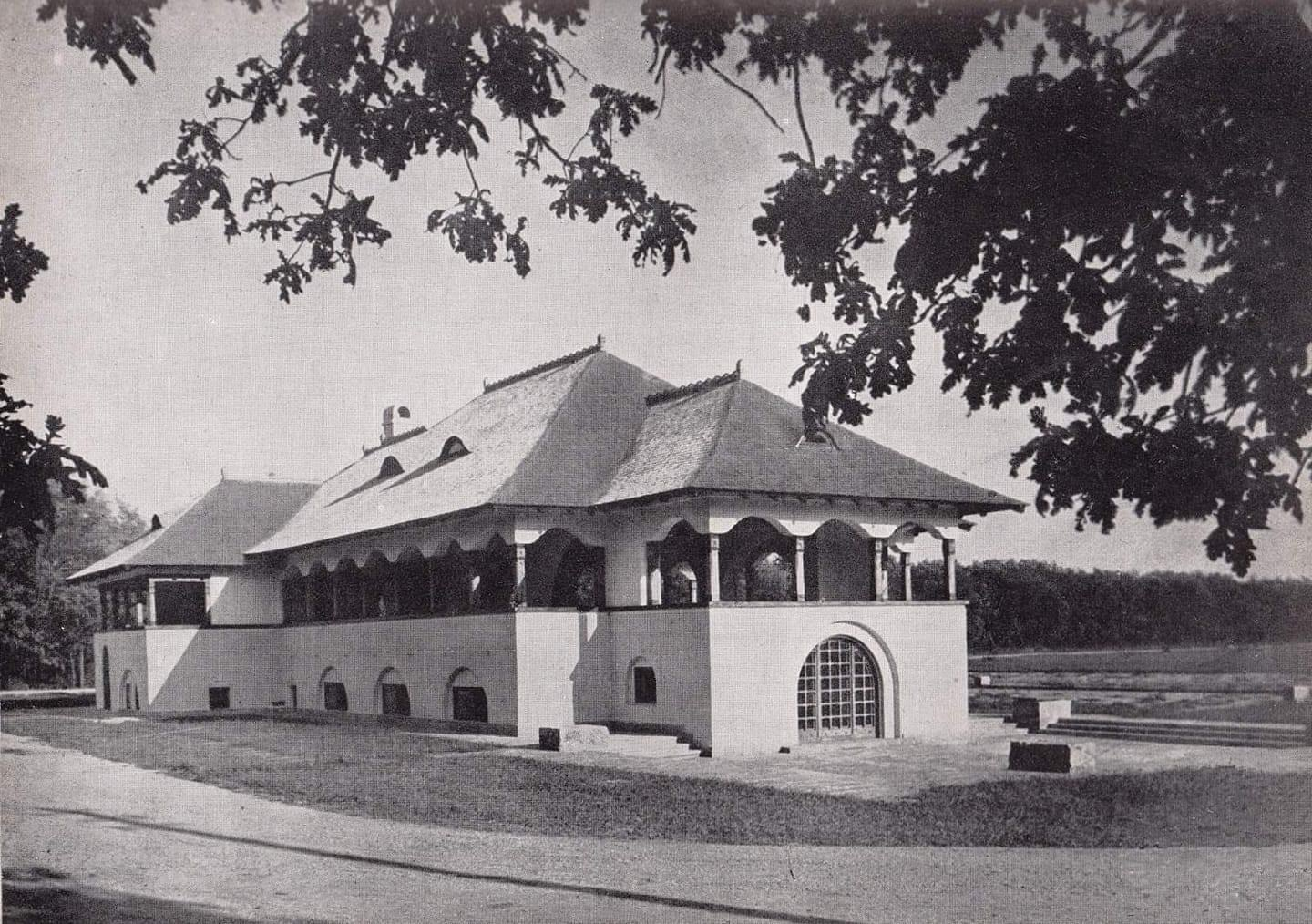
White House Restaurant (Aleea Privighetorilor no. 31-35), Bucharest, by Octav Doicescu, 1930

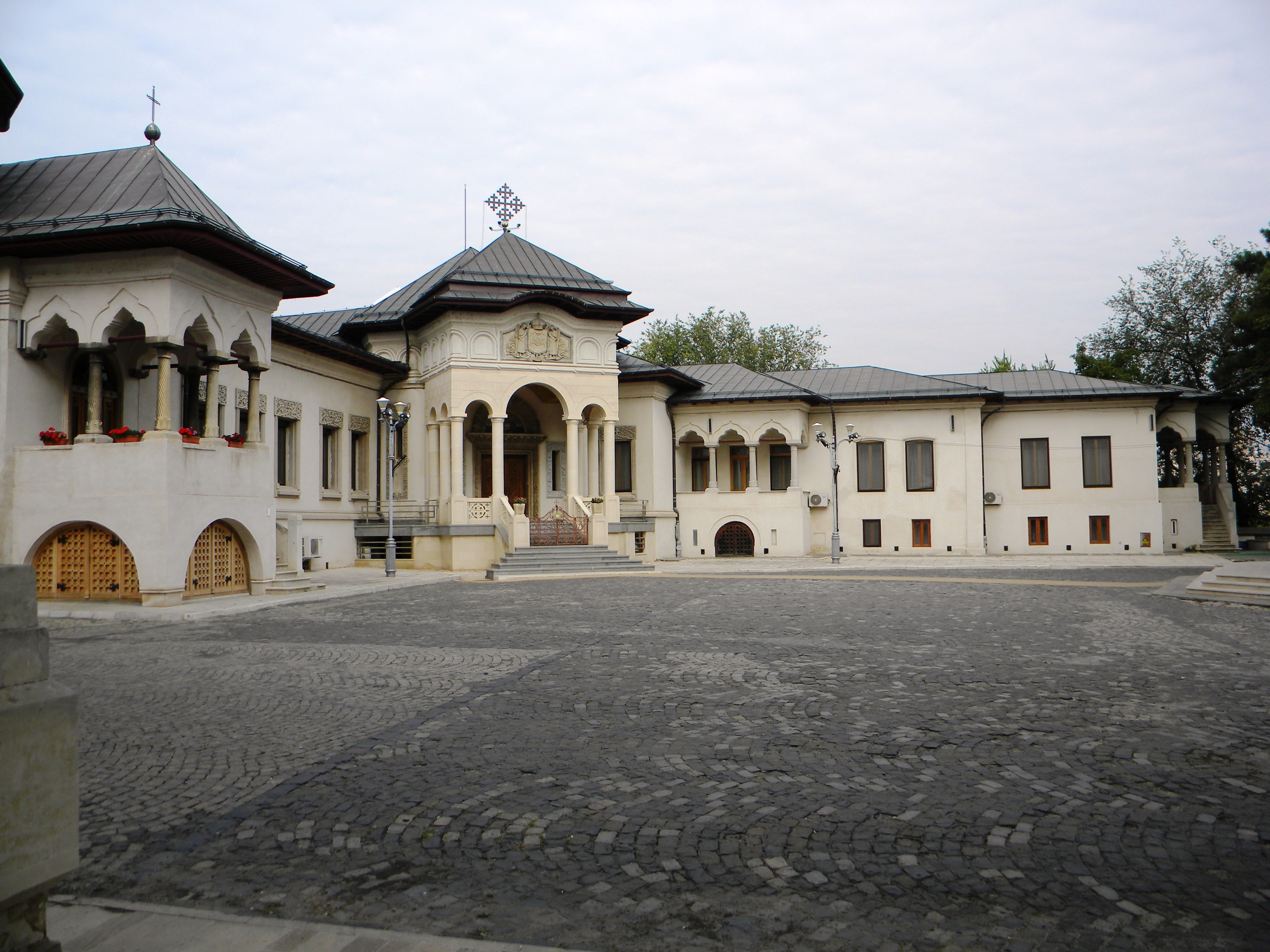
Palace of the Patriarchate, Bucharest, by George Simota, 1932-1936

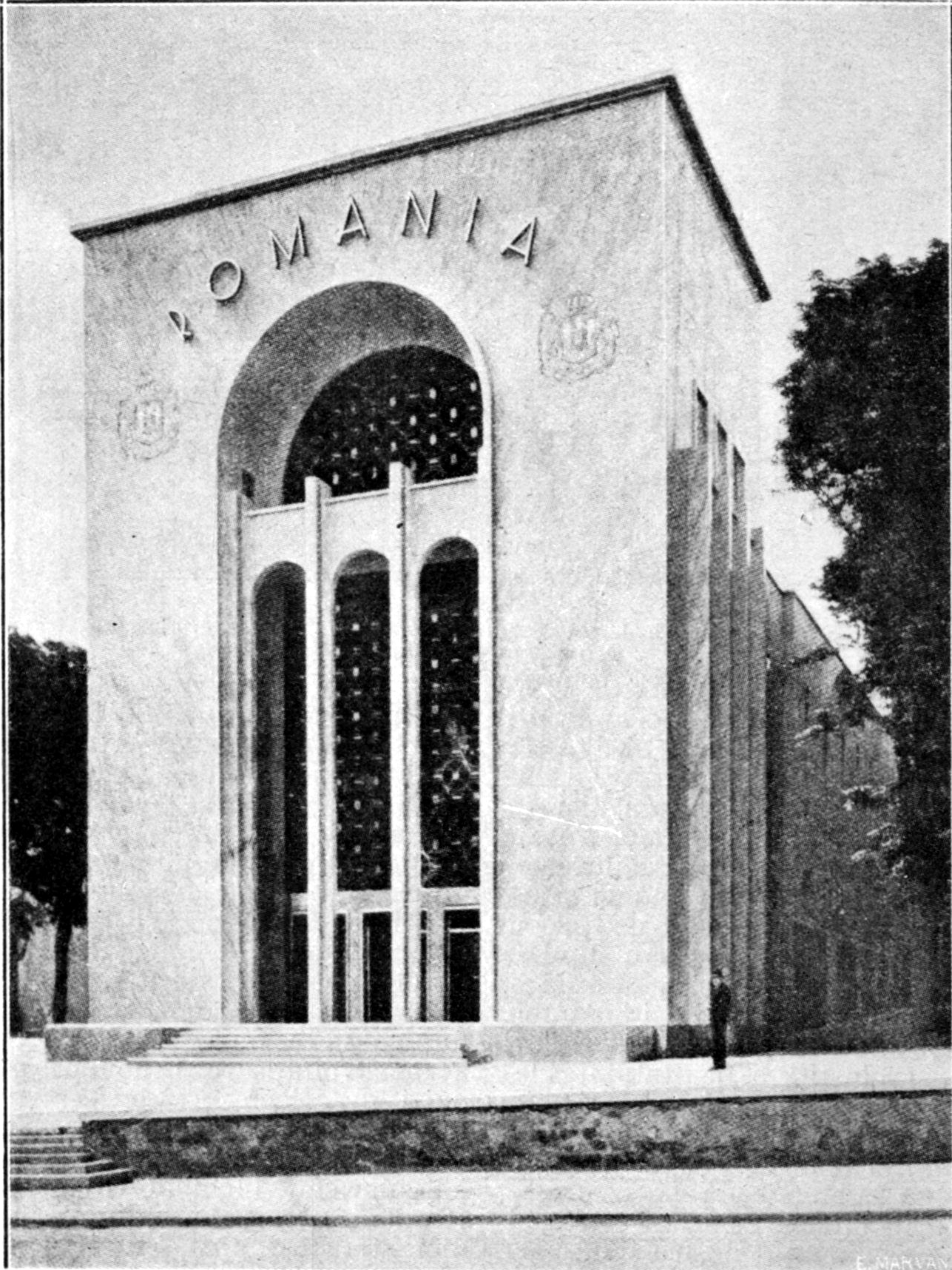
Pavilion of Romania at the 1937 World Exhibition, Paris, by Duiliu Marcu, 1937

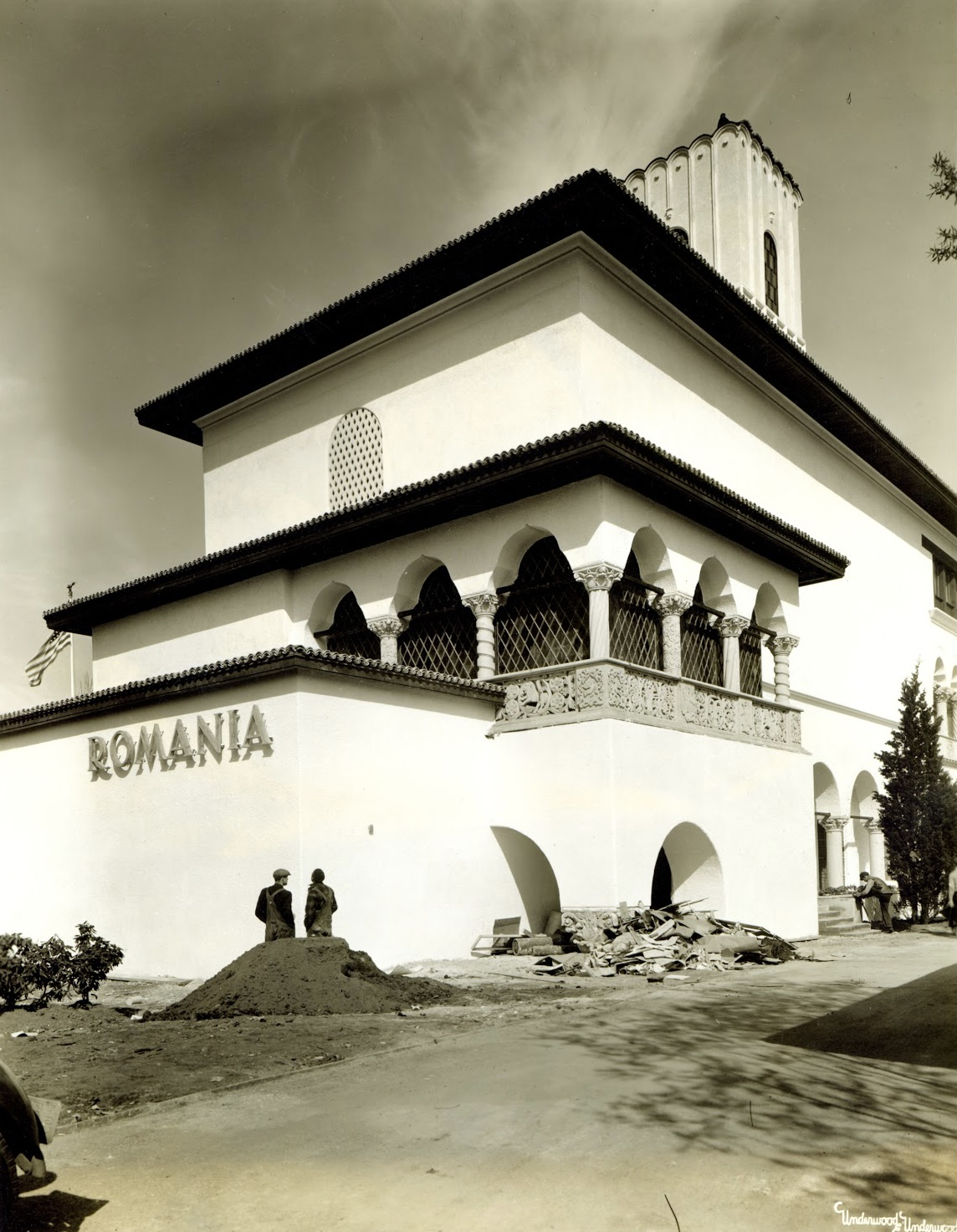
Romanian restaurant at the 1939 World's Fair, New York, by Octav Doicescu, 1939

Under the pressures of Modernism, the style became more and more simplified. Initially, the supporters of the Romanian Revival style rejected Modern architecture. They saw Modern buildings as creations that lack a local spirit. However, their opposition faded with time, leading to mixes of the two movements. Multiple architects, without dropping elements inspired by local tradition, will adopt new materials and techniques. Romanian Revival proportions and volumes were kept, but ornaments were highly simplified or sometimes were just nonexistent. Buildings were reduced to essences.

== Notable examples ==
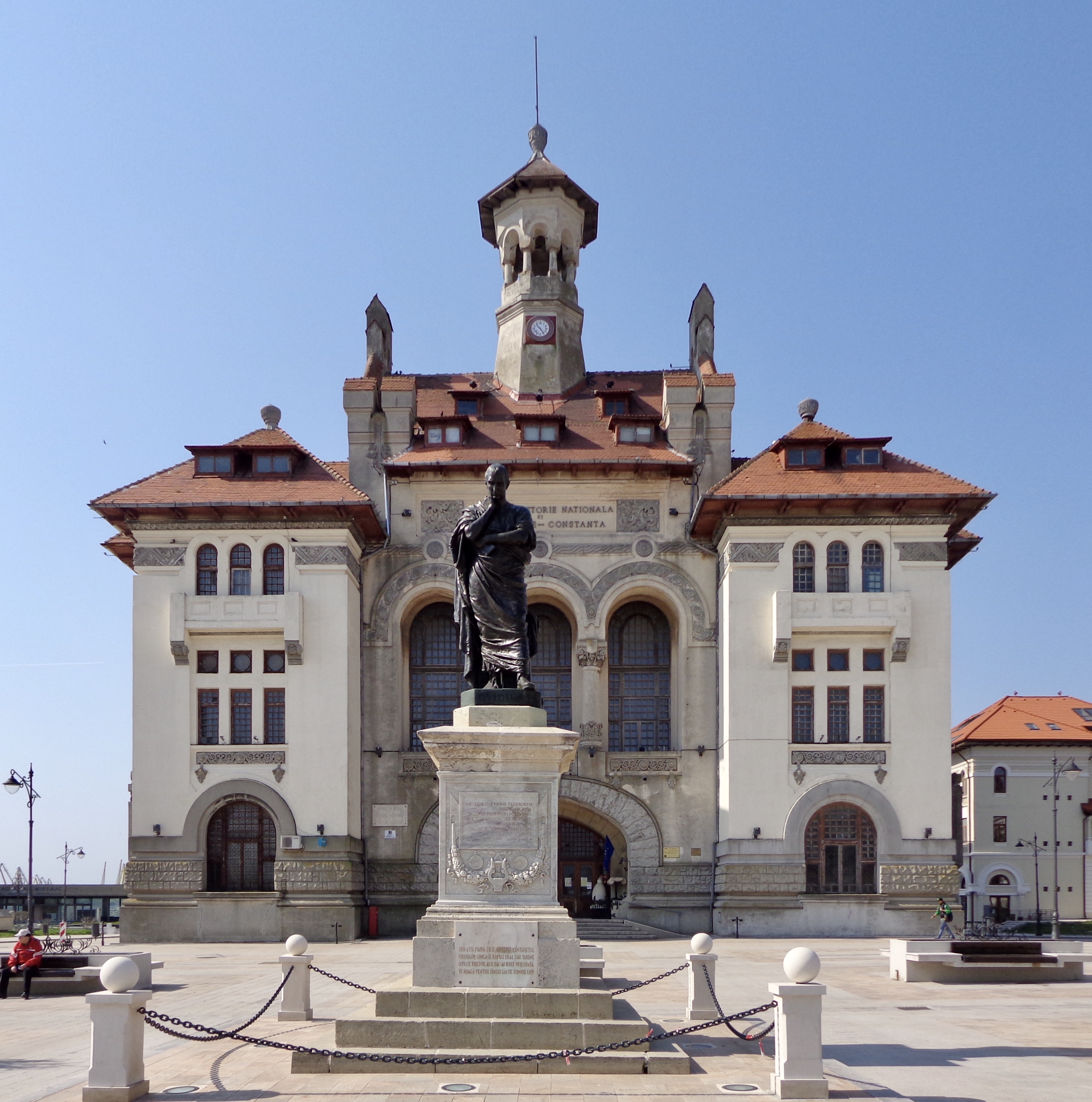
History and Archaeology Museum, Constanța, by Victor Ștefănescu, 1912-1921, with the Statue of Ovid in front of it

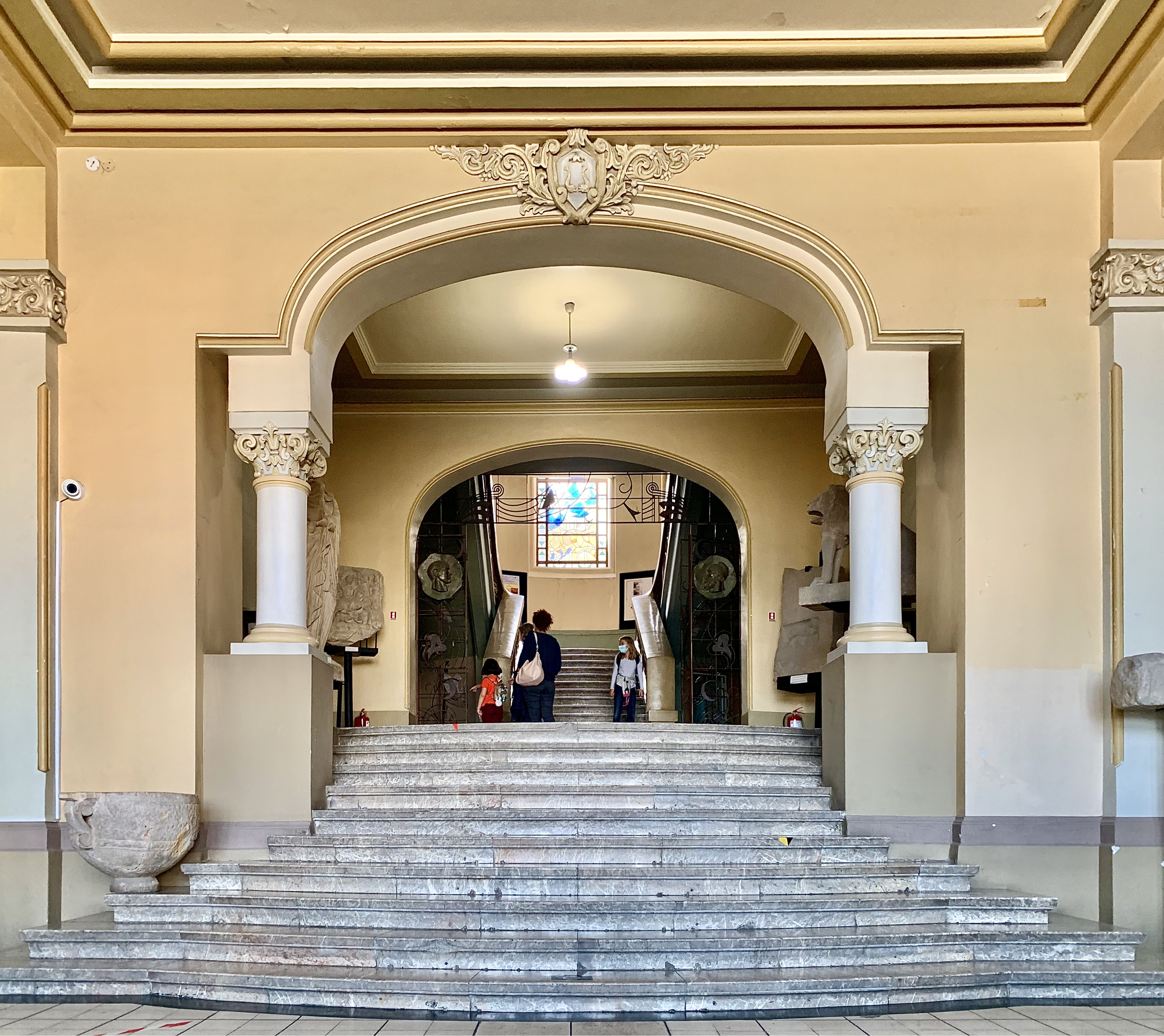
The central stairs of the Constanța History and Archaeology Museum, an example of a Romanian Revival interior

=== Romania ===
- Alexandria
  - Saint Alexander Cathedral (Strada Independenței 7-9)
- Bucharest
  - Nicolae Minovici Villa (Strada Doctor Minovici Nicolae 1)
  - Sector 1 Town Hall (Bulevardul Banul Manta 9)
  - Gheorghe Tătărescu House (Strada Polonă 19)
  - Hagi-Theodoraky House (Șoseaua Kiseleff 57)
  - Romanian Peasant Museum (Șoseaua Kisseleff 3)
  - Dissescu House (Calea Victoriei 196)
  - Amza's Church (Strada Biserica Amzei 12)
  - Lahovari House (Strada Ion Movilă 5)
  - Oprea Soare House (Strada Poenaru Bordea 2)
  - Kiseleff Palace (Strada Barbu Ștefănescu Delavrancea 6A)
  - Gheorghe Petrașcu House (Piața Romană 5)
  - Interior of the Ion Mincu House, its exterior being just Eclectic (Strada Arthur Verona 19)
  - Central School (Strada Icoanei 3-5)
  - Elie Radu House (Strada Alexandru Donici 40)
  - Bucharest City Hall (Bulevardul Regina Elisabeta 47)

In addition, there are areas in Bucharest where most houses are Romanian Revival, such as Cotroceni and Dorobanți.

- Brașov
  - Brașov Opera (Strada Bisericii Române 51)
- Brăila
  - Palace of Agriculture (Calea Călărașilor 52)
- Bușteni
  - Cantacuzino Castle (Strada Zamora 1)
- Buzău
  - City hall (Piața Daciei 1)
- Constanța
  - Constanța History and Archaeology Museum (Piața Ovidiu 12)
  - Constanța Museum of Popular Art (Bulevardul Tomis 32)
- Craiova
  - Former Pallace Hotel (Strada Cuza Alexandru Ioan 1)
  - Museum of Oltenia (Strada Popa Șapcă 8 - Sciences of Nature, Strada Madona Dudu 14 - Archaeology, Strada Matei Basarab 16 - Ethnography)
- Galați
  - Palace of Navigation (Strada Portului 34)
- Iași
  - Sonet Villa (Strada Rece 5)
- Oradea
  - Iuliu Maniu Greek Catholic College (Strada Iuliu Maniu 5)
- Ploiești
  - Ion Luca Caragiale National College (Strada Gheorghe Doja 98)
  - National Bank (Strada Tache Ionescu 1)
- Sibiu
  - Oașia Building (Strada Turnului 23)
  - Faculty of Orthodox Theology (Strada Mitrolopiei 20)
  - Gheorghe Lazăr Boarding School building (Strada Turismului 15)
- Târgu Jiu
  - Tudor Vladimirescu National College (Strada Unirii 13)
- Timișoara
  - Romanian National Opera arcades (Strada Mărășești 2)

=== Moldova ===
- Bălți
  - Saint Constantine and Elena Cathedral
  - Residence of the Bishop of Hotin (Strada Visarion Puiu 7)
- Tighina
  - Mulmana Hospital

=== Albania ===
- Sarandë
  - Nicolae Iorga House (Rruga Mitat Hoxha), headquarters of the former Romanian Institute in Albania

=== Bulgaria ===
- Dulovo
  - St. George Church
- Silistra
  - Regional History Museum

=== Ukraine ===
- Khotyn
  - House of Culture (Vulytsya Nezalezhnosti, 19-17)
- Chernivtsi
  - St. Nikolai Church
  - Holy Apostles Peter and Paul Church
  - Palace of the border guards
  - Priests' dormitory building

== See also ==
- Architecture of Romania
- Byzantine Revival architecture
