= Alexandru Tzigara-Samurcaș =

Romanian academic (1872–1952)

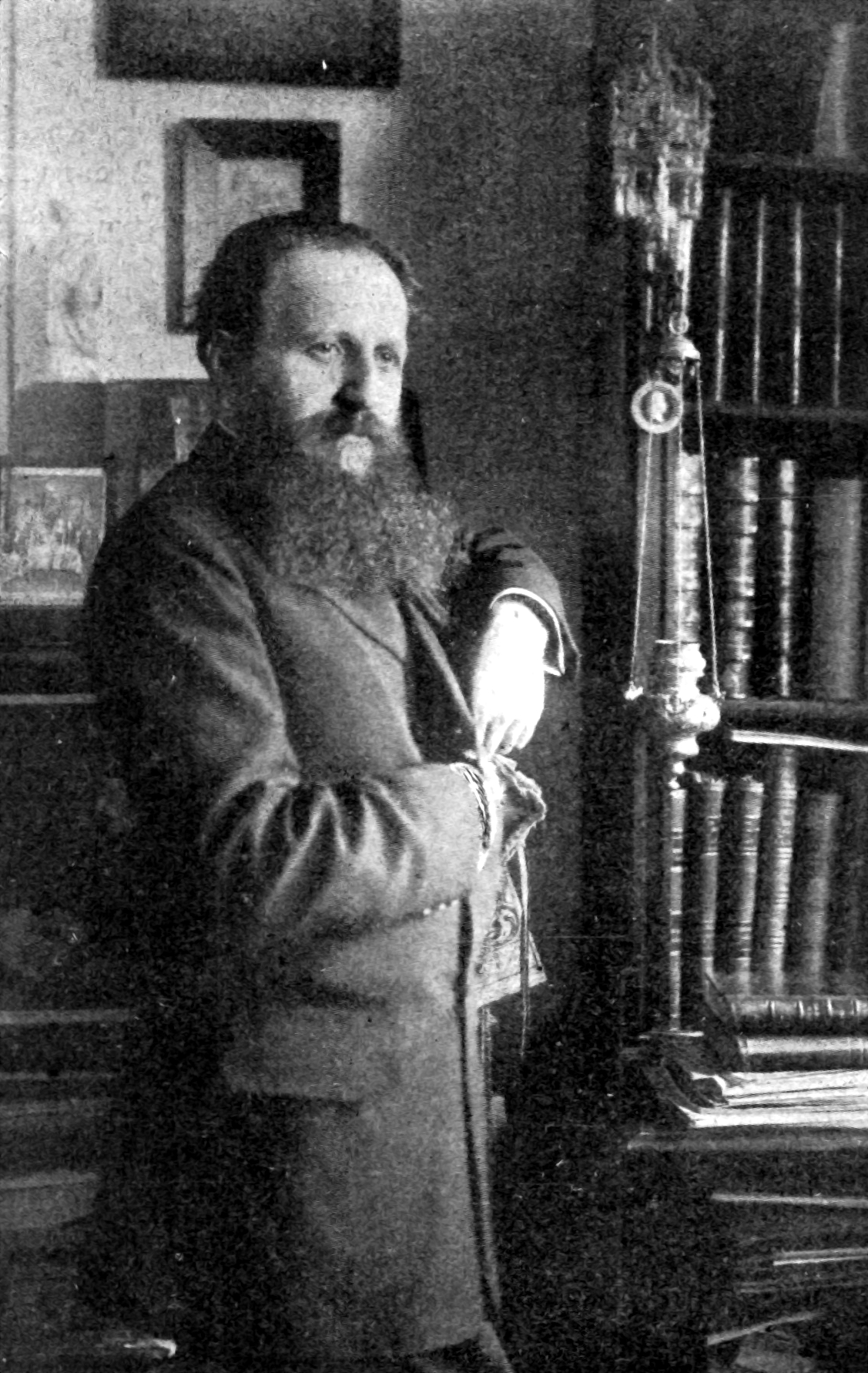
- Tzigara, photographed c. 1914
- Born: April 4, 1872; Bucharest, Principality of Romania
- Died: April 30, 1952 (aged 80); Filantropia Hospital, Bucharest, Romanian People's Republic
- Resting place: Bellu Cemetery, Bucharest
- Other names: Al. Tzigara, Tzigara-Sumurcaș, Tzigara-Samurcash, Tzigara-Samurkasch, Țigara-Samurcaș
- Awards: Order of the Star of Romania, Grand Officer class Order of St. Sava

Academic background
- Education: University of Bucharest; LMU Munich
- Influences: Wilhelm von Bode, Eugène Grasset, Horace Lecoq de Boisbaudran, Titu Maiorescu, Alexandru Odobescu, Grigore Tocilescu

Academic work
- Era: 19th and 20th centuries
- School or tradition: Junimea
- Main interests: ethography, museology, art conservation, art of Romania, eugenics

Alexandru Tzigara-Samurcaș (Romanian pronunciation: [alekˈsandru t͡siˈɡara samurˈkaʃ]; also known as Al. Tzigara, Tzigara-Sumurcaș, Tzigara-Samurcash, Tzigara-Samurkasch or Țigara-Samurcaș; April 4, 1872 – April 30, 1952) was a Romanian art historian, ethnographer, museologist and cultural journalist, also known as local champion of art conservation, Romanian Police leader and pioneer radio broadcaster. Tzigara was a member of the Junimea literary society, holding positions at the National School of Fine Arts, the University of Bucharest and lastly the University of Cernăuți. During his youth, he was secretary to Carol I, the King of Romania. Close to the royal family, he also served as head of the Carol I Academic Foundation, where he set up a large collection of photographic plates. Tzigara achieved fame in 1906 as founder of the "National Museum", nucleus of the present-day Museum of the Romanian Peasant, but was also involved in arranging and preserving the Theodor Aman art fund.

During World War I, Tzigara-Samurcaș irritated Romanian public opinion by accepting to serve in a puppet administration set up by the Central Powers. Although his conduct was considered benign by the legitimate government, it drew him accusations of collaborationism from within academia, and aggravated his long-standing conflict with historian Nicolae Iorga. Tzigara was prevented from advancing in his university career over the interwar period, but compensated for this mishap with other achievements: he was a delegate to several world fairs, the first-ever lecturer on Radio Romania's staff, the editor in chief of Convorbiri Literare magazine, and, shortly before retirement, a corresponding member of the Academy. His post-World War II years were spent in obscurity, owing to his ideological incompatibility with the Romanian communist regime.

Alexandru Tzigara-Samurcaș was alleged to be Carol I's illegitimate son, a rumor fueled by his closeness to court. He was himself the father of artist Ana Tzigara-Berza, and father in law of folklorist Marcu Berza.

== Biography ==
=== Origins and early life ===
Tzigara-Samurcaș was born on April 4 [O.S. March 23] 1872, though some records have "March 1". His exact place of birth was a since-demolished house on Scaune Street, downtown Bucharest. This was to be his childhood home, making him neighbors with physician Wilhelm Kremnitz and his wife, the poet Mite Kremnitz. A popular rumor has Alexandru as the illegitimate son of Domnitor Carol I, the future King of Romania, to whom he was especially close in later years. Historian Lucian Boia gives some credit to this piece of oral history, and notes that Tzigara, like the Kremnitzes, had "an unusually tight relationship" with the royal family. According to literary historian Șerban Cioculescu, Tzigara's royal descent was "Pulcinella's secret"; museologist Hunor Boér also calls Tzigara "an illegitimate member of the House of Hohenzollern".

Reporter Ioan Massoff confessed that he once asked Tzigara about this rumor, but that this was regarded as a "faux-pas". Researcher Zigu Ornea contrarily notes that Tzigara may have been spreading the story around, and concludes: "This legend is naturally hard to verify but, in any case, it is a possible one, since Tzigara-Samurcaș was born in 1872 and Carol I was present on our throne, as Domnitor, from 1866." Like Boia, Ornea notes that Tzigara's close relationship with the king, the king's repeated interventions on his behalf "every time [Tzigara's career] got stuck", and his contacts with the Kremnitzes (including Mite, Carol's alleged mistress) were some additional clues to a royal bloodline. Historian Vasile Docea criticizes Ornea's verdict, noting that it relies on questionable sources, and argues that, far from embracing this legend, Tzigara spoke "with evident pride" about his Tzigara roots. According to historian Lucian Nastasă, Docea effectively "disproved" the rumor of Alexandru Tzigara-Samurcaș's royal descent.

Combined arms of the Tzigara and Samurcaș families

Alexandru's mother and Carol's alleged mistress was Elena Samurcaș, married to Toma Tzigara. Research into his maternal genealogy led the art historian to conclude that he was of noble Greek and Italo-Greek descent: his supposed ancestor was Spatharios Zotos Tzigaras, buried in Venice at San Giorgio dei Greci (1599). The Samurcaș family had aristocratic blood, being related to the boyar nobility of Wallachia: the art historian's paternal line made him a relative of the Kretzulescu, Rallet, Bengescu and Crețeanu boyar families. His maternal great-grandfather was Grigore Bengescu, a government minister of the United Principalities. Also of boyar rank, Alexandru's Samurcaș ancestors had a history on both sides of the Southern Carpathians, in Wallachia and in then-Austrian-ruled Transylvania. Active during the Age of Revolution, Wallachian Vornic Constantin Samurcaș took part in Eterist agitation, but later, fleeing the 1821 rural uprising, settled in Kronstadt (Brașov) to spy for the Austrians. Another ancestor, Postelnic Alecu Samurcaș, was a linguist, known for his work in the Greek language. The meeting of two branches was recorded in the coat of arms that Tzigara-Samurcaș fashioned for himself, showing the spatha of Zotos Tzigaras, alongside a sable (Romanian: samur) and a stylized eyebrow.

Alexandru was baptized into the Romanian Orthodox Church. A while after Toma Tzigara's death, he was adopted by his childless uncle Ioan Alecu Samurcaș (he officially took the name Tzigara-Samurcaș years later, in 1899); he was also helped with his education by the Kremnitzes, who taught him German, introduced him to high society circles, and regarded him as a son. Ioan, a career diplomat and personal friend of the poet Mihai Eminescu, took Alexandru and his three sisters into his home at Icoanei Street 174. He later bequeathed Alexandru his letters to and from Eminescu, which archivists see as having great documentary value.

The young man's first contacts with history and folk art came by means of his extended family, which collected and preserved documents and art objects. After graduating from the Matei Basarab High School and taking his Baccalaureate, he enlisted at the University of Bucharest Faculty of Letters, Historical Section. It was here that the young man was acquainted with his first mentors: writer-collector Alexandru Odobescu and archeologist Grigore Tocilescu, the latter of whom ensured Tzigara's employment as custodian for the National Museum of Antiquities. He was a critic of the museum's underdevelopment under Tocilescu's management, and wrote that the disorganized collection comprised an Egyptian mummy, copies of frescoes from the Cathedral Church in Curtea de Argeș, items from the Pietroasele Treasure, and works of Precolumbian art, alongside a scale model of the Eiffel Tower.

=== Early academic career ===
From 1893, the young graduate was in the German Empire, where he studied at the University of Berlin and LMU Munich, taking his Ph.D. in Munich with a dissertation on the Baroque painter Simon Vouet. He received his diploma, magna cum laude. Tzigara-Samurcaș returned to his home country and, following a dispute with Tocilescu, gave up his position at the Antiquities Museum. He later specialized in museology in Paris, hearing lectures at the École des Beaux-Arts and working for city museums, before returning to Germany, where he studied with the preeminent Brunswickian curator Wilhelm von Bode.

Back in Romania, Tzigara unsuccessfully applied for the Archeology Chair created at the University of Iași, but lost; according to scholar and diarist Teohari Antonescu, who emerged as the victor, the competition was rigged in his own favor, even though Tzigara "had the good sense to come prepared." From 1899, he was librarian of the Carol I Academic Foundation and Professor of Aesthetics and Art History at the National School of Fine Arts. As Tzigara later acknowledged, his introduction to royalty came through a relationship with the Kremnitzes. This period saw the start of Tzigara's close relationship with Carol, whom the art historian later called "my most generous protector" and "the sovereign par excellence". Received into royal circles, he was a confidant of the Queen Consort and cultural patron, Elisabeth of Wied, whom he called "the animator of Romanian art". For a while, he was her private secretary, helping her fulfill her literary ambitions under the Carmen Sylva signature. Tzigara's recollections speak with enthusiasm about Elisabeth's works, as well as about the king's dislike for her interests in spiritism or philosophy, and discuss Carol's enduring affection for Mite Kremnitz.

In order to support his lectures at the Fine Arts School, Tzigara began gathering photographic plates, a collection which grew in size over the following decades. It includes images of European monuments and works of art, as well as samples of Romanian architecture (in some cases, the only surviving images of since-demolished buildings) and copies of maps. The images of local life are considered of particular importance, since they document the Westernization and modernization of Romania's landscape. Mostly anonymous works, they most likely include some of Tzigara's own photographs. A few of them were inventoried by Editura Casa Școalelor, and some were published, in Tzigara's lifetime, by Buletinul Comisiunii Monumentelor Istorice or other Romanian scientific magazines. His image projections at the Carol I Foundation, supporting a students' elective course on sculpture and painting, became one of the better-known student summer activities.

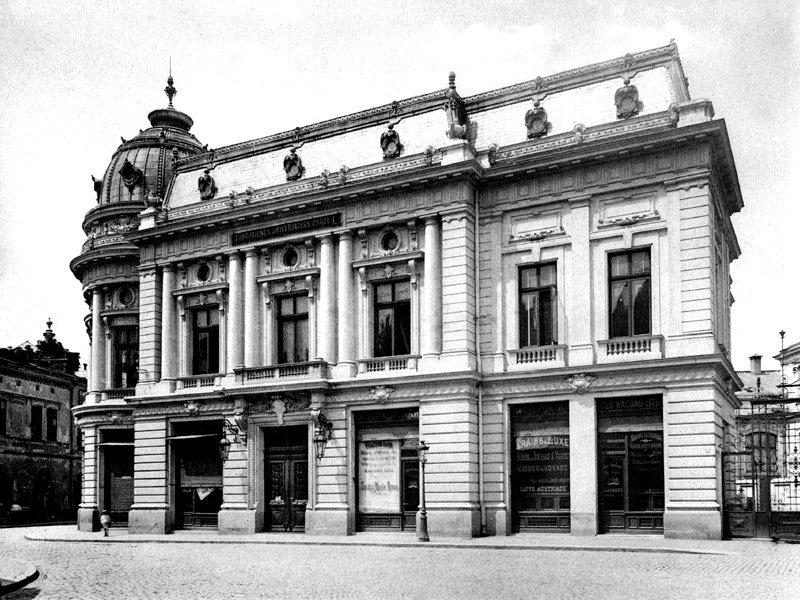
Palace of the Carol I Academic Foundation, c. 1904 (photograph by Alexandru Antoniu)

The young scholar was at the time also interested in the development of decorative arts, which he wanted to reflect the local tradition of handicrafts and notions of national specificity. According to art historian Ioana Vlasiu, Tzigara and painter-researcher Abgar Baltazar were in part responsible for fusing local folk art and international primitivism with Art Nouveau, thus paving the way for the Neo-Brâncovenesc school of decorators and architects. The interest in decorative works was a special focus of his visits to England and France—the South Kensington Museum impressed him greatly, as did the workshops of Eugène Grasset and Horace Lecoq de Boisbaudran.

=== Junimea debut ===
Described by Lucian Nastasă as a case of social climbing, Tzigara's marriage to Maria (1900) brought him into the high circles of aristocracy: Maria, born into the Cantacuzino family (daughter of Alexandru Cantacuzino, former Foreign Affairs Minister), was also the widow of Grigore G. Sturdza (son of the more famous Beizadea Grigore), and as such inherited part of the Sturdza family fortune. Through her mother Coralia, Maria Tzigara-Cantacuzino was additionally related to boyar lines of Moldavia, the Boldurs and the Costakis, as well as to Zulnia, mother of historian Nicolae Iorga. This marriage was reportedly arranged by the Kremnitzes, the couple having as their best men-godfathers two influential political figures: Lupu C. Kostaki and Constantin C. Arion. Moving out of the Samurcaș home, Alexandru lived with his wife, his mother, and his sisters, first at a house on Știrbei Vodă Street, and, from 1904, at a villa on Intrarea Nordului—outside Cișmigiu Gardens.

During the fin de siècle period, Tzigara-Samurcaș also began a cooperation with Junimea, the literary society representing Romanian traditional conservatism, and sympathized with the Junimist nucleus of the Conservative Party. The art historian was one of the young scholars fascinated with the personality of Titu Maiorescu, the cultural critic and main Junimea leader, and joined a new Junimist critical elite which also comprised Constantin Rădulescu-Motru, Pompiliu Eliade, Mihail Dragomirescu, P. P. Negulescu etc. His work was featured, along with texts by other 50 Junimists, in the Editura Socec volume Lui Titu Maiorescu omagiu, XV februarie MCM ("To Titu Maiorescu as Homage, February 15, 1900"). Maiorescu's diaries display his interest in Tzigara's private life, and claim that the scholar was by then lover of the widowed and much older Mite Kremnitz, with whom Maiorescu himself had had an affair.

Tzigara attended, in 1901, a major event in Junimist society: the wedding between Nicolae Iorga and Ecaterina, daughter of scholar Ioan Bogdan, where Tzigara unofficially represented the royal court. Tzigara was the couple's godfather at an Orthodox marriage service held outside the Kingdom of Romania, in Belgerei (Șcheii Brașovului), Transylvania. For a while, Iorga and Bogdan were both interested in obtaining Tzigara a better employment at the University of Bucharest, but their efforts were made useless by the Junimea adversary in government, the National Liberal Party. Before 1903, Tzigara became a literary and art columnist at Epoca newspaper, headed at the time by Maiorescu; the following year, he and Alceu Urechia were putting out a travel yearbook, Anuarul Turiștilor, with contributions from Ștefan Octavian Iosif and Ludovic Mrazek. Iosif became his employee at the Foundation, but, according to historian Nicolae Rauș, was mistreated by Tzigara, who resented his political engagement with the non-Junimist side of Romanian nationalism. Iosif ultimately resigned in April 1913.

During the period, Junimea popularized its causes through Epoca, rather than through their main venue Convorbiri Literare, and, according to Maiorescu's own pronouncement, Tzigara's work was a main asset. Around 1907, Tzigara's writings were also regularly featured in Convorbiri Literare, now edited by Maiorescu's pupil Simion Mehedinți. At the time, Transylvania's Răvașul journal commented that Tzigara's art chronicle and Aurel Popovici's political column were especially "rich" in information, and mentioned that Tzigara and Teohari Antonescu were debating, through the journal, about the characteristics of fortified houses (cule) from Oltenia region. As literary historian Tudor Vianu notes, Tzigara-Samurcaș and architect Aurel Zagoritz centered their contributions here on the scientific study of Romanian folk art, but their presence nevertheless coincided with Convorbiri Literare's decline in readership. Tzigara also published his articles in Iorga's traditionalist magazine Sămănătorul, where he discussed the art exhibits of the Tinerimea Artistică society.

=== National Museum creation ===
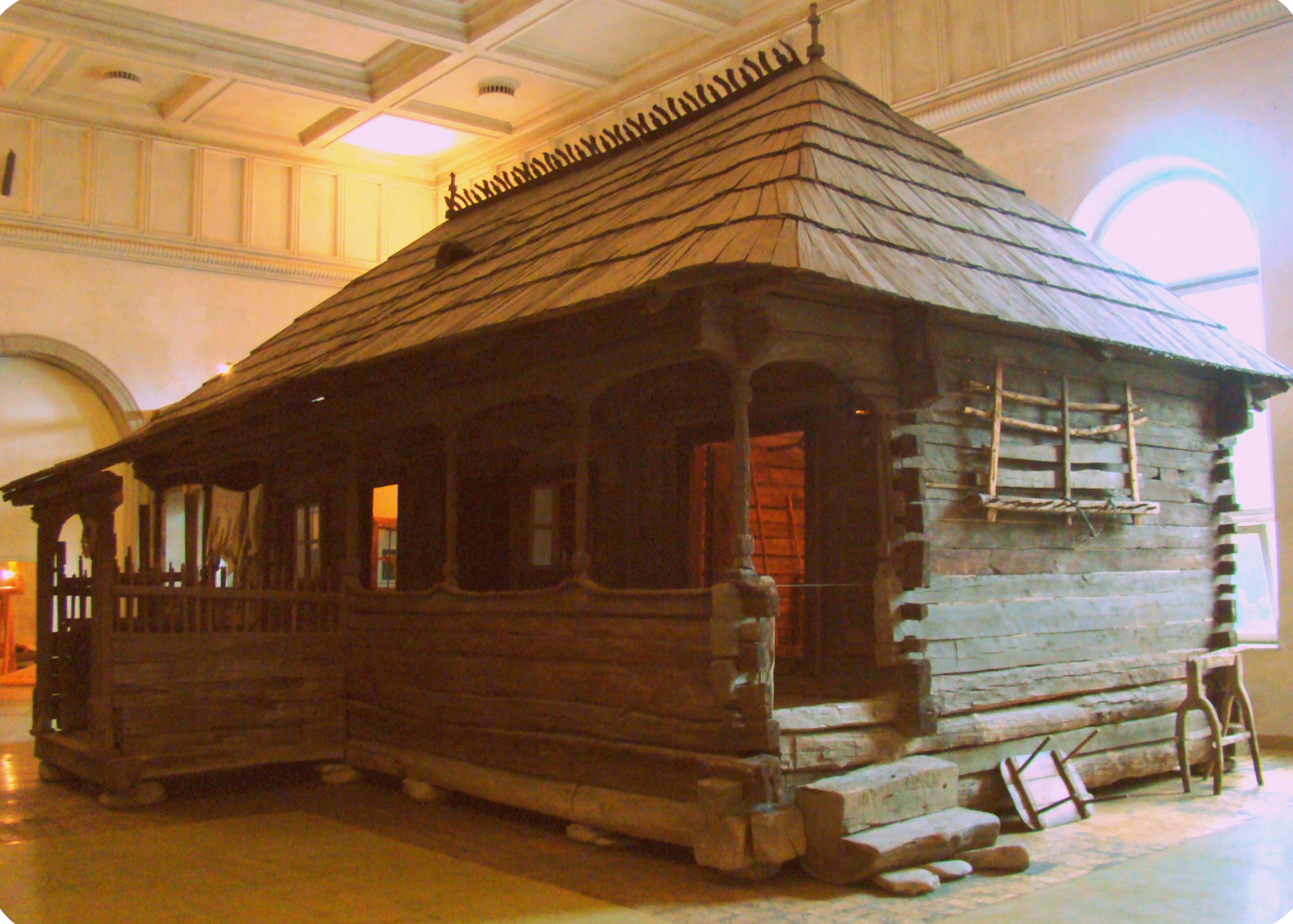
"Antonie Mogoș House", preserved in the Museum of the Romanian Peasant

Around 1901, inspired by the Paris World Fair, Tzigara and other Romanian ethnographers first took into consideration the establishment of a permanent ethnographic collection. Like other Romanian intellectuals, Tzigara preserved his special interest in handicrafts, which, art conservator Isabelle Longuet argues, were "elevated to the status of 'national art' " in the belief that the peasantry represented "an authentic 'Romanianness' ". In similar terms, ethologist Ioana Popescu notes: "[Tzigara's] collections were to become the argument and the source of inspiration for the national ideology and creation." His project came after a similar attempt on the part of art collector Nicolae Minovici, founder of the private folk art museum Casa Minovici, and an even earlier textile art archive, endorsed by Maiorescu (1875).

1906 marked the start of Tzigara's chief work as an ethnographer. That year, he founded the "Museum of Ethnography and National Art", now Museum of the Romanian Peasant (and which he intended to name "Museum of the Romanian People"), serving as its Director for the next forty years. This project received support from Education Minister Haret and, on the other side of politics, from Haret's predecessor Maiorescu. The institution was later known as "Museum of Ethnography and National Art" or "Carol I Museum of Ethnography and National Art". Its original quarters were the abandoned National Mint building on Kiseleff Road (where Tzigara and his family lived between 1906 and 1912), but plans were being made for a new, more adequate museum palace.

As manager, Tzigara-Samurcaș ordered the collection into two distinct sections, dedicated respectively to ethnography-proper and sacred art (the latter chapter also took over the religious objects kept at the National Museum of Antiquities). An additional exhibit was to include the Tropaeum Traiani metopes, attesting the Roman Empire's rule over Dobruja. Tzigara's subsequent work as a collector and folk art historian received much appreciation. A 1914 article in Luceafărul journal stated: "[He] reorganized [the museum] and turned into a true national institution. The Museum's rich collections are owed to Mr. Tzigara-Samurcaș's industriousness." In 2010, folk art reviewer Mihai Plămădeală wrote that Tzigara's activity "impacted on everything that this Museum ever meant in the history of Romanian culture."

Tzigara's fieldwork also focused specifically on increasing the museum's ethnographic collection. Particularly active in Oltenia, he was, as Ioana Popescu notes, "more attracted by decorated, colorful objects, used at celebration time." During one such trip to Gorj County, he bought, disassembled and transported back to Bucharest the "Antonie Mogoș House", considered a masterpiece of Romanian woodcarving and the museum's centerpiece. It is the first-ever such relocation in the history of Romanian museums. His photographic collection was expanded by an entire series on Oltenian carpets, which helps in their specific taxonomy. In 1905, he also curated for print an album of "the best routes" to take in Gorj's Vâlcan Mountains, as put together by Alexandru Ștefulescu. At Convorbiri, he became engaged in a dispute with Antonescu over the architecture of Oltenian blockhouses, or cule.

The developments raised interest among the ethnic Romanian community of Transylvania, whose cultural body, the ASTRA Society, was in the process of creating its own permanent exhibit of folk architecture, later ASTRA National Museum Complex. ASTRA activist Octavian Tăslăuanu reported in 1909: "[Tzigara's] national art museum, although [...] important sums were spent on it, is at the early stage of its beginnings. Only two years ago did more systematic work begin for its endowment and presently, its national significance recognized, the state granted it a yearly sum of 14,000 lei [...]. And maybe in a few years those who are running it, so diligently, will manage to turn it into an institution of great importance for our national art." The next year, Tzigara himself wrote, in Convorbiri Literare, that Tăslăuanu's work with ASTRA permanent exhibits was far more advanced than his when it came to storage and display, but noted that the ASTRA collections were not yet rich enough to validate the "museum" name.

=== Aman Museum and Bucharest University ===
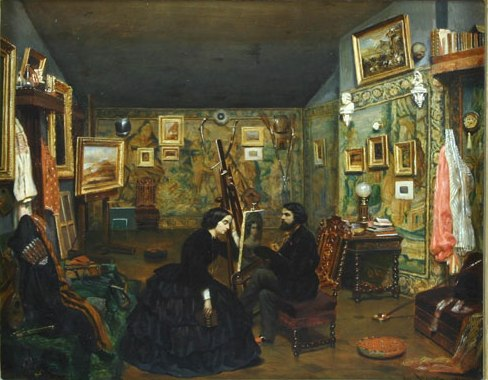
Theodor Aman, În atelierul artistului ("In the Artist's Studio")

During those years, Tzigara was also an inspector and evaluator of works collected from Secu Monastery and the Diocese of Buzău, becoming both a Fellow of the Romanian Royal Society of Geography and the Architects' Society. Tzigara also served as representative of the Romanian curators in European colloquiums: the Public Art Congress of Liège, Belgium (1905) and the Braunschweig Congress on Art Conservation (1906), where he presented a report on the efforts to preserve Romanian monuments. Also in 1906, Tzigara-Samurcaș attended the 8th International Congress of Art History. Once familiarized with the artistic fashions of the day, Tzigara reported to the National Liberal Education Minister Spiru Haret about the need to reform the educational system in such manner as to provide peasant children with an artistic education, citing reasons moral and economical. Tzigara was involved in controversies marking the celebration of Carol I's 40th year on the throne, when he spoke out against politician Ioan Lahovary, accused of mismanaging the Carol Park festivities. Around 1908, he was also involved in the process of cataloging and preserving the body of works left by Romanian painter Theodor Aman. The Aman Museum appointed him director, and, under his leadership, opened its doors to the public for the very first time. Also in 1908, he published the museum catalog. Described by art historian Petre Oprea as "interesting", it featured Aman's biographical sketch.

The creation of a separate University of Bucharest Art History Department for Tzigara was a project which split the academic and political world. At the core of such disputes was Nicolae Iorga, from the History Department, who argued that his own courses also covered art, and who consequently became Tzigara's main adversary. The proposal of expanding University was also defeated in Parliament by Lahovary, the Senate president, who probably still resented for his 1906 comments. The debates prolonged themselves over the following years. In 1909, Tzigara-Samurcaș, Grigore Tocilescu and George Murnu competed with each other for the Archeology Chair, and this created a dispute over whether art historians could not lecture in archeology (Murnu eventually won the contest, despite being exposed for plagiarism by Tzigara, in articles for the magazine Noua Revistă Română). The same year, he was in Sweden, Norway and Denmark, where he visited the Skansen, Bygdøy and Lyngby open-air museums, but suggested that a similar project would be redundant at home, arguing that peasant society in Romania was only too visible around Bucharest. He was much more impressed with the Nordiska of Djurgården, which reportedly became the template for his Bucharest museum.

In 1911 (or 1912), Tzigara eventually became a Substitute Professor of Art History at the University of Bucharest, attending the Great Art Exhibit of Berlin and, in Italy, the Esposizione internazionale d'arte. He lectured on folk art at the Kunstgewerbemuseum Berlin and in Austria-Hungary, at the Vienna Museum für angewandte Kunst. Overall, his mission was to introduce Romanian art to an international audience, as noted by Luceafărul: "he arranged the Romanian pavilions, making known for the first time in history the artistic creations of our people. In all exhibits he registered successes". A prestigious visitor of the National Museum was Raymund Netzhammer, the Catholic Archbishop of Bucharest, who was introduced there by Tzigara, with whom he remained good friends. Netzhammer was impressed with its ethnographic collection: "Nowhere can one acquire a better eye for Romanian folk art than in this establishment."

In support of his activities, Tzigara published a succession of art books. In 1906, Arta publică ("Public Art") appeared in Bucharest, while the German-language study Denkmalpflege in Rumänien ("Historical Preservation in Romania") saw print in Karlsruhe. Later, Tzigara contributed biographical and critical entries in the 1907 edition of Allgemeines Lexicon der bildenden Künstler. Catalogul Muzeului Aman ("The Aman Museum Catalog") of 1908 was followed the same year by the essay Ce se înțelege prin arheologia de azi ("The Present-day Meaning of Archeology") and the monograph Biserica din Filipeștii de Pădure ("The Church of Filipeștii de Pădure", co-authored with Nicolae Ghica-Budești and Gheorghe Balș). In 1909, he authored the album-study Arta în România ("Art in Romania"), comprising his collected Convorbiri essays and edited by Minerva, together with another monograph, Muzeul neamului românesc ("The Museum of the Romanian People"). The next year, he followed up with Discuțiuni în jurul arheologiei ("Debates on Archeology") and Rumänische Volkskunst ("Romanian Folk Art"); in 1911, with Casa românească de la Roma ("The Romanian House of Rome"); in 1912, with Sonderaustellung Rumäniens ("Romania's Special Exhibit"), Istoria artei și însemnătatea ei (Art History and Its Significance"), Muzeul național din București ("The National Museum Bucharest"). Between 1909 and 1912, he also redacted Carol I's 17 volumes of memoirs, working from scattered notebooks. As an art critic for Epoca and Convorbiri, Tzigara became one of those who opposed the new primitivist tendencies of the Tinerimea Artistică group: in 1910, he chided the modern sculptor Constantin Brâncuși for his break with tradition, and even suggested that Brâncuși's works be hidden away from the public eye. Such reactions made Brâncuși decide to leave Romania and begin his international career.

=== 1910s projects and ASTRA conferencing ===
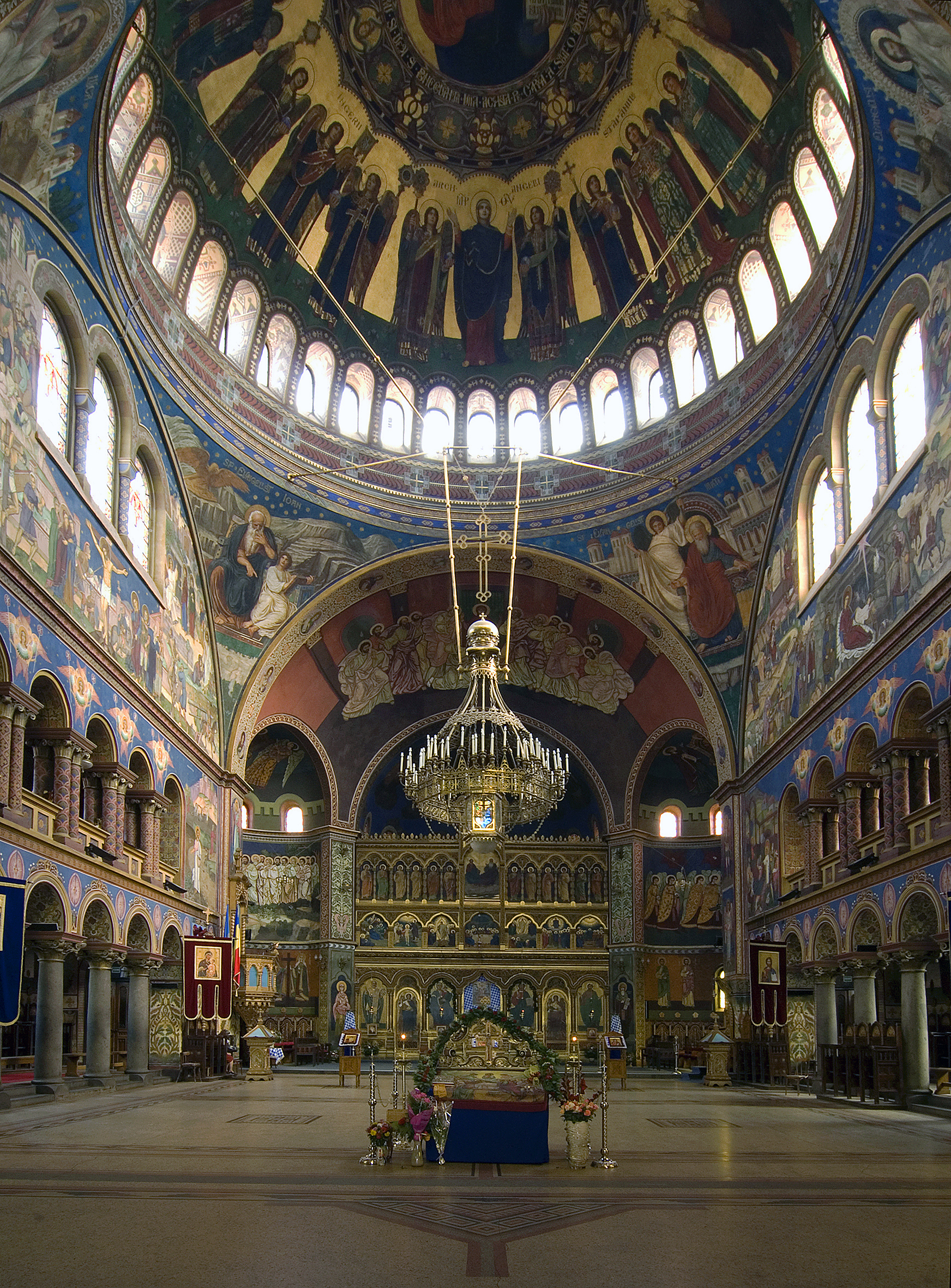
The Sibiu Cathedral, with paintings by Octavian Smigelschi

A 1917 diary entry by historian Ioan C. Filitti condenses criticism of Tzigara-Samurcaș's intense networking: "[He] is no savant, not even when it comes to art, but he knew what our public longs for: smoke and mirrors. The popularization of science, the hosting of some exhibits, a number of sensational polemics, [...] and that's his reputation established. Clever, deft, he had made his way into the Brătianu house (which has to do with a shared taste for national art)." While in Rome, Tzigara was reputedly offered membership in the Freemasonry's Grand Orient de France, to whom many of Romanian colleagues belonged (see Freemasonry in Romania). The offer, Tzigara later claimed, was made by sculptor Ettore Ferrari, and included various perks and a promise that he would soon become a Masonic Grand Master. Although widely rumored to have taken up the offer, Nastasă writes, Tzigara was probably never a Freemason. Also in 1911, he was briefly President of a newly created professional association, the Romanian Writers' Society. Tzigara's honors for 1912 included the Romanian Kingdom's Bene Merenti medal for services to culture.

During much of that year, after some campaigning to obtain state funds, the art historian considered proposals for the Ethnography Museum's headquarters, also housed on Kiseleff. He and his colleagues looked into international proposals, from Heino Schmieden, Louis Blanc and others, but eventually settled for a design proposed to them by the Romanian native Ghica-Budești. The Neo-Brâncovenesc features of the building, researchers note, where themselves an attempt to highlight the return to a peasant model. This formed part of a greater urban planning effort undertaken, with Carol I's approval and the involvement of Neo-Brâncovenesc architects, throughout northern and central Bucharest, with the erecting of many new public buildings: the Palace of Justice, the CEC Palace, the Geology Museum etc. (see History of Bucharest). Despite the approval, and the ceremonial placement of a foundation stone, construction was remarkably slow or under-financed, and Tzigara, who came to resent Ghica-Budești, did not live to see its completion.

Tzigara's scientific work for 1913, when he also attended the Tentoonstelling De Vrouw event in Amsterdam, includes a monograph on the Curtea de Argeș Cathedral Church. That year, as Romania joined the Second Balkan War coalition against the Kingdom of Bulgaria, and although spared from conscription, Tzigara volunteered for service in the Romanian Land Forces. He motivated this initiative by stating that his skill was needed for documenting the war and creating its archive. Tzigara served in the 4th Army Corps, under Crown Prince Ferdinand (Carol I's designated successor).

In 1914, Tzigara was appointed Director of the Carol I Foundation. At around the same time, he began a new series of conferences in Austria-Hungary, lecturing on art for the benefit of Romanians in Transylvania and Banat regions. He was also interested in the collection of Transylvanian Romanian artifacts, added to the Bucharest Museum collection. Initially, he was in Lugosch (Lugoj), informing locals about Romanian folk art. One other such event took place in Hermannstadt (Sibiu), where he was invited by ASTRA to speak about the 50 years of development in Romanian art. He created controversy when he purchased the Romanian Eastern Catholic church in Turea (Türe) from the local parson. According to Az Ujság newspaper, the parson was being "unpatriotic" to even discuss the deal; the same source noted that Tzigara also wanted to acquire a stone church in Fildu de Sus (Felsőfüld), which, despite being built by the Romanian Petru Brudu, showed influences from the Central European Renaissance. Az Ujság asked for the church to be granted special protection by the Hungarian state.

The ASTRA conference contained Tzigara' artistic credo: he believed that art was an objective reflection of social and cultural development, identifying the Westernization process, the proclamation of the 1881 Kingdom and later events with a profound transformation of Romania. However, Tzigara suggested, these efforts did not yet find a suitable answer in the artistic field, that is the birth of a specifically Romanian art phenomenon and the proper conservation of artistic legacies: he deplored the destruction of old Bucharest townhouses and their replacement with Westernized villas; he commended the restoration of Horezu Monastery in its original Brâncovenesc style, but criticized those who introduced Gothic revival elements at Tismana, Bistrița or Arnota; lastly, he expressed support for the "healthy" Neo-Brâncovenesc style of Ion Mincu and criticized muralist Octavian Smigelschi for his work on the Sibiu Cathedral. The conference included ample praise of Carol I as a patron of conservation, and nods in the direction of Carol's French architect, André Lecomte du Nouÿ. The second part of Tzigara's Hermannstadt conference focused on the Romanian school of oil painting. He paid homage to its traditionalist founder, Nicolae Grigorescu, and to Aman, before summarizing the later contributions of Ștefan Luchian, Arthur Verona and Jean Alexandru Steriadi. The third part highlighted his own research of Transylvanian folk art, and spoke about Romania's Queen Elisabeth as a collector of folk art from Sibiu area. Tzigara preserved these principles during the rest of his professional life, and the themes of his conferencing resurface in his old age memoirs. These too shed light on Carol I's architectural role, and express approval for Lecomte de Nouÿ's since-criticized methods of conservation (including the decision to the tear down and rebuild Curtea de Argeș Cathedral). They also return to Smigelschi's murals, criticizing his depiction of saints in national Romanian dress as highly inappropriate.

=== World War I and Germanophilia ===
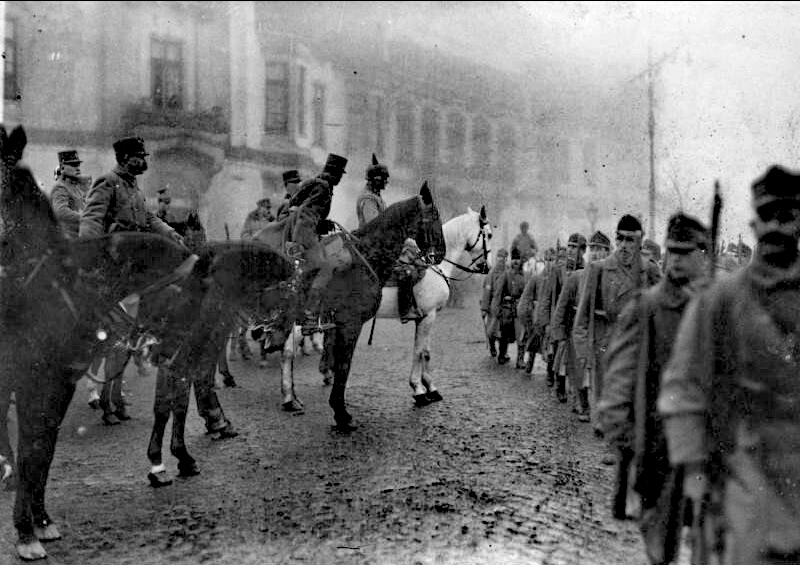
August von Mackensen reviewing Austro-Hungarian troops in occupied Bucharest

Shortly before the outbreak of World War I, Tzigara-Samurcaș was involved in establishing an embryonic Military Museum, alongside fellow historians Vasile Pârvan and Radu R. Rosetti. Tzigara's international and scholarly activities suffered from the conflict, which began in summer 1914—even though Romania remained neutral until mid-1916. His purported father, Carol I, died in September 1914. According to his Archbishop Netzhammer, Tzigara was deeply affected by the event: "Like a child, he loosened his suffering, deploring in front of me this terrible and unexpected loss". By then, however, Tzigara had befriended Ferdinand I, the new king, and was an admirer of Ferdinand's wife, Marie of Edinburgh. He found that Ferdinand was "gentle", "jocular" and usually self-effacing, "in all things the opposite of his uncle" Carol I. In Queen Marie, the art historian recognized a political woman, more active in public affairs than Carol's Elisabeth. Tzigara also shared Marie's artistic taste, including her passion for the work of Romanian Symbolist sculptors Oscar Späthe and Friedrich Storck (whom, in 1903, he had called them "innovators of Romanian sculpture").

Unlike Ferdinand and his Francophile circle, who desired a Romanian alliance with the Entente for the sake of union with Transylvania, Tzigara was opposed to any move against Germany. He represented the Germanophile lobby within the University of Bucharest, at the same junior level as another substitute professor, Constantin Litzica. For a while, he was also co-opted on the leadership committee of the Romanian Writers' Society, but lost his seat there in 1915 (probably owing to his presence among the minority of Germanophile writers). In 1916, he witnessed the Romanian incursion into Transylvania, which saw him appointed as curator of the Sezekely National Museum collection, which had been looted and brought to Bucharest. He made special efforts to preserve this collection and made sure that it was not scattered. Twenty years later, he took pride in noting: "I was the first to take the items from the Székely Museum into my care, and I have given them the utmost consideration ever since."

The subsequent confrontation ended abruptly in southern Romania's invasion by the Central Powers (Germans and their allies). In November 1916, shortly before King Ferdinand and the pro-Entente government retreated to Iași, they appointed Tzigara-Samurcaș a custodian of the Crown and Royal Domains, tasked with preventing acts of vandalism on the occupiers' part. He stayed behind in Bucharest and met with August von Mackensen, head of the occupation forces. As a result of this encounter, the Germans asked Tzigara to discuss an offer of collaboration with the senior Conservative Party Germanophiles: Maiorescu, Alexandru Marghiloman, Petre P. Carp. All three refused to openly associate with Mackensen's military rule, but a puppet civilian administration was set up under Carp's disciple Lupu Kostaki. Carp's reply to Tzigara's proposition is recorded as: "Such a thing is of no interest to me; it is nonsense, and at this moment counts as weakness." Maiorescu's deteriorating relationship with Carp was also a factor: Carp flatly refused to attend any meeting where Maiorescu was present, and alienated the other two by stating that King Ferdinand should be deposed. Maiorescu himself explained that it was a question of principle: "Tzigara has been proposing this to me, but I did not wish to. If [Mackensen] orders me to go, let him send in armed soldiers to take me."

On December 13 [O.S. November 30] 1916, the art historian took over as Police chief in occupied Bucharest. This proved to be a highly controversial decision, the consequences of which would harm Tzigara's interwar career. While his political adversaries later alleged that Tzigara had been granted the appointment through German pressures, he himself claimed that Carp and Kostaki had asked him to become involved. Also according to Tzigara, his appointment resolved a practical issue, since his legitimate predecessor, General Alexandru Mustață, could not speak any German. Kostaki's administration also included Litzica, who was puppet Minister of Education in spring 1917. Tzigara personally intervened in the selection of other bureaucrats. In February 1917, he brought writer I. A. Bassarabescu into his Police apparatus, obtaining his release from German internment and appointing him head of division. Reportedly, he did the same for philosopher Mircea Florian, who became his Carol I Foundation subordinate.

As recorded by Archbishop Netzhammer, Alexandru Tzigara-Samurcaș was open and cooperative in his relationship with the new authorities and the German community. In September 1917, the Romanian scholar greeted Wilhelm II, German Emperor, who was visiting the occupied half of Romania. Reportedly the only Romanian in attendance, he followed Wilhelm to the Curtea de Argeș Cathedral, where they both paid their respects to Carol I's tomb. Tzigara was also a personal guest at the imperial table, and Wilhelm had several long conversations with him in private. At the end of their encounter, Tzigara received from the emperor's hand a diamond-and-ruby tie pin.

Tzigara-Samurcaș nonetheless had a complex relationship with his German supervisors. He refused to cooperate with them on several occasions, objecting to the creation of a German Institute within the University, and being strongly opposed to the Central Powers' interventions on Bucharest Royal Palace grounds. In late 1916 and early 1917, he was in intense correspondence with Ioan Bianu, a fellow scholar and disillusioned Germanophile, who complained about the German Army pressures on the Romanian Academy and asked Tzigara to intervene on his colleagues' behalf. On one occasion, as a result of Bianu's plea, Tzigara sent in his policemen to prevent German soldiers from stealing the Academy's firewood reserves. Boia argues that the main objective of Tzigara's term, "the security of people and property", was competently met. The same is noted by Ornea, who cautions: "the nude fact of his, all things considered, willing collaboration with the German occupier, is still a litigious issue". The Police chief was also critical of his more docile colleagues: as recorded in Marghiloman's diary, Tzigara was present at the October 1917 Athénée Palace gala organized by Mackensen (October 1917), but was irritated to find himself in the company of junior bureaucrats who were well liked by the Germans. He referred to this category, which included poet Luca Caragiale, as the "nippers". In December of the same year, Caragiale enraged Tzigara by going over his head: the poet used German connections to obtain Police guards at an official function, after Tzigara had refused to grant his request.

=== Collaborationism scandal and late 1920s ===
According to journalist Tudor Teodorescu-Braniște, Tzigara-Samurcaș's activities were receiving coverage in the community of the Iași refugees, and came to embody the collaborationist in the collective mind. In January 1918, while the Iași authorities were considering a way out of the war, Tzigara handed in his resignation to the Germans. As noted by his subordinate Filitti, he had been enraged that the German regime would not intervene in his favor during a dispute he had with the "kike colonel" Mauriciu Brociner. A separate peace with the Central Powers followed: in March–April, the new national unity government of Marghiloman reassigned him to the position of Police chief. This posting, made legitimate by King Ferdinand's royal decree, Tzigara kept until November 14, 1918—that is, three days after the Armistice with Germany reshuffled Romania's commitments. During the interval, with only 220 forces under his command, he was powerless to deal with the growing protest movement of Romanian Railways workers.

Romania's sudden return to Francophilia had also brought Marghiloman's downfall, described by Tzigara as an anti-Conservative "coup d'état". Zigu Ornea finds this expression of resentment especially problematic, since, he argued, it meant that Tzigara placed Germanopilia above the establishment of Greater Romania: "[he] understood next to nothing from the reality of the wartime political phenomenon." The end of the war signified a slump in Tzigara's career. His attempt to resume speeches at the Foundation was interrupted by hecklers. His imperial tie pin, Boia notes, became a "corpus delicti" for those accusing Tzigara of treason. Such accusations were given ample exposure in Rector Ion Atanasiu's essay Rătăciri naționale ("National Ravings", 1919), answered to in detail by Tzigara's own pro domo, Mărturisiri silite ("Forced Confessions", 1920), and later by his posthumously published Memorii ("Memoirs"). Athanasiu was the first who suggested holding Tzigara accountable for his wartime behavior, and, in his University report, alluded to the possibility of sacking both him and the Germanophile biologist Victor Babeș. Ornea finds that, in those years, Athanasiu and Tzigara's traditional foe Nicolae Iorga were waging "a veritable war against Tzigara-Samurcaș".

From 1918, Tzigara was allowed to inhabit a new villa, built especially for him as the museum director on Filantropiei (1 Mai) Boulevard 4, where he would spend the following three decades. He was also omitted from an early purge of University Germanophiles, but, on November 29, 1919, was subjected to questioning by Rector Atanasiu, Iorga and the Board of Professors. As he later recalled, his defense tactic was to recall that, back in 1906, Iorga himself was seen as a radical Francophobe (see Sămănătorul). On Iorga and Atanasiu's proposal, but against the advice of Ion Cantacuzino and Dimitrie Onciul, the Board took a vote to ban Tzigara-Samurcaș; the result was indecisive, and Tzigara preserved his chair. Atanasiu however took the vote as evidence that Tzigara had lost his support, and requested a decision from higher authorities. As Boia notes, this was a political miscalculation: the anti-Germanophile lobby had been defeated in Parliament by Prime Minister Alexandru Vaida-Voevod, who could not be expected to grant Atanasiu a victory. In the end, Education Minister and zoologist Ioan Borcea sent a letter to Atanasiu, asking him to desist frustrating Tzigara "in his attributions without legal decision", adding: "Especially at this moment in time, we find it necessary that peace and harmony be restored for University to function properly." These and other moral defeats prompted Atanasiu to present his resignation, which came with his final protest that Minister Borcea had snubbed University during the "Tzigara-Samurcaș affair". In later years, Tzigara took his main accusers, Iorga and journalist Stelian Popescu, to court, in what became two celebrity trials.

As noted by literary critic Dumitru Hîncu, the art historian's wartime conduct was never censured by the interwar governments. In early 1921, he was indirectly involved in Ferdinand's project to redesign the coat of arms of Romania, recommending a Transylvanian Hungarian, József Sebestyén Keöpeczi, for this job. He was again received into Queen Marie's circle, who allegedly told him: "Iorga is jealous that he sees you coming over to visit with us." Tzigara was still an art columnist for Convorbiri Literare, and, in 1921, became its new editor in chief. According to ASTRA's newspaper, Transilvania, Tzigara rescued Convorbiri from bankruptcy, but only catered to a niche audience. He was thus unable to steer the magazine back into the cultural mainstream, its previous dominance replicated by the left-wing Viața Românească. In his private notes, ASTRA man Sextil Pușcariu remarked that Tzigara, though a man of "biting wit", was no match for the recently deceased Maiorescu, and that Convorbiri could never hope to replicate its one-time glory.

In 1923, Tzigara-Samurcaș was the Inspector General of Museums, under the National Liberals' Ion I. C. Brătianu cabinet, in which capacity he revisited the ASTRA Museum and awarded it a 50,000 lei grant from the state. The period also witnessed his first private visits to the Transylvanian spa town, Sovata. His main home in Bucharest was a large villa on Kogălniceanu Street, where he was living with his family. Despite his confirmation at the university, which saw defeating rival Orest Tafrali during a mid-1923 assessment (and again in 1927), Tzigara found it impossible to achieve tenure. He was also ousted from the Fine Arts School over his Germanophilia. As recounted by Pușcariu, in 1925 Tzigara managed to take charge of the Romanian art exhibit in Geneva by outmaneuvering his scholarly rivals Iorga and Henri Focillon. With the diplomatic recognition of Greater Romania came new opportunity, and, in 1926, Tzigara left for Bukovina, taking over the art history department at Cernăuți University. Also that year, a mortally ill King Ferdinand made him a Grand Officer of the Order of the Star of Romania.

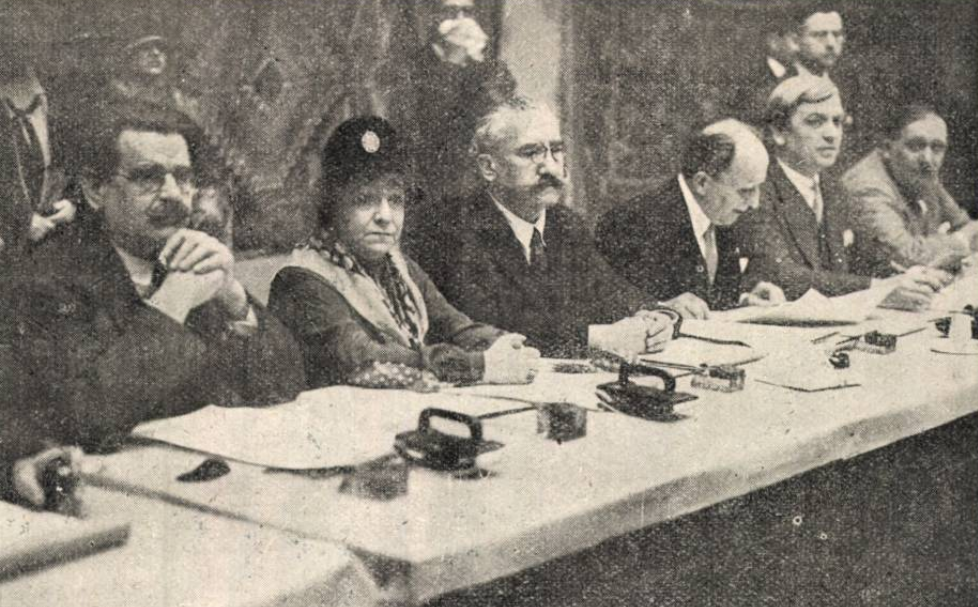
Tzigara-Samurcaș (third from the right, between Alexandru Vaida-Voevod and Liviu Rebreanu) as a judge of Miss Romania (March 17, 1929)

Again touring Germany with a series of conferences (1926), Tzigara also spoke at Radio Berlin, making his debut in radio programming. Reportedly, his request of creating a special Romanian section on Berlin's Museum Island was granted by the Weimar Republic in early 1927. On November 1, 1928, he provided the first-ever Radio Romania broadcast in history, with an art lecture specifically written for this purpose. This, Tzigara recalled, was a pro bono activity to please Radio Romania's president Constantin Angelescu, but made the speaker himself very nervous: Tzigara thought his own text bland and his voice ill-adapted for the medium, but took pains to improve them in later broadcasts. In March 1929, Tzigara was a first judge at the original Miss Romania beauty pageant, in a panel which also included Vaida-Voevod, writers Liviu Rebreanu and Nicolae Constantin Batzaria, woman activist Alexandrina Cantacuzino and other public figures.

Tzigara's personal collection was increased in the mid 1920s, when General Alexandru Tell left him a trove of military items—in 1927, Radu R. Rosetti pleaded with him to donate these to the reestablished Military Museum. Romanian cabinets appointed Tzigara a national representative at the Universal Exposition in Barcelona, Spain, and organizer of the folk art exhibit at the International Peace Bureau's Balkan Conference in Athens, Greece. The former event was embroiled in controversy when Las Noticias newspaper unwittingly Germanized his surname, as von Tzigara-Samurcaș. This enraged the art historian, who believed himself the victim of a prank by Romanian expatriate Mihai Tican Rumano; as reported by journalist Ignasi Ribera i Rovira, Tzigara confronted Tican Rumano at the Exposition, and physically attacked him. Tzigara also attended the 13th International Congress of Art History in Stockholm, Sweden, and organized the Romanian pavilion at an Art Conference in Helsinki, Finland. His efforts won international recognition, and the French state, through Bucharest Ambassador Gabriel Puaux, presented Tzigara with a gift of Sèvres porcelain. He was also awarded the Order of St. Sava by the Kingdom of Yugoslavia.

=== 1930s ===
Tzigara's position was threatened in June 1930, when Ferdinand's deposed son Carol II retook his throne. It was alleged that Iorga, a supporter of the new king, asked for Tzigara to be removed from the royal Foundation, but that Carol had stated not being willing to sack "my own uncle." A dispute between the two men broke out during the same month, with Tzigara proffering "personal insults [...] a result of which Iorga resigned from the position of university rector." Iorga was however in a position to limit his rival's access to academia when, in 1931, he became Carol II's Prime Minister. His legislative proposal, limiting the number of academic positions an individual could hold, was probably aimed specifically at Tzigara and other personal enemies (as Lucian Nastasă writes, Iorga was himself collecting some five monthly salaries from his work with the state).

At around the same time, Tzigara became a contributor to the official literary and scientific magazine, Revista Fundațiilor Regale, and again toured the country with lectures on folk art. With Simion Mehedinți and the ASTRA Society, he returned to the field of public activism with controversial lectures on the biology of the Romanian nation, which sometimes included overt advocacy of eugenics. His racialist theory had it that the geometric abstraction of peasant art, purported to have been strongly resistant to foreign influence, placed Romanians in the "Alpine race" cluster—an idea rejected in its day by anthropologist Henric Sanielevici, who contrarily believed that Romanians were "Mediterranean". In 1933, he was briefly affiliated with the Romanian National Socialist Party and its "Romanian–German Cultural Institute". Tzigara still saluted the Brussels World Fair of 1935 by highlighting the special connection between Romania, on one hand, and, on the other France, Belgium and the Francophone countries. He spoke on Radio France and the INR (he found the Francophone services to be more relaxing, but less organized, than their German counterpart). By 1936, his Convorbiri Literare was engaged in a polemic with left-wing newspapers such as Adevărul and Cuvântul Liber. Involved with both of the latter, Tudor Teodorescu-Braniște alleged that Convorbiri had been remade into a "magazine of the Iron Guard" and tool for Nazi Germany, noting that new contributors included extremists such as Nicolae Crevedia. Teodorescu-Braniște also claimed that, after trying to make his activities under occupation forgotten by the public, including by shaving off his "splendid beard", Tzigara was now brazenly pro-German.

In the 1920s and '30s, Tzigara was host to several foreign researchers. Columbia University professor Charles Upson Clark called his institution "splendid", finding it partly responsible for a "distinct revival" in peasant crafts. He described the museum as "a revelation of the artistic endowment of the Roumanian peasant." French archivist François de Vaux de Foletier visited his museum in 1934, later writing, in Monde et Voyages magazine, that it featured "very interesting galleries of Romanian ethnography". Beginning 1933, Tzigara was several times interviewed by Eugen Wolbe, the German biographer of Romanian kings, who had been sent to him by Carol II. Tzigara also reviewed Wolbe's texts, including his work on Queen Elisabeth (a "weak" study, in Tzigara's opinion), and described the visiting writer as an unreliable amateur: "that pensioned ex-Gymnasiallehrer still had the audacity to select himself such august subjects, with the pretext of 'gaining many new friends for the beautiful country' of Romania, of which yet he himself knew so little!" Tzigara was upset to receive a copy of Wolbe's 1937 work on Ferdinand, which, he claimed, entirely ignored specific criticism; he also approved of Prime Minister Gheorghe Tătărescu's decision to ban the volume in its Romanian edition (the censoring left Wolbe indifferent, a fact noted in one of his letters to Tzigara). Tzigara's rival Iorga, probably incited by this controversy and by his own work with Wolbe, gave the book a positive review in his journal Neamul Românesc, calling the government measure "regrettable", and receiving further criticism from Tzigara, through Convorbiri.

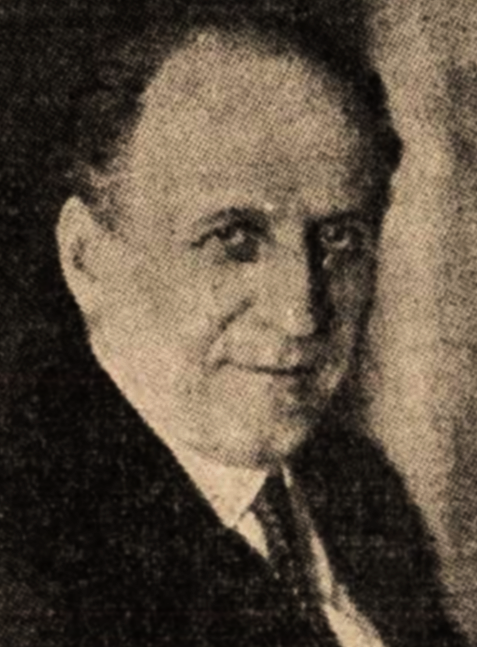
Tzigara-Samurcaș in 1936

The Carol I Museum increased in size throughout the interwar, organized several exhibits, and, in 1931, inaugurated its Ethnographic Section at the new Kiseleff location. In parallel, Tzigara popularized Romanian handicrafts abroad with his new French-language tract, Tapis Roumains ("Romanian Carpets"). Other contributions, published by Convorbiri Literare in 1934, include an introduction to Alexandru Odobescu's posthumous texts, Ineditele lui Odobescu ("Odobescu's Unpublished Texts") and an edition of Odobescu' 1895 suicide note. In 1935, he and journalist Aida Vrioni put out Paradoxele vieții artistice ("Paradoxes of Artistic Life"). Another work, grouping his articles in defense of the Museum's construction, was published in 1936 as Muzeografie românească ("Romanian Museography"). In November of that year, he was in Sfântu Gheorghe as an honored guest of the Szekely National Museum and of the local benefactor, Baron Béla Szentkereszty. Tzigara and cultural historian Nicolae N. Condeescu also left a monograph on the Peleș Castle, Carol I's residence in Sinaia.

As editor of Convorbiri Literare, Tzigara also entered a polemic with a younger Maiorescu disciple, the critic and novelist Eugen Lovinescu. At the root of this debate stood Lovinescu's book on Mite Kremnitz and her affair with Eminescu, seen as a national poet and Junimist herald. Joining in with other conservatives who accused Lovinescu of being a "pornographer", Tzigara claimed to defend Eminescu's image from the book's impiety, although the details had been largely picked up from Kremnitz's own memoirs, as published by Tzigara himself. Lovinescu offered his replies in Adevărul, accusing Tzigara of "literary incompetence", and deploring the decline of Convorbiri beyond the threshold of professionalism: "if, under previous directions, the magazine steered away from its stated mission [...], the deviance was at least made in an honorable direction, that is to say in the direction of history writing; the scientific seriousness of its two former directors had made it possible for Convorbiri to have valid contributions in areas other than literature." In reaction to claims of irreverence, he derided his adversary's artistic expertise as being about "Easter eggs", and defended his narrative as a sample of respect for Eminescu's life and legacy.

In 1932, Tzigara's quarrel with Tafrali became a legal case. Tzigara argued that Tafrali was obligated to deposit a copy of his Monuments byzantins de Curtea de Argeș at the Foundation, even though this legal requirement did not address books published abroad. By 1936, Iorga was pretending not to see his rivals, including Tzigara, at public functions where they appeared together. This was noted by linguist Alexandru Rosetti, who, during one event at Peleș, took Tzigara by the arm and "crossed [Iorga's] path over and over again", provoking his irritation. Tzigara met significant opposition in his bid for Romanian Academy membership, primarily from Academy member Iorga. He was eventually elected a corresponding member in 1938, when Iorga's influence was being challenged by his younger peers. The same year, he was pensioned from his positions at Cernăuți University and the Foundation. In 1939, he dedicated himself to completing his homage to the memory of Carol I, on his 100th birthday: Din viața regelui Carol I. Mărturii contemporane și documente inedite ("From the Life of King Carol I. Contemporary Testimonials and Never-before Published Documents"), called "splendid" by Lucian Nastasă.

=== World War II and final years ===
Also in 1939, Tzigara-Samurcaș resigned from his editorial office at Convorbiri, which was taken over by writer and linguist I. E. Torouțiu. Tzigara announced this change with a final editorial piece, which read: "Satisfied to have insured the magazine's future, we announce at this moment that we are placing our directorial office in the hands of a new generation, which is led by Professor I. E. Torouțiu, [...] who with his valuable and sizable published works, appreciating Junimea's role in the movement to renew the Romanian literary language, will know how to carry on the ever-lasting flame of Junimist ideas". The resignation came some two years after writer Vlaicu Bârna had described Convorbiri as a "living carcass", pleading with Tzigara to bury it.

Tzigara was focusing his research on establishing connections between prehistoric art and folk expressions, especially when it came to Romanian handicrafts. He attempted to underscore this legacy in preparing for the Romanian folk art exhibit, opened in New York City in 1939. He wrote to his fellow custodian Aurel Filimon, asking him to provide modern bronze ornaments that seemed to replicate Hallstatt art. At that point in life, he was pleased with the status and popularity of museology in Greater Romania; in 1937, he had claimed: "all the country is presently a museum". His hostility to open-air museums was by then a thing of the past, since, it was argued, Greater Romania's peasant society seemed threatened by modern urbanization. In the late 1930s, this judgment prompted sociologist Dimitrie Gusti to create the National Village Museum, located a short distance away from Tzigara's own building site. A final moment of preeminence in Tzigara's career occurred during World War II. Initially, with war looming, Chief of the Romanian General Staff Florea Țenescu tasked Tzigara with drafting an Ex-ante International Convention Project for the Protection of Monuments and Works of Art, which was never put into motion.

In summer 1940, during a period when Carol II was trying to calm tensions between Romania and Germany, Tzigara, Ion Nistor, Grigore Antipa, Ion Sân-Giorgiu and other academics greeted a Nazi visitor, scholar Herbert Cysarz. After 1940, Romania ousted Carol II's National Renaissance Front government, replacing it with an openly fascist, pro-Axis regime, the National Legionary State. In parallel, Tzigara managed to gather political support for terminating Nicolae Ghica-Budești's contract and, in 1941, hired architect Gheorghe Ionescu to finalize the Museum's construction. Late in the same year, he was one of the Romanian scholars who welcomed German Romance studies expert Ernst Gamillscheg on his visit to Bucharest. In 1942, he was tasked by Romania's military dictator Ion Antonescu with creating a monumental National Heroes' Cemetery in Carol Park, but the building works were cut short by the reversal of fortunes on the Eastern Front. Also then, he returned to research with a book about the carpets and rugs of Oltenia, which notably stated his ethnic nationalist credo in art: "By using the everlasting heritage of our beautiful folk art in different fields, we will be easily able to get rid of the foreign influences that pervaded Romanian households."

Shortly after the August 1944 Coup deposed Antonescu, the daily România Liberă, which was at the time a Romanian Communist Party tribune, featured Tzigara's name on a list of "national betrayal", which also included Germanophile or fascist intellectuals. He could still publish in Revista Fundațiilor Regale, returning in November 1944 with a study on Dacian art and its historic legacy. Such contributions were panned by the communist Ion Călugăru in Scînteia. As he put it, Tzigara-Samurcaș "has collaborated with Wilhelm II and with Mackensen's occupation troops, [...] and he likewise collaborated with the invasive Hitlerite imperialism. He should not be allowed to continue, neither in public life nor in culture." In July 1946, as a former member of the Romanian–German Association, he was stripped of his voting rights in the legislative election of November. As manager of the Foundation, Dumitru Coman denounced Tzigara, who was still serving as chairman, for libelous claims, as well as for breaching the law on unionization. From August 1946, Tzigara was the subject of a formal investigation, and finally replaced by Nicolae Bănescu on December 11. The pro-communist cabinet of Petru Groza only kept him as honorary director of the museum, effectively stripping him of his responsibilities. At that stage, plans were being examined for the disestablishment of the Peasant Art Section at the Museum, but Tzigara obtained support from Communist-Party man Emil Bodnăraș and from Presidium Chief Constantin Ion Parhon. Tzigara attended the clandestine meetings of the Eminescu Association, a cultural club which doubled as an anti-communist network. Formed through the efforts of critic Pavel Chihaia, it disappeared in 1948.

The official establishment of Romania's communist regime was the start of several new problems for the aging scholar: many of his belongings were taken away during nationalization, others were sold in public auction, while he himself was taken to court by some of his former employees. In 1948, he was also stripped of his Academy membership, and had to renounce his Filantropiei villa. He moved in with his daughter, Ana Tzigara Berza, in an apartment bloc on Dărniciei Street, Rahova. The following year, his pension was suspended, although, in 1950, he was elected to the International Committee of the History of Art. His chief activity, from 1948 to 1952, was the writing of his memoirs. The National Museum was reopened in 1951 as a "National Museum of Folk Art", under new management. Marginalization aggravated Tzigara's illnesses, and, as reported by museologist George Vlad, he died on April 30, 1952 at Filantropia Hospital. This is recorded in some sources as April 1, which would have made him a few days short of turning 80; however, memoirist Constantin Beldie was present for his eightieth birthday, and read him biographical fragments as an homage. Tzigara was buried at Bellu Cemetery, with a small ceremony attended by family and a few of his intellectual friends: Convorbiri colleague Mehedinți, Junimist philosopher Constantin Rădulescu-Motru, physician Daniel Danielopolu and writer Gala Galaction. He had lost his public profile, and the international community was left uninformed of his death: in 1955, an invitation to the 18th Art History Congress was mistakenly addressed to him.

== Legacy ==
Tzigara's contribution as an art historian has received mixed evaluations. According to Lucian Nastasă, his 1911 course at the Bucharest University was the first professional approach to the subject, after the "somewhat organized" attempts on Odobescu's part. Writing in 1920, art historian Gheorghe Oprescu also suggested that, with Nicolae Iorga's reviews, Tzigara's "intelligent articles" were the only ones in the Romanian press to properly educate the public taste. Charles Upson Clark also rated "Tzigara-Samurcash" as one of Romania's "best-known modern writers" in the field of archeology or ancient art, with Alexandru Lapedatu, George Murnu and Abgar Baltazar. Contrarily, a later assessment made by ethnologist Romulus Vulcănescu rated both Tzigara, Iorga and Oprescu as authors of "ethnological essayistics and cultural microhistory", who lacked a global approach to folk art research. Dumitru Hîncu, writing in 2007, noted that, once "a first-rate cultural figure", Alexandru Tzigara-Samurcaș "no longer says a great deal for your average present-day reader". The art historian's figure inspired literary critic George Călinescu in writing his novel Scrinul negru, about the decline of Romanian aristocracy. A more unusual trace of his activity is preserved in Tzigara-Samurkasch, the name of a fictional place in the writings of Bukovina native Gregor von Rezzori. A comment left by Tzigara in his Peleș Castle book has fueled cyberculture speculation and an urban legend about the existence of 20 lei coins from the 1860s, which are supposedly extremely valuable items.

Tzigara-Samurcaș's Museum building was only finished after his death, later in the 1950s. By the time of its completion, however, the building's purpose had changed, and, historian Andrei Pippidi writes, it "passed through the most humiliating of its stages". Its collections were moved to a new location, and, in 1978, merged into the Village Museum. The Kiseleff building was assigned to the "Lenin–Stalin Museum", which later became the Communist Party Museum. Shortly after the Romanian Revolution of 1989 toppled communism, the Salvation Front Minister of Culture Andrei Pleșu created, on National Museum grounds, a Museum of the Romanian Peasant, which he placed under the direction of painter Horia Bernea. It was officially inaugurated in 1993. Although sometimes described as Tzigara's successor, Bernea, helped by ethnologist Irina Nicolau, merged the scientific function into a conceptual art project, which is described by various commentators as a radical break with the interwar National Museum.

According to Lucian Boia, Tzigara's work with the Germans in World War I continues to be perceived as a stain on his career, and was as such omitted from official histories which deal with the period. This, Boia notes, happened especially during the latter, nationalist stage of Romanian communism, when World War I was presented as a moment of anti-German "unanimity". However, the period also brought occasional homages, such as a 1978 symposium at the National Museum of Art of Romania (introducing him as "one of our century's great art historians"), as well as the publication of Tzigara's collected Scrieri despre arta românească ("Writings on Romanian Art", 1987). The first installment of Tzigara-Samurcaș's memoirs was first published in 1999, ten years after the Revolution, by Grai și Suflet imprint. Later volumes saw print with Editura Meridiane. These works have raised interest for their historical and biographical content, but, Zigu Ornea contends, are largely without literary value. Ornea also criticized the two editors, Ioan and Florica Șerb, for only including some citations from Tzigara's contemporaries as notes, instead of a more complete critical apparatus. Editura Vitruviu also published another volume of Tzigara's memoirs, as Lupta vieții unui octogenar ("An Octogenarian's Lifelong Combat", 2007).

A large part of his photographic plates ended up as a special fund of the Ion Mincu University of Architecture and Urbanism. In May 2010, they were inventoried and published, in print and DVD format, as Arhiva Alexandru Tzigara-Samurcaș. A selection of these works was displayed in 2011, during a special Museum of the Romanian Peasant exhibit, sponsored by the Romanian Cultural Institute. The rest, preserved by the Fine Arts School, were donated to the Museum of the Romanian Peasant in 2000. A Tzigara-Samurcaș Foundation was created with the goal of preserving folklore and handicrafts. Its projects include the revival of Ocna Șugatag hore and the Ethnophone folk music events, sponsored by the European Union's Culture 2000.

Tzigara's son, Sandu Tzigara-Samurcaș (born on October 18, 1903), had trained as a jurist and worked at the Foundation as a legal adviser. The husband of poet Adrienne Prunkul, Sandu was especially known for his 1943 poetry volume Culesul de apoi ("The Latter-day Reaping"). He published a number of volumes in either Romanian or French, appearing into the 1970s. His Bucharest salon braved communist censorship and, in the 1950s, hosted poets such as Ion Barbu and Nichita Stănescu. He had two sisters, of whom Ana had become, in 1935, the wife of folklorist Marcu Berza. Settled with her husband in Italy until her death in 1967, she established her reputation as a post-Impressionist painter and, after the 1989 Revolution, had her retrospective exhibition at the Museum of the Romanian Peasant. Maria, Tzigara's other daughter, was a violinist for the Romanian Film Orchestra, married into the Berindei family (and thus became related to historians Dan and Mihnea Berindei). Sandu, who died on April 23, 1987, was buried at Samurcășești Monastery in Ciorogârla as "the last of the Samurcaș family descendants".
