= Uibărești =

- Location within Romania

Location
- Country: Romania
- Counties: Hunedoara County
- Villages: Bulzeștii de Sus, Bulzeștii de Jos, Uibărești

Physical characteristics
- Source
  - location: Bihor Mountains
- Mouth: Ribița
  - coordinates: 46.1952°N 22.7756°E
- Length: 22 km (14 mi)
- Basin size: 55 km^{2} (21 sq mi)

Basin features
- Progression: Ribița→ Crișul Alb→ Körös→ Tisza→ Danube→ Black Sea
- Tributaries
  - left: Bulz

The Uibărești is a right tributary of the river Ribița in Romania. It flows into the Ribița near the village Uibărești. Its length is 22 km (14 mi) and its basin size is 55 km^{2} (21 sq mi).
