= Tomnatec =

Tomnatec may refer to two villages in Romania:

- Tomnatec, a village in Bistra Commune, Alba County
- Tomnatec, a village in Bulzeștii de Sus Commune, Hunedoara County

== See also ==
- Tomnatic
