= Grohot =

Grohot may refer to:

- Grohot, a village in the commune of Bulzeștii de Sus, Romania
- Grohot, Croatia, a village near Desinić
