= Tomnatek =

Tomnatek is the Hungarian name for two villages in Romania:

- Tomnatic village, Vadu Crișului Commune, Bihor County
- Tomnatec village, Bulzeștii de Sus Commune, Hunedoara County
