= Ribița (river) =

- Location within Romania

Location
- Country: Romania
- Counties: Hunedoara County
- Villages: Tomnatec, Ribicioara, Ribița

Physical characteristics
- Source: Bihor Mountains
- Mouth: Crișul Alb
  - location: Ribița
  - coordinates: 46.1731°N 22.7578°E
- Length: 20 km (12 mi)
- Basin size: 118 km^{2} (46 sq mi)

Basin features
- Progression: Crișul Alb→ Körös→ Tisza→ Danube→ Black Sea
- Tributaries
  - left: Morgașu
  - right: Jgheboasa, Uibărești

The Ribița is a right tributary of the river Crișul Alb in Romania. It discharges into the Crișul Alb in Ribița. Its length is 20 km (12 mi) and its basin size is 118 km^{2} (46 sq mi).
