= Boisbaudran =

Boisbaudran is a surname. Notable people with the surname include:

- Horace Lecoq de Boisbaudran (1802–1897), French artist and teacher
- Paul Emile Lecoq de Boisbaudran (1838–1912), French chemist
