= Apcar Baltazar =

Romanian artist (1880–1909)

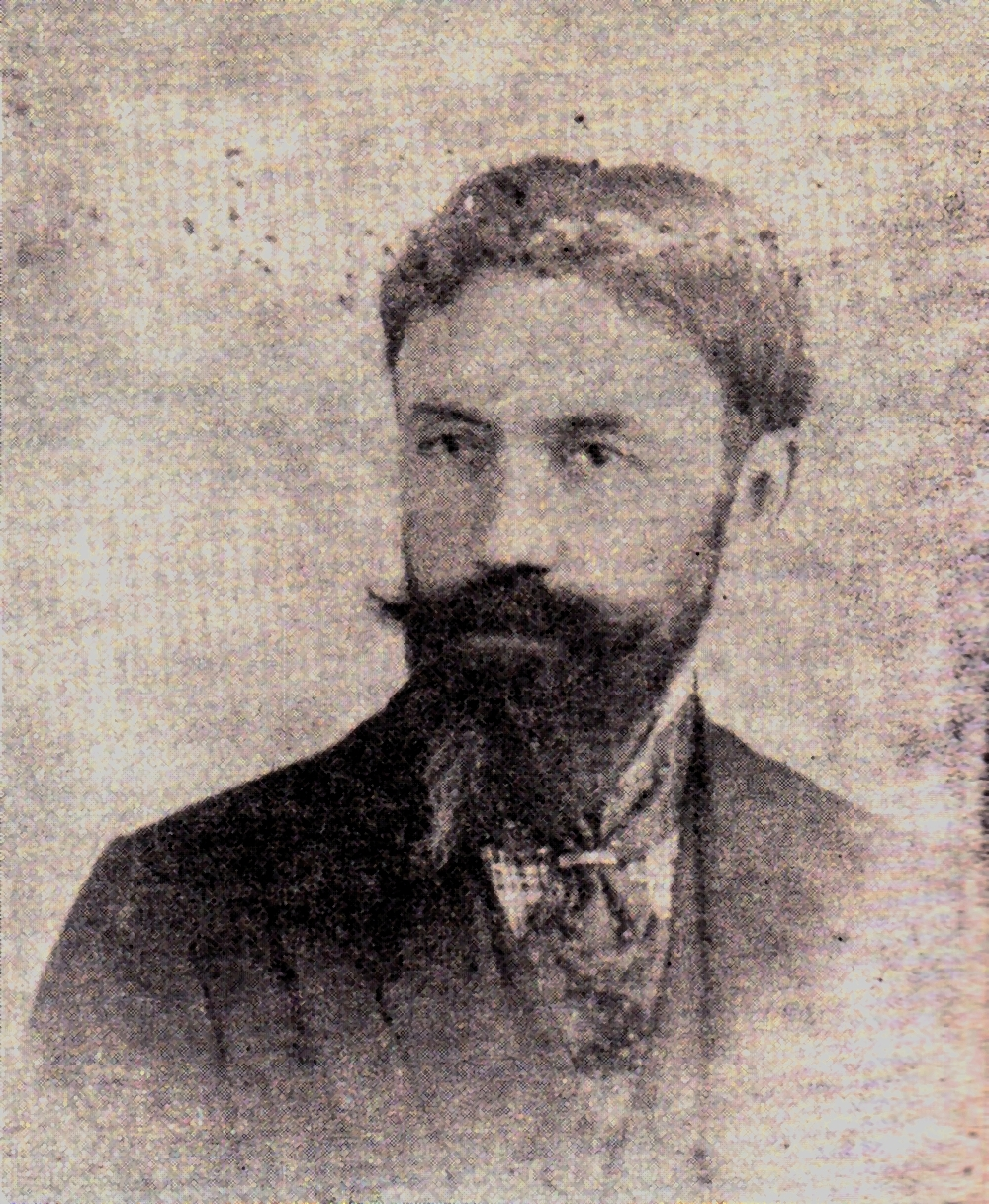
- Baltazar, c. 1900
- Born: 26 February 1880; Bucharest, Romania
- Died: 26 September 1909 (aged 29); Bucharest, Kingdom of Romania
- Education: Bucharest National University of Arts; George Demetrescu Mirea; Alexandru Tzigara-Samurcaş
- Known for: painter, art critic, essayist, illustrator, muralist, ceramist
- Movement: Realism, Post-Impressionism, Expressionism, Symbolism, Art Nouveau

Apcar Baltazar (26 February 1880 – 26 September 1909) was a Romanian painter and art critic of Armenian parentage. His first name is often spelled Abgar, due to differing transliterations from Armenian.

== Biography ==
He was born into a family of shopkeepers. From 1891 to 1896, he attended the "Cantemir Vodă" Gymnasium, where he received high grades in his drawing classes.

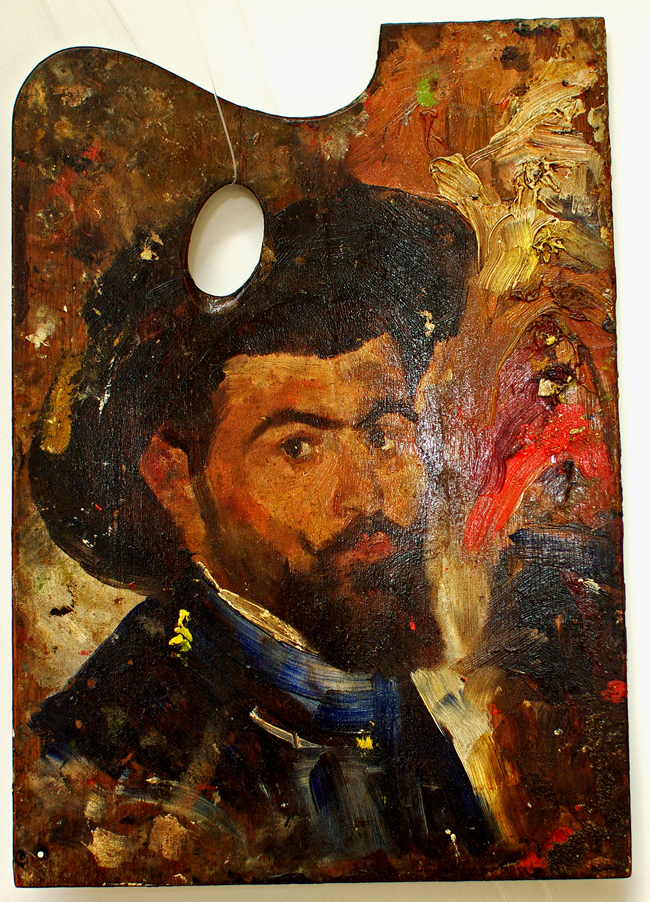
Self-portrait on a palette

After winning a scholarship competition at the "National School of Fine Arts" (now known as the Bucharest National University of Arts), he studied with George Demetrescu Mirea and graduated in 1901. He also made the acquaintance of art historian Alexandru Tzigara-Samurcaș, who introduced him to Romanian folk art. Over the next year, he applied twice at the "Ministry of Religion and Public Instruction" for a scholarship to study abroad, but was denied both times.

In 1903, he had his first showing at an exhibition held by "Tinerimea artistică" (Artistic Youth). That same year saw the beginning of a journal called Voința națională (The National Will) where his friends Ilarie Chendi and Emil Gârleanu gave him critical exposure. He also worked as a clerk for a year at the above-mentioned Ministry before tendering his resignation. From 1904 to 1905, he became a contributor to his friends' journal.

In 1907, he had his first solo exhibition at the Sala Ateneului. He also began working as a regular columnist for the magazine Viața Românească, where he wrote about the art industry, art education, trends in style and other topics. He also wrote articles for the journal Convorbiri Literare (Literary Talk). Later that year, he entered a contest for a position in the decorative arts department at the School of Fine Arts, but his works were stolen the day before judging and he had to withdraw.

In 1909, his former employers at the Ministry of Religion sent him to Horezu Monastery to study the condition of its art works and write a report for the "Bulletin of the Historical Monuments Commission". He was preparing to do further studies on other historical monuments and travel to Paris to research methods of restoration, but died of an unspecified heart ailment.

A major retrospective of his work was held at the National Museum of Art of Romania to celebrate his birth centennial in 1980.

== Selected paintings ==
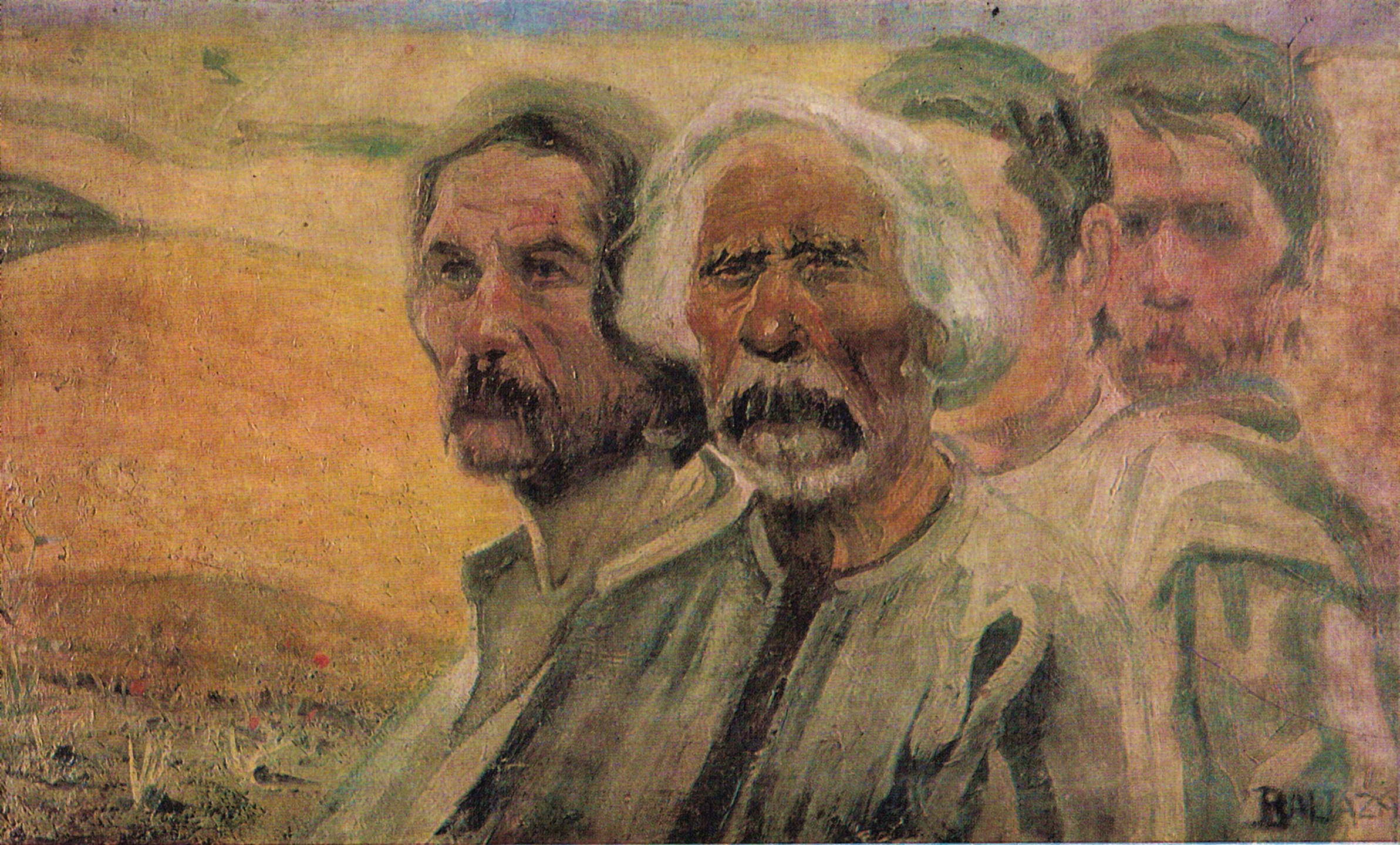
Peasants

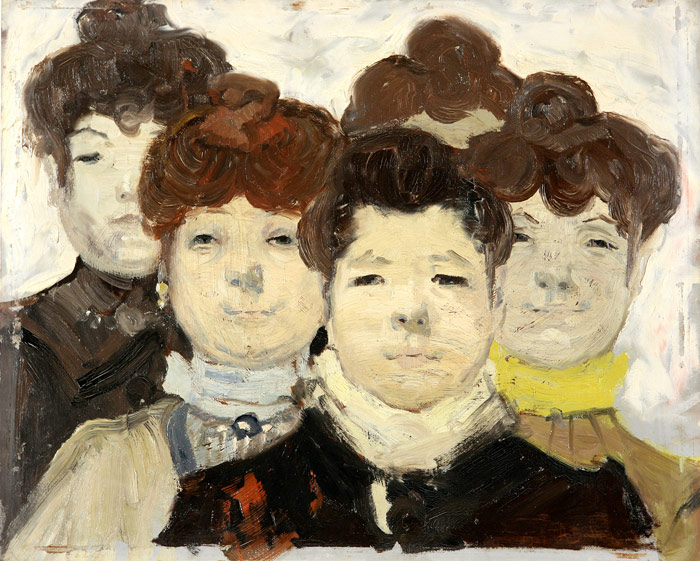
Women of Haimanale

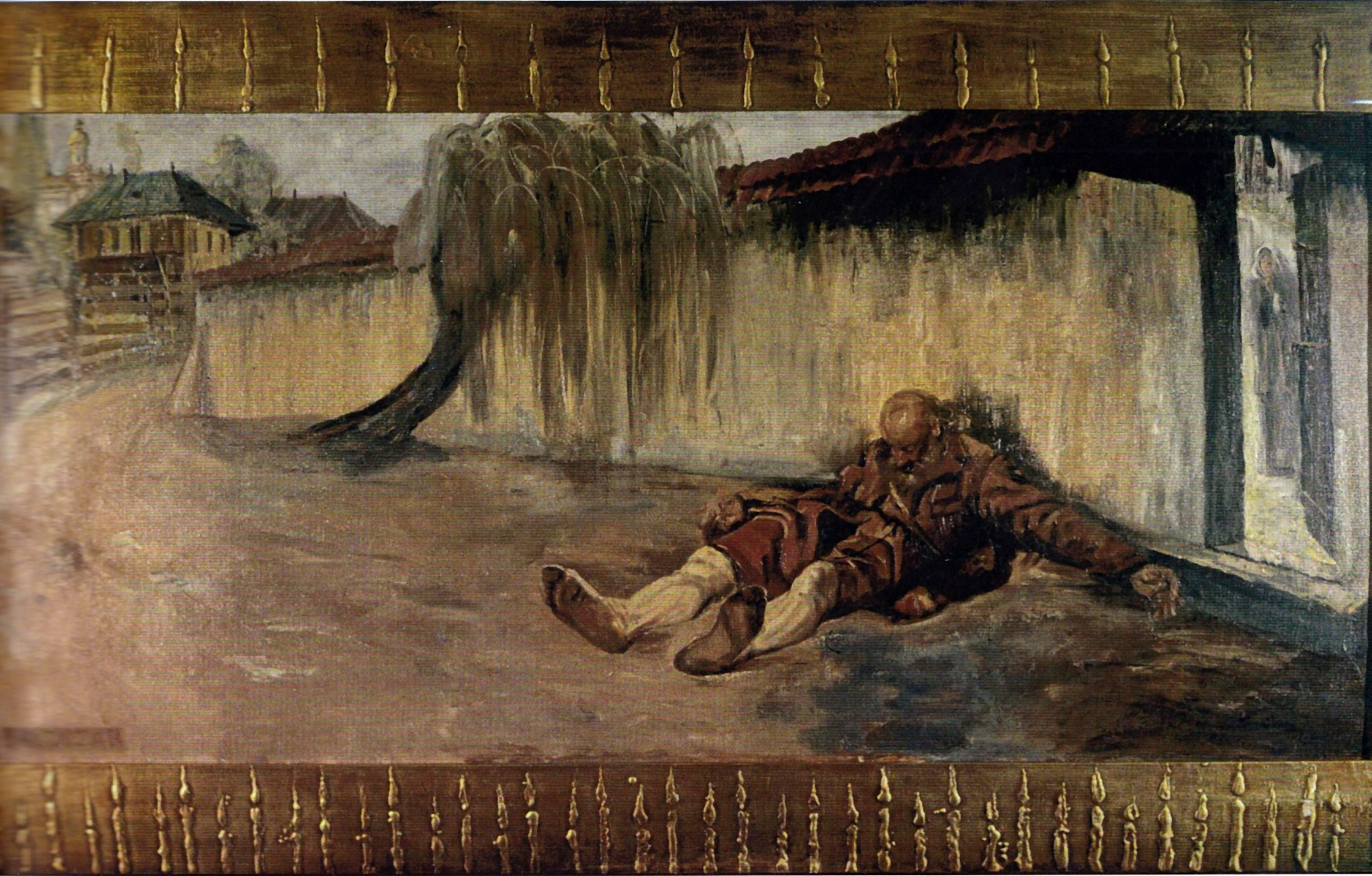
The Death of Lumânărică, from a story by Constantin Negruzzi
