= National Museum of the Romanian Peasant =

Ethnographic and historic museum in Bucharest

- Muzeul Național al Țăranului Român
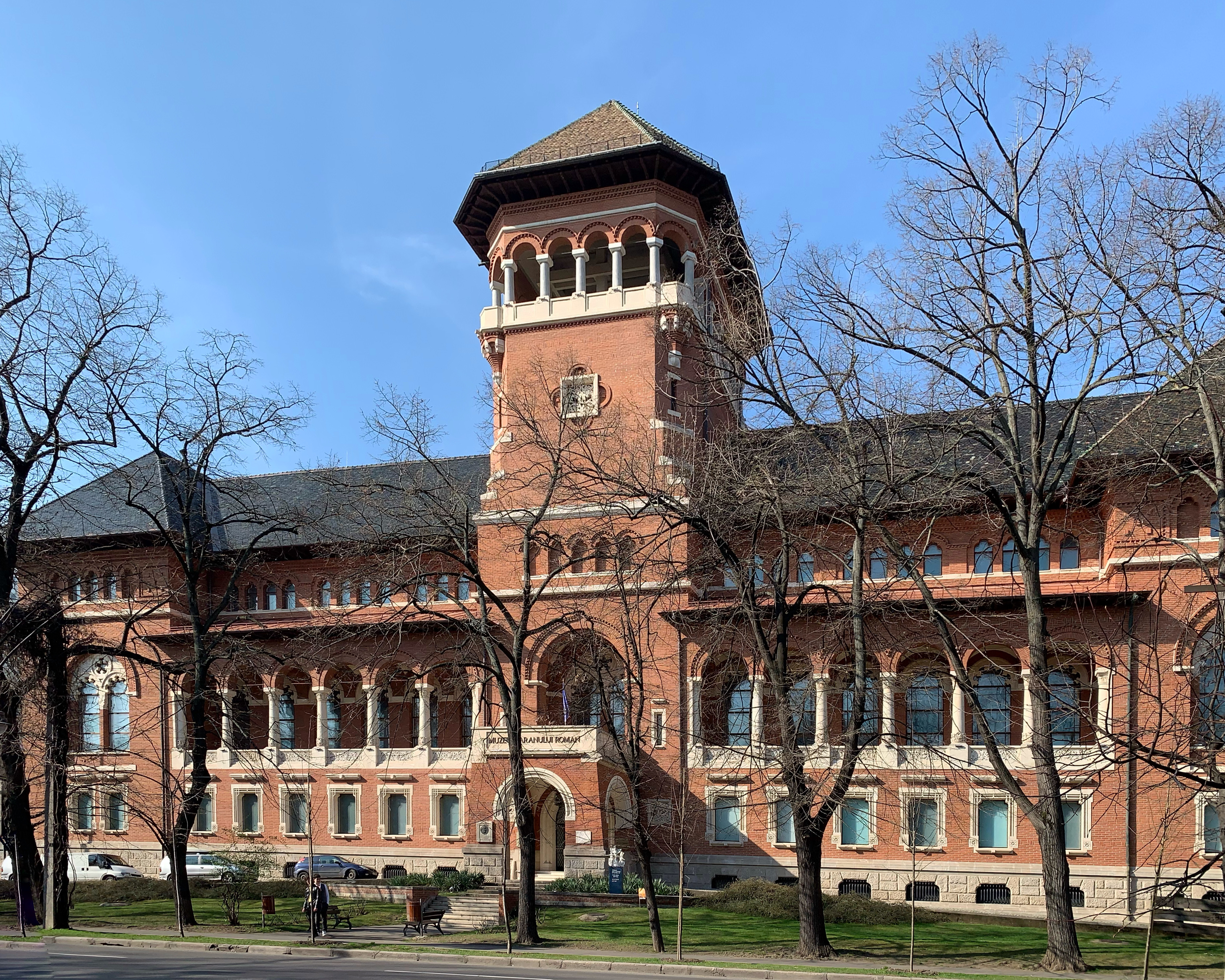
- Front facade of the National Museum of the Romanian Peasant, facing the Șoseaua Kiseleff
- Former name: Muzeul Țăranului Român (Museum of the Romanian Peasant)
- Established: 1906
- Location: Șoseaua Kiseleff, Bucharest, Romania
- Coordinates: 44°27′16″N 26°05′02″E
- Type: Ethnographic museum
- Website: muzeultaranuluiroman.ro/en/home/

The National Museum of the Romanian Peasant (Romanian: Muzeul Național al Țăranului Român) is a museum in Bucharest, Romania, with a collection of textiles (especially costumes), icons, ceramics, and other artifacts of Romanian peasant life. One of Europe's leading museums of popular arts and traditions, it was designated "European Museum of the Year" for 1996.

== Description ==
Located on Șoseaua Kiseleff, near Piața Victoriei, the museum falls under the patronage of the Romanian Ministry of Culture. Its collection includes over 100,000 objects.

First founded in 1906 by and originally managed by Alexandru Tzigara-Samurcaș, the museum was reopened 5 February 1990, a mere six weeks after the downfall and execution of Nicolae Ceaușescu. During the Communist era, the building housed a museum representing the country's Communist party; the museum's basement still contains a room devoted to an ironic display of some artifacts from that earlier museum. The building, which uses traditional Romanian architectural features, was built on the former site of the State Mint (Monetăria Statului). Initially intended as a museum of Romanian art, it was designed by Nicolae Ghica-Budești and built between 1912 and 1941. The building is listed as a historic monument by Romania's Ministry of Culture and National Identity.

The museum was devastated during the June 1990 Mineriad, due to being confused with the headquarters of the National Peasants' Party.

One of the museum's most famous exhibits—originally the work of Tzigara-Samurcaș—is "the house in the house". The house, which originally belonged to peasant Antonie Mogos of Ceauru village in Gorj County. From the first, the house was displayed in a non-naturalistic way: objects that would normally be in the interior were displayed in various manners outside; outbuildings were suggested by fragments. The Communist regime displayed the house much more conventionally, outdoors at the Village Museum; it returned to the Museum of the Romanian Peasant in 2002. The current display at the museum revives the original non-naturalistic approach. For example, from a platform, museum visitors may peer into the attic, part of whose wall is stripped away; various objects are arranged inside.

In 2002, the museum's exhibit space was greatly expanded as the museum store and offices moved into a new building behind the old one, freeing up a considerable amount of floor space in the museum proper.

== Gallery ==
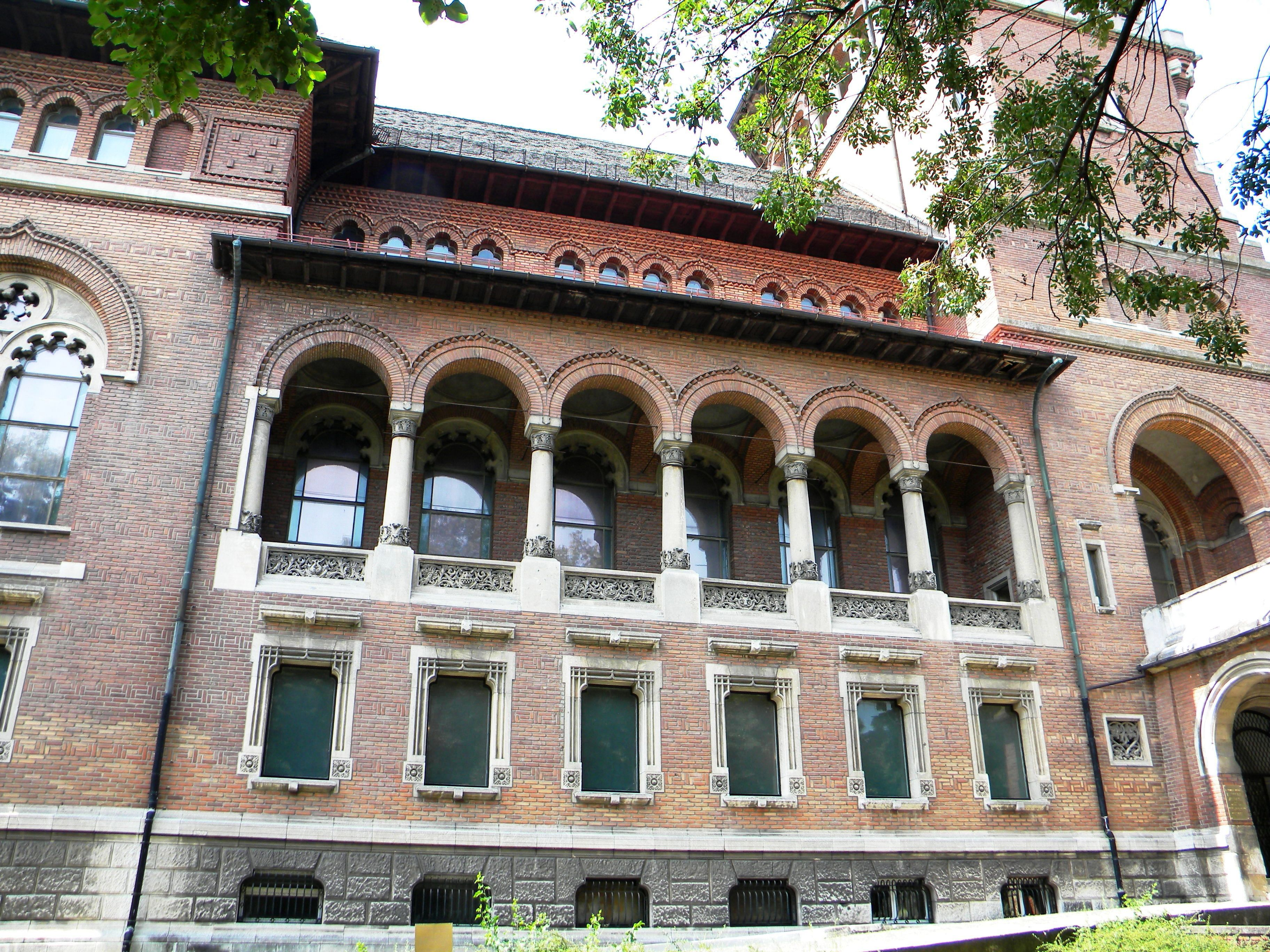
The museum is built in Neo-Romanian style

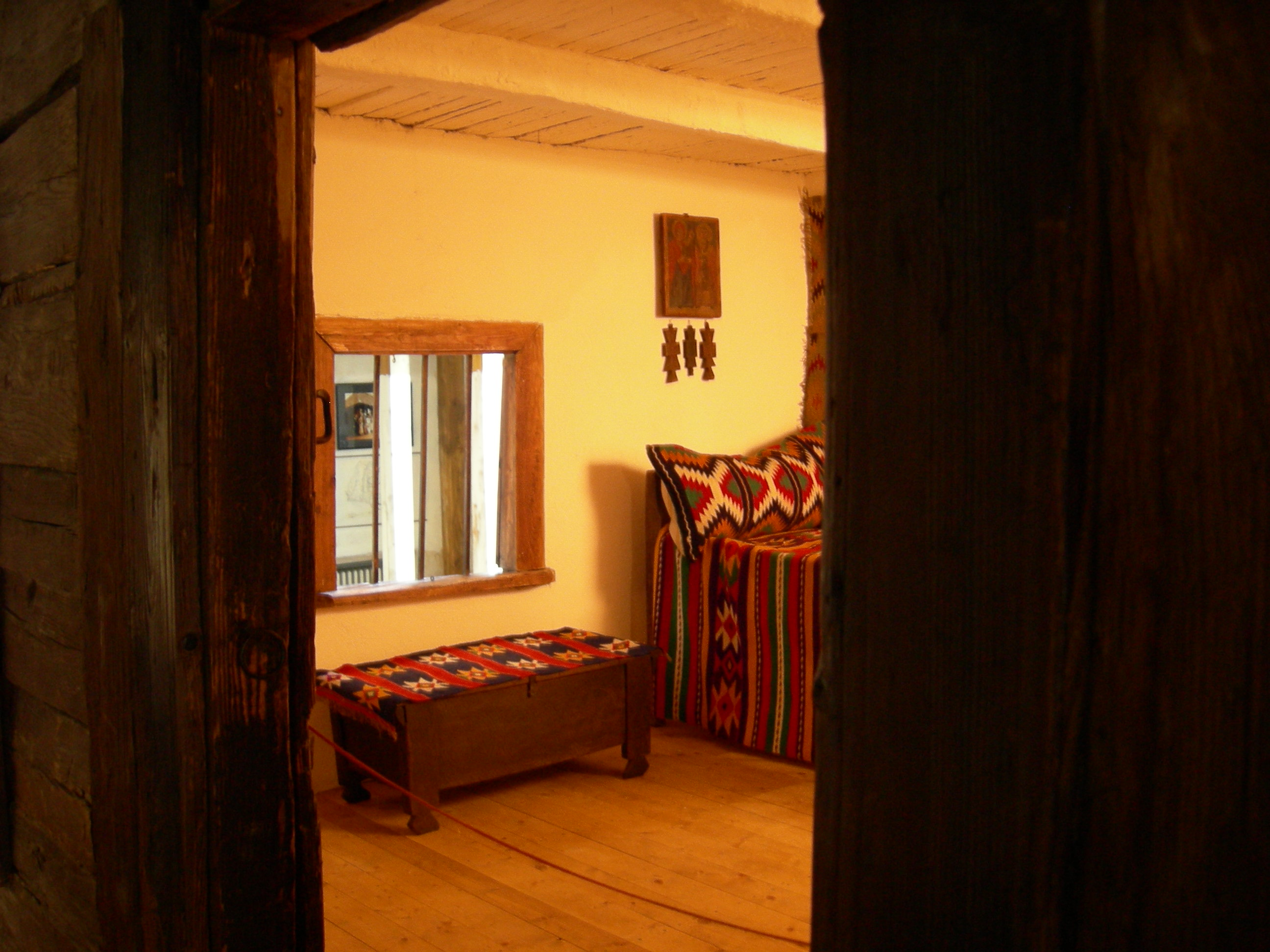
"The house in the house"

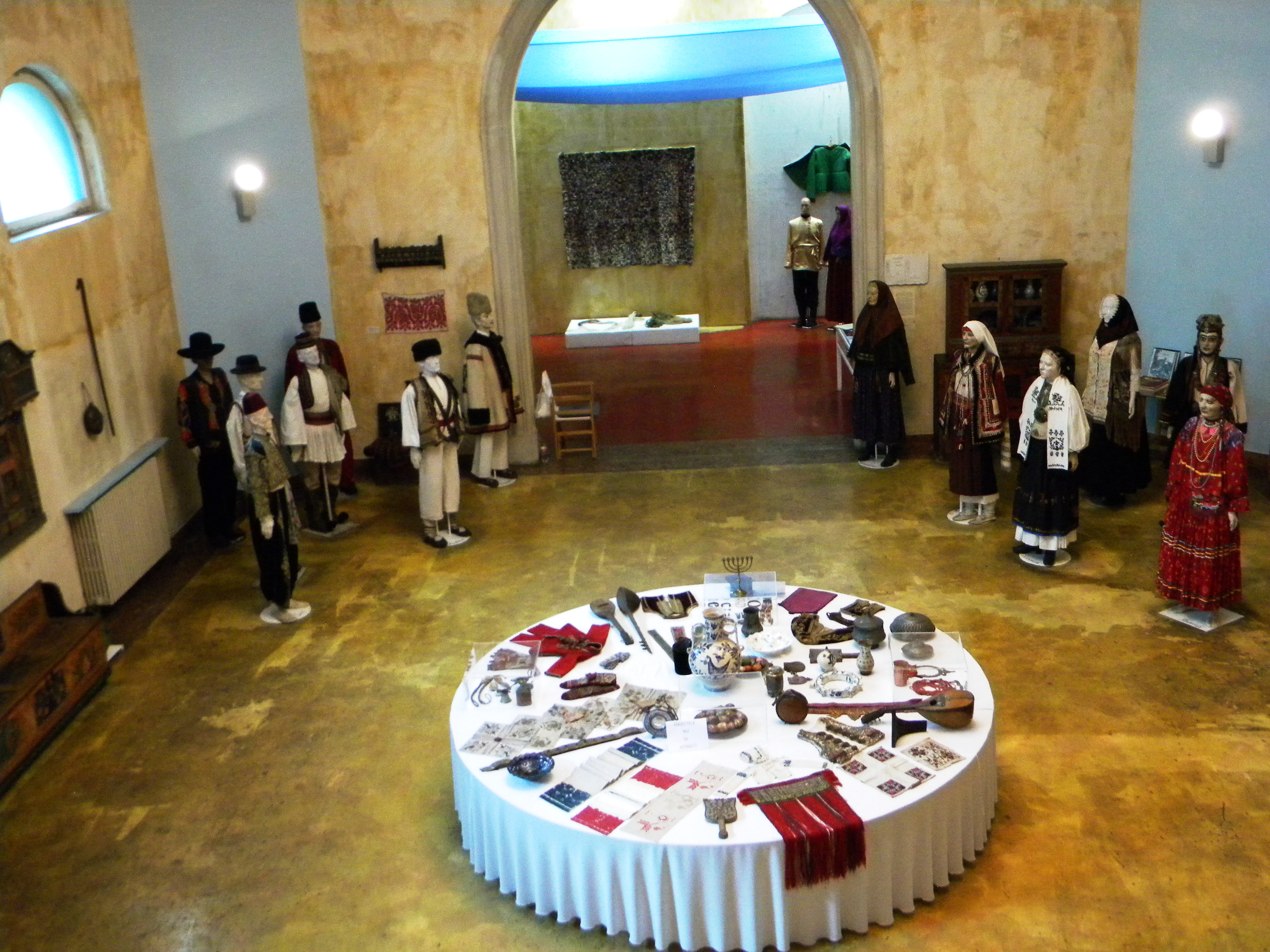

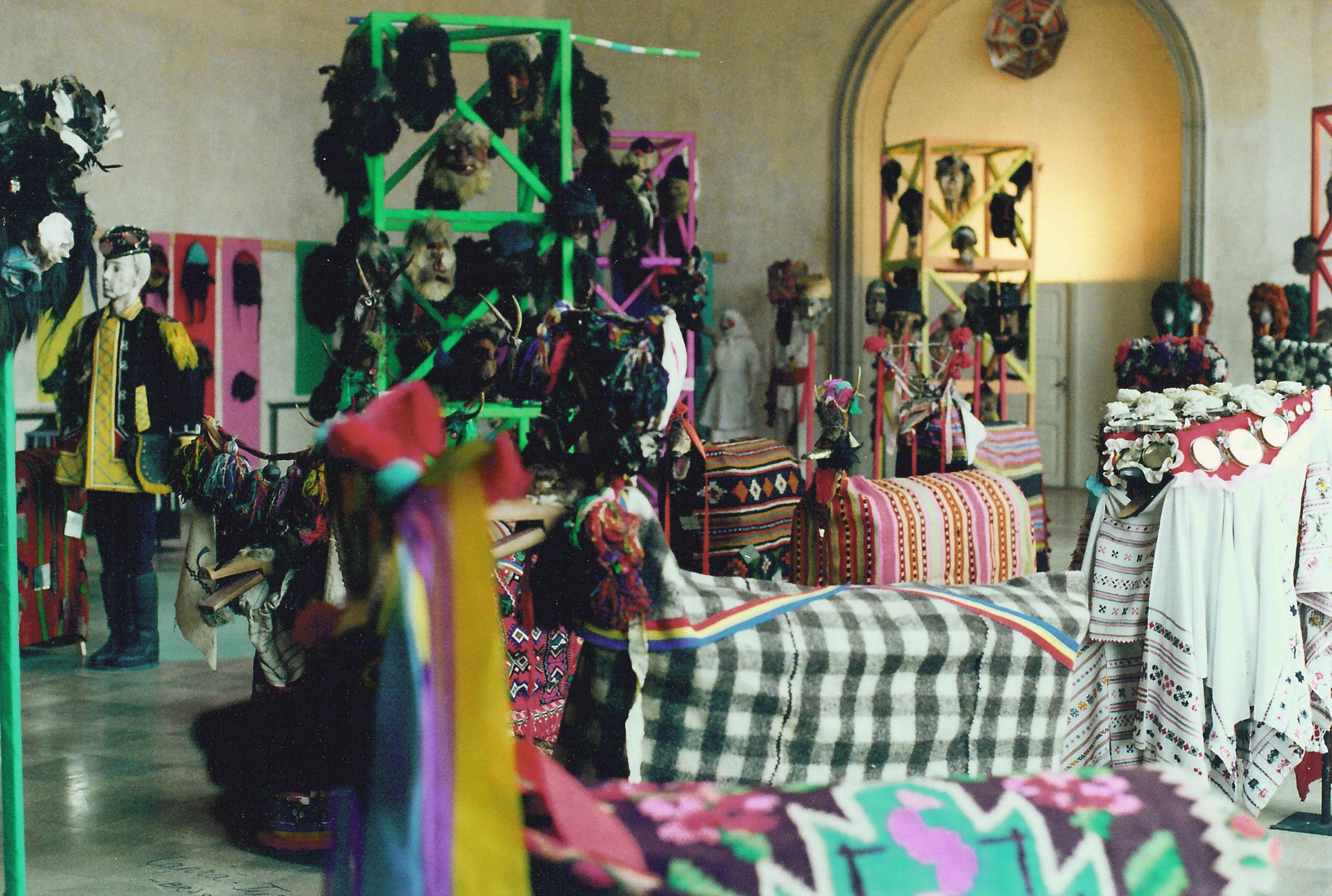

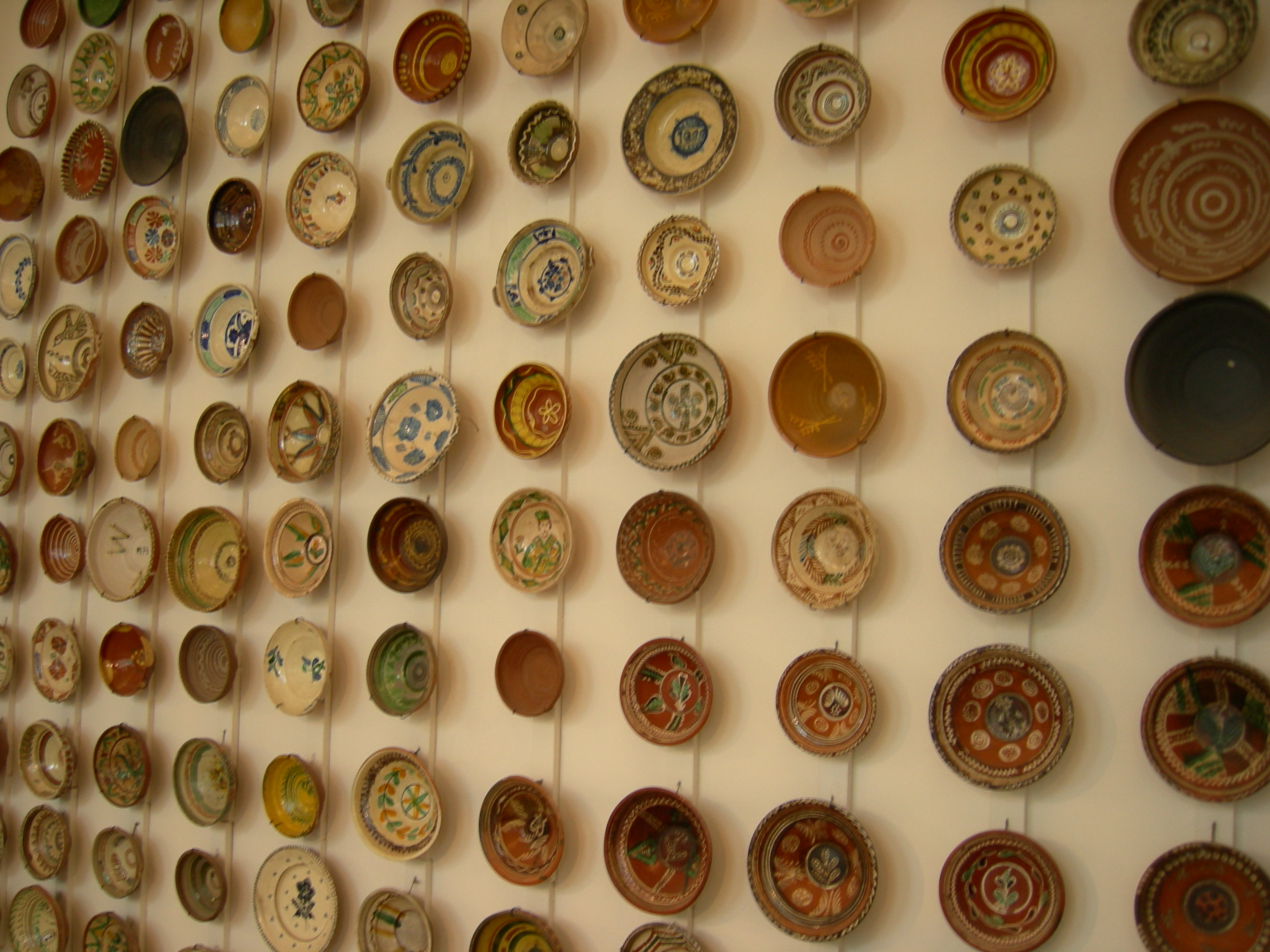

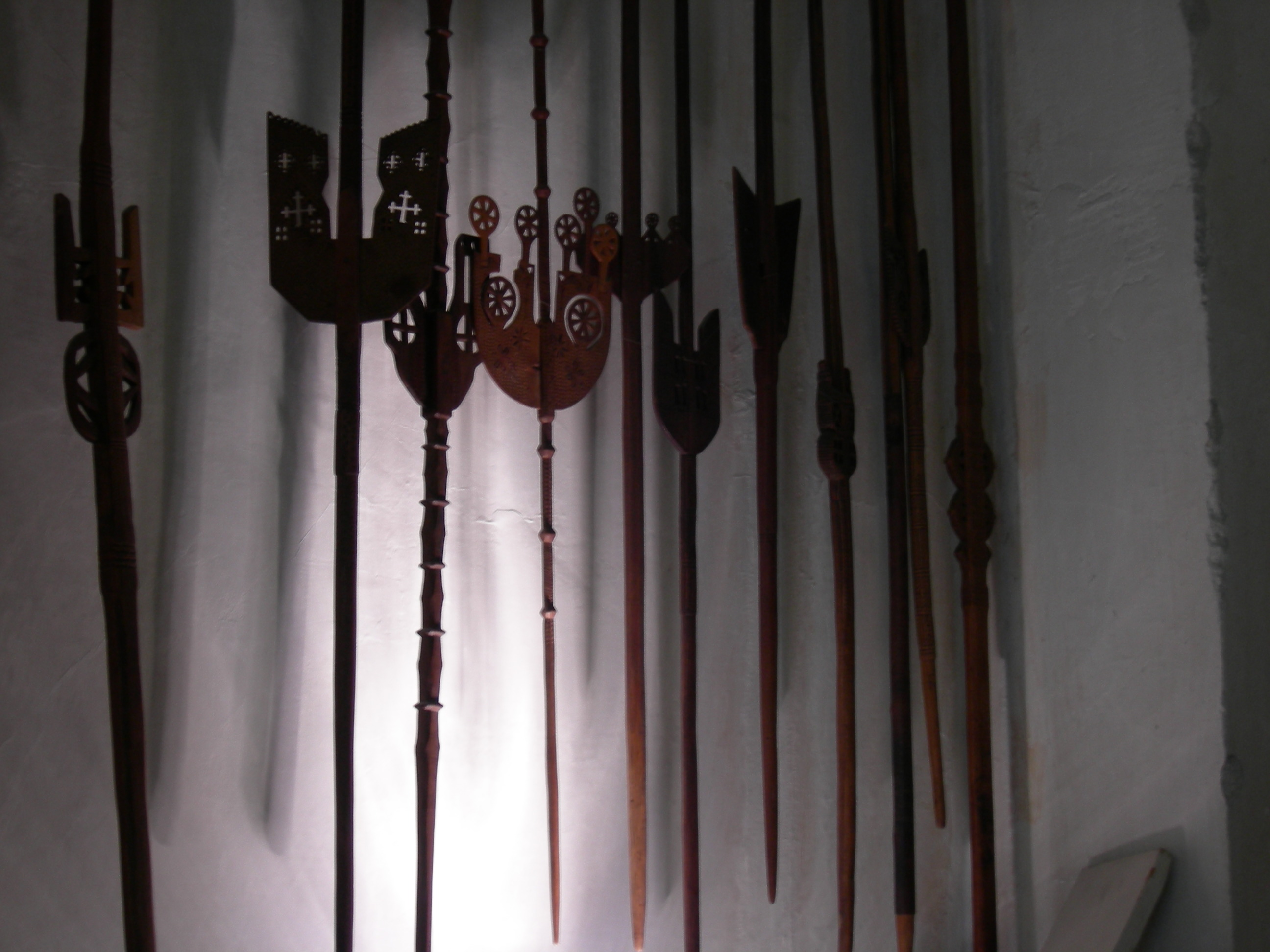

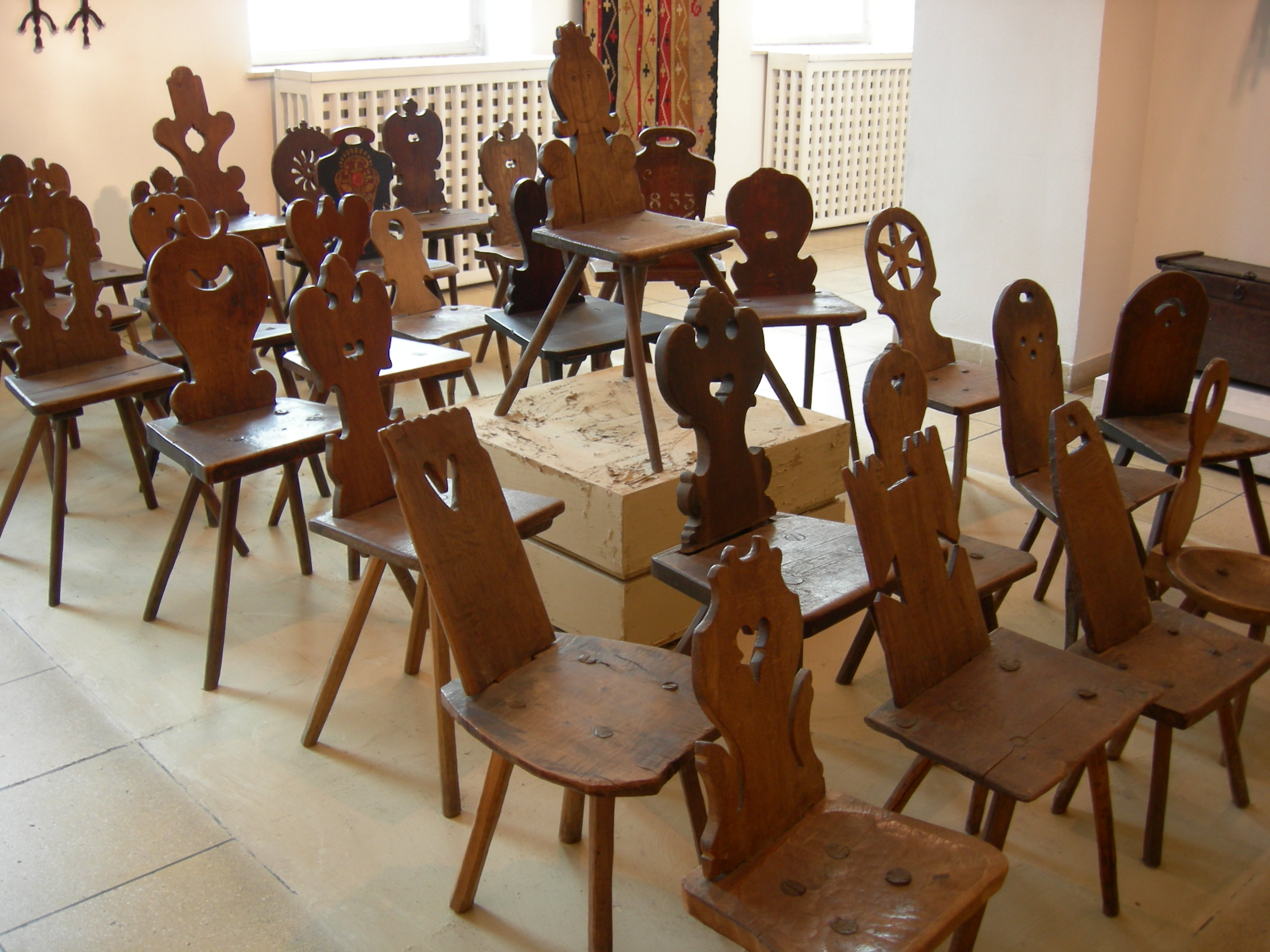

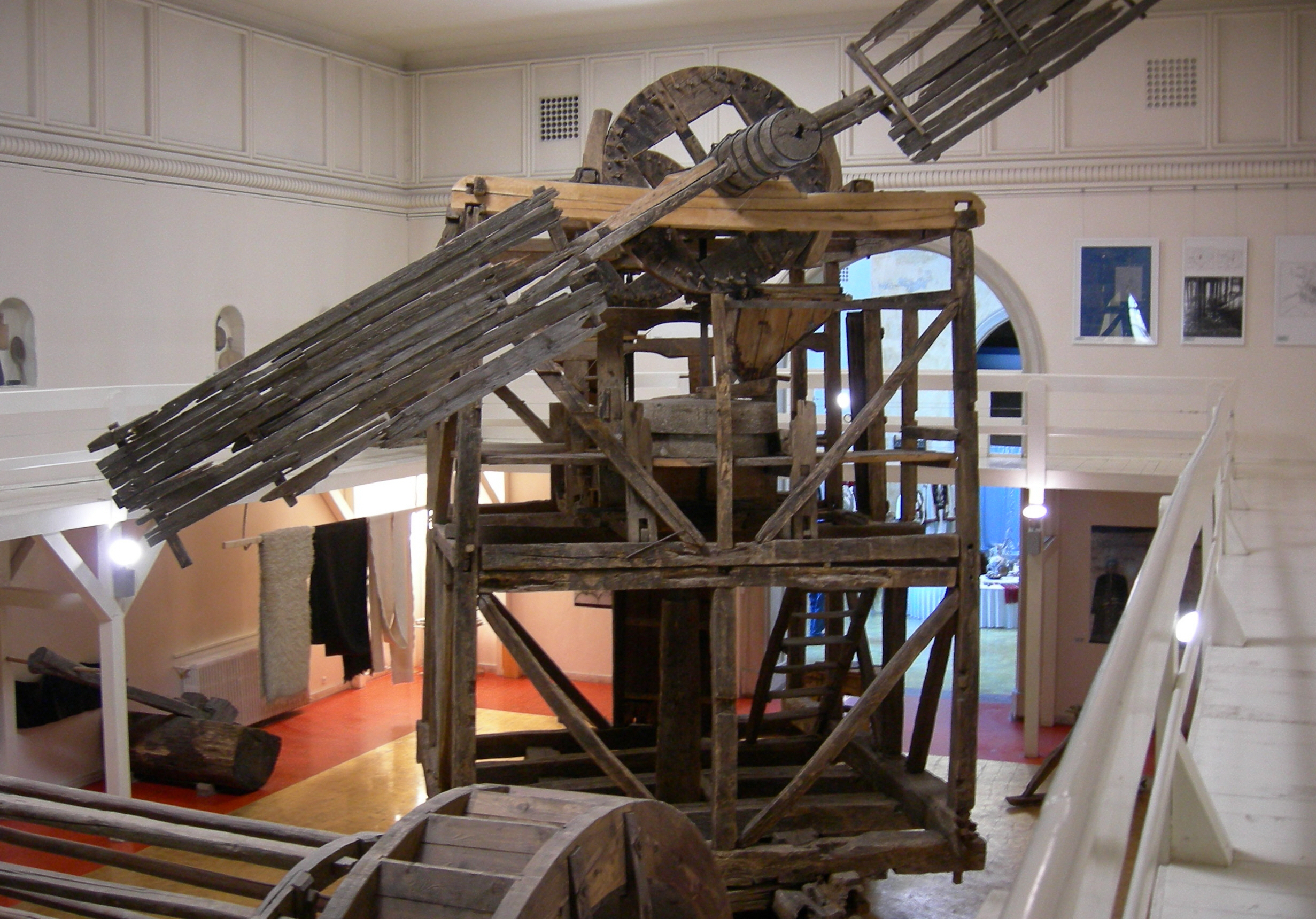

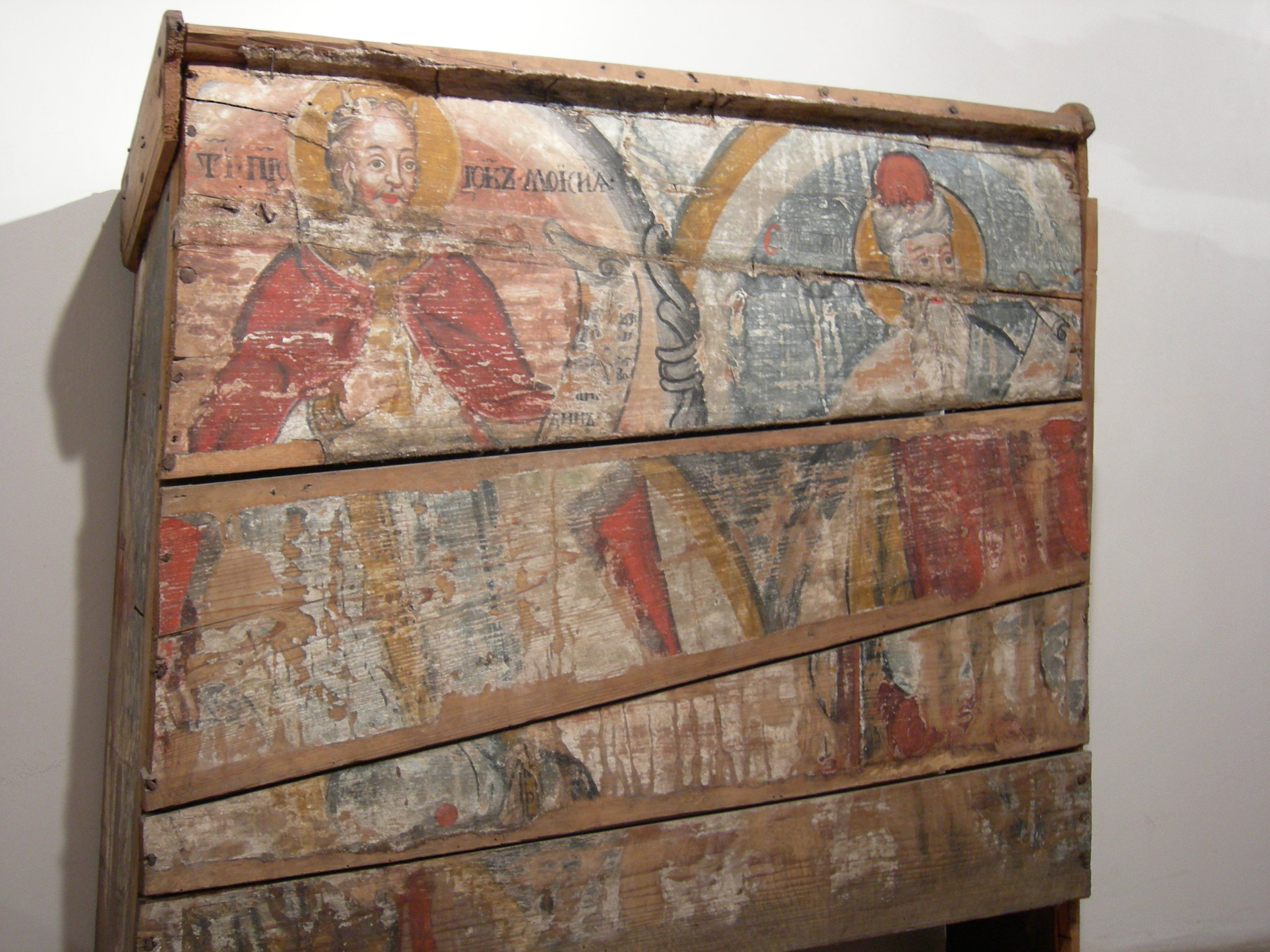
