= Ribița =

- Commune
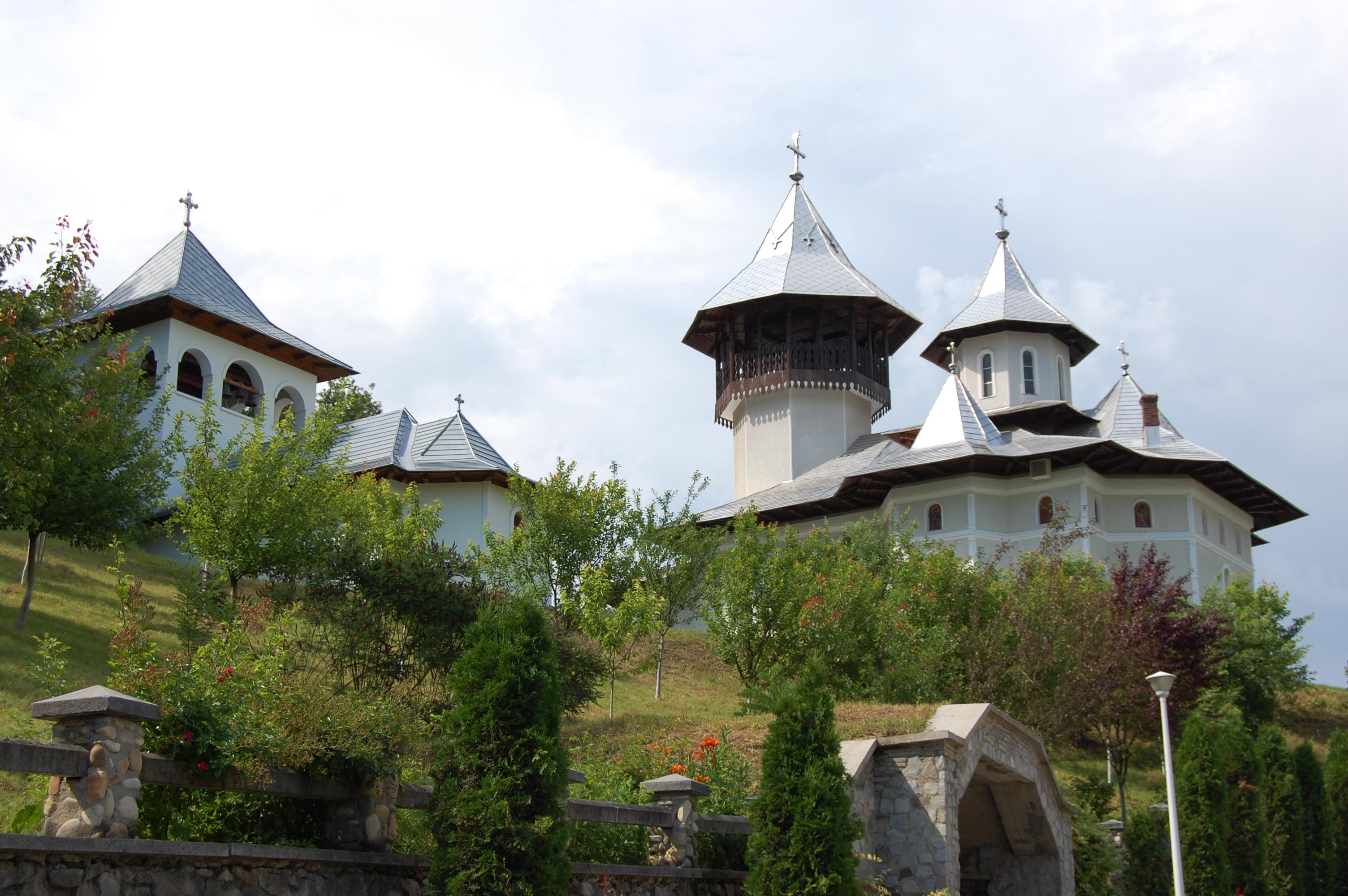
- Crișan Monastery

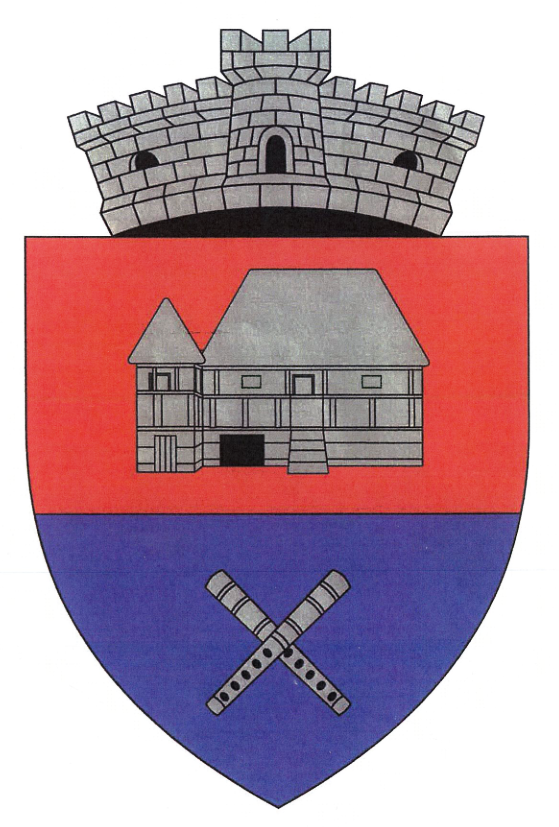
- Coat of arms

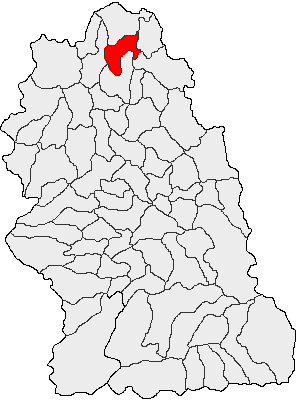
- Location in Hunedoara County

- Location in Romania
- Coordinates: 46°11′N 22°46′E
- Country: Romania
- County: Hunedoara

Government
  - Mayor (2024–2028): Virgil Nicolae Dobrin (PSD)
- Area: 73 km^{2} (28 sq mi)
- Elevation: 260 m (850 ft)
- Population (2021-12-01): 1,170
  - Density: 16/km^{2} (42/sq mi)
- Time zone: UTC+02:00 (EET)
  - Summer (DST): UTC+03:00 (EEST)
- Postal code: 337400
- Area code: (+40) 02 54
- Vehicle reg.: HD
- Website: ribita.ro

Ribița (Hungarian: Ribice, German: Kellerdorf) is a commune in Hunedoara County, Transylvania, Romania. It is composed of six villages: Crișan (formerly Vaca; Váka), Dumbrava de Jos (Alsózsunk), Dumbrava de Sus (Felsőzsunk), Ribicioara (Ribicsora), Ribița, and Uibărești (Újbáresd).

The commune is located in the northern part of Hunedoara County, 7 km (4.3 mi) from the city of Brad, Hunedoara and 45 km (28 mi) from the county seat, Deva. It lies on the banks of the river Ribița, which discharges into the Crișul Alb at the southern edge of the commune. To the north are the Bihor Mountains and to the south are the Metaliferi Mountains.

Just 3 km (2 mi) south of Ribița, on the other side of the Crișul Alb River, pass the European route E79 and the CFR main line 200, which runs from Brașov to Arad and on to the Hungarian border.

The Crișan Monastery, also known as Vaca Monastery, was built in the late 16th century, with support from Michael the Brave. Located in the eponymous village, the monastery fell into disuse in the late 18th century, but was rebuilt in 1992.

Historical population
Year	Pop.	±%
1850	3,171	—
1910	4,097	+29.2%
2002	1,596	−61.0%
2011	1,347	−15.6%
2021	1,170	−13.1%
Source: INS, Census data

== Natives ==
Crișan village is named after Gheorghe Crișan (1732–1785), one of the leaders of the Revolt of Horea, Cloșca and Crișan. His birthplace is now a memorial house; in front of the house is a bust of Crișan, produced by Marcel Olinescu.

Poet Vlaicu Bârna (1913–1999) was also born in Crișan village.
