= Vlaicu Bârna =

Austro-Hungarian-born Romanian poet

- Born: Vlaicu Victor Virgil Bârna; December 4, 1913; Crișan, Hunedoara County, Transylvania
- Died: March 11, 1999 (aged 85)
- Education: University of Bucharest
- Occupation: poet
- Parents: Ion Bârna (father); Maria (née Pavel) (mother)

Vlaicu Victor Virgil Bârna (December 4, 1913 – March 11, 1999) was an Austro-Hungarian-born Romanian poet.

== Biography ==
Born in Crișan, Hunedoara County, in the Transylvania region, his parents Ion Bârna and Maria (née Pavel) were peasants. After graduating from Avram Iancu High School in Brad in 1932, he entered the literature and philosophy faculty of the University of Bucharest, earning his degree in 1936.

He was editing secretary for Azi magazine and editor at Rampa and România (under Cezar Petrescu's direction in 1938–1939) and at the daily Ardealul. From 1941 to 1947, he was press representative at the Propaganda Ministry and the Foreign Ministry. Under the Communist regime, he was editor at Editura de Stat pentru Literatură și Artă (1949–1951), literary adviser at Radiodifuziunea română (1951–1966), editor at Viața Românească (1968–1974) and literary secretary of the Romanian Writers' Union (1972–1976). He edited and headed the publications Arta (1941; Arta nouă in 1942–1943) and Galeria (1941–1943). He was a participant in the Sburătorul circle, particularly from 1933 to 1935.

Bârna's first published poems appeared in Azi, Viața literară, and Litere in 1934; his first poetry book was the 1936 Cabane albe. His work appeared in Revista Fundațiilor Regale, Familia, Universul literar, Gazeta literară, România Literară, and Steaua. In 1944, during World War II, he edited the bimonthly Câmpia Libertății, a publication that protested against fascism and the Second Vienna Award. Starting with Brume (1940) and through the retrospective selection Cupa de aur (1970) and Patria mea, plai al Mioriței (1977), he sought to evoke a medieval Transylvania dominated by mountain landscapes and the turbulent history of the moți. Under communism, in the socialist realist framework, he also celebrated the new societal conditions. He wrote two historical novels for young people: Romanul Caterinei Varga (1961) and Când era Horia împărat (1962). Authors he translated include Adam Mickiewicz, Heinrich Heine, and Victor Hugo.

He won the Ion Pavelescu Prize for sonnets in 1934 and the Romanian Academy's Mihai Eminescu Prize in 1977. In 1996 he was made honorary citizen of Brad; a memorial for Bârna is located in his native village, Crișan.
