= Horace Lecoq de Boisbaudran =

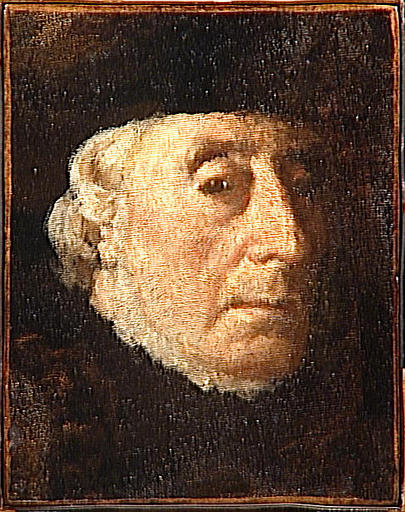
Horace Lecoq de Boisbaudran

Horace Lecoq de Boisbaudran (French pronunciation: [ɔʁas ləkɔk də bwabodʁɑ̃]; May 14, 1802 – August 7, 1897) was a French artist and teacher.

He was born in Paris. Boisbaudran was admitted in 1819 to the École des Beaux-Arts where he studied under Peyron and Guillon Lethière. He exhibited at the Salon in 1831 and 1840, and became a professor at the academy.

As a drawing instructor he became known for his innovative method which emphasized memorization. His students were instructed to visit the Louvre, where they were to carefully study a painting in order to reproduce it from memory later, in the studio. This exercise was intended to help the student to discover his own visual language.

Among Lecoq de Boisbaudran's best-known students were Rodin, Fantin-Latour, and Alphonse Legros. Others who studied with him include Jules Chéret, Léon Lhermitte, Jean-Charles Cazin, Jules Dalou and Oscar Roty. Lecoq de Boisbaudran died in Paris on August 7, 1897.

== Books by Lecoq de Boisbaudran ==
- Éducation de la mémoire pittoresque, Paris, 1848.
- Éducation de la mémoire pittoresque, application aux arts du dessin, 2e éd. augmentée, Paris, Bance, 1862.
- Lettres à un jeune professeur, Paris, Morel, 1876.
- Un Coup d'œil à l'enseignement aux Beaux-Arts, Paris, Morel, 1879.
- L'Éducation de la mémoire pittoresque et la formation de l'artiste, publié par Lowes Dalbiac Luard, Paris, Laurens, 1920 (compilation of the preceding titles).
- The Training of the Memory in Art, and the Education of the Artist (English translation of preceding titles, London, Macmillan, 1911)
