= Bulzeștii de Sus =

- Commune
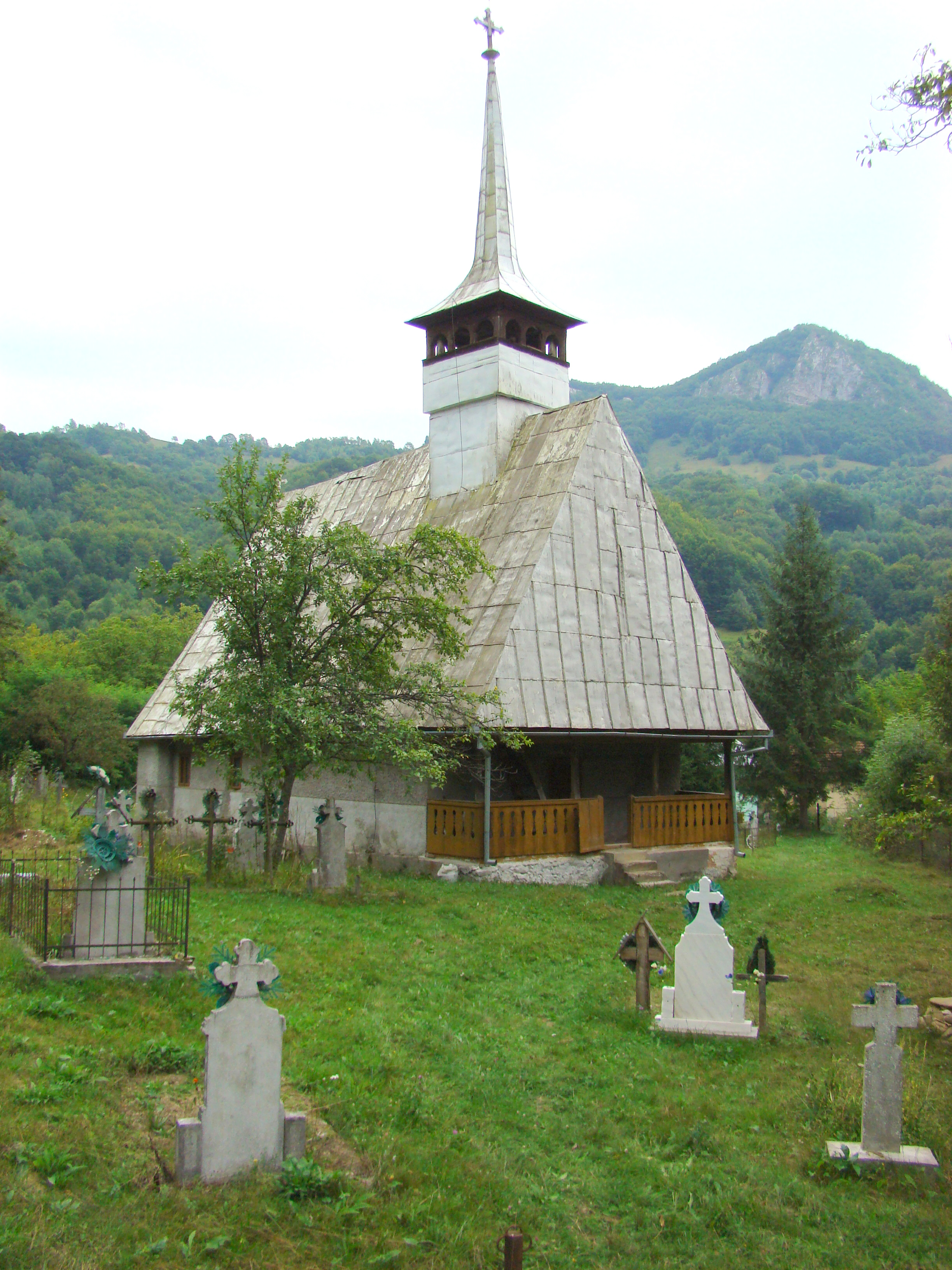
- Wooden church in Bulzeștii de Sus

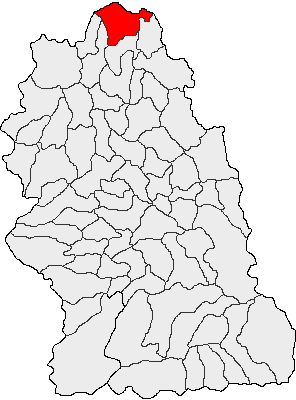
- Location in Hunedoara County

- Location in Romania
- Coordinates: 46°18′N 22°46′E
- Country: Romania
- County: Hunedoara

Government
  - Mayor (2020–2024): Mirel-Ion Suba (PSD)
- Area: 110.04 km^{2} (42.49 sq mi)
- Elevation: 500 m (1,600 ft)
- Population (2021-12-01): 275
  - Density: 2.50/km^{2} (6.47/sq mi)
- Time zone: UTC+02:00 (EET)
  - Summer (DST): UTC+03:00 (EEST)
- Postal code: 337150
- Area code: (+40) 0254
- Vehicle reg.: HD
- Website: primariabulzestiidesus.ro

Bulzeștii de Sus (Hungarian: Felsőbulzesd) is a commune in Hunedoara County, Transylvania, Romania. It is composed of nine villages: Bulzeștii de Sus, Bulzeștii de Jos (Alsóbulzesd), Giurgești, Grohot (Grohot), Păulești, Rusești, Stănculești, Ticera, and Tomnatec (Tomnatek).

The commune is located in the northern extremity of Hunedoara County, 29 km (18 mi) from Brad and 67 km (42 mi) from the county seat, Deva, on the border with Arad and Alba counties.

Historical population
Year	Pop.	±%
1850	3,195	—
1900	4,250	+33.0%
2002	406	−90.4%
2011	271	−33.3%
2021	275	+1.5%
Source: Census data

== Ticera ==
Ticera is an abandoned village in the Bulzeștii de Sus commune. The village is currently uninhabited after it has been abandoned by its residents. It was one of the richest villages in the Apuseni Mountains. The destruction of the church by lightning, estimated to have happened around 1970, led the residents to leave the village. A road to the village is currently under construction and other than that the village is only reachable by foot through not well-kept footpaths.
