= Kir Ianulea =

- Short story by Ion Luca Caragiale
- Cover of a 1969 standalone edition of the story, published by Editura Tineretului
- Language: Romanian
- Genres: fantasy, historical fiction, satire

Publication
- Published in: Viața Românească
- Publication type: periodical
- Publication date: 1909
- Publication place: Romania
- Media type: print

Kir Ianulea or Kyr Ianulea (Romanian pronunciation: [kir jaˈnule̯a]) is a fantasy and historical fiction novella or short story, published by Romanian author Ion Luca Caragiale in 1909. Borrowing the elements of a fairy tale, satire and frame story, it has become recognized as one of Caragiale's leading contributions to short prose, and is often described as one of the seminal works written by him during the last decade of his life. While its narrative structure is largely based on Belfagor arcidiavolo, a story by 16th century writer and political thinker Niccolò Machiavelli, Kir Ianulea employs additional elements such as anecdotes to evolve into a social fresco of late 18th-century Wallachia and the Ottoman-ruled Balkans as a whole. Caragiale primarily adapts Machiavelli's theme, which is a fable about the innate unreliability of women, to the realities of the Phanariote epoch, focusing his attention on the interactions between Greeks and Romanians while offering additional insight into the process of acculturation.

Structured around its protagonist and named after his main alias, Kir Ianulea recounts how one of the lesser devils is assigned the mission of assessing the evil and negativity of women. In order to accomplish this task, he must live the life of a mortal, and chooses Bucharest as his city of residence. The main part of the story recounts his unhappy marriage to the tyrannical and dishonest Acrivița, his realization that his future among humans was compromised, and his narrow escape from his creditors. The third part shows the devil possessing aristocratic young women as part of a scheme to reward his one-human benefactor, the peasant Negoiță. The narrative ends with a fall-out between Negoiță and Ianulea, and the latter's hasty return to Hell upon being threatened by a potential reunion with Acrivița.

Caragiale's tale has been the target of critical interest since its publication, being discussed for its relation to Machiavelli's original story, its particular Neoromantic aesthetics and picturesque elements, its ambivalent take on feminism, as well as the various allusions to concrete social realities. Among the latter are its original insight into the urban culture of Romania in the pre-Westernization period, the recovery of Greek or Turkish influences on the Romanian lexis, and the possible intention on Caragiale's part to depict Ianulea as his alter ego. The story has had its own sizable impact on local literature and the culture of Romania, notably serving to inspire writers such as Radu Cosașu and Radu Macrinici, and being turned into a 1939 operetta by composer Sabin Drăgoi.

== Plot ==
=== Introductory episodes ===
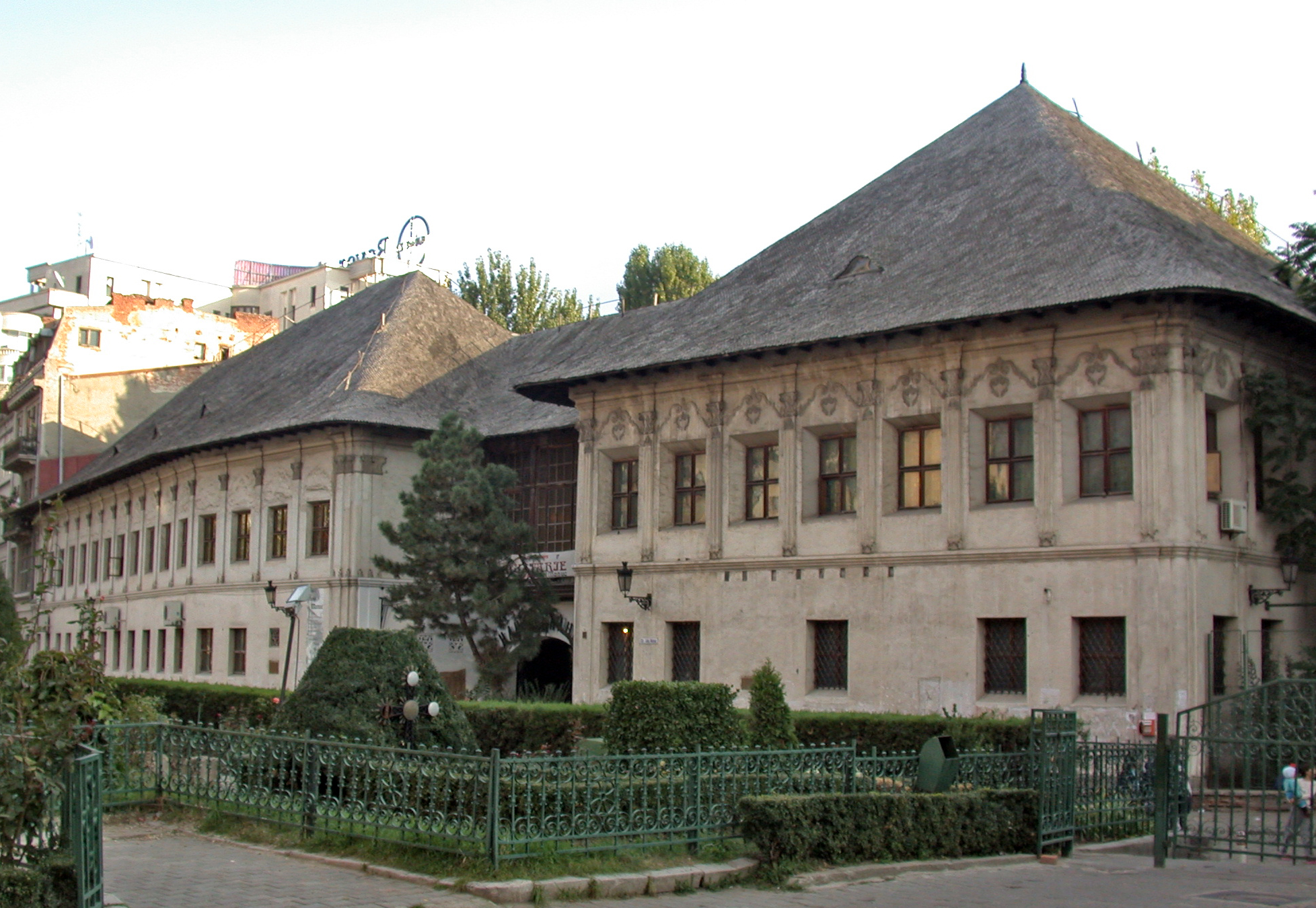
Side view of Manuc's Inn

The narrative opens with the rally of all devils, as ordered by "the Overlord of Hell" Dardarot. Probably a replica version of Astaroth, the latter confesses being intrigued by the large number of human victims who claim to have sinned only because of women, and indicates that he considers a method for verifying the truth in this claim. Dardarot decides to send "the little one", Aghiuță ("Hell's Bells" or "Dickens"), into an extended investigation on Earth. Although received with displays of fatherly affection by Dardarot, the boy is reluctant to perform such tasks, since, as the narrator informs, he is not on his first mission among humans: previously, he had served an old woman, and forced by her to expend his energy on the futile task of straightening a curly hair. Unimpressed, Dardarot provides him with 100,000 gold coins (the bounty confiscated from a stingy mortal), with the indication that he is to marry and live with his human wife for ten years. Transformed into a handsome young mortal and evicted from Hell by his moody overlord, Aghiuță decides to head for Bucharest, a city with "room for parties" and many business opportunities. He arrives in the Wallachian capital and books a room at Manuc's Inn, before renting a cluster of townhouses and gardens in Negustori area (the merchants' district, close to Colțea Hospital).

The new guest intrigues Aghiuță's new landlord, who sends the old and cunning housekeeper Marghioala to engage him in conversation and find out his story. Recommending himself as Ianulea "of Arvanite stock", the young man explains that he is from near Mount Athos (Sfântagora), in Ottoman Greece, the son of olive tree planters. He provides an elaborate story about his early years, claiming that both his parents died at sea, while taking him on pilgrimage to the Holy Sepulchre in Jerusalem—victims of bowel obstruction caused by eating beans after radishes. He recounts having been kept on as a servant and boy seaman by the brutal captain of the ship, and having survived a number of near shipwrecks, and then purchasing his own vessel. After further such adventures, Aghiuță-Ianulea claims, he had been able to amass a fortune and settle in a peaceful country. He also boasts knowledge of several languages without access to formal studies, and claims that his knowledge of Romanian will put Wallachian locals to shame. In the end, Ianulea threatens Marghioala not to share his secret with anyone else, aware that such a warning will only entice her to spread the story around the neighborhood.

=== Ianulea's marriage ===
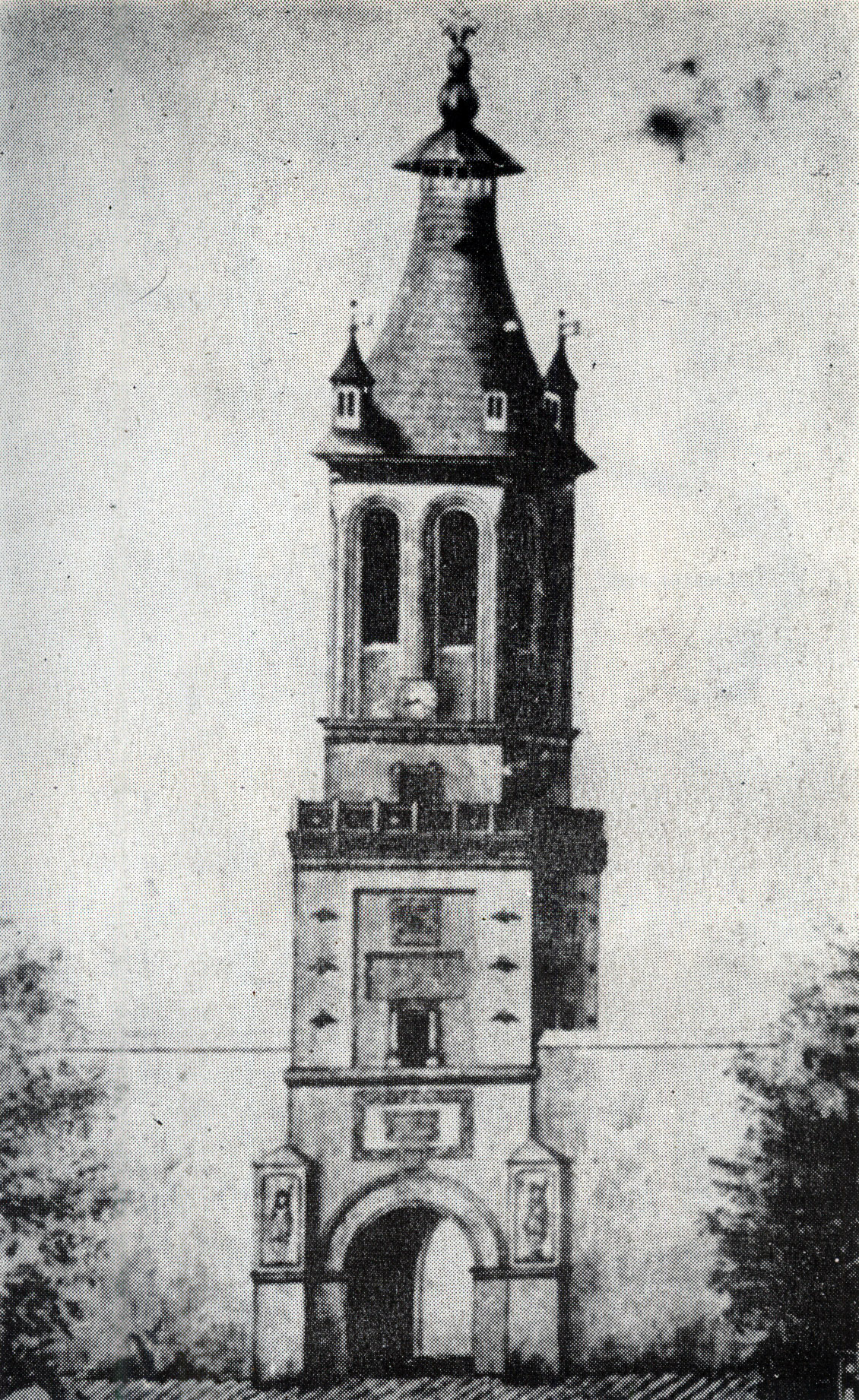
The Colțea Belfry in 1802

Rumor spreads of Ianulea's fortune and the young man, referred to as a kir ("sir", from the Greek κύρ), becomes the center of interest in high society, being invited to events organized by boyars and merchants alike. The details of his account become well-known, his deeds magnified by popular imagination, and, as a consequence, the entire neighborhood is convinced that beans should never be eaten after radishes. Meanwhile, Ianulea begins courting Acrivița, the daughter of unsuccessful trader Hagi Cănuță, who is beautiful and well-proportioned, but has mild esotropia. Although she can offer him no dowry, he decides to marry her, and their wedding is an occasion for Ianulea to display his insatiable taste for luxury. The day after their union, Acrivița (also referred to as Ianuloaia, "Ianulea's woman") undergoes a sudden change in character from "gentle and amendable" to "tougher and uppity", entitling herself master of the household and exercising control over her husband's affairs. She is also increasingly jealous, constantly spying on her husband and ordering her servants to do the same, but does not feel accountable for her own actions. She therefore hosts lavish parties and card game sessions in her husband's house, and irritates him by defaming her own friends. During one such gathering, she informs her guests that a female acquaintance of hers has been fornicating with one of the Wallachian Prince's sons, with a consul of the Russian Empire, and even, after being banished to Căldărușani Monastery, with an Orthodox monk. Acrivița also claims that the unnamed friend plots to "break" her household by committing adultery with Ianulea. This enrages Ianulea, and the couple begin shouting abuse at each other, while their stunned guests look on.

The Ianuleas eventually reconcile and the kir is placated, addressing his wife as parigboria tu kosmu (παρηγοριά του κόσμου, "consolation of the world"). Unbeknown to him, Acrivița has by then begun selling various objects of value in his property to feed her gambling habit. Tricking Ianulea with displays of her affection, she also persuades him to provide a dowry for her two unmarried sisters, as well as capital for her two brothers' respective businesses. Ianulea proceeds to service this and other whims ("had she asked for the Colțea Belfry on a silver platter, kir Ianulea would have brought it to her on a silver platter"). As a result, Ianule's fortune is steadily depleted, and he comes to rely on expected proceeds from his investment in the business of his brothers-in-law, while steadily falling into debt. While his credit rating crumbles, Acrivița's itinerant siblings return with bad news: one has lost his ship in front of İzmir, the other has been robbed at the Leipzig Trade Fair.

Ianulea's only option is to flee Bucharest in a haste and escape his creditors. As he rides past Cuțitul de Argint Church, he notices that he is being pursued by armed guards, sent by the Bucharest Aga to lock him into a debtors' prison. He abandons his horse and runs up a hill and into a vineyard, pleading with the keeper to provide him with shelter. The latter, who presents himself as Negoiță, reluctantly accepts to do so when Ianulea assures him that his pursuers are not boyars. In exchange for his help, Ianulea lets him on his secret identity, and promises to reward him. He explains: "Whenever you hear that the devil's got into a woman, a wife, or a girl, whatever, no matter the place where they live and no matter what station in life they have, you should know it's about me that they're talking. You go right away to the respective house for I won't leave the woman until you chase me out... Naturally that seeing you cure their precious jewel they will offer you a reward".

=== Negoiță's fortune ===
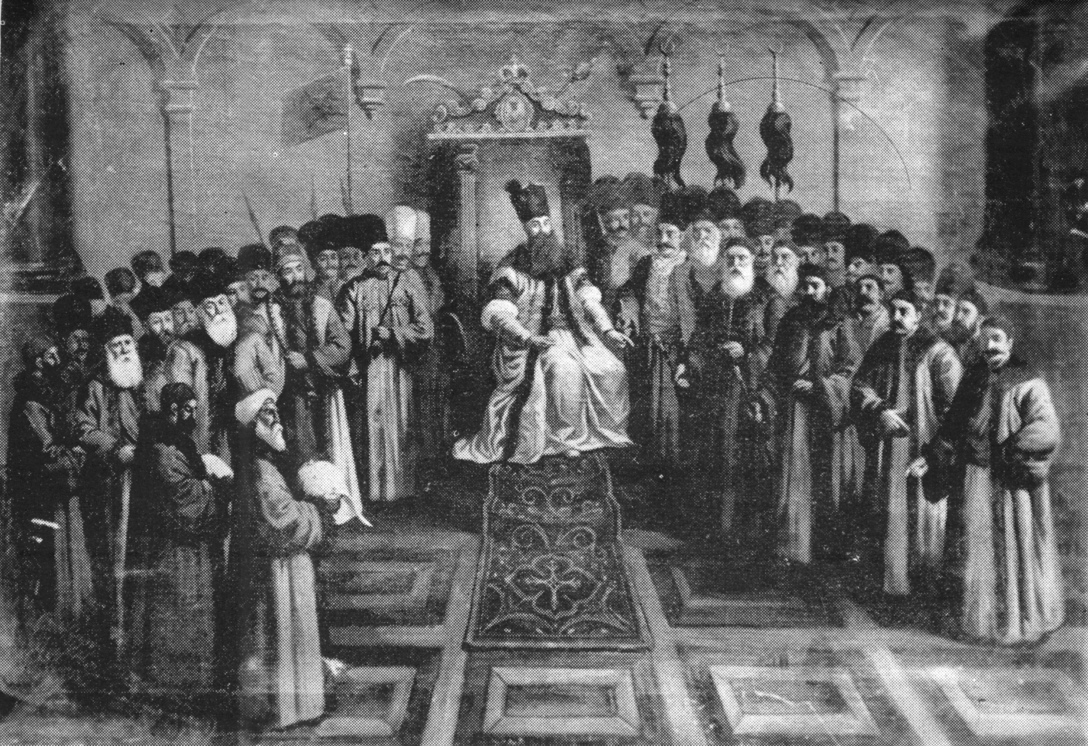
The Phanariote court of Wallachia: Prince Nicholas Mavrogenes and his boyars

The devil leaves the vineyard, and the focus moves on Negoiță. Catching rumor of a demonic possession in Colentina neighborhood, where a rich girl has come to speak in tongues, shouting and divulging all sorts of embarrassing secrets. The vineyard keeper promises to relieve her suffering in exchange for 100 gold coins, and Ianulea subsequently fulfills his promise. He scolds Negoiță for accepting such a small amount, and informs that he should make his way for Craiova, where they are going to repeat their act with the daughter of a local administrator, the kaymakam. This happens exactly as predicted by the devil, who, upon exiting the girl's body, informs the peasant that he no longer considers himself indebted.

As thanks for his service, Negoiță is granted an Oltenian estate and assigned a boyar's title. His blissful relaxation is interrupted abruptly when the kaymakam orders him on mission to Bucharest, where the Phanariote prince's daughter is also being tormented by a demon. Although much troubled, the healer follows princely envoys, and is warmly greeted by the prince (who casually addresses him in Greek, unaware that Negoiță is in reality a local peasant). Nevertheless, the princess strongly rejects the healer's presence, and asks instead for "my old man", a certain Captain Manoli Ghaiduri. The soldier is immediately sent for, and reveals himself to be the girl's secret love interest, a "splendid" Greek from the princely guard. While the princess persistently asks Manoli to mangle the intruding healer, the latter thinks of a ruse: suggesting that the girl's illness needs specialized help, he asks permission to consult with Acrivița Ianulea, "the widow of the wretch", whom he recommends as a better doctor than he. His demand has an instant effect on the princess: instead of shrieking and shouting, she begins cluttering her teeth. Within three days, she is spontaneously relieved of her symptoms.

Negoiță does however proceed to Negustori, learning that Acrivița was chased out of her home by the creditors and moved back in with her father. Once there, he claims to be a debtor of Ianulea's, presenting her with 100 gold coins and a deed to the Cuțitul de Argint vineyard. He manages to intrigue her by suggesting that, should she ever hear of a demon possessing a woman or girl, she is to walk up to the victim, call out parigboria tu kosmu, and recount her longing for Ianulea. She promises to follow his advice, and Negoiță returns to court, before deciding to head out of the city for good. He receives yet more presents from the princely family, as well as emotional thanks from Manoli Ghaiduri. As Negoiță rides out on his way to Oltenia, the devil takes control of another young lady, the daughter of Wallachia's Orthodox Metropolitan. This is Acrivița's opportunity to follow Negoiță's advice, and, as soon as she enters the room, the demon flees in panic. The story ends on Aghiuță's return to Hell, where he requests from Dardarot not to ever accept either Negoiță and Acrivița into Hell, and assign them instead to Heaven: "let Saint Peter make up with them as best he can." He also demands and obtains a period of rest to last three centuries, as "those little affairs down on earth left me dog-tired."

== Style, themes and symbolism ==
=== Context ===
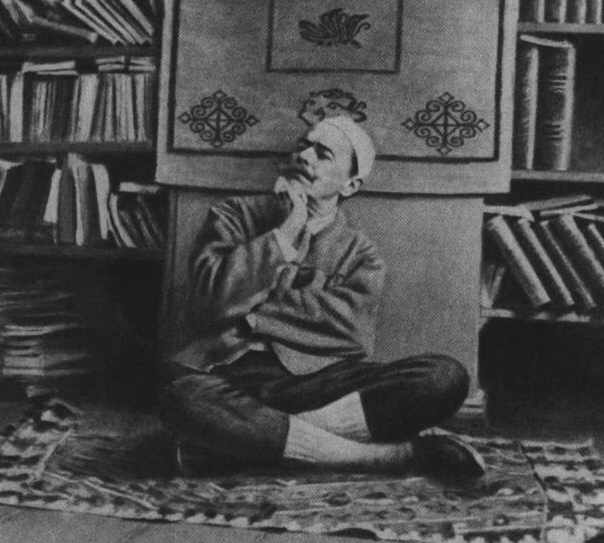
Photograph of Caragiale in Balkan costume (ca. 1900)

Kir Ianulea belongs to the final period in Caragiale's career, during which he was mainly focusing on writing fantasy, moving away from stricter Realism and displaying more interest in the techniques of classical storytelling. The retired playwright, who lived in voluntary exile to the German Empire between 1905 and his 1912 death, dedicated his final literary contributions to short prose (from novellas to sketch stories), and, according to literary critic Șerban Cioculescu, produced with Kir Ianulea "his most significant literary production of that period". Caragiale is thought by comparatist Mariana Cap-Bun to have grown aware of his own international recognition by 1900-1910: this revelation, Cap-Bun argues, is what prompted him to diversify his approach and seek to contribute works with a universal appeal, primarily by reworking old narrative themes. In his 1941 synthesis of literary history, influential critic George Călinescu also identified Caragiale's maturity with a growing interest in the Balkans and the Levant in general, and in particular with producing "artistic Balkanism" on the basis of picturesque motifs. According to researcher Tatiana-Ana Fluieraru, the change also constituted a radical break with the modern themes of Caragiale's consecrated works, since, as opposed to his traditionalist counterparts, "nothing seemed to recommend Ion Luca Caragiale for the rendition of popular stories and anecdotes." She also notes that, in respect to his thematic choices, the writer remained "quite cosmopolitan", Kir Ianulea being among eight of his last thirty-two stories to choose Levantine subjects over Romanian folkloric sources. Caragiale himself was very pleased with the results of his activity, and called the resulting tales his best works ever.

According to literary historian Tudor Vianu, the interval was primarily marked by a Neoromantic and Neoclassical interest in Renaissance and Elizabethan writings, making Caragiale a direct descendant of frame story authors and a disciple of William Shakespeare. In his assessment, Kir Ianulea shares such traits with other Schițe noi tales, primarily Pastramă trufanda and Calul dracului (the latter of which he believes to be "one of the most perfect stories written in the Romanian language"). Such writings drew critical attention for subtly merging the supernatural elements into a realistic whole. Calling attention to this special trait, Călinescu likened Kir Ianulea to Stan Pățitul, a prose piece by his contemporary Ion Creangă, which similarly recounts how the Devil finds refuge in a modern, albeit rural, setting. Writing a decade after Călinescu, philologist Ștefan Cazimir proposed that there is an "evolutionary thread" going from the fantasy stories by Costache Negruzzi (ca. 1840), through Kir Ianulea, and to the dark prose of Gala Galaction (ca. 1920).

Another literary historian, George Bădărău, argued that Kir Ianulea stands alongside two other Schițe noi sections (Calul dracului and the Arabian Nights-inspired Abu-Hasan), and together with Ion Minulescu's 1930 volume Cetiți-le noaptea ("Read Them at Night"), as a sample of Romanian literature where "the fantasy realm enters human reality [...], being less exploited as a vision, and more as an oddity." Writing in 2002, researcher Gabriela Chiciudean proposed that Kir Ianulea inaugurated "a new territory" in Caragiale's work, where the fantasy element was being "reduced to the dimensions of the human." According to novelist and theater critic Mircea Ghițulescu, the story joins up with some other samples of Caragiale's short prose (Pastramă trufanda, but also La hanul lui Mânjoală and O făclie de Paște) in anticipating the "magic realism" of the 1960s Latin American Boom.

Reportedly drafted in three days, the tale is believed to have taken some three weeks to perfect. On January 12, 1909, Caragiale wrote to his friend and biographer Paul Zarifopol that Kir Ianulea was completed, jokingly adding: "With God's help, I have finally finished off the devil!" The story was soon after published in the Iași-based magazine Viața Românească. In 1910, it was ultimately included in Caragiale's last anthumous prose collection, Schițe noi ("New Sketches").

=== Kir Ianulea and Belfagor arcidiavolo ===
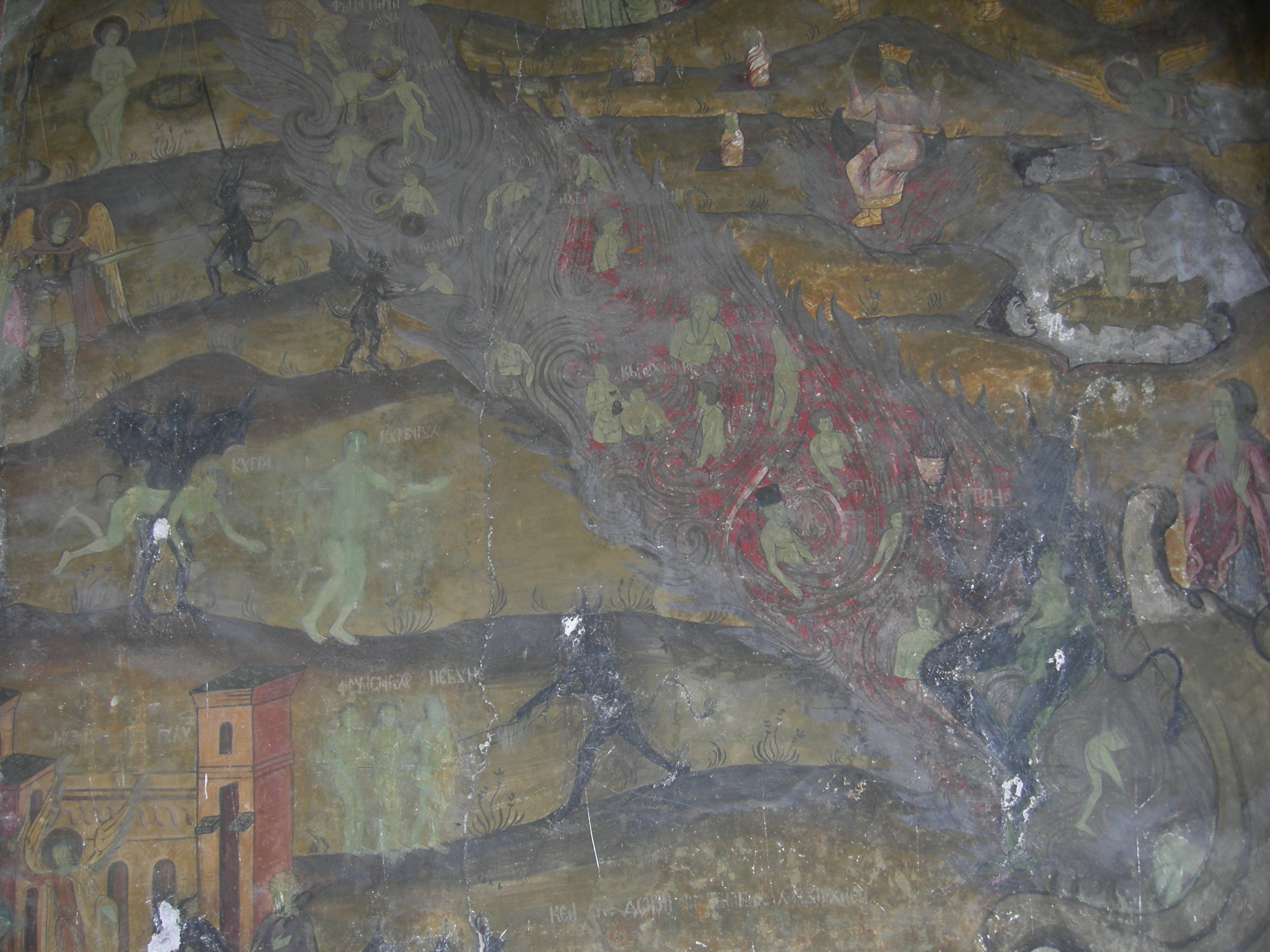
Depiction of Hell in an 18th-century Romanian Orthodox mural (Sfântul Elefterie Vechi, Bucharest)

The central theme in Caragiale's story is directly borrowed from Western European Renaissance stories which have the devilish creature Belphegor as their protagonist. A better known Italian-language incarnation of the theme is Niccolò Machiavelli's Belfagor arcidiavolo, published in his 1549 collected works. Machiavelli's text was however preceded by a shorter version, signed Giovanni Brevio and first printed 1545 as Novella di Belfagorx. In the 19th century, Scottish academic John Colin Dunlop claimed that these writings were all based on a since-lost Renaissance Latin version. A separate French-language version was published before in the 17th century, as part of Jean de La Fontaine's Contes. Although the story had already been circulating in a Romanian variant (printed in Moldavia), Caragiale's version was primarily based on a French translation from Machiavelli: Nouvelle très plaisante de l'archidiable Belphégor ("A Very Enjoyable Novella about the Archdevil Belphegor"). However, he also checked other variants, and informed himself about a German-language translation.

The Romanian writer was by then an outspoken admirer of the Renaissance thinker, and his various records mention Machiavelli with words of high praise. According to literary historian Constantin Trandafir, the only other person for whom "Caragiale reserved as many superlatives" is Mihai Eminescu, Romania's national poet and his personal friend. Like with several other of his Schițe noi, Caragiale mentioned and credited his predecessor, first in his correspondence about the unfinished text, and ultimately within the footnotes of the published version. In one of his messages to Zarifopol, he invited his younger friend to review both texts and see "if I have been doing [Machiavelli] justice with the story of my Kir Ianulea." However, he also made a point of claiming that the Belfagor story no longer belonged to its creator: "since always, the stories belong to everybody, but the manner of recounting them belongs, no matter what the age, to the raconteur".

A number of significant thematic and stylistic differences exist between the 1549 story and the 1909 Romanian version, which is almost four times as large as Machiavelli's; as noted early on by scholar Mihail Dragomirescu, Caragiale's text grew as a "symbolic novel". Describing Kir Ianulea and the various other portions of Schițe noi as early samples of metafiction, Cap-Bun noted: "the new filters were so efficient that one can hardly recognize the new grains growing from the sedimentary beds of the source culture to be responses to the primary texts." Machiavelli's original mixes characters in Ancient Greek myths (the presence of Pluto, Minos and Rhadamanthus) with Jewish and Christian mythology (the heresy of Peor), making Belphegor's mission relate to the supposed evils of womanhood and the morals of medieval Florence. In contrast to Belphegor, Caragiale's protagonist is feeble, shy, and, Șerban Cioculescu argues, a "sympathetic" figure. These differences were still deemed insufficient by Călinescu and by his contemporary, the influential modernist reviewer Eugen Lovinescu. The former judged Kir Ianulea a "larger version" of Machiavelli's account, while Lovinescu saw it as one of the pieces where Caragiale "brought only his storyteller's art, and nothing from his invention". Giovanni Rotiroti, an Italian critic and psychoanalyst, argues: "The Romanian novella does not move very far away from Machiavelli's, except in matters of lexical richness, as well as in scale and number of pages." Evidencing the thematic relationship and the tripartite structure of both stories, Rotiroti concludes: "The parallelism between the two novellas is perfect". He believes that Caragiale imagined a partial translation from Machiavelli, discarding those fragments he identified as weak, and turning the Florentine peculiarities into things that a modern Romanian audience could find alluring. Tatiana-Ana Fluieraru also proposes that Caragiale's story, unlike his other late pieces which reuse older themes, is an "actual reconstruction" of the source.

Caragial's localized adaptation takes place, according to Călinescu, during the rule of Prince Nicholas Mavrogenes (1786–1789), or, in Cioculescu's account: "toward the end of the 18th century and the beginning of the next, in still-Phanariote Bucharest, where one finds Manuc's Inn and the Negustori suburb". Italian literary historian and Romanist Gino Lupi finds that the Phanariote references touch every aspect of Caragiale's retelling, producing a fresco of historical Bucharest: "The episode, which is bare and concise in Belfagor, is shrouded here in particular details which serve to depict Phanariote Bucharest, with its roads, its means of transportation, its costumes. [...] Even if the good devil Kir Ianulea is the usual weak and enamored husband, Acrivița, the greedy and overbearing woman, and Negoiță, the shrewd peasant, are almost entirely for real." Tudor Vianu viewed Kir Ianulea as Caragiale's deepest exploration into his favorite object of derision: the Romanian middle class. This middle-class prehistory, Vianu notes, completes his earlier contributions to Romanian drama and comediography, his satire of social customs, and his ridicule of established political opinion. Vianu further noted that the story pinpoints the original middle-class acculturation: "the epoch of Greek penetration, when the bases for a large section of the local bourgeoisie were being laid down, creating a political reservoir". Writing later, critic Mihai Zamfir also found Kir Ianulea to be one of the first and few works of fiction to make "an object of aesthetic contemplation" out of the Phanariote age (second only to Nicolae Filimon's celebrated novel Upstarts Old and New).

=== Characteristic anecdotes and vocabulary ===
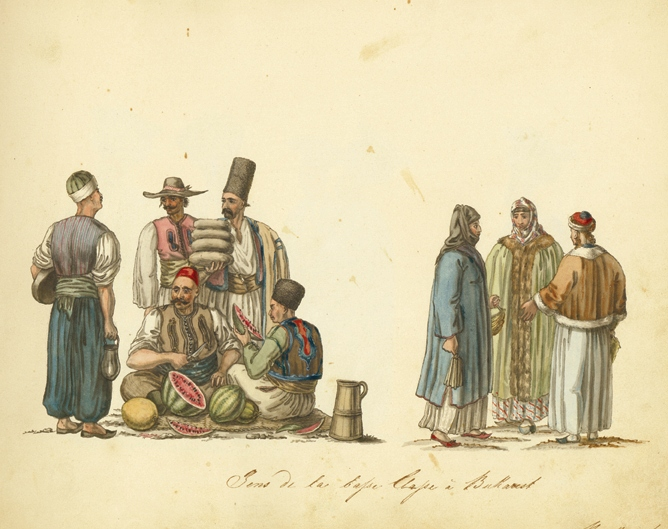
People from Bucharest, 1825

The newer version is also noted for its characteristic offshoots into anecdote, which contribute to the overall difference in size between the source and the replica version. The "pleasure of the anecdote" is identified by Cioculescu as the basis for Ianulea's detailed account about his origins, including the recipe for avoiding bowel obstruction (described by the critic as "an innocent devilish prank"). Cioculescu also notes: "Caragiale is clearly superior to Machiavelli as a storyteller; the thing responsible for this comfortable handicap is the illustrative power of dialogue, which allows characters to gain contour." Gabriela Chiciudean tracked resemblances between Kir Ianulea and the classical frame narratives of the Levant, working the pretext ("a subject fulfilling the orders of a king") into "labyrinthic paths".

A primary method used by Caragiale in rendering depth to his narrative is the recovery of antiquated Romanian lexis, with Phanariote-era archaisms of Turkish or Hellenic origin. In reference to these cultural references, Lupi wrote: "The language is rich in the Turkisms and Graecisms of the Phanariote age and greatly contributes in rendering local color to the narrative which [...] is true to historical reality." George Călinescu focused on the presence of such words throughout Kir Ianulea, proposing that they were used by the author as both a means of adding "color" and a method for illustrating "spiritual nuances", concluding: "The narrative revolves around hysterical episodes." Among the dated "violently southern" terms mentioned by Călinescu are capsoman ("stubborn man"), daraveră ("business"), ipochimen ("guy"), isnaf ("corporation"), levent ("gentlemanly"), proclet ("accursed"), matuf ("senile man"), mufluz ("bankrupt man"), selemet ("bankruptcy"), techer-mecher ("hurriedly"), zuliară ("jealous woman") and zumaricale ("sweets"). In order to add to the authenticity of his novella, Caragiale also contemplated inserting into it several fragments of poems by the late 18th-century author Costache Conachi.

Language and its uses plays a relevant part in the plot, providing additional clues and supporting elements. In Călinescu's opinion, Kir Ianulea differs from Caragiale's early works, where specialized or erroneous language is used for comedic effect; in this case, he argues, the Romanian author attempted not to ridicule his characters, but to reflect their background and origin. Kir Ianulea therefore records the origin of speech patterns which are natural for 18th-century boyars and traders, and which only become ridiculous at the other end of the Westernization process, where Caragiale's main plays reside: "This natural style [of speech] has later fallen through obsolescence into the immediately inferior class, as things will usually happen when the folk dress is concerned." This perspective prompted Călinescu to conclude that "Caragiale's genius" was in exposing and "rehabilitating" the earliest stage of a degenerative process, by reflecting the language of the mahala (a suburb or ghetto, commonly stereotyped as an uncivilized and unregulated community). However, he also criticized Caragiale's own belief that texts such as Kir Ianulea were stylistically accomplished because their Romanian was harmonious, believing that "spontaneity" and "naturalism" towered over "melody" throughout the narrative, reaching the point of "anti-artistic" literature.

The importance of various other linguistic elements within the narrative has also been highlighted by other researchers of Caragiale's work. An early observation made by Zarifopol, and cited by Cioculescu in agreement with his own arguments, has it that the author introduced references to himself and his Greek-Romanian origins in his portrayal of Aghiuță-Ianulea. This is thought to be the case for the character's stated pride that, despite being a foreigner (an Albanian, in Cioculescu's interpretation), he is both versed in Romanian culture and a polyglot. The notion that Ianulea is in effect Caragiale's alter ego has subsequently become commonplace among investigators of his work. According to Cioculescu: "This is, after all, the only place where the author reveals his entirely justified philological pride." Rotiroti theorizes the importance of words in defining the fairy tale's two "semantic fields". The original and concrete one is Hell, where "semantics are organized in pyramid fashion, and ordered [...] as signified of signifiers." He adds: "Even if the comedic effect [...] springs from an estranging, corporal, obscene, quasi-sexual effect, provided by the strange 'fatherly love'-based relationship between the little devil and his emperor, the body, or better said the various allusions to its components ('ear', 'tail') play a part that undermines with irony the structures attributable to this reality." Also according to Rotiroti, the hierarchy of significance is modified by the earthly episodes within the plot, particularly since Aghiuță's new identity is that of an outsider who holds a succession of roles, and since his foreign name is itself meant to suggest the strangeness of Phanariote times. The latter attribute, he believes, is illustrated and enhanced by the use of terms directly borrowed from other languages and regularly surfacing throughout the text.

=== Kir Ianulea and female empowerment ===
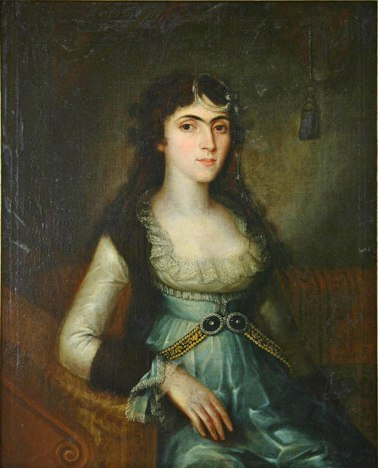
Maria, a boyaress of the Dudescu family. Painting by Mihail Töpler (ca. 1800)

Poet and folklorist Ioan Șerb, who included Caragiale's text in his Antologia basmului cult ("The Anthology of Cultured Fairy Tales"), placed it in direct comparison not just to Machiavelli's text, but also to an episode in the One Thousand and One Nights and an anecdote in Romanian folklore (collected by Ovidiu Bârlea in Hunedoara County). In Șerb's assessment, the main difference between such prose and Caragiale's text was the latter's "progressive tendency" and move toward "rehabilitating women". This perspective was received with reserve by Cioculescu: "kir Ianulea's wife, far from suggesting an intent for rehabilitation on Caragiale's part, illustrates the unbearable, exasperating character of a woman who is almost literally infernal. Only the fact that she does not resort to murder imposes the reserve of this 'almost'." In addition to her many psychological defects, Cioculescu argues, Caragiale hinted to Acrivița's innate negativity by mentioning her esotropia, exploiting the Romanian tradition according to which distinct marks on one's face are bad omens. Cioculescu wrote: "Actually, Caragiale builds his theme without misogynistic hatred, with the euphoria of the storyteller and the playwright who knows how to stage a situation for his characters [...]. But the lack of misogyny does not at all imply that the author, who so well depicts the circumstances of kir Ianulea's exasperation, is an advocate of women. [...] That Acrivița is 'fundamentally evil' is instantly apparent to any reader; that she is not a typical representative of all women is also very correctly assessed."

Mariana Cap-Bun ranks Acrivița's portrayal as "much more evil than the devil" alongside several "strong female characters" in Caragiale's stories and drama, arguing that this motif ultimately owed its inspiration to Shakespeare (and especially to Shakespearean tragedy, which is known to have been treasured by the Romanian author). She also finds that, as Caragiale's career drew to a close, this focus too modified to include the "excessively cruel and weird"—the unassailable meanness characterizing Ianuloaia being complemented by the murderous thoughts of Anca in the play Năpasta (1890) and by the violent bouts of hysteria displayed by Ileana, the incestuous protagonist of Păcat (1892).

== Legacy ==
Interpretations of Caragiale's story continued to be present in cultural debates of the interwar period and beyond. In 1932, Aromanian writer and cultural activist Nicolae Constantin Batzaria contributed an essay tracking down and assessing the Levantine narrative motifs retold by Kir Ianulea. The narrative's recovery of the foreign-influenced and often vilified past was viewed with reserve by 1930s nationalists such as philosopher and fantasy author Mircea Eliade, who found the story the most objectionable one among Caragiale's writings. In 1939, composer Sabin Drăgoi completed an operetta version of the story, which premiered at the Romanian Opera in Cluj (it was one of the last Romanian shows to be performed in the city before the Second Vienna Award granted Northern Transylvania to Hungary).

Kir Ianulea in particular has served to inspire a number of Caragiale's followers among modernist and postmodernist Romanian authors, with new elements being added after the 1989 Revolution. Declaring himself a disciple of Caragiale, writer and humorist Radu Cosașu referred to Kir Ianulea as "our father's most accomplished masterpiece". Also according to Cosașu, Kir Ianulea and Cănuță om sucit are two of Caragiale's most valuable stories in danger of being forgotten by readers, whereas his plays are being turned into "giant, intimidating clichés." In 2002, dramatist Radu Macrinici adapted Kir Ianulea into a new play. Titled Un prieten de când lumea? ("A Friend as Old as Time?"), the text merged an intertextual structure borrowed directly from the novella with elements from comedies by Caragiale's uncle Iorgu, as well as with Craii de Curtea-Veche, a celebrated novel by Caragiale's estranged son Mateiu. According to theater critic Gabriela Riegler, Macrinici used this mix to produce an artistic statement about modern depersonalization and "Romanian mediocrity". Un prieten de când lumea? was notably staged in 2002 by Sfântu Gheorghe's Andrei Mureșanu Theater, with Florin Vidamski as Ianulea.
