= Engaged column =

Column partly projecting from the surface of a wall

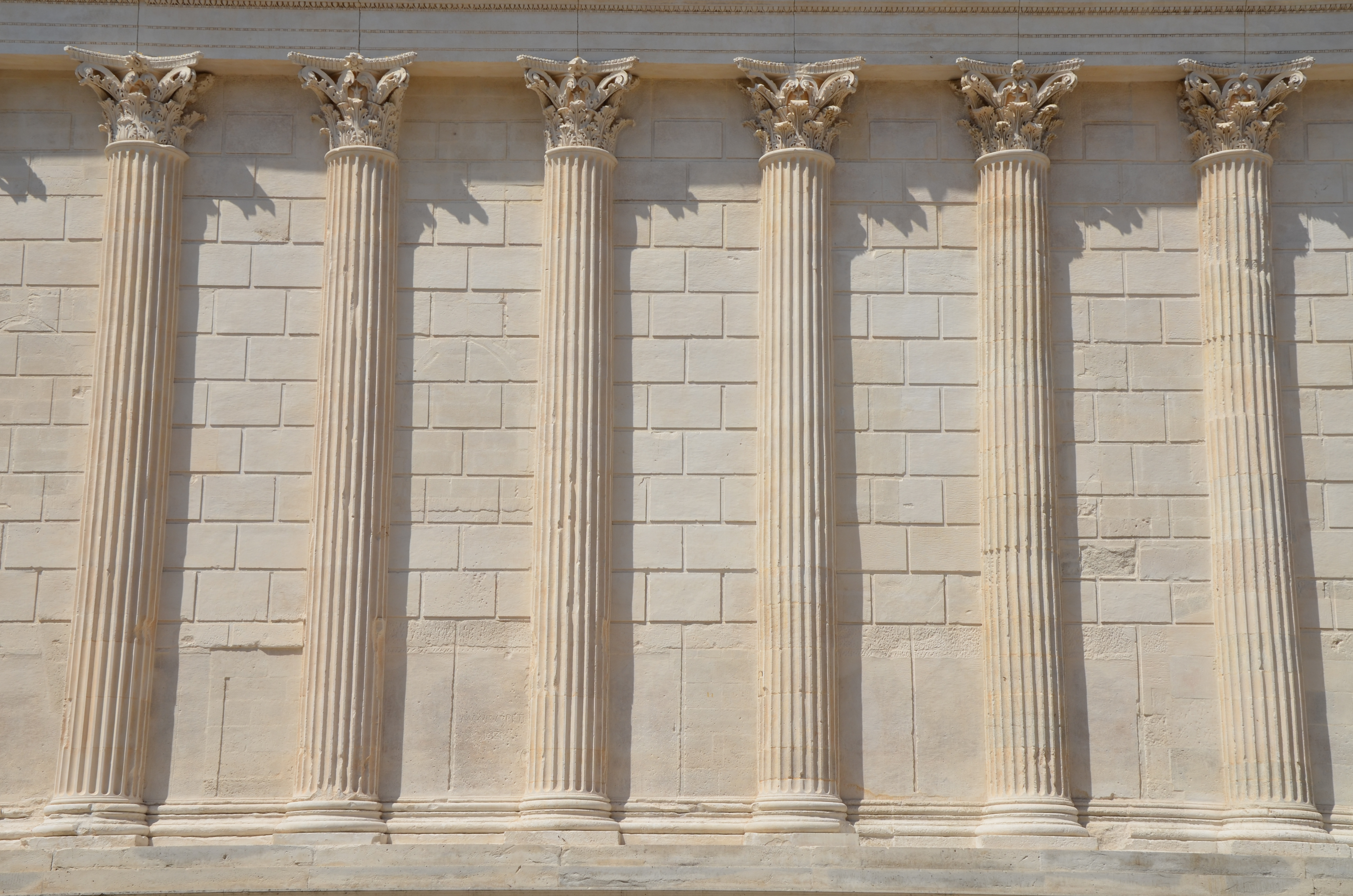
Engaged columns embedded in a side wall of the cella of the Maison Carrée, Nîmes, France, unknown architect, 2nd century

An engaged column is an architectural element in which a column is embedded in a wall and partly projecting from the surface of the wall, which may or may not carry a partial structural load. Sometimes defined as semi- or three-quarter detached, engaged columns are rarely found in classical Greek architecture, and then only in exceptional cases, but in Roman architecture they exist in abundance, most commonly embedded in the cella walls of pseudoperipteral Roman temples and other buildings.

In the temples, it is attached to the cella walls, repeating the columns of the peristyle, and in the theatres and amphitheatres, where they subdivided the arched openings: in all these cases engaged columns are utilized as a decorative feature, and as a rule the same proportions are maintained as if they had been isolated columns. In Romanesque work, the classic proportions were no longer adhered to; the engaged column, attached to the piers, has always a special function to perform, either to support subsidiary arches, or, raised to the vault, to carry its transverse or diagonal ribs. The same constructional object is followed in the earlier Gothic styles, in which they become merged into the mouldings. Being virtually always ready made, so far as their design is concerned, they were much affected by the Italian revivalists.

== Gallery ==
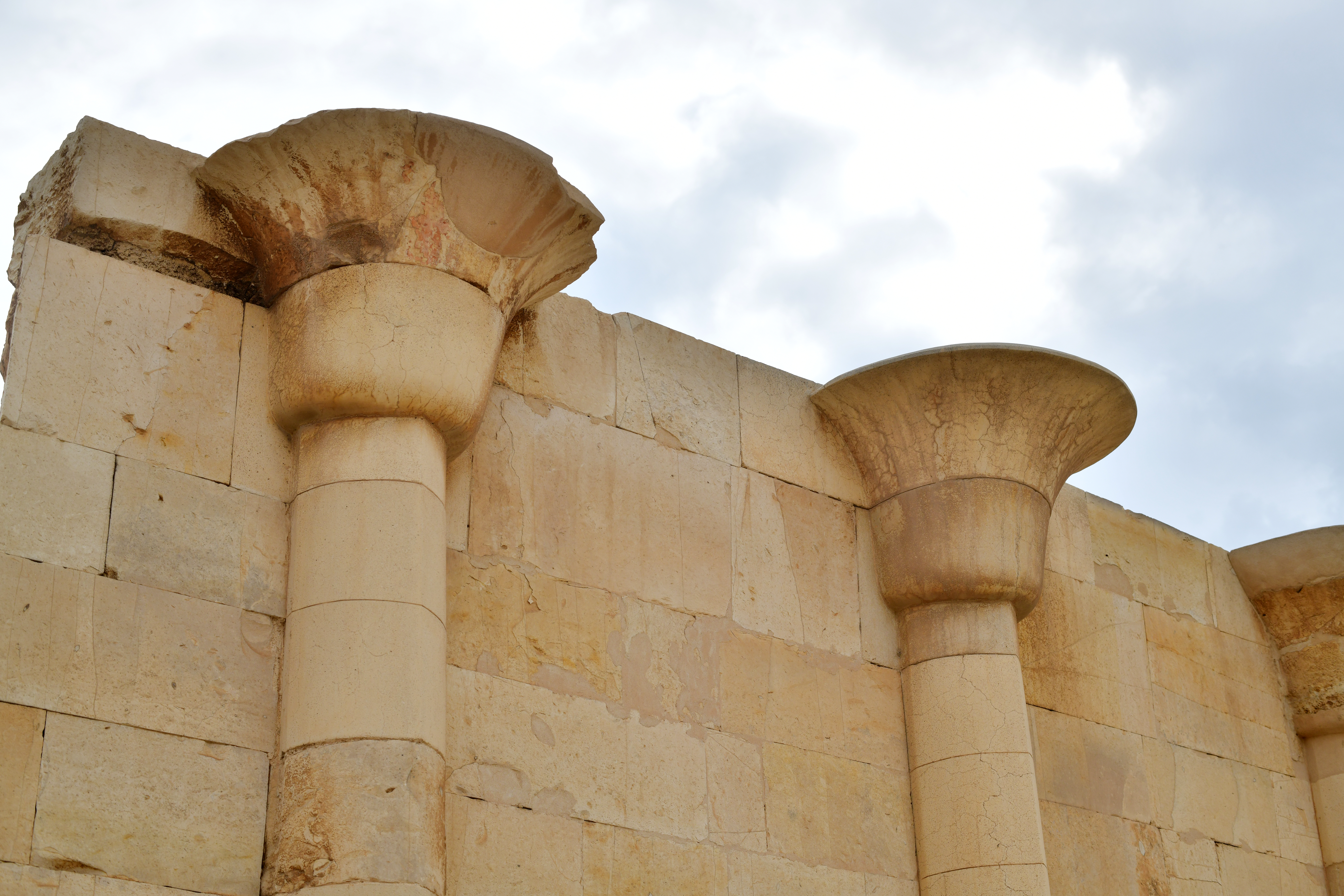
Ancient Egyptian engaged columns of the House of the North, detail of papyrus-shaped capitals, in the Heb-sed court of Djoser's Funerary Complex, Saqqara, Egypt, unknown architect, 2667–2648 BC

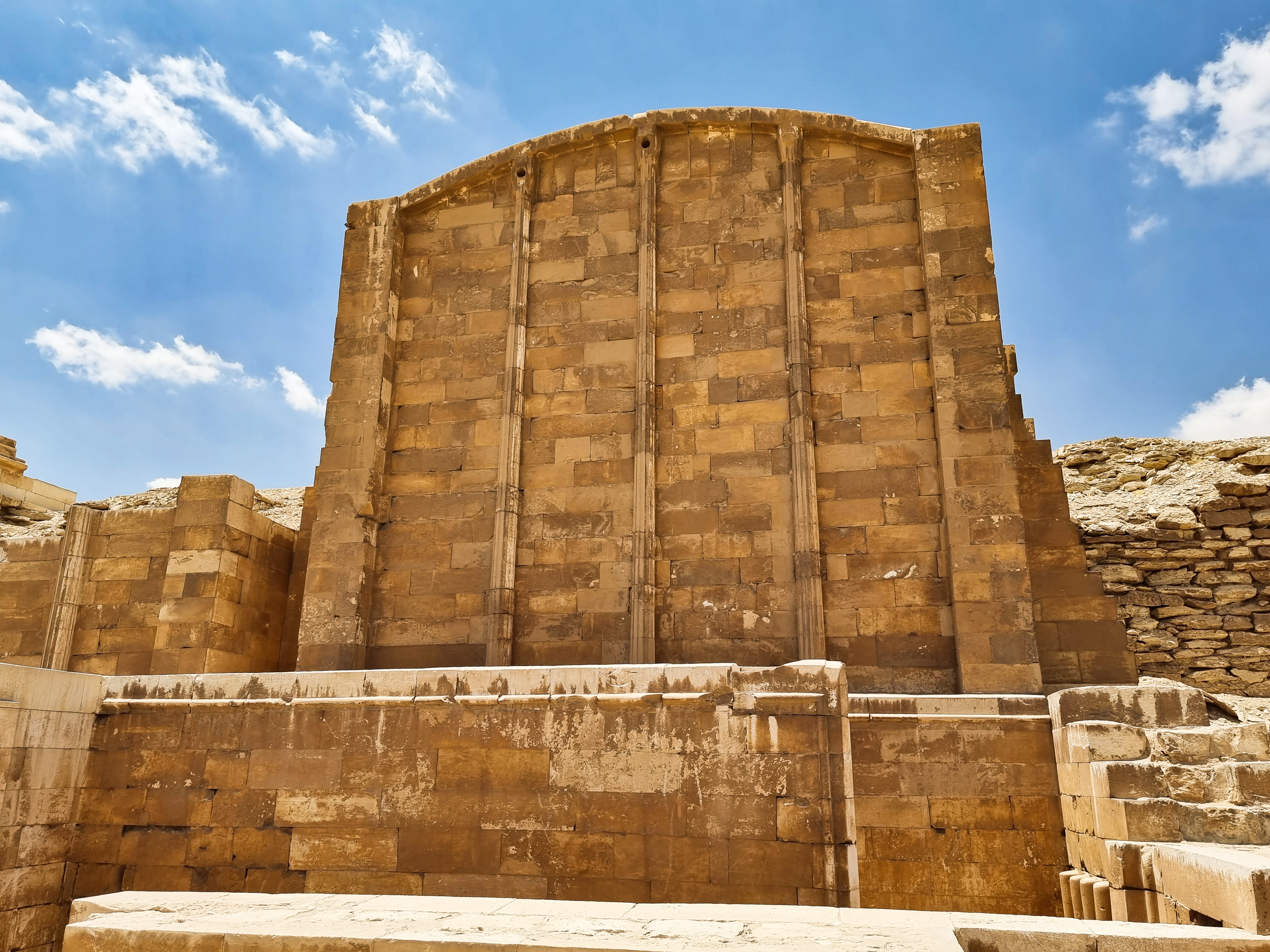
Ancient Egyptian engaged columns in the Heb-sed court of Djoser's Funerary Complex, unknown architect, 2667–2648 BC

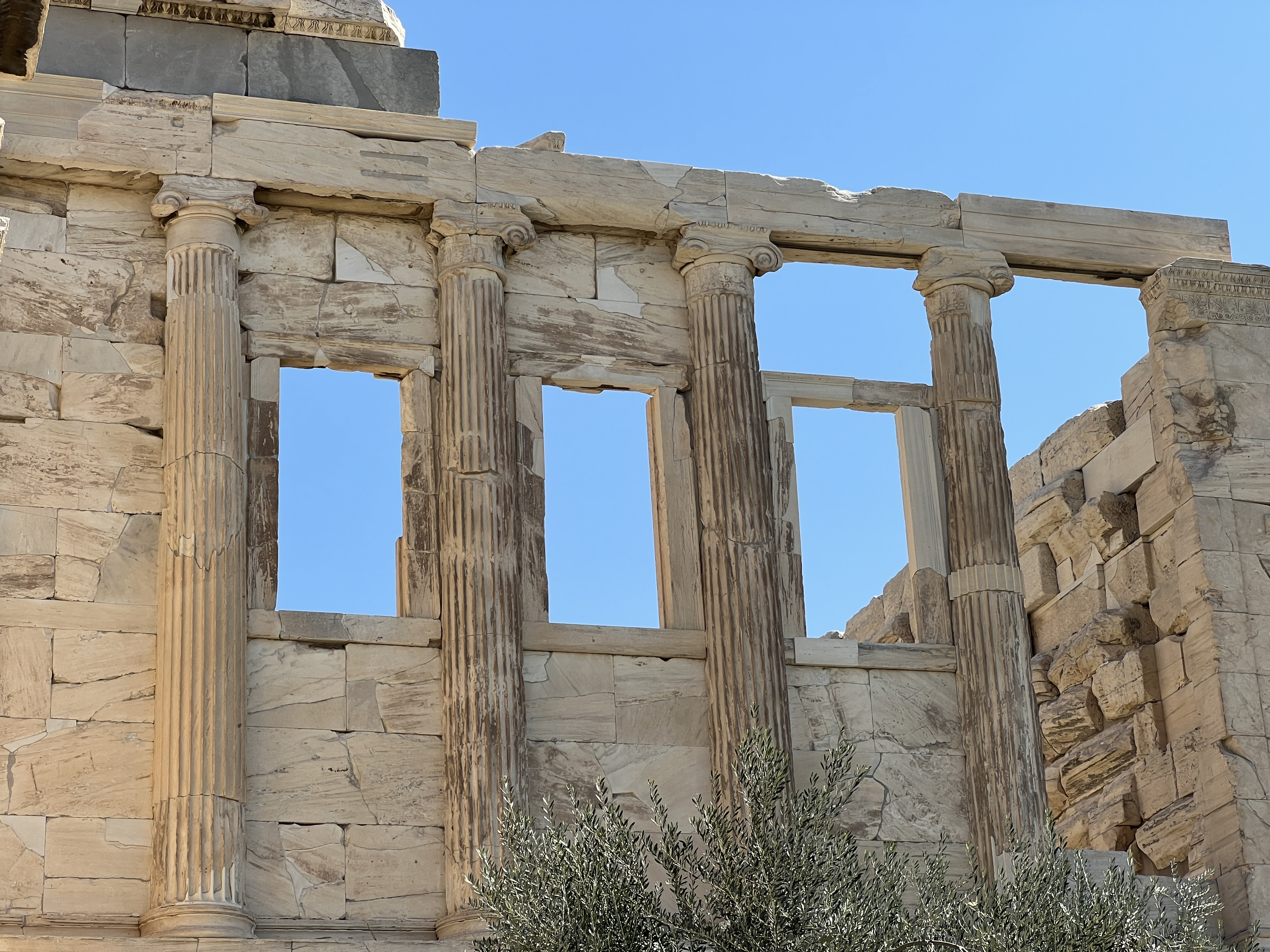
Ancient Greek engaged columns on the west façade of the Erechtheion, Athens, Greece, unknown architect, 421–406 BC

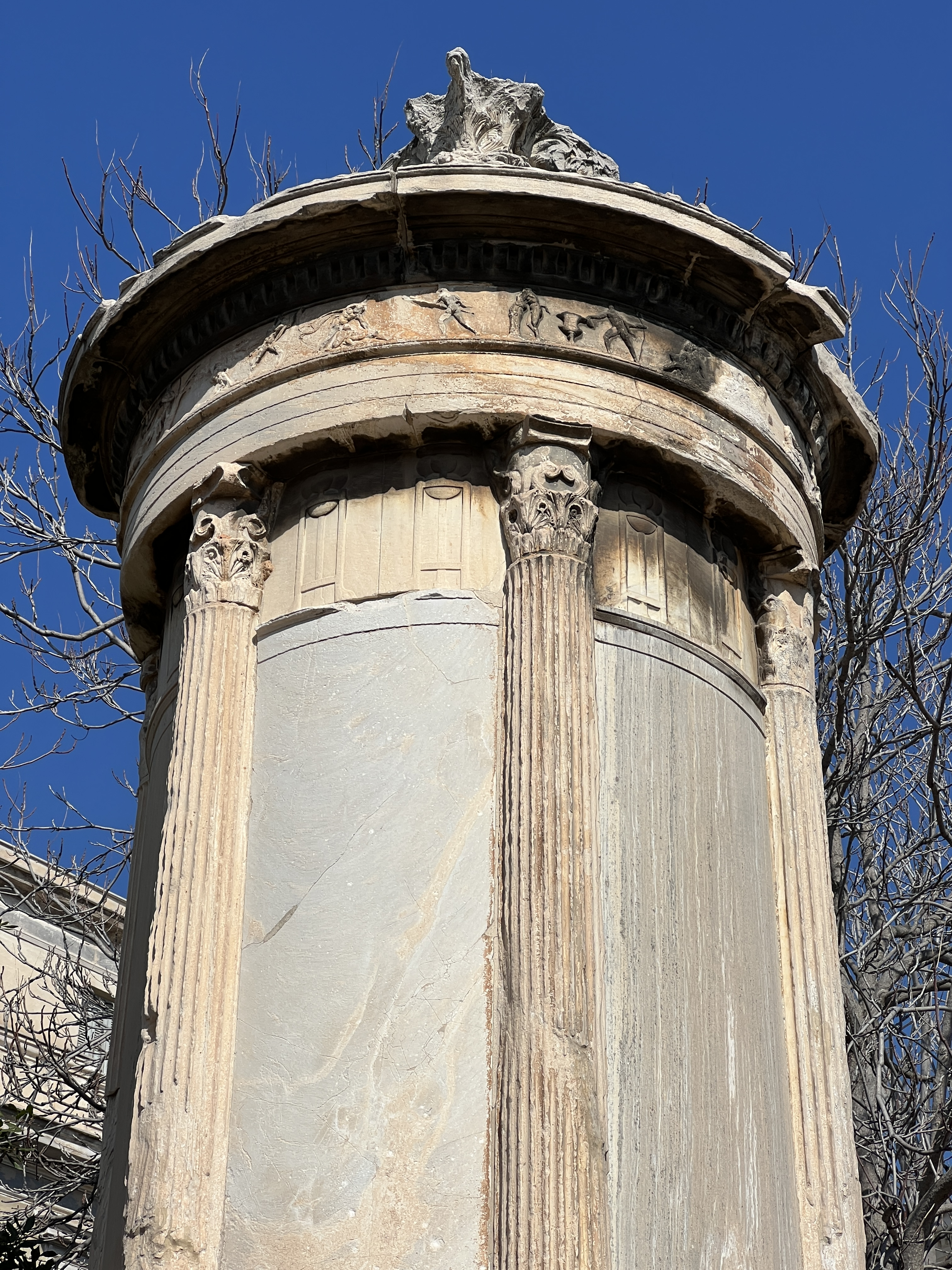
Ancient Greek engaged columns on the Choragic Monument of Lysicrates, Athens, Greece, unknown architect, 335/334 BCE

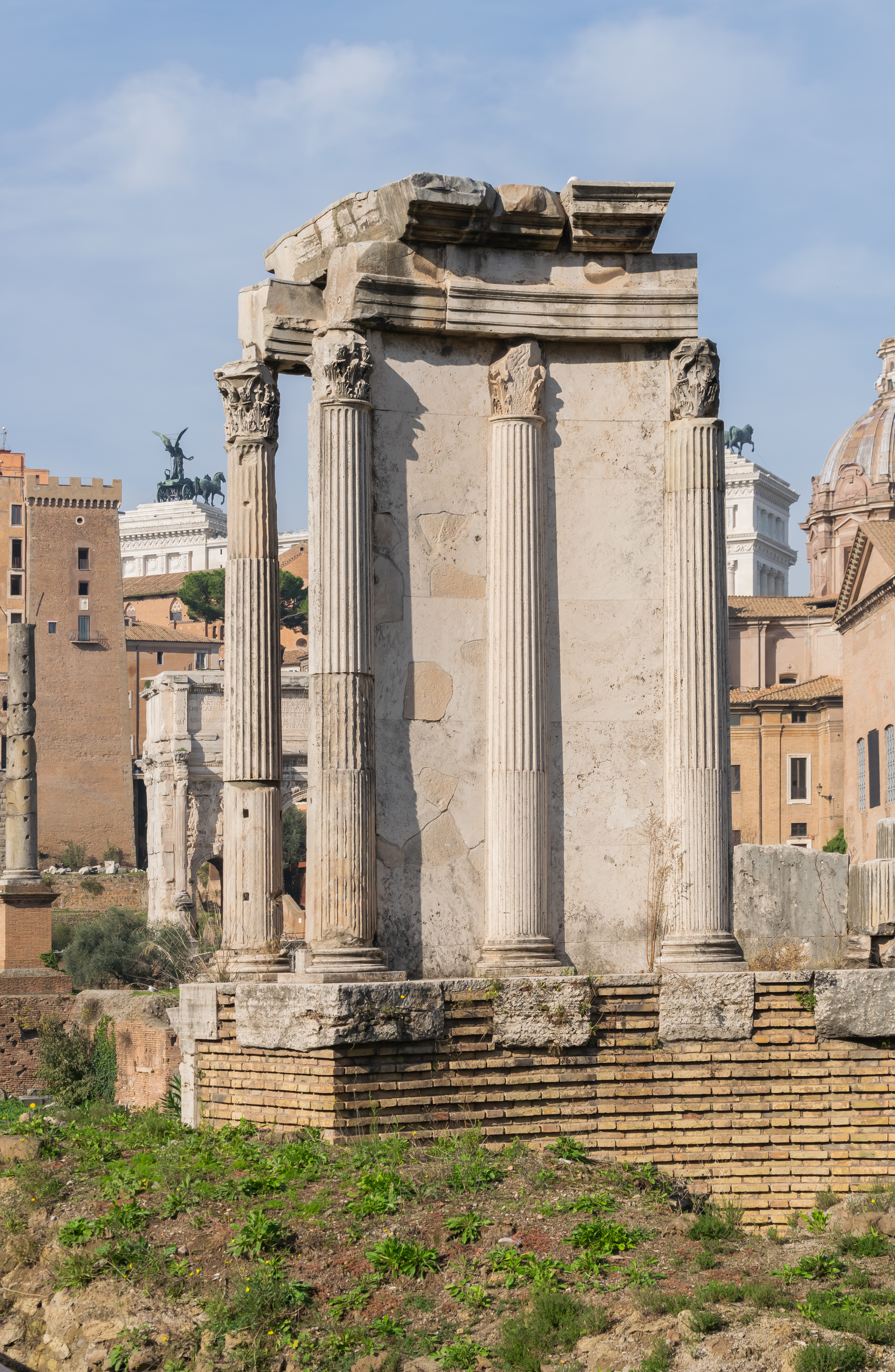
Roman engaged columns on the Temple of Vesta, Rome, Italy, unknown architect, 191 AD

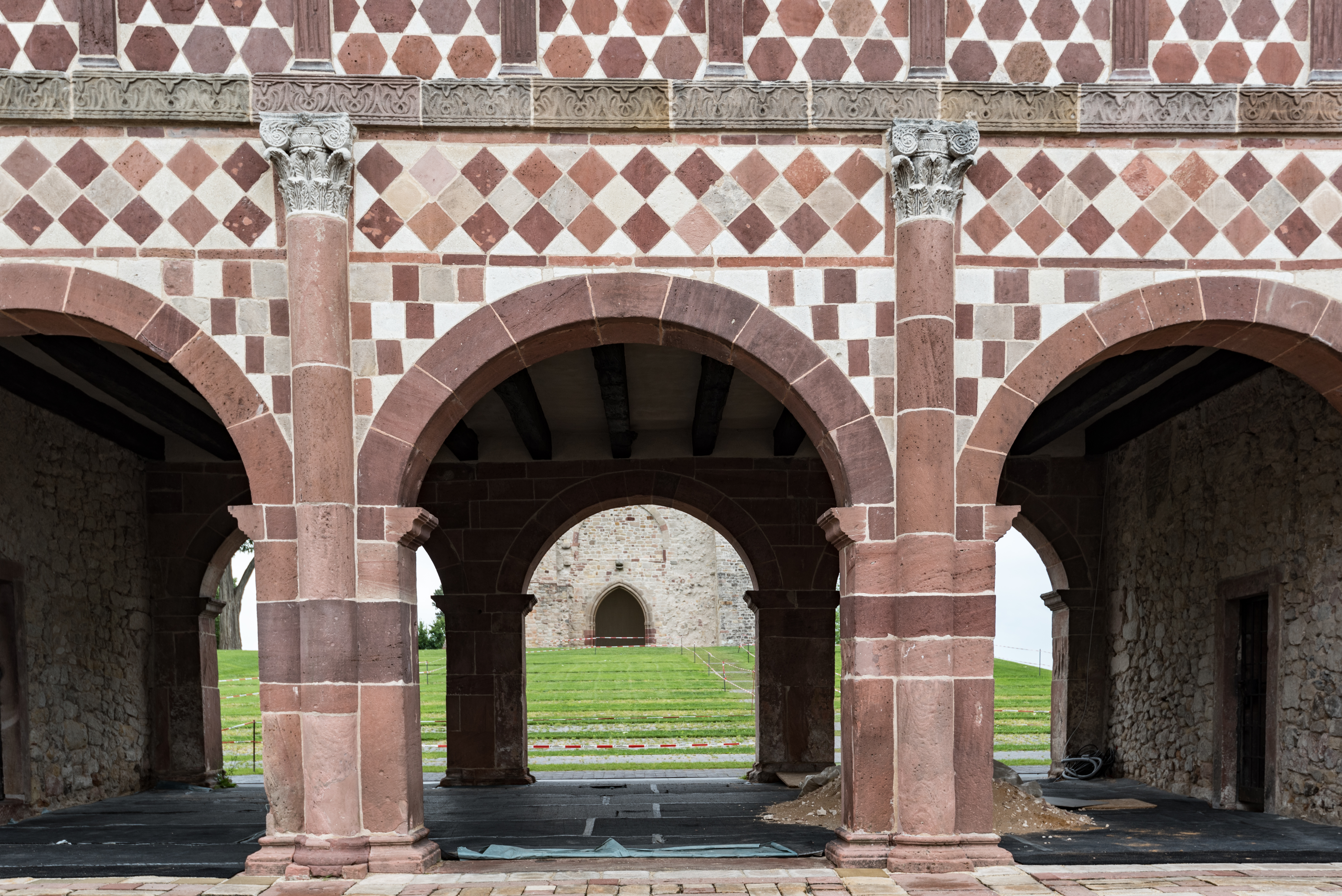
Carolingian engaged columns of the Lorsch Abbey in Lorsch, Germany, unknown architect, c.792–805

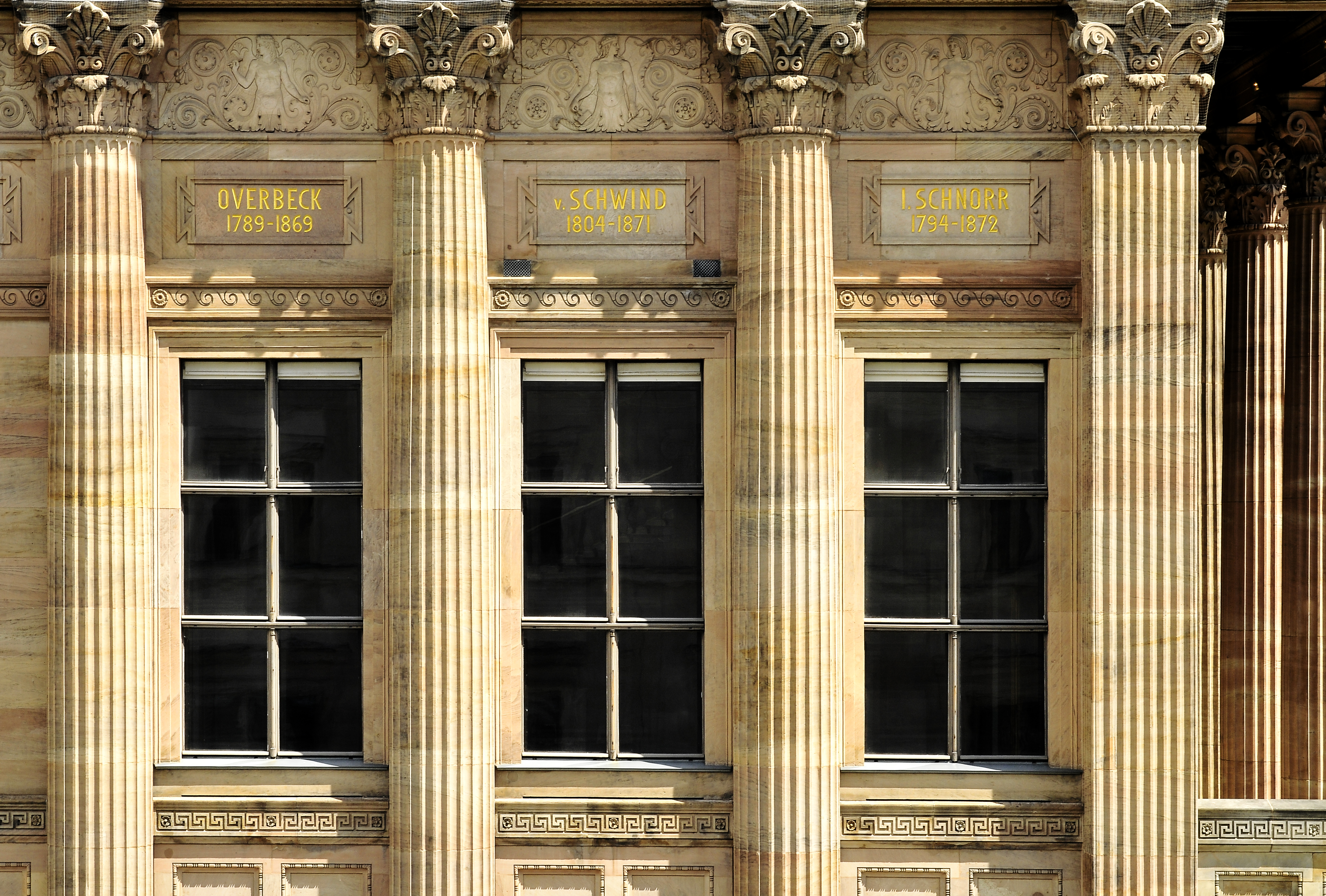
Neoclassical engaged columns of the Alte Nationalgalerie in Berlin, Germany, by Friedrich August Stüler and Johann Heinrich Strack, 1862–1876

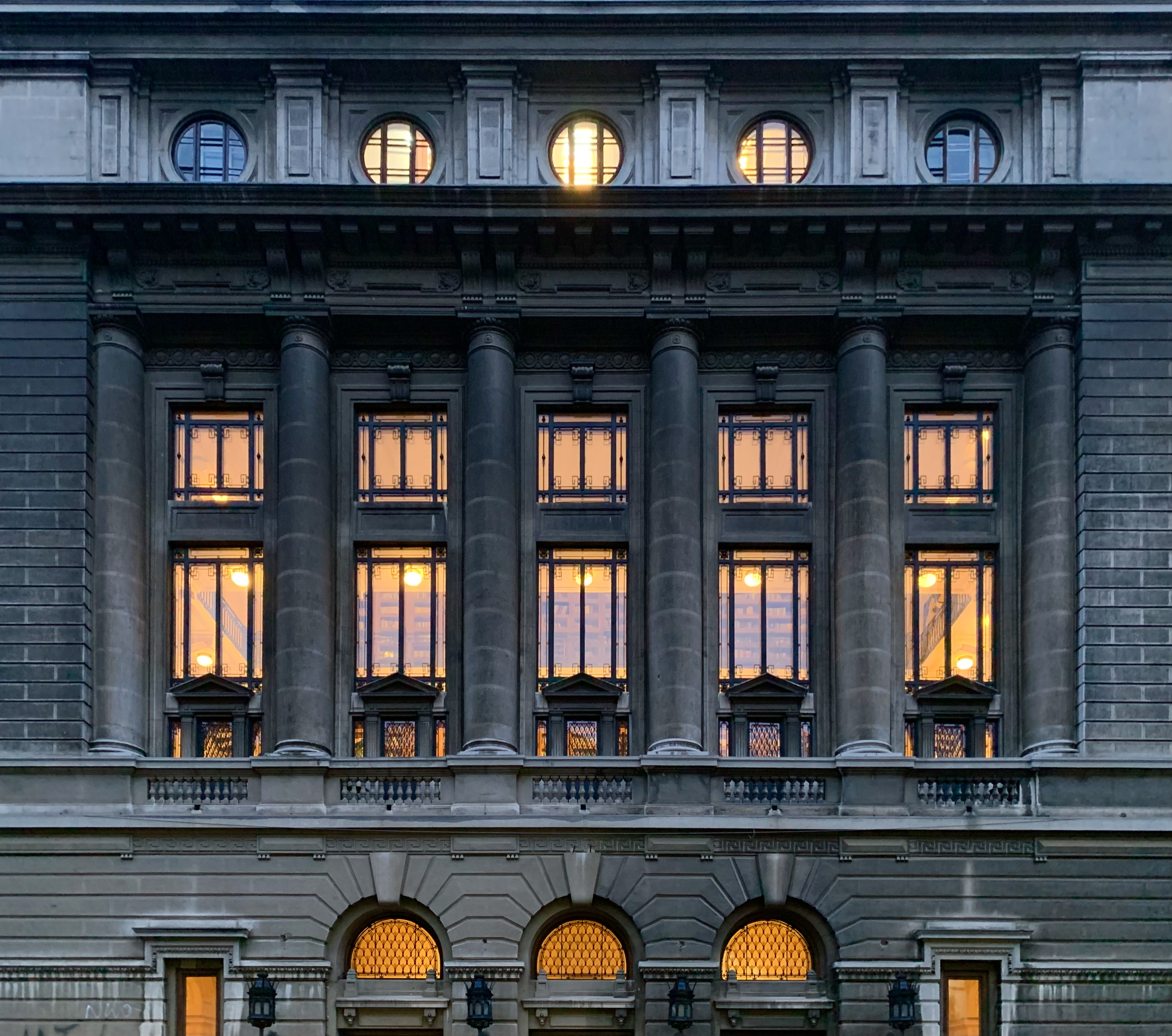
Engaged columns on the Beaux Arts facade of the University of Bucharest on Strada Edgar Quinet, Bucharest, Romania, by Nicolae Ghika-Budești, in collaboration with Duiliu Marcu, 1914–1934

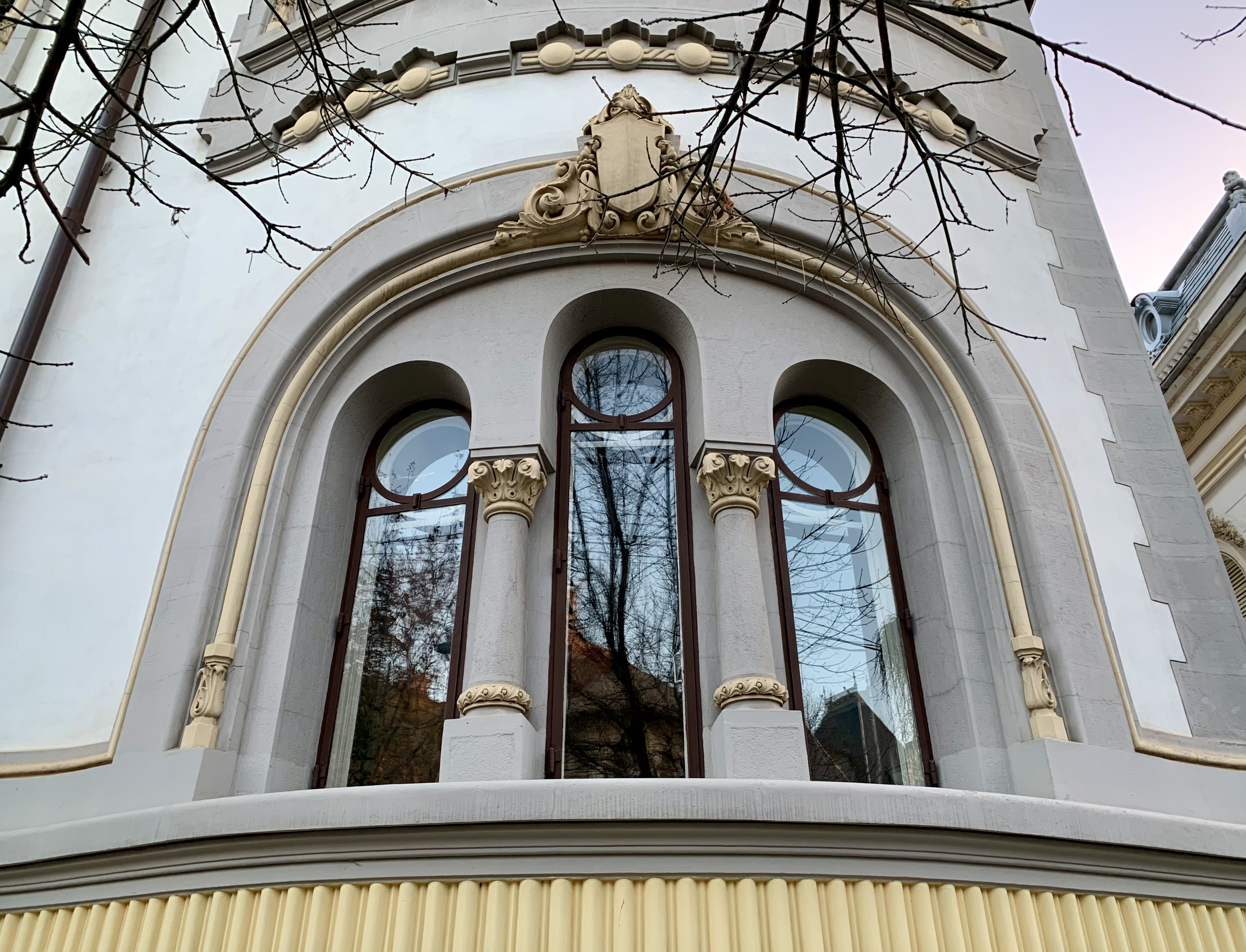
Romanian Revival engaged columns on the C.N. Câmpeanu House on Bulevardul Dacia, Bucharest, by Constantin Nănescu, c.1923

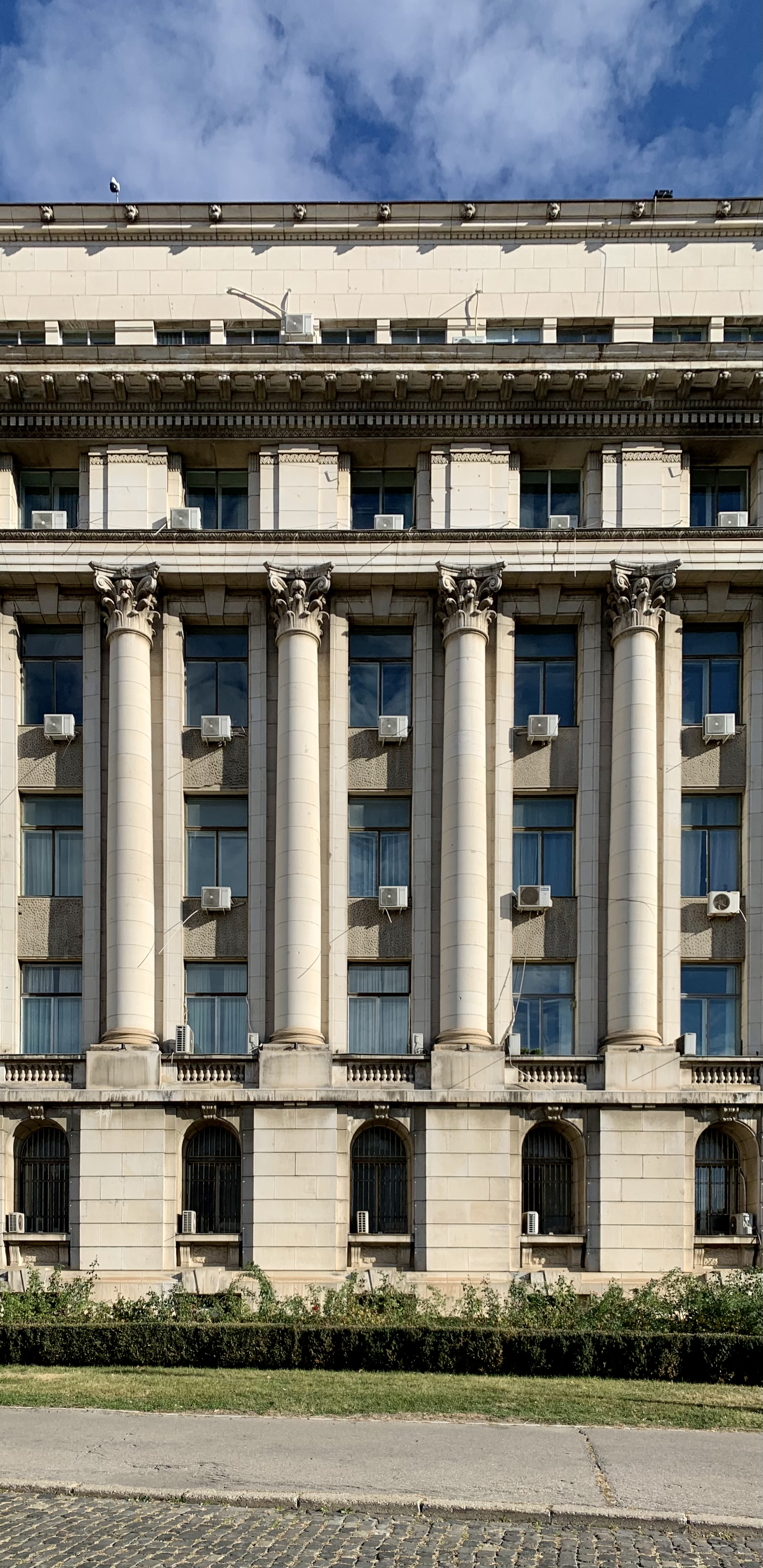
Engaged Corinthian columns on the Ministry of Internal Affairs Building, Bucharest, by Emil Nădejde, 1938–1941

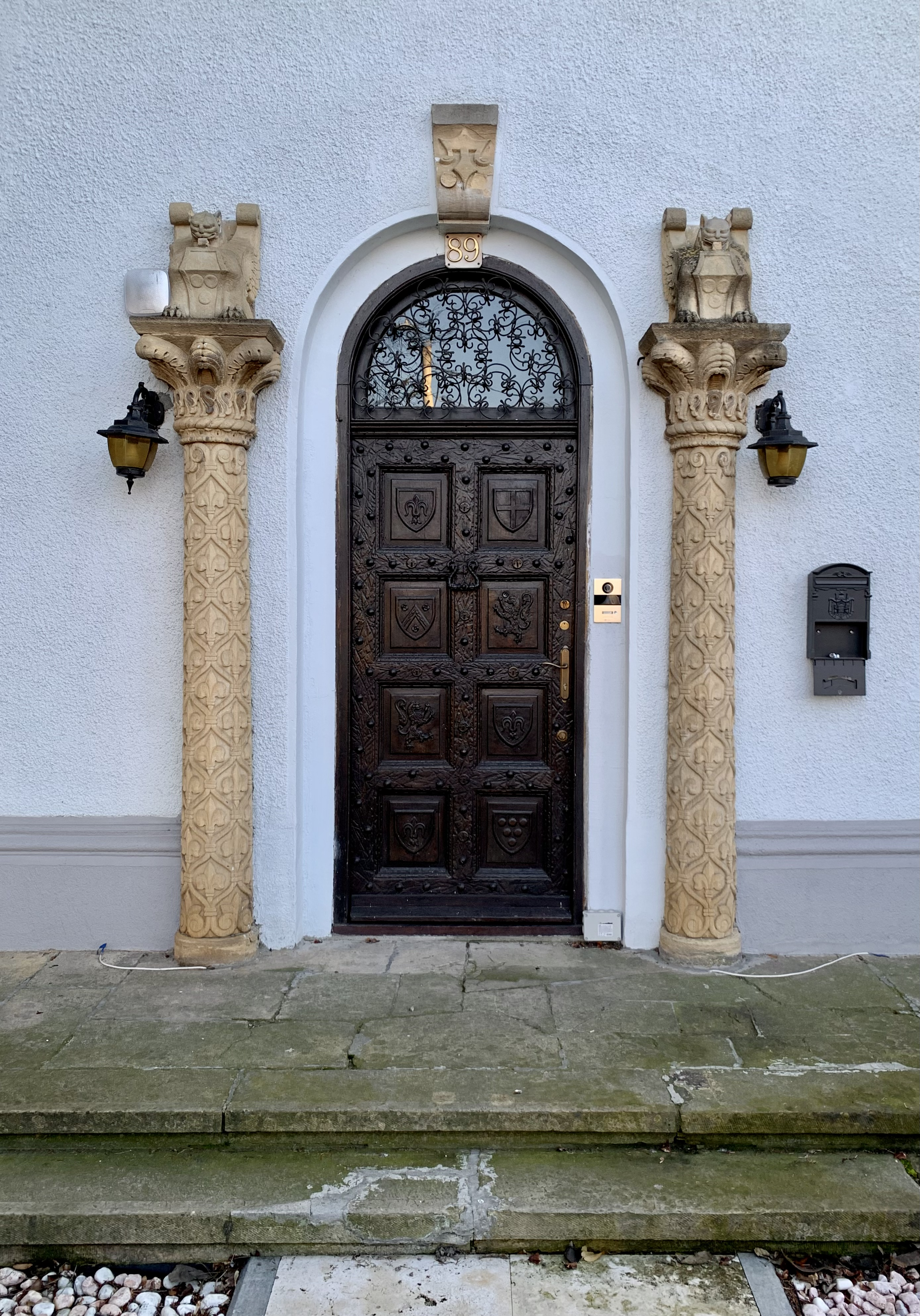
Mediterranean Revival engaged columns of the Prof. C.A. Teodorescu House on Bulevardul Eroii Sanitari, Bucharest, Ion Giurgea, 1941

== See also ==
- Hexastyle
- Hypostyle
- Octastyle
- Peristyle
- Pilaster
- Portico
- Tetrastyle
