= Belfagor arcidiavolo =

Novella by Niccolò Machiavelli written between 1518 and 1527

Belfagor arcidiavolo ("Belfagor the archdaemon") is a novella by Niccolò Machiavelli, written between 1518 and 1527, and first published with his collected works in 1549. The novella is also known as La favola di Belfagor Arcidiavolo ("The fable of Belfagor the archdaemon") and Il demonio che prese moglie ("The demon who took a wife"). Machiavelli's tale appeared in an abbreviated version published by Giovanni Brevio in 1545. Giovanni Francesco Straparola included his own version as the fourth story of the second night in his Le piacevoli notti (1557).

The "devil takes a wife" story influenced several English works: a version of it occurs in the conclusion of Rich His Farewell to Military Profession (1581) by Barnabe Rich. The popular play Grim the Collier of Croydon (published 1662) shows Machiavelli's influence. An English translation of Machiavelli's work was published in London in 1647 as The Devil a Married Man: or The Devil Hath Met with His Match. This was adapted into a play called The Devil and the Parliament (1648), later followed by Belphegor, or The Marriage of the Devil (1691) by John Wilson. William Makepeace Thackeray produced his own version of the tale in the nineteenth century.

The tale was adapted for the 1923 opera Belfagor by Ottorino Respighi. The Belfagor fable was the basis of a poem by Luigi Pirandello. The Romanian writer and satirist Ion Luca Caragiale wrote a version of the story: in Kir Ianulea, the demon takes the human form of a Greek merchant who arrives in Bucharest. The plot retains similarities with the original, with the author even mentioning Machiavelli's story.

== Synopsis ==
The story derives from Medieval Slavic folklore (and gave birth to a German and North-European version featuring a Friar Rush). In Machiavelli's account, Pluto notes that crowds of male souls arrive in Hell blaming their wives for their misery. He summons a parliament, which decides to send the former-archangel-now-archdevil Belfagor to the Earth to investigate.

Belfagor assumes a human form as one Roderigo of Castile, and comes to Florence with a hundred thousand ducats; he marries a woman named Onesta Donati. Soon, her vanity and wasteful spending, combined with the demands of her relatives, reduce him to poverty and debt. He flees imprisonment, pursued by creditors and magistrates; rescued by the peasant Gianmatteo, Belfagor grants his rescuer the power to drive devils out of possessed women – which eventually causes major problems for the peasant himself. In the end, Belfagor gratefully returns to Hell, denouncing the institution of marriage.
