= Nicolae Ghica-Budești =

Romanian architect

- Born: 22 December 1869; Iași, Romania
- Died: 16 December 1943 (aged 73); Bucharest, Kingdom of Romania
- Occupations: Architect, engineer, technical writer
- Years active: 1908–1943
- Notable work: Stătescu Villa

Nicolae Ghica-Budești (December 22, 1869 – December 16, 1943) was an influential Romanian architect who helped define the Neo-Romanian style. He studied ancient monuments in Wallachia, writing four volumes documenting the architectural history of the region. The "Muntenia and Oltenia evolution in architecture" was based on his work. His masterpiece is the Museum of the Romanian Peasant which took more than two decades to complete.

== Biography ==
Ghica-Budești was born in Iași to Eugen N. Ghika-Budești and his wife Elena Cantacuzino-Măgureanu. He attended the Collège Gaillard of Lausanne, Switzerland and the École Monge in Paris. Then, he returned and studied architecture at the School of Bridges and Roads in Bucharest from 1889 to 1893 under Anghel Saligny. He returned to Paris to study at the École des Beaux-Arts with Victor Alexandre Frederic Laloux and earned his degree in 1901. That same year, he married Madeleine Landrieu (1869–1951) in Paris. They had two children: Ion Ghica-Budești and geologist Ștefan Ghica-Budești.

He returned to Romania in 1905 and until 1906, he was the lead architect for the Ministry of Religious Affairs and Public Education. In 1906, he became the chief architect and technical consultant for the Historical Monuments Commission, holding the position until his death in 1943. He headed the restoration work for many medieval monuments during his tenure. He also became a professor at the National School of Architecture starting in 1910 and continuing through 1938. In 1937, Ghica-Budești was made an honorary member of the Romanian Academy and served as president of the Romanian Architects Society from 1932 to 1935.

In the period between the wars, there was a push to preserve Romanian culture. Nicolae Iorga, historian and politician, was particularly concerned that modernity would sweep away the past. He began to document and research historic monuments and paved the way for a comprehensive study of the monasteries and churches of the country. This massive study was carried out by George Balș, who documented Moldavian sites and Ghica-Budeşti, who wrote four volumes of historiography of architecture after an in-depth study of properties in Muntenia and Oltenia, Wallachia. The "Muntenia and Oltenia evolution in architecture" was based primarily on his studies and writing. He was considered one of the leading experts of his time, along with Ion Mincu and Petre Antonescu.

His work was considered eclectic, but he developed a composite Neo-Romanian style, utilizing brick and stone carvings which incorporated medieval Moldovan architectural details and Wallachian elements. Ghika-Budești's style is "unmistakable", utilizing horseshoe arches, Gothic windows and door frames, glazed ceramic tiles, in green shades offsetting the red brick and neutral stone. Often there are towers and geometrical motifs featuring sawtooth quoins.

He designed and constructed the Muzeul Național al Țăranului Român (Romanian National Peasant Museum) between 1912 and 1939, added a new wing to the University of Bucharest in a collaboration with A. Baucher between 1928 and 1930, built Cuțitul de Argint Church, Saint Basil the Great Cathedral at No. 50 Polonă Street, the Radu Rosetti House at No. 3-5 Mihail Moxa Street, and the Pasteur Institute of Serum and Vaccines, all located in Bucharest. He also designed and built the Saint Nicholas-Copou Church in Iași, the high school at Râmnicu Vâlcea (now Alexandru Lahovari National College), and Vasile Alecsandri's Mausoleum in Mircești.

In 1914, he built a mansion for George Știrbey in Dărmănești surrounded by the Ciuc Mountains. The building is distinguished by its architectural massiveness. Red brick and simple stone decorations in a silhouette reminiscent of bell towers lend the structure the appearance of a monastery. Partially plastered façades and masonry hold decorative wooden fachwerk balconies. The main structure has two floors and a single-story L wing. The most stunning elements are the hardwood staircase, a massive stone fireplace, and the open terrace overlooking the Nemira Mountains.

The planning for the Saint Nicholas-Copou Church in Iași was begun in February 1934 with the establishment of a building committee and selection of Ghica-Budești as architect. Various disputes over location delayed the onset of building until 1937 and the uncertainty leading up to World War II caused several work stoppages, but the building managed to secure financing in 1939 with the help of Nicolae Iorga. Ghica-Budești died in 1943 in Bucharest.

== Written works ==
- Mânăstirea Probota (with G. Balș), Institutul de arte grafice Carol Göbl: Bucharest (1909) (Arta românească nr. 3)
- Evoluția arhitecturii în Muntenia și Oltenia, I. Înrâuririle străine de la origine pâna la Neagoe Basarab, in Buletinul Comisiunii Monumentelor Istorice (BCMI) XX (1927), issues 53–54, pp. 121–158
- Evoluția arhitecturii în Muntenia și Oltenia, II. Vechiul stil românesc din veacul al XVI-lea, in BCMI, XXIII (1930), issues 63–66
- Evoluția arhitecturii în Muntenia și Oltenia, III. Veacul al XVII-Iea, în BCMI XXV (1932), issues 71–74
- Evoluția arhitecturii în Muntenia și Oltenia, IV. Noul stil din veacul al XVIII-lea, in BCMI, XXIX (1936), issues 87–90

== Photo gallery ==
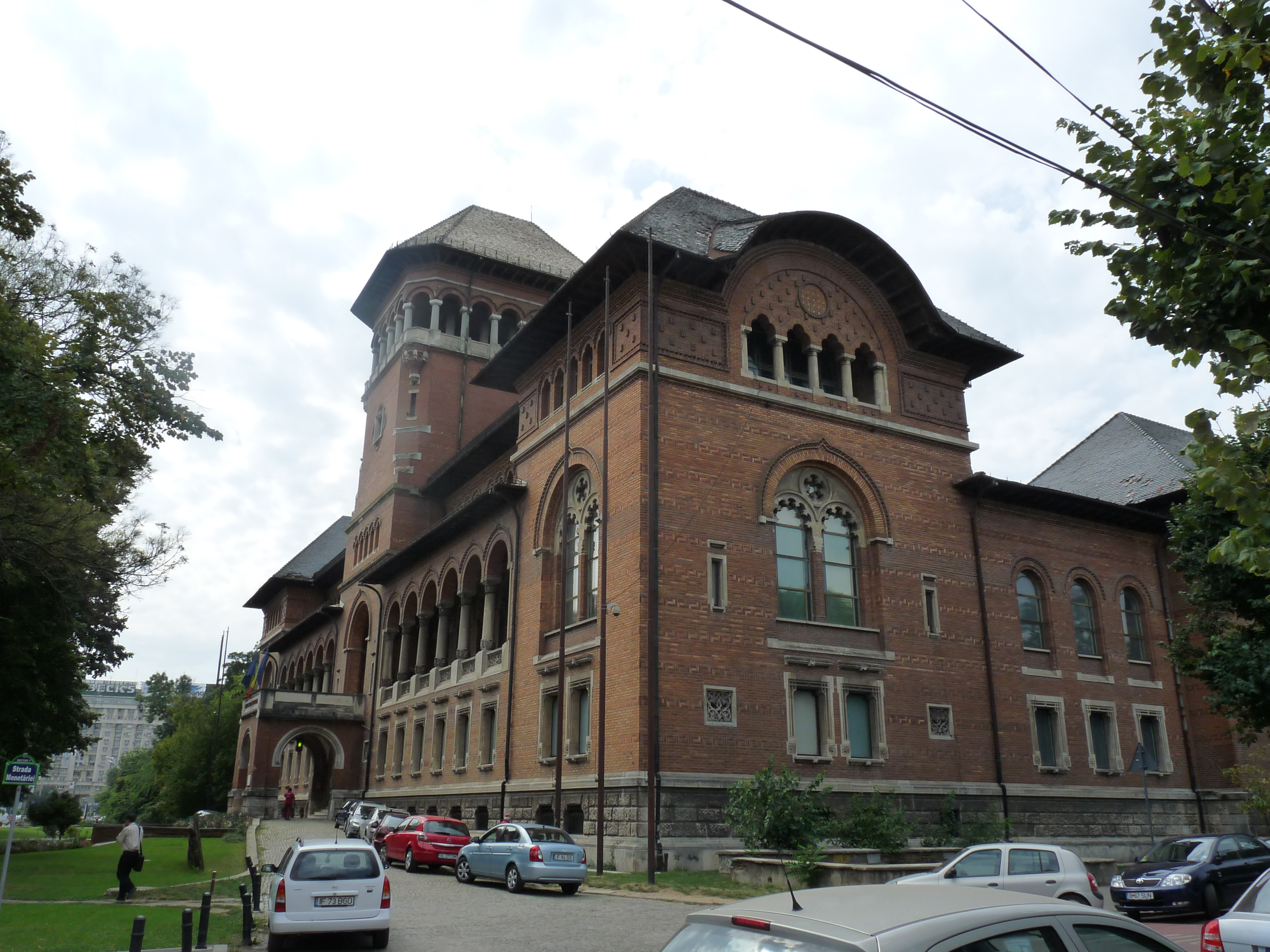
Romanian National Peasant Museum

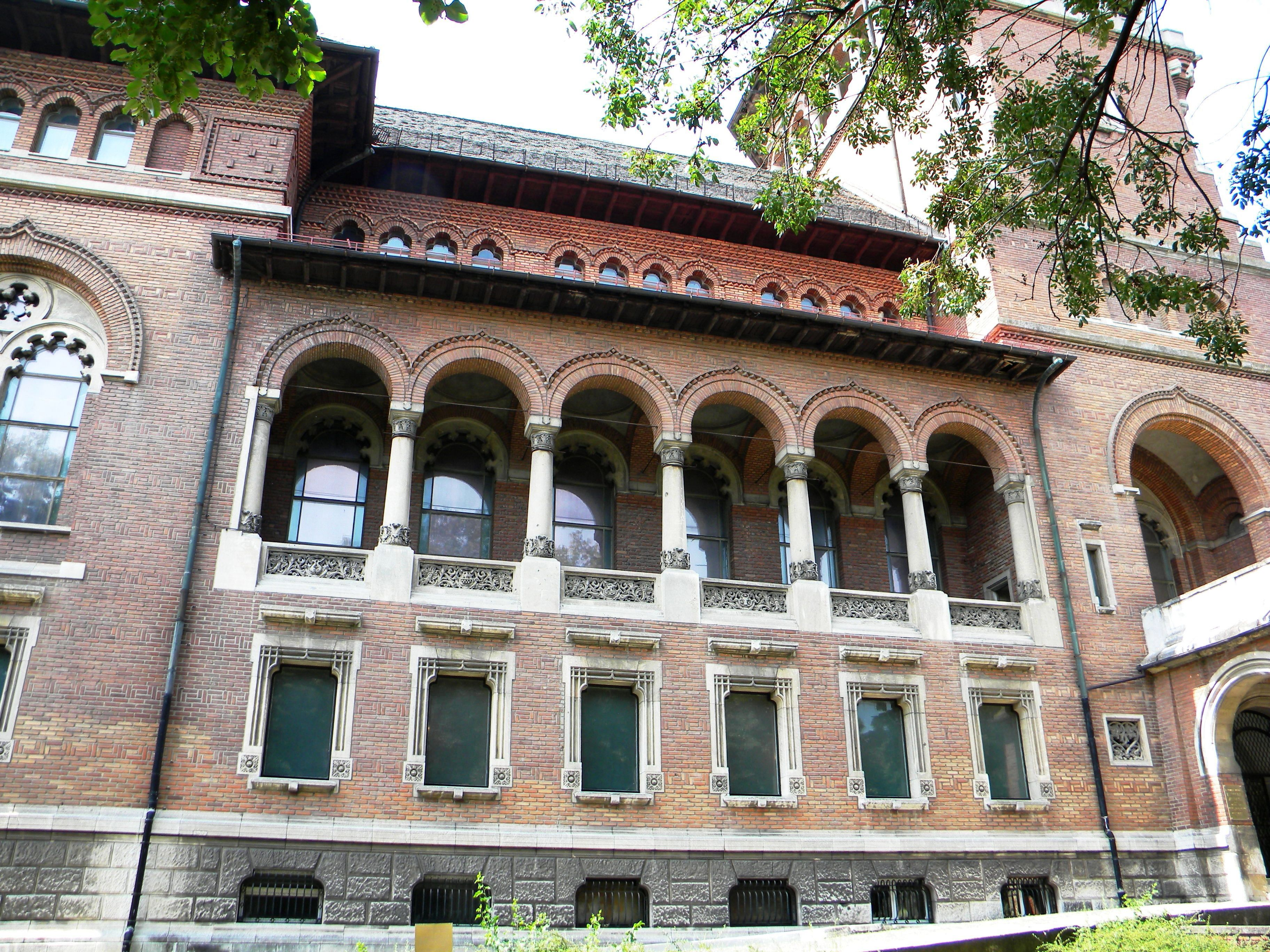
Romanian National Peasant Museum, Neo-Romanian style

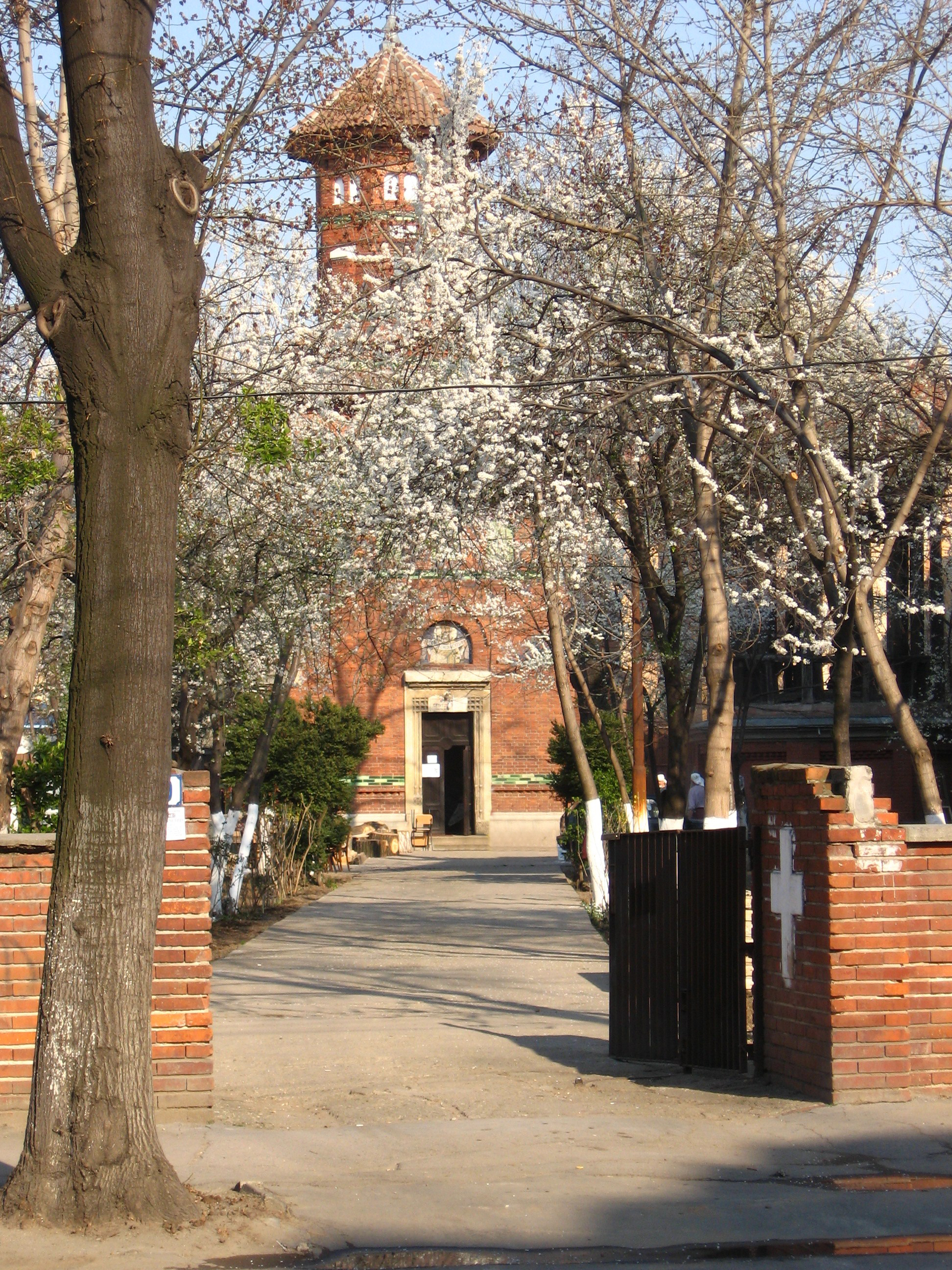
Saint Basil the Great Cathedral, Bucharest

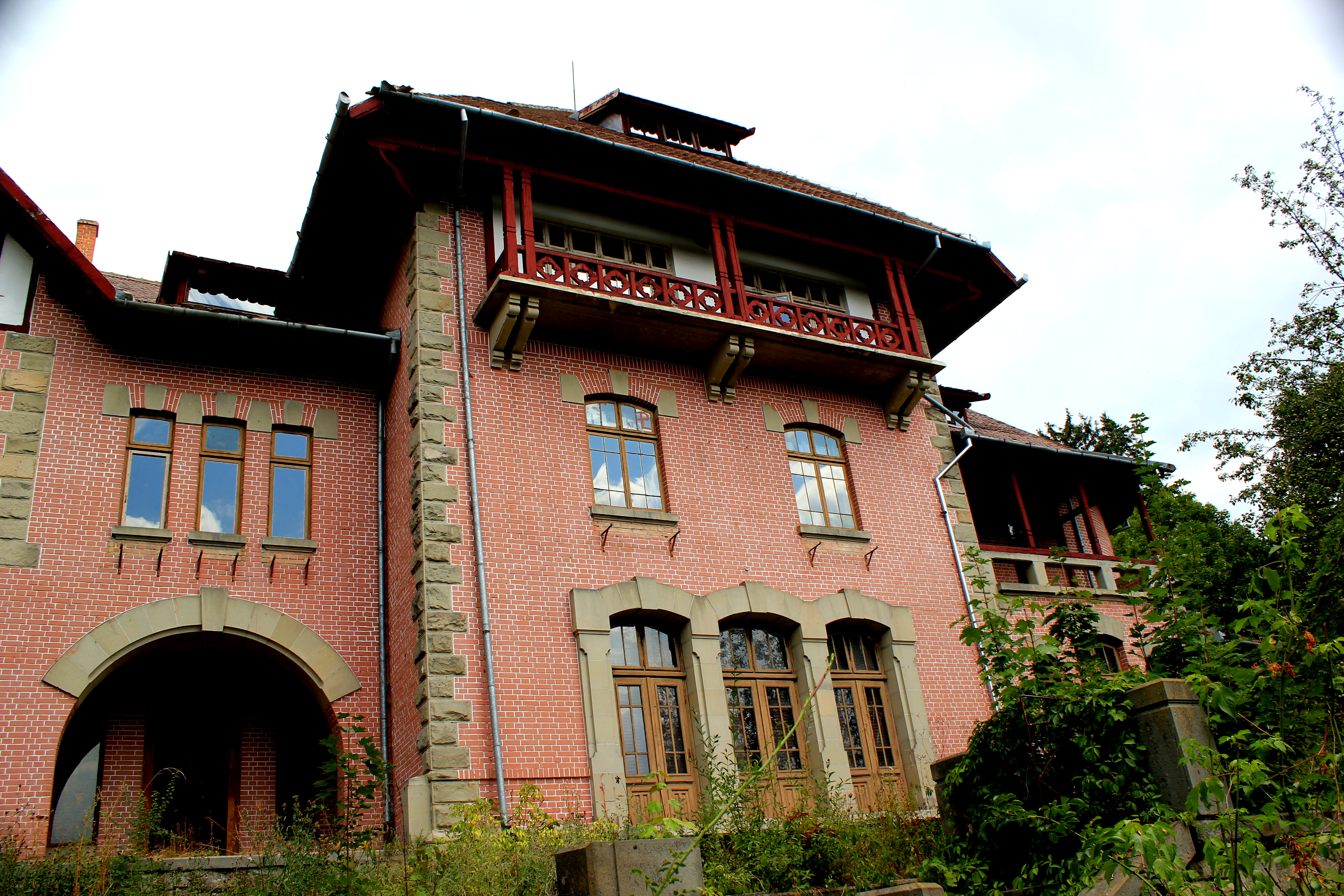
George and Marina Știrbei's Dărmănești manor
