= Silver Knife Church =

Orthodox church in Bucharest, Romania

Coordinates: 44°24′50″N 26°05′34″E

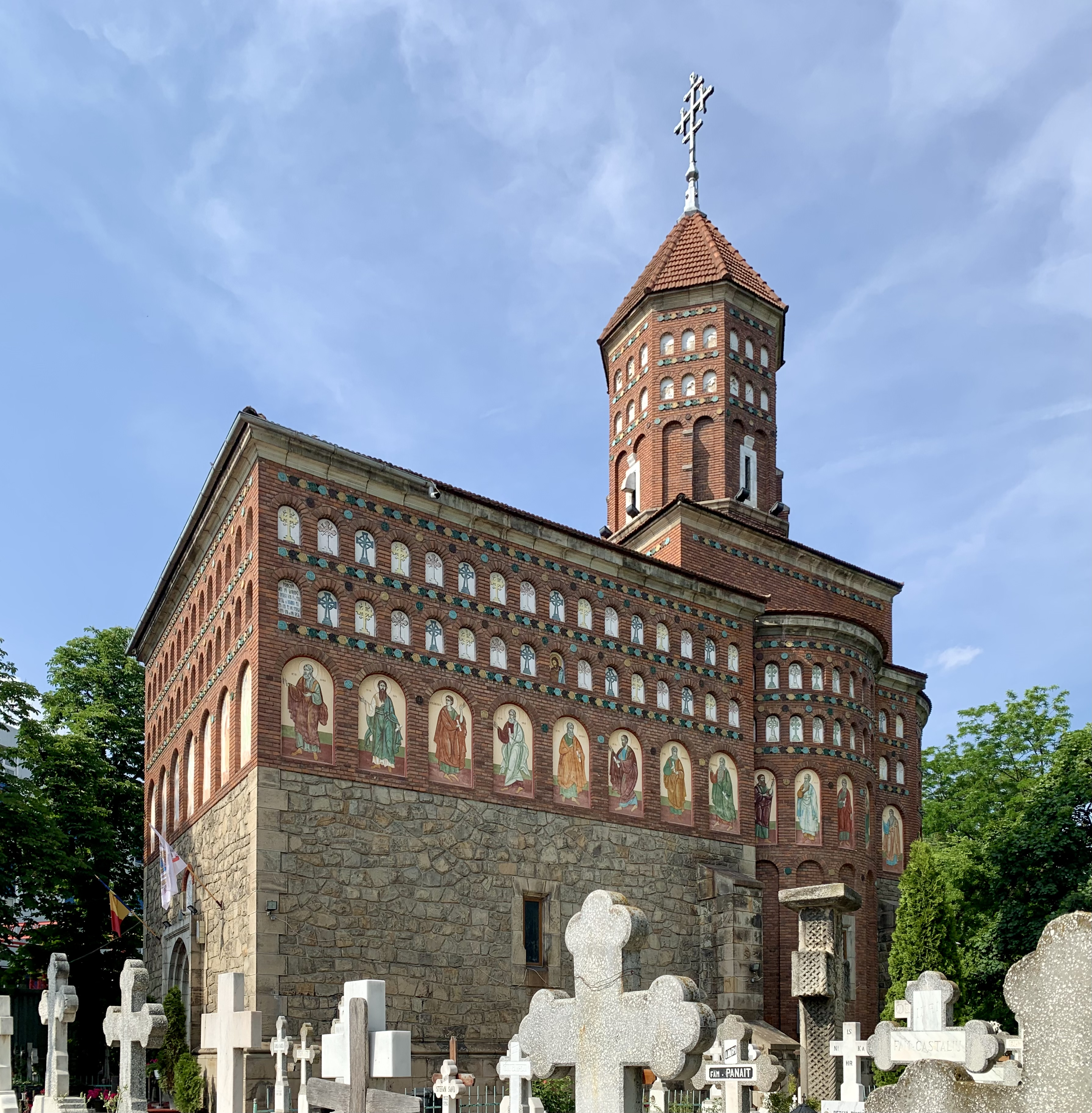
The church in May 2022

The Silver Knife Church (Romanian: Biserica Cuțitul de Argint) is a Romanian Orthodox church located at 1 Cuțitul de Argint Street in Bucharest, Romania. It is dedicated to the Feast of the Transfiguration.

The church is located on Filaret Hill, adjacent to Carol Park. It is also known as New Bărbătescu, as the area used to form part of Old Bărbătescu parish. A small church without a dome used to stand on the same site. This was built in 1796 and existed as late as 1897.

The present church was built in 1906–1910, for the jubilee marking 40 years on the throne for King Carol I. It was inspired by Saint Nicholas Princely Church in Iași, itself built to commemorate 40 years of Stephen the Great’s reign. Nicolae Ghica-Budești was the architect, while Costin Petrescu painted the interior in 1908–1910.

The paintings were cleaned and the iconostasis was gilt in 1926; further repairs were carried out in 1949. A choir gallery was added in 1919. The wooden iconostasis sculpted with floral designs has icons painted by Petrescu in 1907. Thorough repairs were carried out in 1992–1995, when the interior and part of the exterior frescoes were repainted.

The church is triconch in form, with walls up to 1.5 metres (4 feet 11 inches) thick. Adhering to the Moldavian style of church architecture, its dimensions are 22.65 by 10.60 metres (74.3 by 34.8 feet). A large stone cross was placed on the right side of the church in 1906. This dates to 1677, to the reign of Antonie Ruset. It is ornamented and inscribed in Romanian Cyrillic.

The church is listed as a historic monument by Romania's Ministry of Culture and Religious Affairs.
