= Maison de l'armateur of Le Havre =

Museum in Le Havre, France

Coordinates: 49.487092°N 0.1126956°E

La Maison de l'Armateur
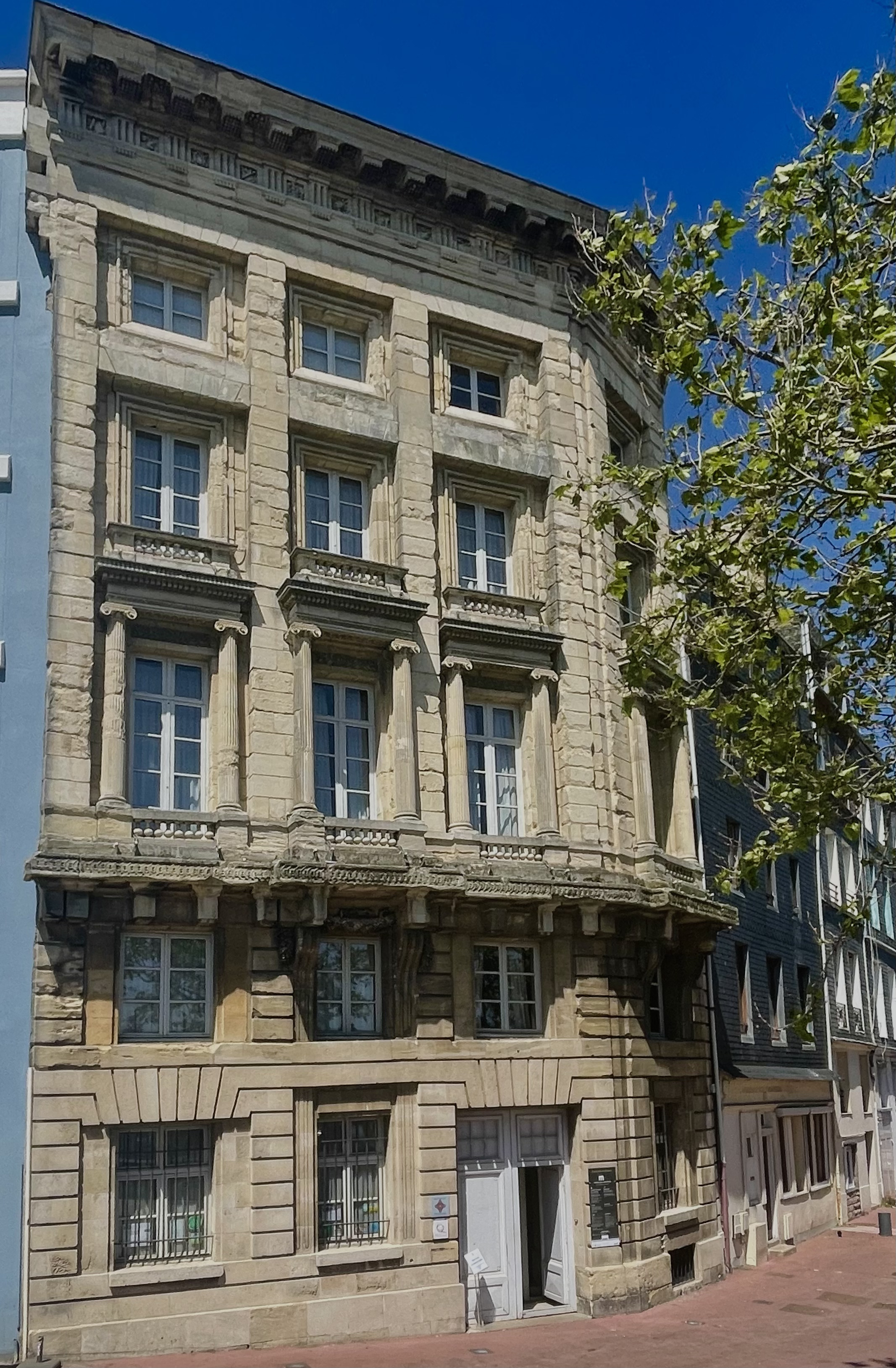
- Façade of the Ship Owner's House

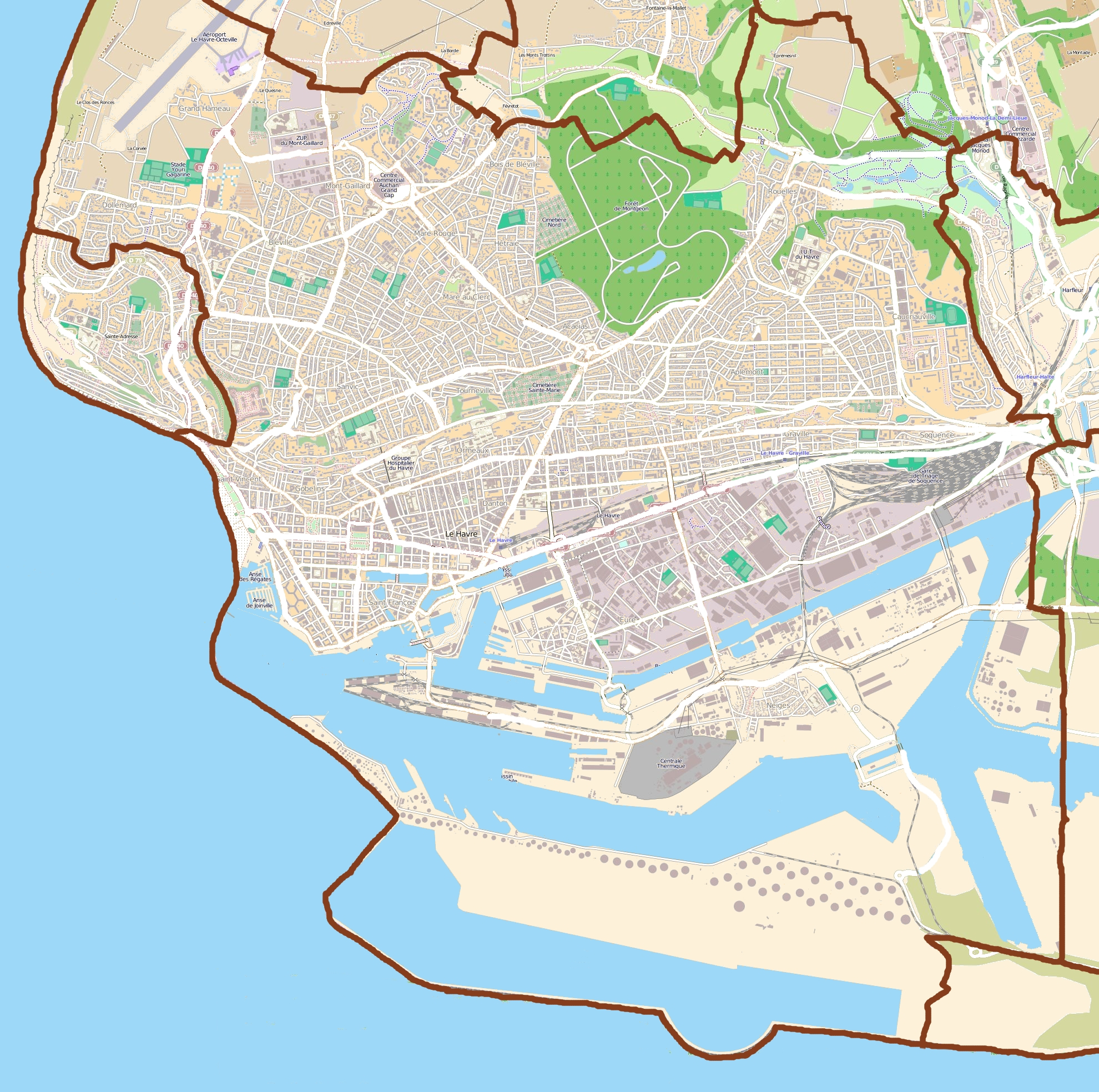
- Location in Le Havre
- Established: 2006
- Location: Le Havre, France
- Type: Museum of Art and History
- Website: www.musee-mah-lehavre.fr

La Maison de l'armateur (The Ship Owner's House) is one of the departments of the Museum of Art and History of Le Havre, Normandy region, France. It is located in a building situated in the 18th century. The name of the house originates from the profession of its previous owners, the Foäche family, who possessed a ship company. The museum presents the history of Le Havre and illustrates the lifestyle of the French bourgeoisie in the 18th century.

== History ==
The building of the Maison de l'Armateur was designed by Paul-Michel Thibault (1735–1799), who was born into a family of Parisian traders who worked in the ports of Normandy. He worked as a designer and constructor of fortifications and fountains in Le Havre. The building where the museum is currently located was intended to be his private house which he built according to the principles of neoclassical style which was on the rise at the end of the 18th century. As an engineer he incorporated the latest technological innovations of that time into the structure of the house.

After the death of Paul-Michel Thibault, the house was bought by Martin-Pierre Foäche (1728–1816), who owned a shipping company. The Foäche family used the building not only as a private house but also as space for their company's office. The members of the Foäche family had been holding posts in the trade and administration of Le Havre since 1600, including slave trading, which was legal in 17th-century France, thus they could afford decorating the house in accordance with the latest trends.

To create the interior of the house, Martin-Pierre Foäche invited Pierre-Adrien Pâris (1747–1819), the designer of the royal chancellery.

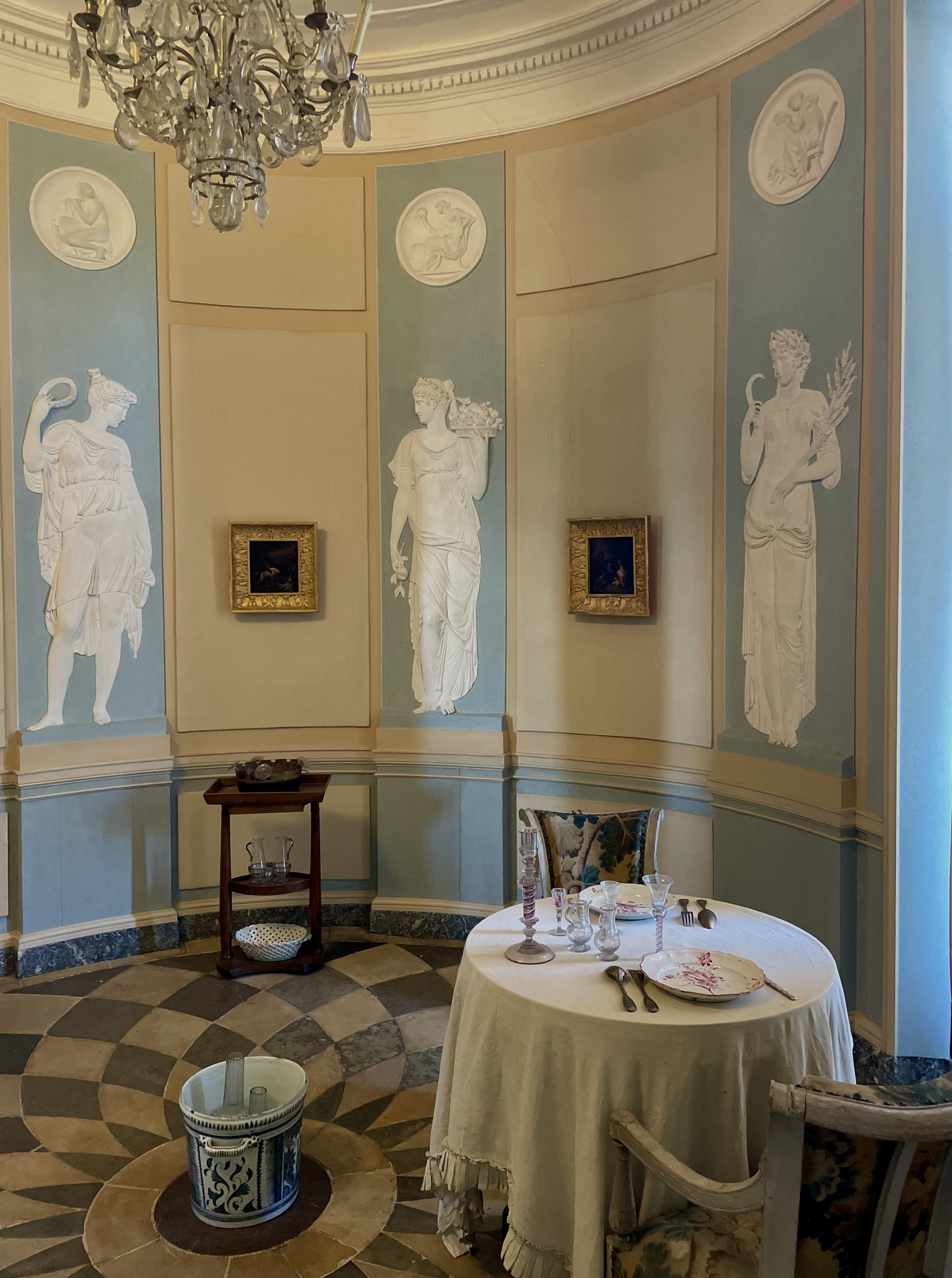
Decoration of the dining room at the Ship Owner's House

The background of Pierre-Adrien Pâris defined the style of his works. He lived in Rome after obtaining a pension from the French Academy in 1771. There he got acquainted with Hubert Robert and Jean-Honoré Fragonard, famous painters of that time. However, after the death of the king (Louis XV), he settled down in Normandy for some time, where he dedicated his time to building private property for the local bourgeoisie (for example, the Colmoulins mansion in nearby Harfleur). The influence of antiquity and Italian heritage can be easily observed in his projects (including the project of the Maison de l'Armateur).

In 1830, after the bankruptcy of the "Foäche Brothers" company, the building was converted into the hotel "Etats-Unis" ("United States"). Since 1857, multiple trading companies had occupied the building (Barbe & Brown). In 1891, the house was divided into apartments for rent and was owned by the Richer family until 1955, when it was sold to the city of Le Havre. During the Second World War, the building was damaged and required restoration, which started in 1944, right after the house was added to the supplementary list of historical monuments. The restoration of the exterior started in the 1950s under the supervision of the architects of the "Monuments Historiques," Jean-Pierre Paquet, then Dominique Moufle, while the interior decor was restored only in the 1990s. Most of the initial furniture of the house was damaged and replaced with replicas.

In 1955, the building was bought by the city authorities and was under restoration until 2005. In 2006, it was opened to the public as the Museum of Art and History in Le Havre.

== Architecture ==
The design of the façade and layout of the building comply with the rules of Neoclassicism. The exterior is decorated with balustrades, entablature windows, four bays with ionic columns, garlands of foliage, and a cornice under the roof. The main type of stone used for the façade is rusticated ashlar. The building has 5 floors and 20 rooms (including bedrooms, a dining hall, a kitchen, a dining hall, a music room, a drawing room, a reading room, a library, etc.). The rooms are located on each floor according to their function. The ground floor was used as a stable and warehouse. On the first floor were the kitchen, offices, and studies, while the second floor mostly housed the apartments: the dining, drawing, and music rooms, as well as bedrooms of the owners. The third and fourth floors were dedicated to other private spaces (library, guest room, reading room and other spaces which are now used for exhibitions of glassware, maps, paintings, etc.).

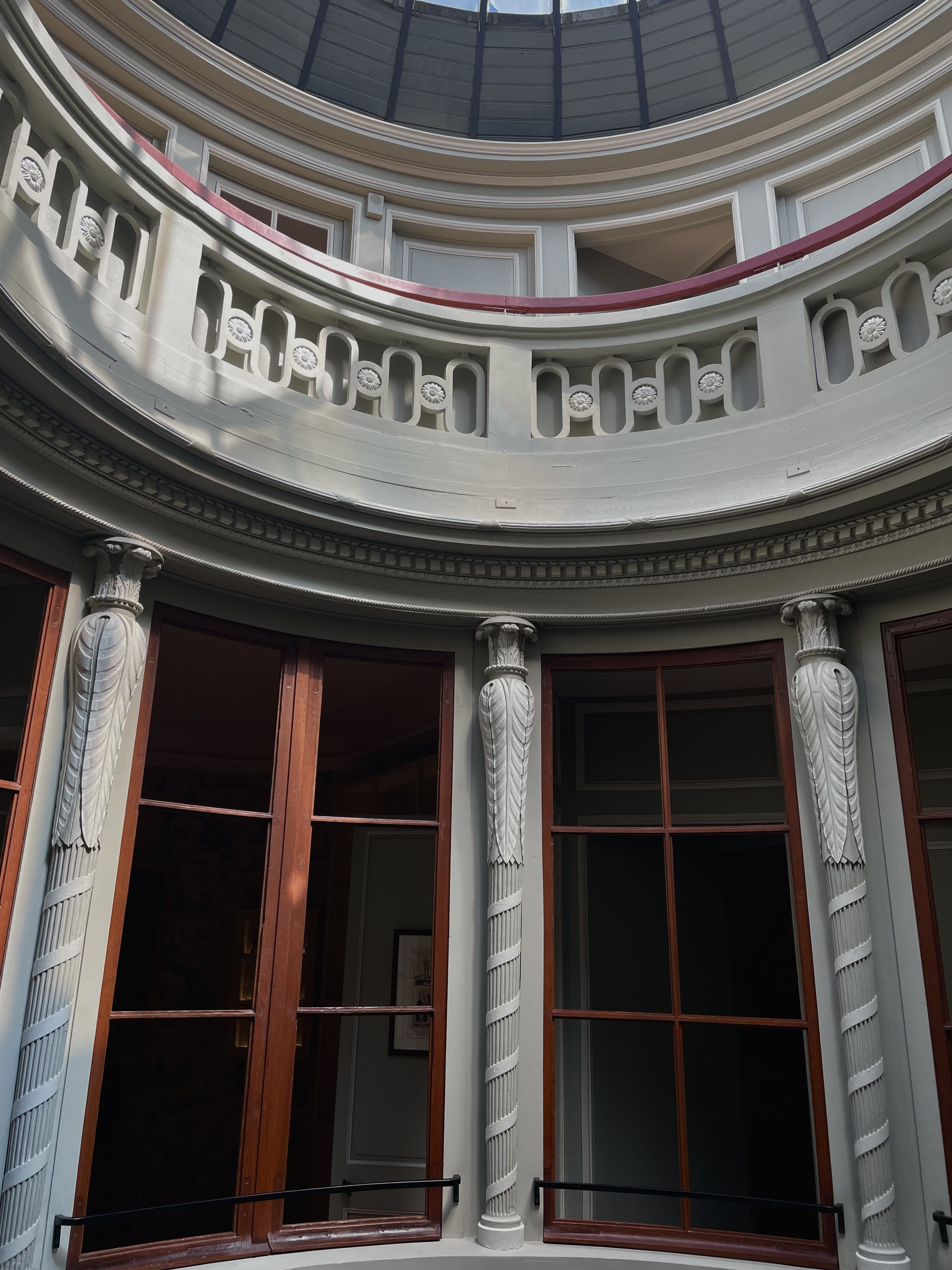
Close-up of the light well decorations

Since in the neighborhood where the building is situated, the urban layout was very dense, the architect had to find a way to distribute the light into the inner rooms which did not have windows; thus, he created a light well in the center of the house to enable the light to pass to darker rooms. The rooms on each floor are situated around an octagonal light well, which resembles a lighthouse. The light well is decorated on the inside with carved cornices between each floor as well as by Egyptian-style engaged columns which fill in the spaces between the windows on the fourth floor.

The interior was completed according to the "Pompeii" style.

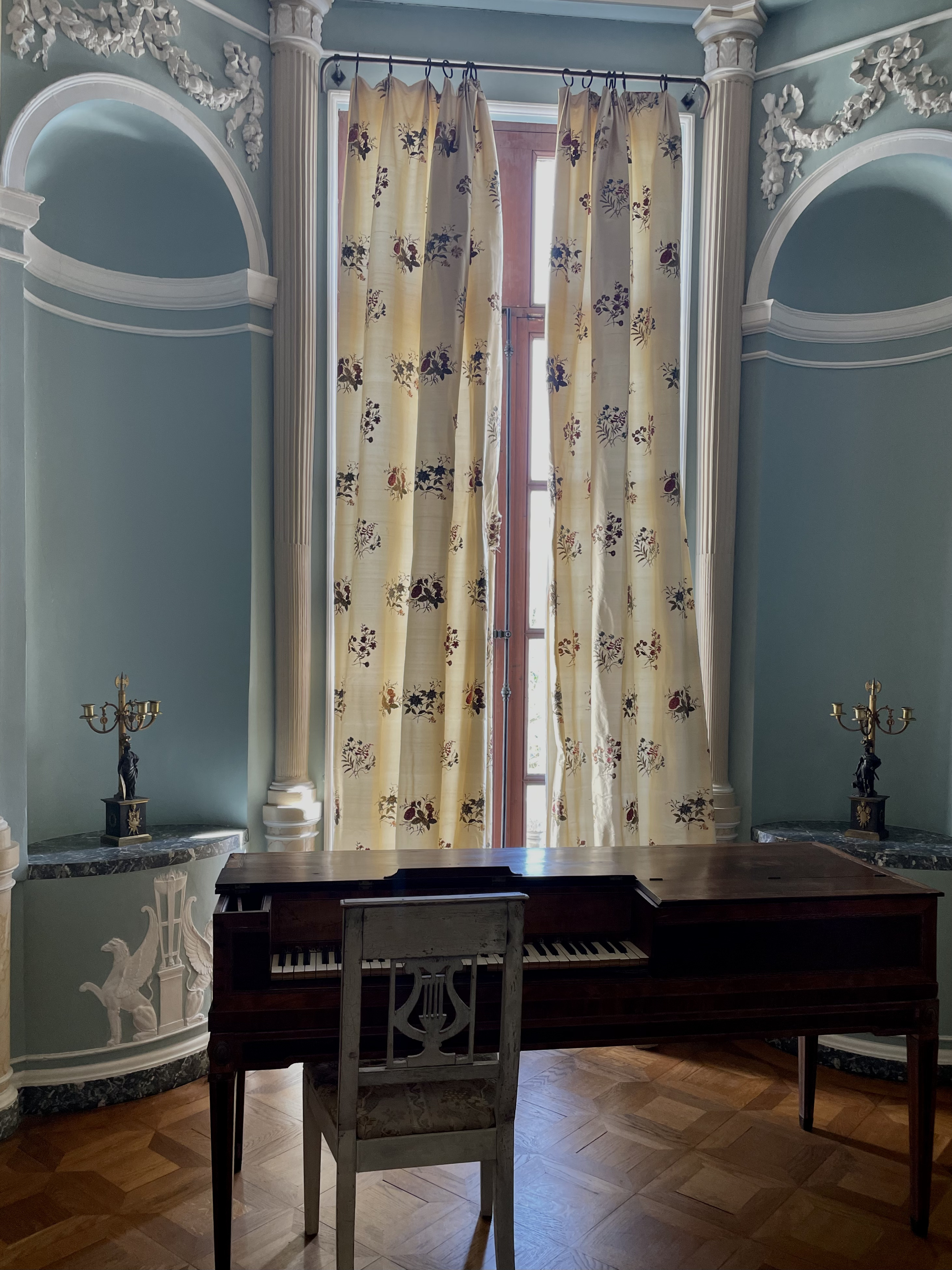
Interior design the Music Room

The music room can be taken as the main example with its ionic semi-columns, light blue color of the walls, bas-relief depicting four Greek nymphs symbolizing the four seasons, and a fortepiano, which was just becoming a new trend at that time. In fact, the authorship of Pâris was proved by the plannings for the music room based on the research conducted by Aline Lemonnier-Mercier.

Another peculiarity of the interior is the floor of the wife's bedroom, which is made out of different types of wood, comprising a beautiful mosaic pattern.

The decorations and furniture in the rooms creates the atmosphere of a wealthy bourgeois family of that time. The interior was not only serving the everyday needs and aesthetics; it was also supposed to show the prosperity and social status of the owners to the guests. The vocation of the owners is also underlined by the presence of exotic elements in the interior of some of the rooms, such as a stained-glass Chinese lantern and eastern fabric used for the drapery in the bedrooms. As the merchants of Le Havre were heavily involved in trade, these objects could possibly be used as interior decorations. In addition, as the architect built the fountains of Le Havre, he incorporated sole innovation into the structure of the building. For example, in the kitchen, there is a sink with a water evacuation system, which was a very rare element in the houses built at that time.

== Collection ==
The collections of the museum include portraits by Fragonard, landscapes, old maps, and glassware that recreate the lifestyle of rich merchants in the 18th century.

== Gallery ==
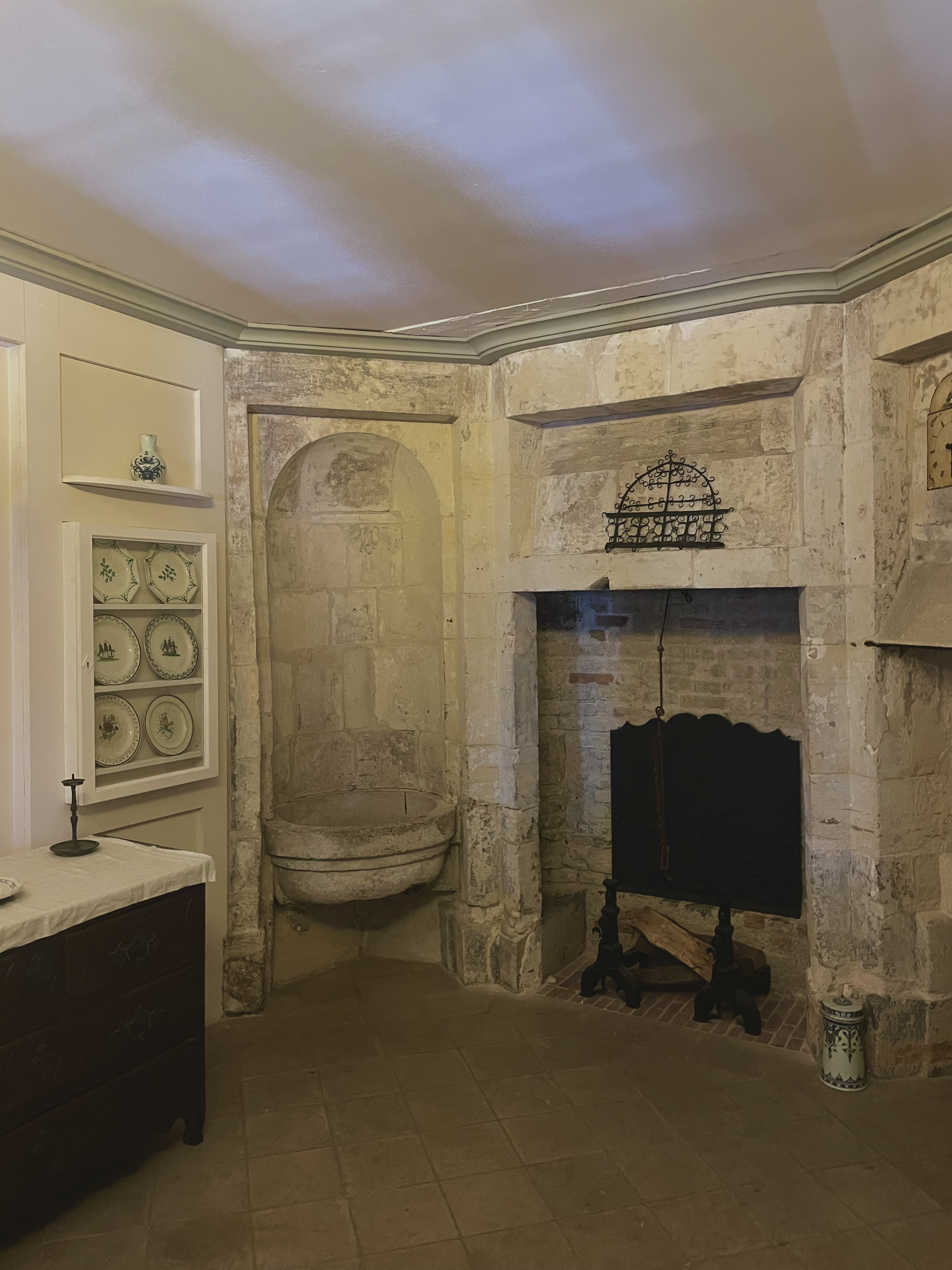
Interior design of the kitchen

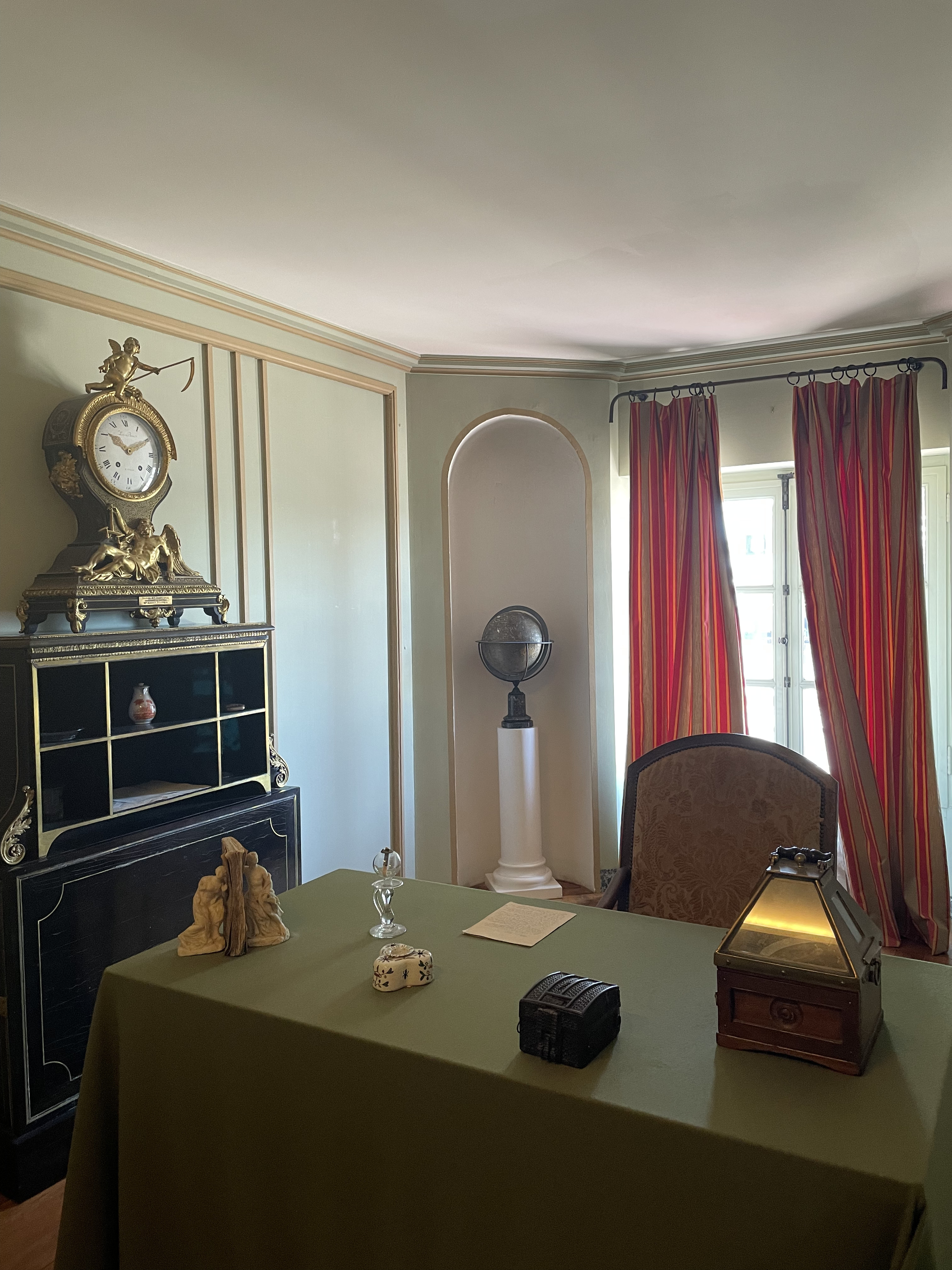
Interior design of the Study at the Ship Owner's House

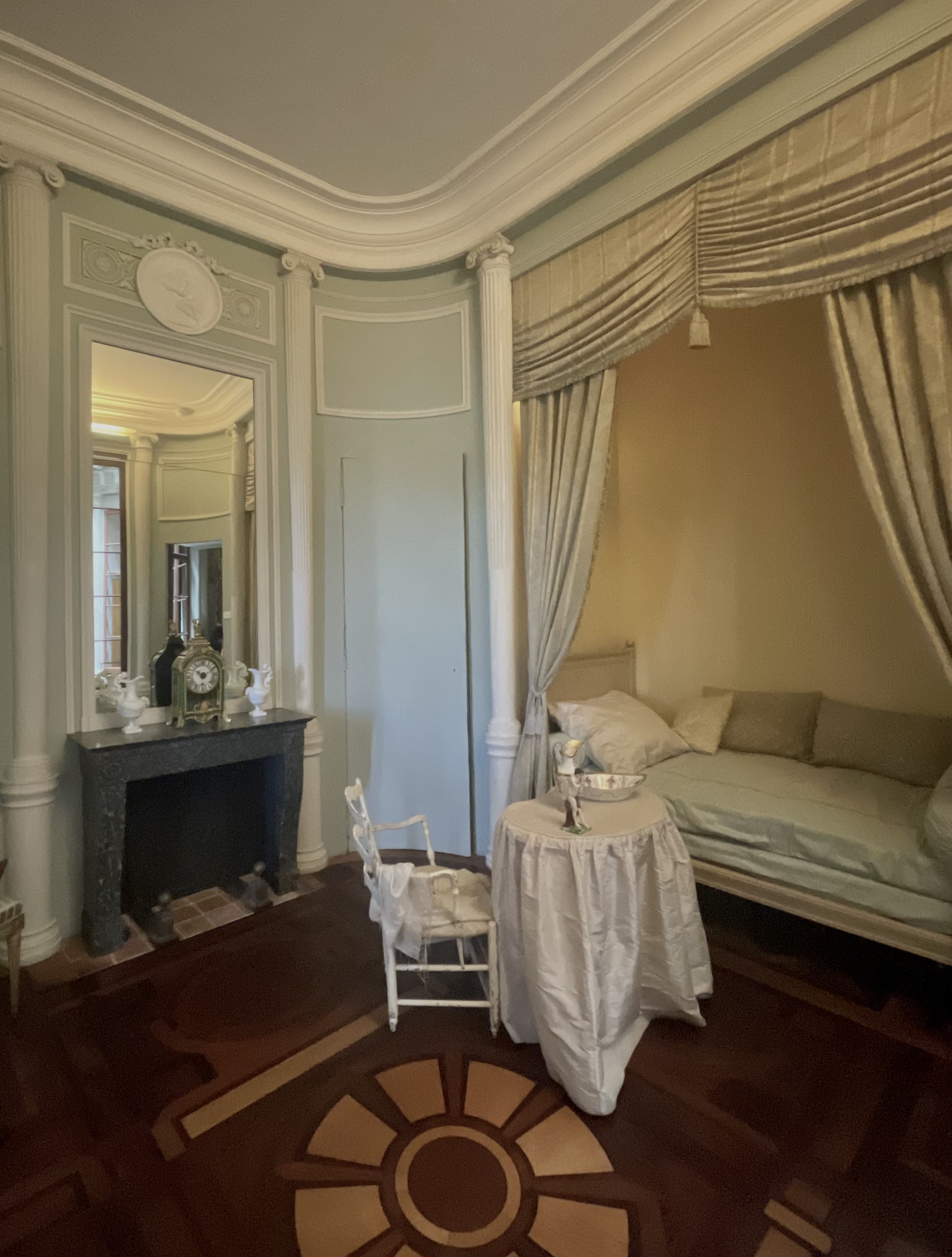
Interior of the Wife's bedroom

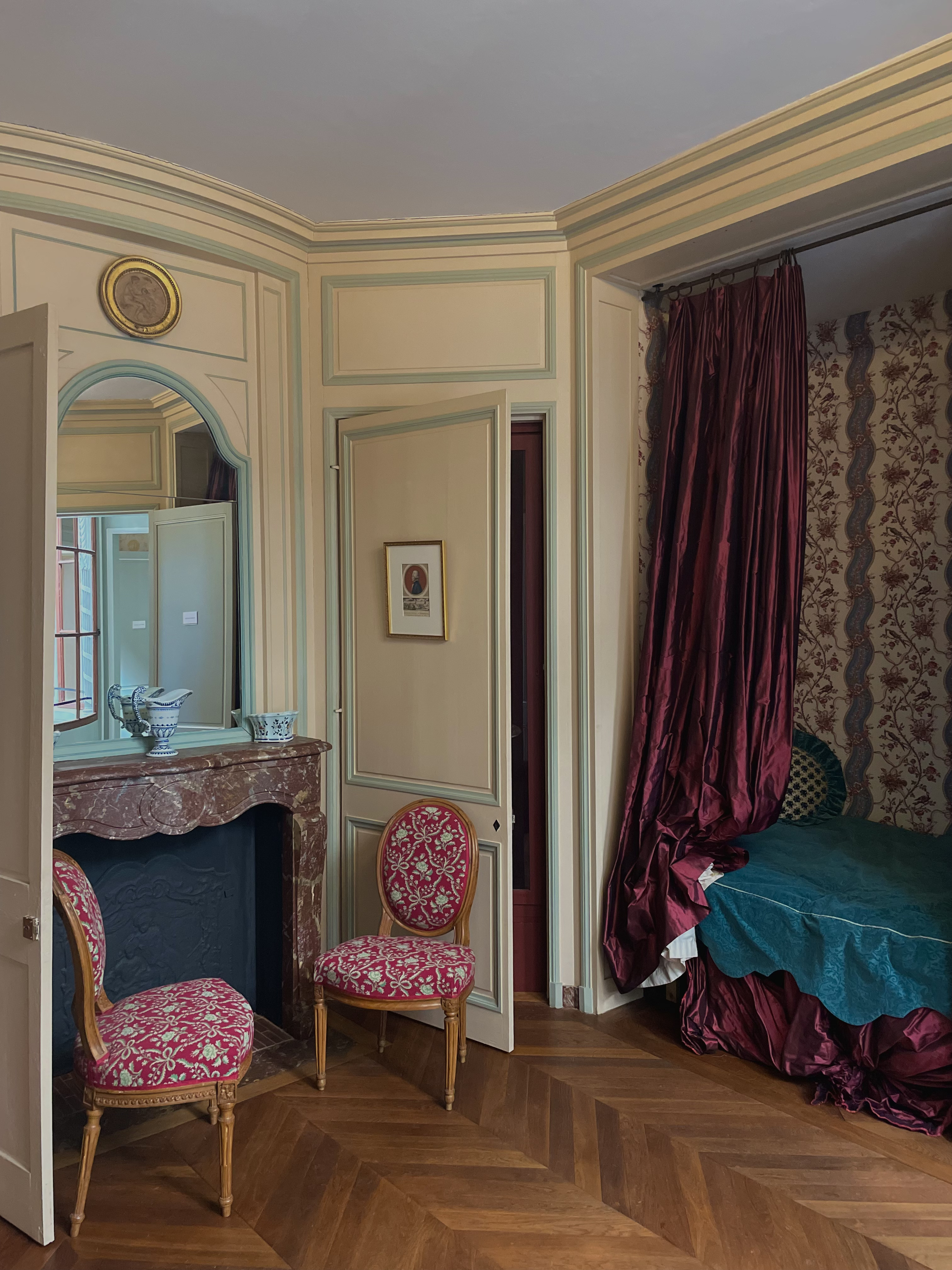
Interior of a bedroom at the Ship Owner's House

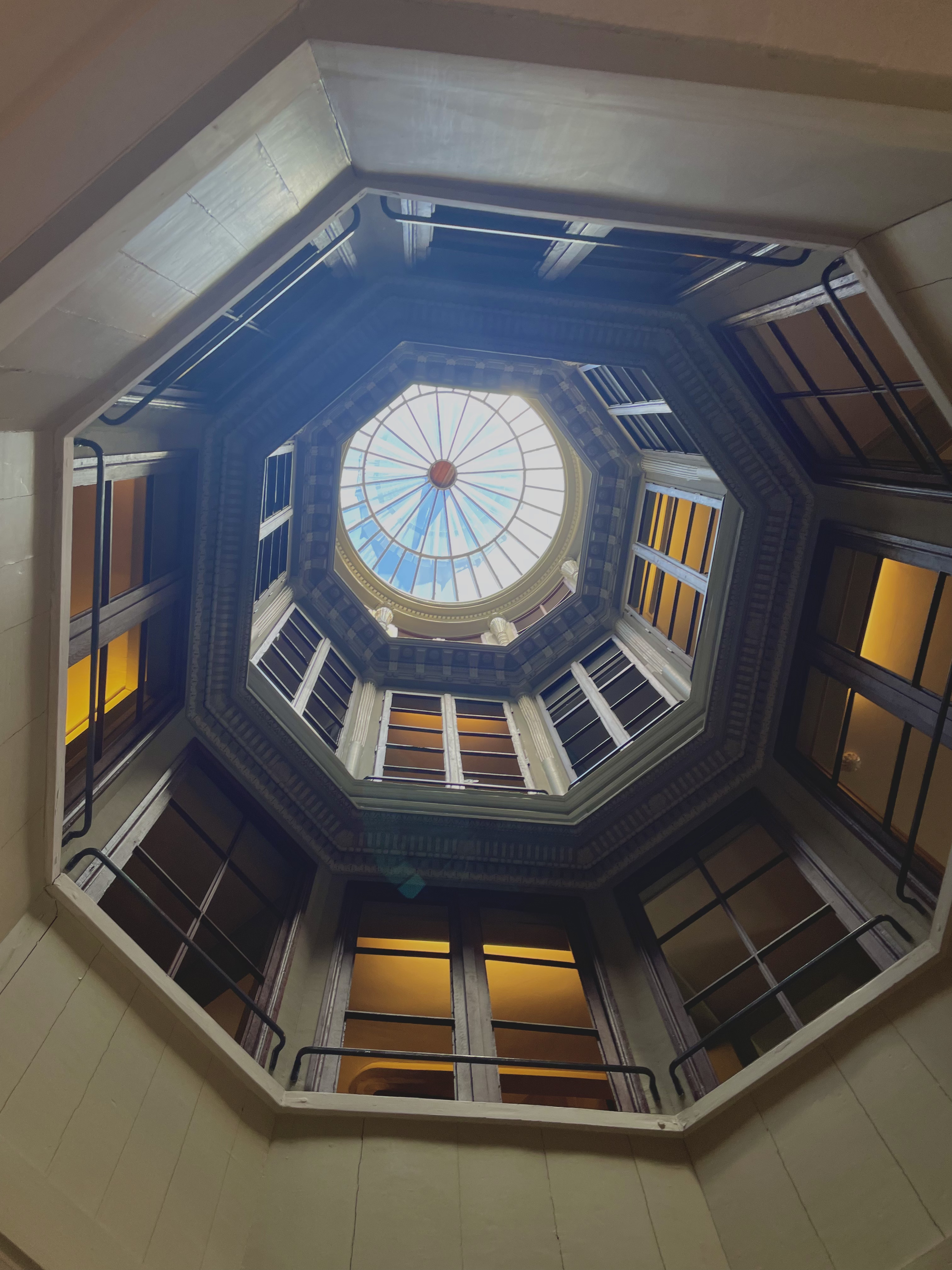
Light Well

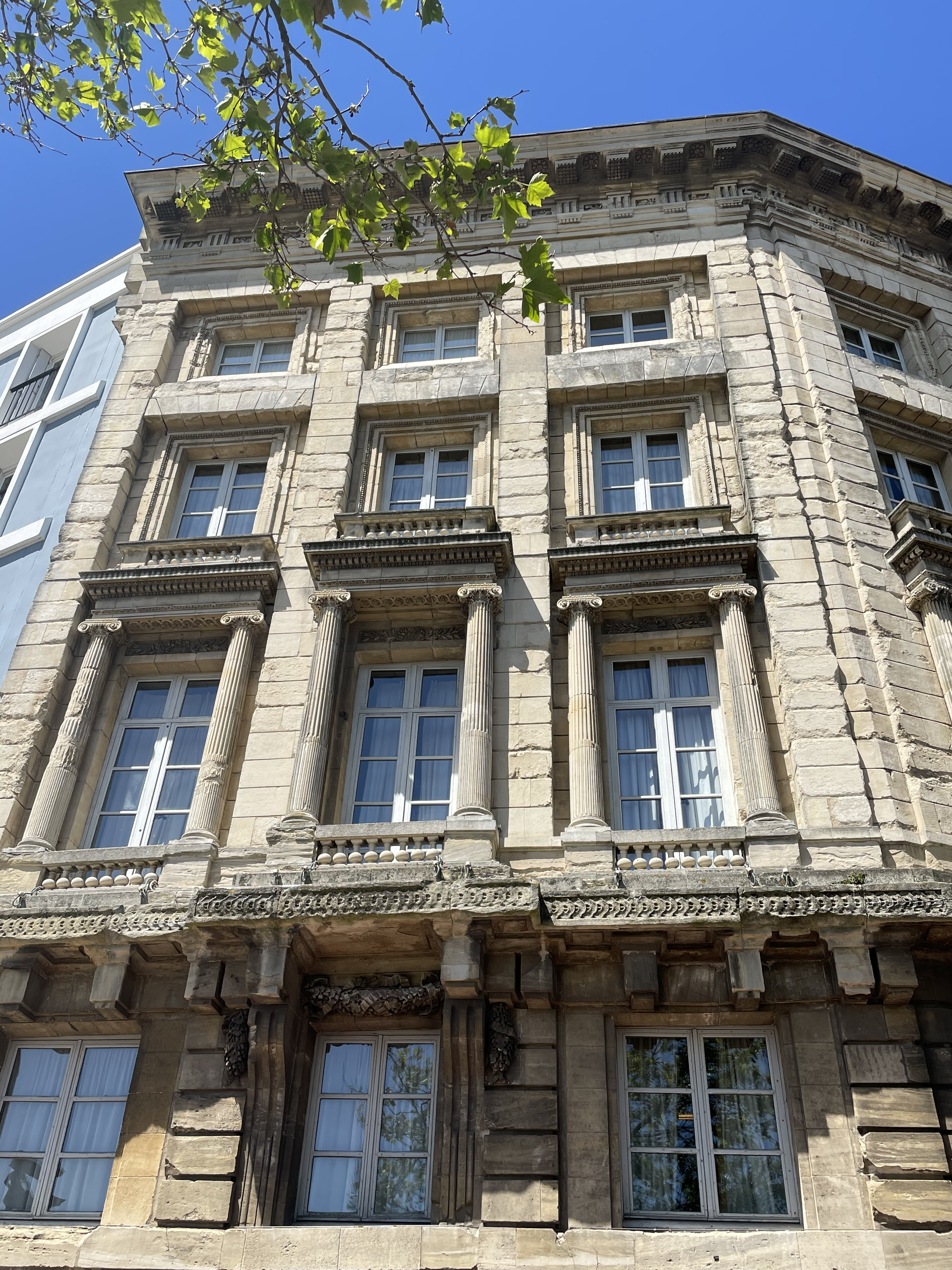
Close-up of the façade

== See also ==
- Hotel Dubocage de Bléville, another house of the Museum of Art and History of Le Havre
