= Hotel Dubocage de Bléville =

Museum in Le Havre, France

Coordinates: 49.48896038343728°N 0.11432275424930338°E

Hôtel Dubocage De Bléville
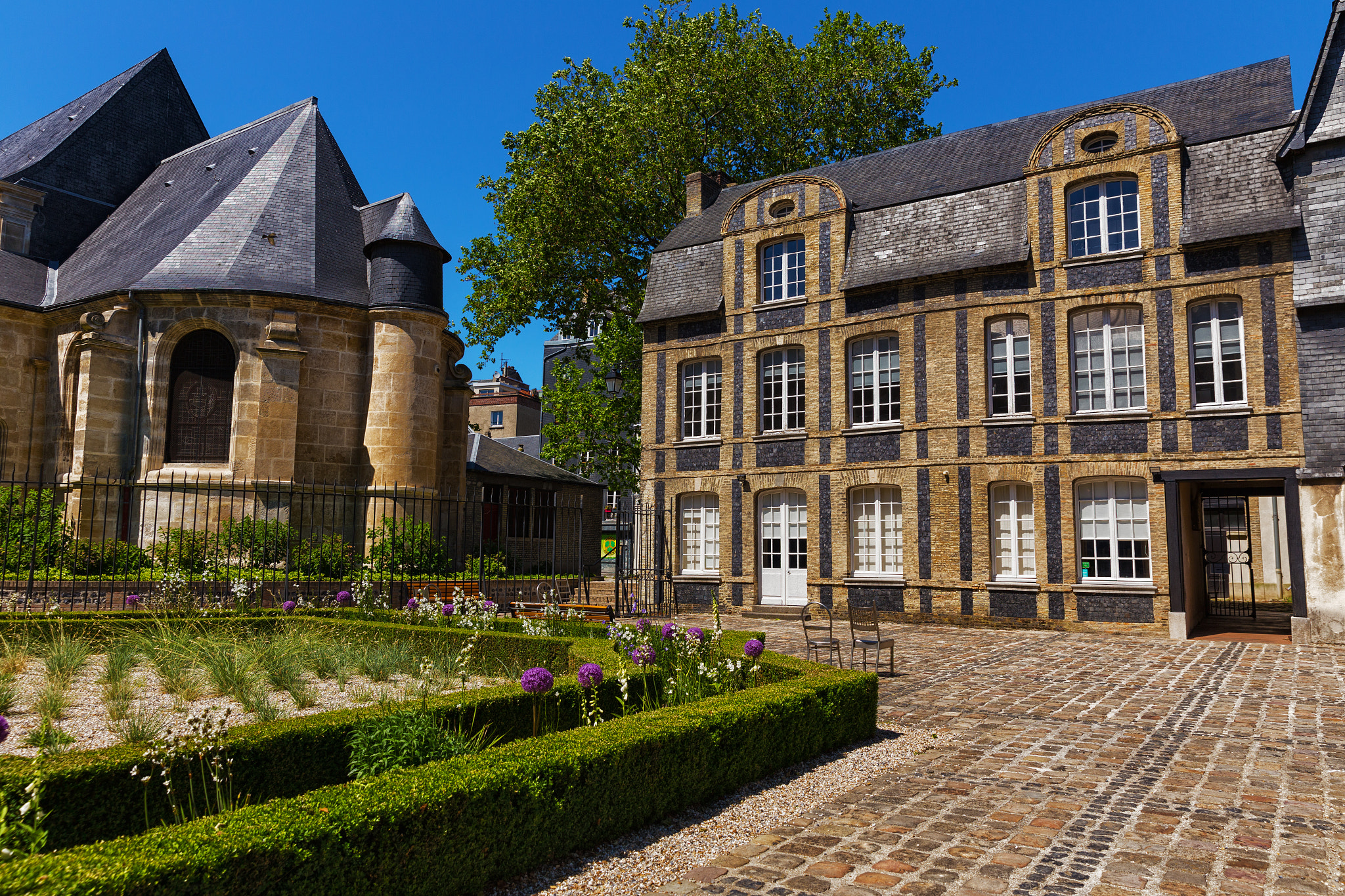
- Façade and a French garden at the Hôtel Dubocage de Bléville

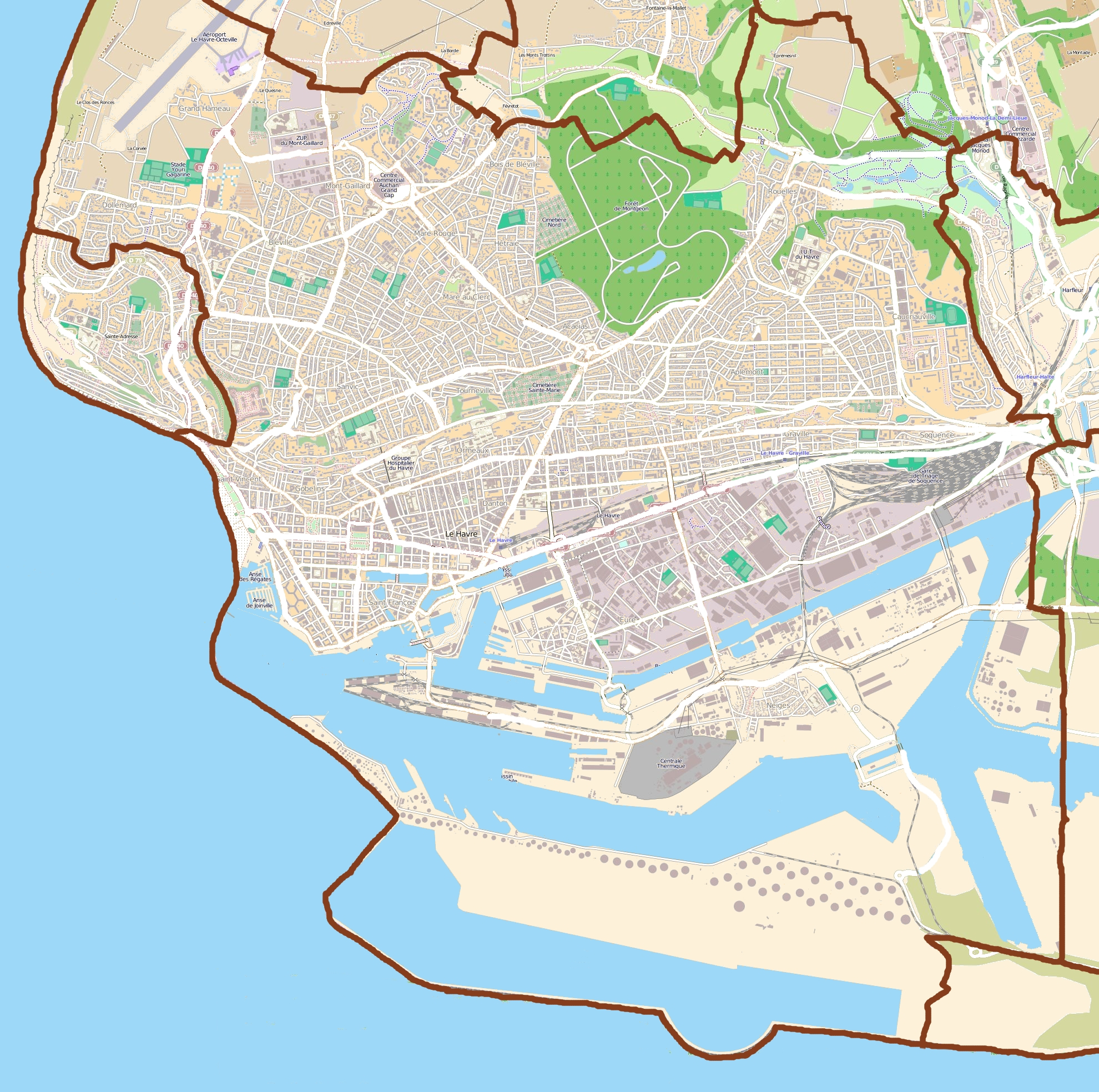
- Location in Le Havre
- Location: Le Havre, France
- Type: Historic Mansion
- Website: www.musee-mah-lehavre.fr

Hôtel Dubocage de Bléville (Note: The word "hôtel" in this case means hôtel particulier, a large urban mansion.) is a department of the museum of Art and History in Le Havre, Normandy, France. The architectural complex consists of two jointed houses built in the 17th and 18th century and a French garden. At the moment the museum mostly houses temporary exhibitions in the building.

== History ==
The name of the building originates from the family name of its most famous owner and his son, Michel Joseph Dubocage (1676–1727) and Michel Joseph Dubocage de Bléville (1707–1756). In 1706 Dubocage the Elder obtained the ownership of a couple small houses in the Saint-François district in Le Havre. He was a ship owner, a trader and a royal corsair. In 1716 he expanded his property in the district by purchasing some land with a few buildings and constructed a new house attached to the first one he owned. These two houses comprise the building of the museum nowadays. However, the name of the architects who built both of the parts are still unknown. The left part of the building was completed based on the financial rewards that the explorer received after the round-the-world voyage. Michel Joseph Dubocage was also known for exploring South America where he discovered Clipperton Island which was later claimed by France (on the basis of Dubocage's logbook where the discovery was described for the first time). The discovery of the island has contributed to the reinforcement of French economic presence in the region. Later Dubocage reached China where he signed the first Sino-French trade treaty. Upon his arrival back to France, he opened a shop behind his house. Later on the house was inherited by his son Michel Joseph Dubocage de Bléville who created a cabinet of curiosities since he was not only a trader but also a naturalist. In 1895 the building was divided into several properties and in 1919 it was bought by the city. During the Second World War the architectural complex was not damaged significantly. In 1946 the building was added to the list of historical monuments of Le Havre. The Museum of the Old Havre was situated in the building which was then renovated in 2009.

== Architecture ==
The half of the building on the right is the oldest part of the house. It was initially built with the usage of wooden bars which can still be observed on the sides of the building. The façade of the right part was tiled with slate. The left part of the building was completed during the time when it was owned by the Dubocage family and is made of yellow bricks and black flint.

Nowadays, most of the interiors have been renovated and serve as a space for exhibitions. The staircase in the right part of the building was added to the list of historical monuments of Le Havre. The French garden which is located in front of the building is one of the biggest and oldest gardens in the district of Saint-François.

== Collection ==
Even though the museum mostly holds temporary exhibitions, it also owns a permanent collection which include paintings (primarily portraits and landscapes), engravings, Chinese porcelain and glassware.

== Gallery ==
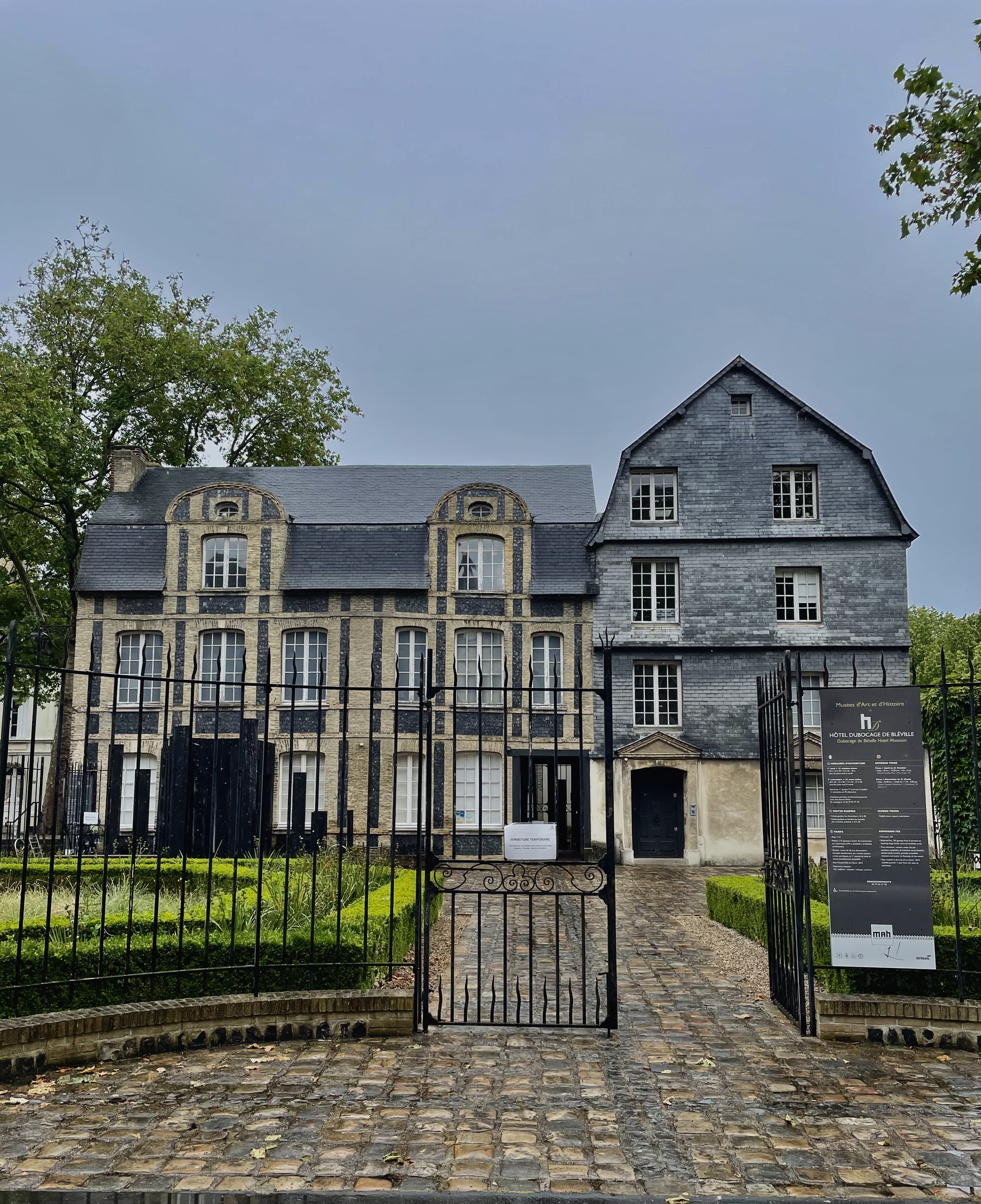
View of the façade of the Hotel

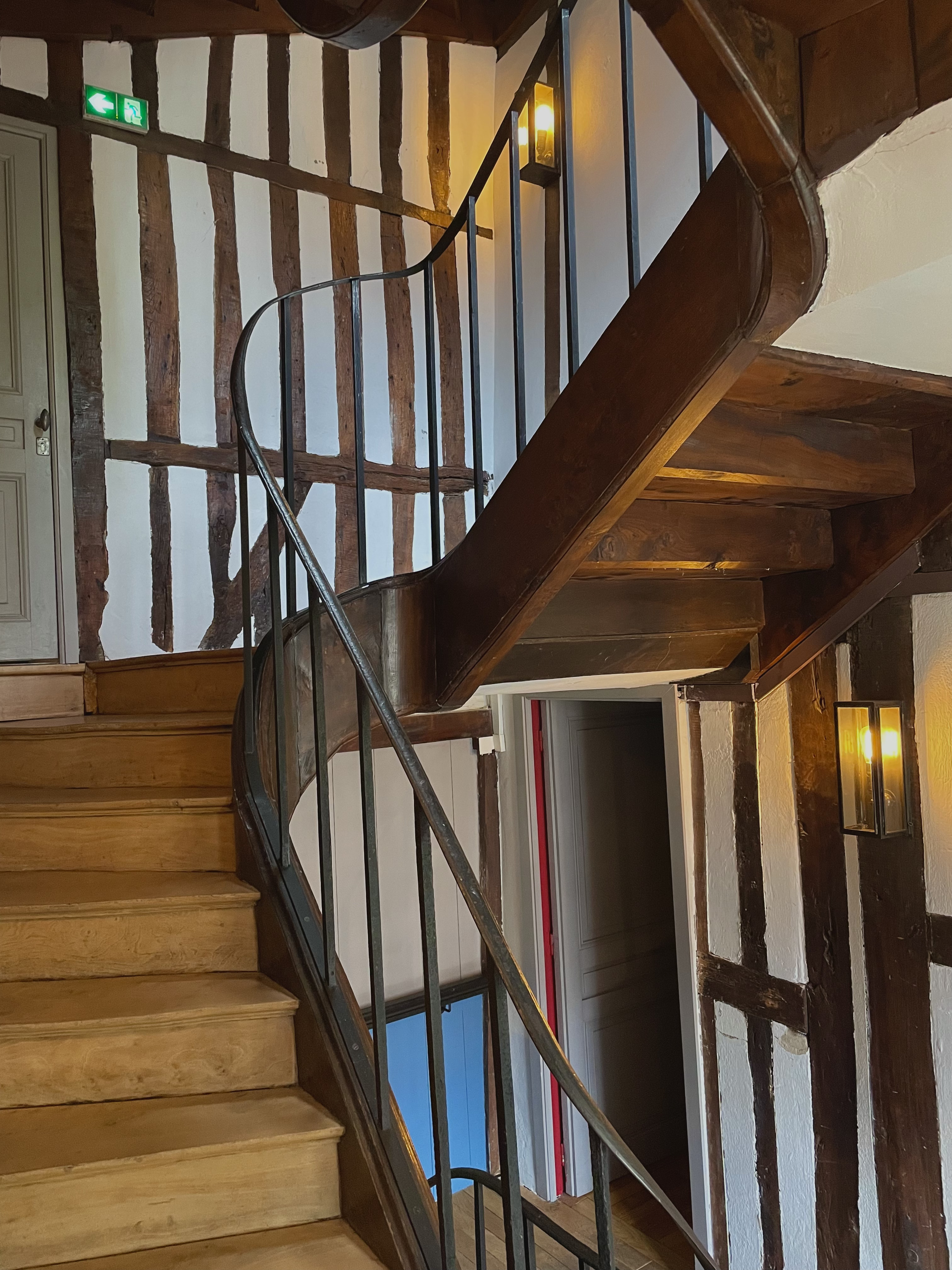
View of the interior staircase

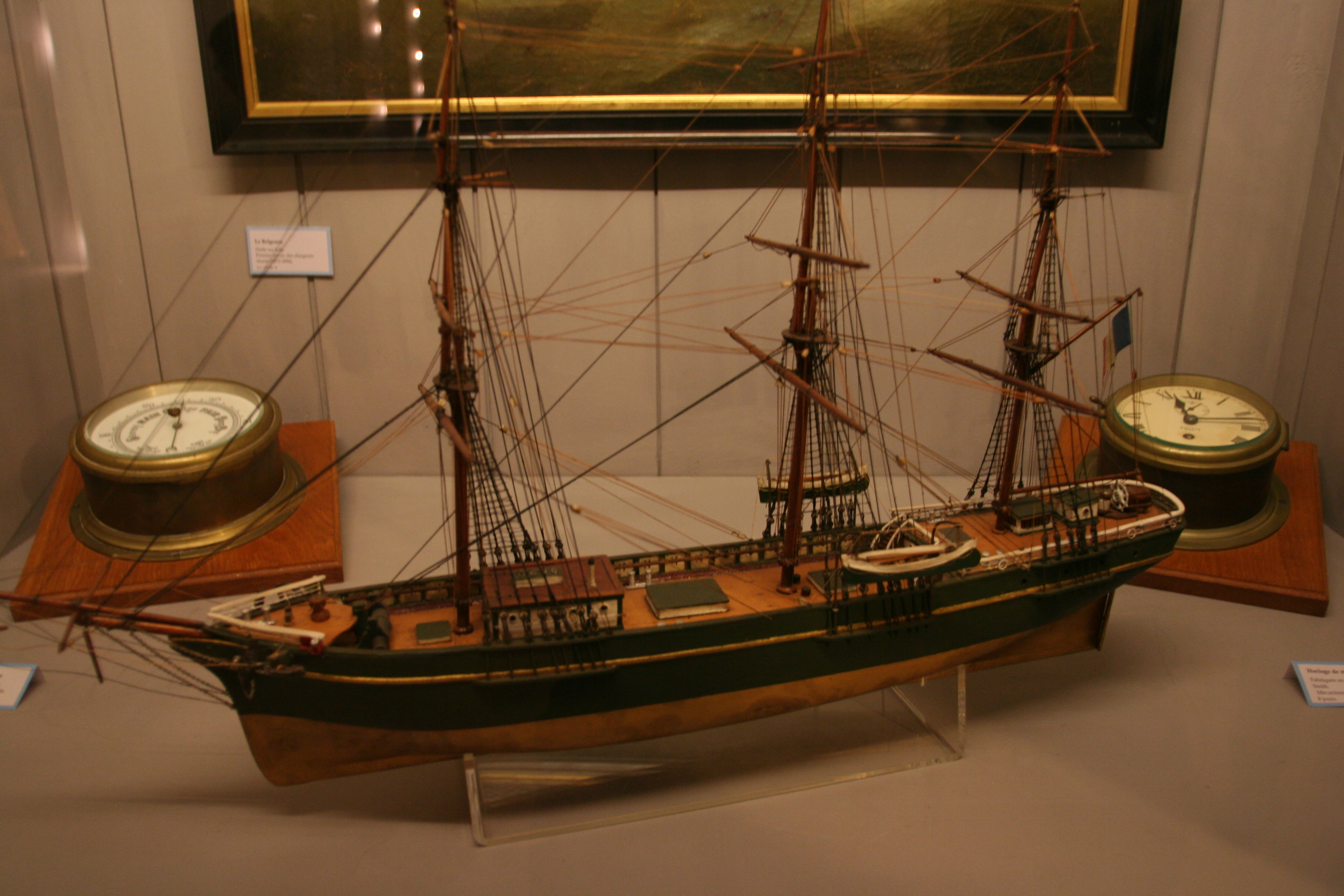
Maritime Collections

== See also ==
- Maison de l'armateur of Le Havre, another house of the Museum of Art and History of Le Havre

== Bibliography ==
- Inventaire général du patrimoine culturel. (1991). Hôtel Dubocage de Bléville puis Maison de Veuves, puis Musée de l’Ancien Havre (No. IA00130204).
- Carli, F. (2018). Le Havre, petite histoire de l’architecture. Paris: Editions du Cardo.
- Cochard, N. (2016). Les marins du Havre. Rennes : Presses universitaires de Rennes.
