= List of people from Cluj-Napoca =

This is a list of people from Cluj-Napoca, Romania.

== Natives ==
- Otto Adler (1929–2014), president of the Jewish Association of Romania
- Alexandru Agache (1955–), operatic baritone
- Egon Balas (1922–2019), mathematician, professor at Carnegie Mellon University
- Edith Balas (1929–2024), art historian, professor at Carnegie Mellon University
- Oana Ban (1986–), Olympic gymnast and gold medalist (2004)
- Dezső Bánffy (1843–1911), Prime Minister of Hungary (1895–1899)
- Miklós Bánffy (1873–1950), nobleman, novelist, Foreign Minister of Hungary (1921–1922)
- Stephen Bocskay (1557–1606), Calvinist nobleman, Prince of Transylvania (1605–1606)
- Ádám Bodor (1936–), author
- János Bolyai (1802–1860), mathematician
- Rada Mihalcea, Computer Scientist and Professor at the University of Michigan, Ann Arbor
- Coralia Cartis, mathematician
- Ruxandra Cesereanu (1963–), poet, writer and literary critic
- Matthias Corvinus (1443–1490), King of Hungary and Croatia (1458–1490)
- Flaviu Cristian (1951–1999), Romanian-American computer scientist
- Ferenc Dávid (c. 1510–1579), preacher, founder of the Unitarian Church of Transylvania
- Tissa David (1921–2012), animator
- Péter Eckstein-Kovács (1956–), lawyer and politician
- Agnes Esterhazy (1898–1956), film actress
- Magda Frank (1914–2010), sculptor
- Mihai Gavrilă (1929–), quantum physicist
- Bela Gold (1915–2012), American academic
- Ionel Haiduc (1937–), chemist, President of the Romanian Academy (2006–2014)
- Michael Halász (1938–), classical conductor
- Gabriella and Monica Irimia (1982–), singers known as The Cheeky Girls
- Emil Isac (1886–1954), poet, playwright and critic
- Dezső Kalinovszky (1933–2009), writer
- Béla Károlyi (1942–2024), gymnastics coach
- Rudolf Kastner (1906–1957), Zionist activist, journalist and lawyer
- Irina Lăzăreanu (1982–), model and folk singer
- János Martonyi (1944–), politician, Foreign Minister of Hungary (1998–2002; 2010–2014)
- Elena Moldovan Popoviciu (1924–2009), mathematician
- Ibrahim Muteferrika (1674–1745), Ottoman diplomat, printer and historian
- Ion Negoițescu (1921–1993), literary critic and memoirist
- Adrian Papahagi (1976–), medievalist and politician
- Sergiu P. Pașca (1982–), neuroscientist
- Florin Piersic (1936–), theater and film actor
- Sándor Reményik (1890–1941), poet
- Rudolph von Ripper (1905–1960), artist and soldier
- Daniela L. Rus (1963–), American computer scientist
- Lívia Rusz (1930–2020), graphic artist
- Heinrich Schönfeld (born 1900), Austrian football player
- István Szamosközy (1570–1612), historian
- László Tőkés (1952–), Calvinist bishop, 1989 revolutionary, politician
- Sándor Végh (1912–1997), violinist and conductor
- Abraham Wald (1902–1950), mathematician

== Inhabitants ==
- Endre Ady (1877–1919), poet
- Ion Agârbiceanu (1882–1963), novelist
- Bartolomeu Anania (1921–2011), Orthodox bishop
- Lucian Blaga (1895–1961), poet and philosopher
- Nicolae Bocșan (1947–2016), historian, rector of Babeș-Bolyai University (2004–2008)
- Alexandru Borza (1887–1971), botanist, founder of the Cluj-Napoca Botanical Garden
- Corneliu Coposu (1914–1995), founder of the Christian Democratic National Peasants' Party, anti-communist political prisoner
- Doina Cornea (1929–2018), dissident
- Constantin Daicoviciu (1898–1973), historian, rector of Babeș-Bolyai University (1956–1968)
- Horia Demian (1942–1989), basketball player
- Gheorghe Funar (1949–), mayor of Cluj-Napoca (1992–2004)
- Onisifor Ghibu (1883–1972), teacher of pedagogy and politician
- Yekusiel Yehudah Halberstam (1905–1994), Orthodox Jewish rabbi
- Emil Hațieganu (1878–1959), politician and jurist
- Iuliu Hațieganu (1885–1959), doctor, tuberculosis researcher
- Iuliu Hossu (1885–1970), Greek-Catholic bishop, political prisoner
- Antal Kagerbauer (1814–1872), architect
- Olga Lengyel (1908–2001), Auschwitz prisoner, memoirist
- Scott Long (1963–), lesbian, gay, bisexual, and transgender activist
- Ioan Lupaș (1880–1967), historian, politician and Orthodox priest
- Augustin Maior (1882–1963), physicist, educator and inventor
- Iuliu Maniu (1873–1953), politician, three times Prime Minister of Romania (1928–1933)
- Andrei Marga (1946–), political scientist and politician, rector of Babeș-Bolyai University (1993–2004, 2008–2012)
- Dorinel Munteanu (1968–), football player and manager
- Gheorghe Mureșan (1971–), basketball player
- Ioan Gyuri Pascu (1961–2016), pop singer, actor and comedian
- Emil Racoviță (1868–1947), biologist and explorer of Antarctica
- Ion Rațiu (1917–2000), politician and exile activist
- Raluca Ripan (1894–1972), chemist, rector of Babeș-Bolyai University (1951–1956)
- Dumitru D. Roșca (1895–1980), philosopher and professor
- Ioan Sabău (1968–), football player
- Emil Simon (1936–2014), conductor and composer
- Raoul Șorban (1912–2006), painter, writer and academic
- Cornel Todea (1935–2012), theater and film director
- Alexandru Vaida-Voevod (1872–1950), politician, Prime Minister of Romania (1919–1920)
