= Ciorbea cabinet =

Ciorbea I
- 112th Cabinet of Romania
- Date formed: 12 December 1996
- Date dissolved: 30 March 1998

People and organisations
- Head of state: Emil Constantinescu
- Head of government: Victor Ciorbea
- Head of government's history: Gavril Dejeu (interim)
- Member party: PNȚ-CD, PNL, PD, UDMR, PSDR
- Status in legislature: Majority
- Opposition party: PDSR, PRM
- Opposition leader: Oliviu Gherman/Ion Iliescu, Corneliu Vadim Tudor

History
- Election: 26 November 1996
- Outgoing election: -
- Legislature term: 1996–2000
- Budget: Two
- Predecessor: Văcăroiu
- Successor: Vasile

The Ciorbea Cabinet was the 112th cabinet of Romania, formed 12 December 1996 and dissolved 30 March 1998, with Victor Ciorbea as head of government. It was a coalition cabinet formed between the winner of the elections, CDR (Convenția Democrată Română, the Romanian Democratic Convention, which included PNȚCD, PNL, PER), USD (Uniunea Social Democrată, the Social Democratic Union, which included PD and PSDR), and UDMR.

== Members ==
Prime Minister:

- Victor Ciorbea (PNT-CD)

Ministers of State:

- Mircea Ciumara (PNT-CD)
- Ulm Spineanu (PNT-CD)
- Gavril Dejeu (PNT-CD)
- Adrian Severin (PD)
- Victor Babiuc (PD)
- Călin Popescu-Tăriceanu (PNL)
- Valeriu Stoica (PNL)
- Alexandru Athanasiu (PSDR)

Ministers:

- Valeriu Stoica (PNL) (Justice)
- Victor Babiuc (PD) Constantin Dudu Ionescu (PNT-CD) (Defense)
- Mircea Ciumara (PNT-CD)/Daniel Dăianu (Independent minister) (Finance)
- Ion Caramitru (PNT-CD) (Culture)
- Nicolae Noica (PNT-CD) (Public Works)
- Dinu Gavrilescu (PNT-CD) (Agriculture)
- Ștefan Iosif Drăgulescu (PNT-CD)/Ion Victor Bruckner (Independent Minister) (Health)
- Adrian Severin (PD)/Andrei Pleșu (Independent Minister) (Foreign Affairs)
- Călin Popescu-Tăriceanu (PNL)/ Mircea Ciumara (Industry and Commerce)
- Alexandru Athanasiu (PSDR) (Labor)
- Sorin Pantiș (PNL) (Communications)
- Ioan Oltean (PD)/Sorin Frunzăverde (PD)/Romică Tomescu (PNT-CD) (Environment)
- Traian Băsescu (PD)/Anton Ionescu(PNL) (Transport)
- Gavril Dejeu (PNT-CD) (Interior)
- Virgil Petrescu (PNT-CD)/Andrei Marga (Independent Minister) (Education)
- Ulm Spineanu(PNT-CD)/Ilie Șerbănescu(Independent Minister)(Reform)
- Bujor Bogdan Teodoriu (Independent Minister) /Horia Ene(Independent Minister) (Research and Technology)
- Mihai-Sorin Stănescu (PNL)/Crin Antonescu(PNL) (Youth and Sport)
- Bogdan Niculescu-Duvăz (PD)/Ioan Mureșan(PNT-CD) (Relation with Parliament)
- Ákos Birtalan (UDMR) (Tourism)

Minister-Delegates:

- Alexandru Herlea (PNT-CD) (European Integration)
- Remus Opriș (PNT-CD) (Local Administration)
- Valentin Ionescu (PNL) (Privatization)
- Radu Boroianu (PNL) /Sorin-Mircea Bottez (PNL) (Public Information)
- György Tokay (UDMR) (National Minorities)
