= Renate Weber =

Romanian politician

Renate Weber MEP
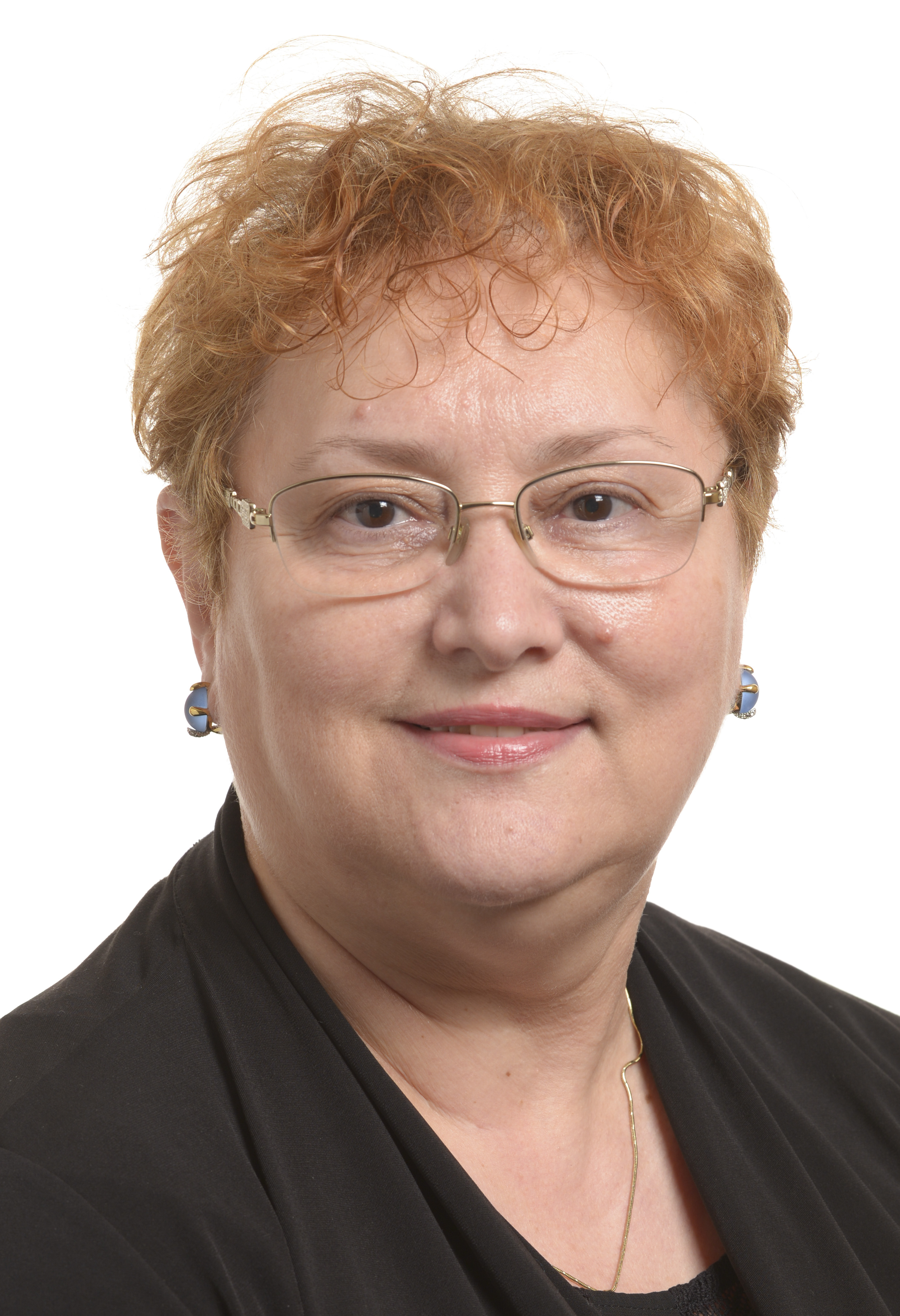

Member of the European Parliament for Romania
- In office November 2007 – May 2019

Advisor on constitutional and legislative matters to the President of Romania
- In office December 2004 – 2005
- President: Traian Băsescu
- Prime Minister: Călin Popescu-Tăriceanu

Ombudsman
- Incumbent
- Assumed office 26 June 2019
- Preceded by: Victor Ciorbea

Personal details
- Born: 3 August 1955 (age 71) Botoșani, Suceava Region, Romanian People's Republic
- Party: Alliance of Liberals and Democrats (ALDE)
- Profession: Lawyer

Renate Weber (born 3 August 1955 in Botoșani, Botoșani County, Romania) is a Romanian lawyer and human rights activist who, in November 2007, was elected as Member of the European Parliament. She is the first Romanian appointed as Chief of an EU Election Observation Mission. Between 2004–2005 she was Advisor on constitutional and legislative matters to then President of Romania, Traian Băsescu. She previously served as the Romanian Ombudsman as well from June 2019 until mid June 2021.

== Biography ==
Renate Weber graduated from the Law Faculty of the University of Bucharest, in 1979 and became a lawyer at the Bucharest Bar.

In the 1990s, Weber has become one of the strongest voices of the Romanian civil society, being involved in a number of national and international non-profit organization, such as the International Helsinki Federation for Human Rights (Vienna), where she was Vice-chair (1994–1996), or the Association for the Protection of Human Rights in Romania – Helsinki Committee (APADOR-CH), where she was Co-chair (1994–1999). Weber was the longest-serving Chairwoman of the National Council at the Foundation for an Open Society – Romania (1998–2005, 2006–2007).

In 2000, she was appointed as Ad hoc judge at the European Court of Human Rights in (Strasbourg).

She lectured in international human rights law, constitutional law, minority rights and women's rights, at the National School of Political and Administrative Studies, Faculty of Political Sciences (1997–2003). She also held classes on the protection of human rights in the context of international relations, at University of Bucharest, Faculty of History (2003–2004).

Between 2004–2005, Weber was appointed as Advisor on constitutional and legislative matters to the President of Romania.

In 2007, she decided to enter politics and became a member of the National Liberal Party (PNL).

== European Parliament activity ==
Renate Weber became a member of the European Parliament in November 2007. She is a full member of the LIBE Committee and a substitute member of the AFET Committee.

She was also a member of the Delegation for relations with the countries of the Andean Community. In this capacity, she led – in the autumn of 2008 – the EP Electoral Observation Mission in Ecuador.

Subsequently, she was appointed by the European Commission as Chief of the EU Election Observation Mission for the 25 January 2009 Constitutional Referendum in Bolivia and she was also Chief Observer for the EU EOM deployed for the presidential and legislative elections that took place in Bolivia on 6 December 2009.

In May 2010, Renate Weber was invited by the European Commission to lead the EU EOM deployed for the May–September 2010 electoral cycle in Burundi, Africa.

== Ombudsperson of Romania ==
In June 2019, Weber was appointed as People's Advocate of Romania by the Parliament of Romania. As a consequence, in accordance with law, she had to resign from her European Parliament membership. She was ousted by Parliament in mid June 2021. Her dismissal was declared unconstitutional by the Romanian Constitutional Court on 29 June, and she was reinstated in her position on 6 July 2021.

== Other activities ==
- Organisation and lecturing, course in 'Rights of national minorities' (UNDP and Centre for Human Rights, Moldova, 2000);
- Organisation and lecturing, course (training of trainers) in 'The police and human rights' (UNDP and Centre for Human Rights, Moldova, 2000);
- Lecturer, 'The police and the European Convention on Human Rights', Police Academy, organised by the Council of Europe (Moscow, 2000);
- Lecturer, 'Joint Pilot Training Course for Human Rights Field Missions', organised by the Organization for Security and Co-operation in Europe, the Council of Europe, the UN and the EU (Venice, 1999);
- Member, Reflection Group on the project 'The Long-term Implications of EU Enlargement: The Nature of the New Border', formed by the European Commission and the Robert Schuman Centre of the European University Institute (Florence, 1998–1999);
- Lecturer on more than 15 courses held in the Netherlands, Austria, Albania, Slovakia, Russia, Kirghizstan, and Kazakhstan on human rights monitoring, especially as regards the relationship between international law and national legislation, in connection with the work of the police, prison conditions, the organisation and conduct of elections, freedom of expression, minority rights and women's rights (1993–1998).

== Articles, studies, books ==
Weber has over 50 published studies and articles on human rights, the rights of national minorities, constitutional law, the European Convention on Human Rights and fighting discrimination. Here are several examples:

- Synthesis of the national situation in Romania (anti-discrimination report produced for the European Commission, 2006);
- The Kin-State and Its Minorities: Which European Standards? The Hungarian Status- Law : Its Antecedents and Consequences, in The Hungarian Status Law: Nation Building and/or Minority Protection, Zoltan Kantor and others eds., Slavic Eurasian Studies, Vol. 4, Slavic Research Center, Hokkaido University, Sapporo, 2004;
- "Non-Discrimination Review" – project undertaken by the Council of Europe, addressing non-discrimination issues within the Central and South East Europe – member of the three country group expert team 2002–2003;
- "Report on Measures to Combat Discrimination in the 13 candidate countries" – project undertaken by MEDE European Consultancy in partnership with Migration Policy Group – country report on Romania, 2003;
- "Concept paper on Combating Discrimination in Romania. An Inventory of Problems on Legislation and Institutional Mechanisms for Combating Discrimination" – a follow-up project within the Non Discrimination Review project of the Council of Europe, 2003
- "The Romanian Constitutional Court: In Search of its Own Identity" in Sadurski Wojciech ed. Constitutional Justice, East and West – Democratic Legitimacy and Constitutional Courts in Post-Communist Europe in A Comparative Perspective, Kluwer Law International, The Hague-London-New York, 2002;
- "The Impact of the European Convention of Human Rights upon the Rule of Law in Romania", Blackburn and Polakiewicz (eds.), Oxford University Press, 2002;
- Research on "National and European Legislation to Combat Racism", project undertaken by Migration Policy Group, Interrights and European Roma Rights Center, report on Romania, 2001;
- "The Effect of the [ECHR] on the Legal and Political System of Member States: Romania", in Prof. Robert Blackburn and Dr. Jorg Polakiewicz eds. Fundamental Rights in Europe – The European Convention on Human Rights and its Member States, 1950–2000, Oxford University Press, 2001
- "Constitutionalism as a Vehicle for Democratic Consolidation in Romania", in Jan Zielonka ed. Democratic Consolidation in Eastern Europe, Oxford University Press, 2001;
- "Police Organization and Accountability: A Comparative Study", in Andras Kadar ed. Police in Transition, Central European University Press, 2001;
- Women 2000 – An Investigation into the Status of Women's Rights in Central and South-Eastern Europe and the Newly Independent States, editor, International Helsinki Federation for Human Rights, Vienna, 2000;
- "Transylvania: evolution through devolution?" in The Transilvanian Problem (Problema transilvană), Polirom, Iași, 1999
- "The Romanian-Hungarian Relations within the Legal Frame of the Schengen Agreements, in the review International Studies", Centre for International Studies, Bucharest, 1999 (published also in Hungarian, in Europai Szemmel, Budapest, 1999);
- "The Moldavian Csango", (in co-operation), International Foundation for Promoting Studies and Knowledge of Minority Rights, Budapest, 1998;
- "The Protection of National Minorities in Romania: a Matter of Political Will and Wisdom", in Law and Practice of Central European Countries in the Field of National Minorities Protection, Institute for International Affairs, Warsaw, 1997;
- "Three minorities and their claims: the Hungarian from Romania, the Romanian from Ukraine and the Gagauz from Moldova", in Altera, no.6/1997;
- "Self-determination", study prepared with the Bucharest Centre for Human Rights for the Committee on Political Affairs of the Council of Europe, 1996;
- "Romania and International Human Rights" – chapter for the Romanian version of Thomas Buergenthal's book International Human Rights – in a nutshell, All, Bucharest, 1996;
- "Evolutions in the D.A.H.R. Conception on Hungarian Minority Rights" (in co-operation), Centre for Human Rights, Bucharest, 1996;
- "The White Paper on Access to Information in Romania" (in co-operation), Centre for Human Rights, Bucharest, 1996;
- "The Welfare State in Post-Communist Countries: The Romanian Case", in Re-conceptualizing the Welfare State, the Danish Center for Human Rights, ed. Copenhagen, 1996;
- "Romania's Relations with the Republic of Moldova" (in co-operation), in the review International Studies, Centre for International Studies, Bucharest, 1995;
- "Nationalism and its Impact upon Rule of Law in Romania" (in co-operation), in the review International Studies, Bucharest, 1995;
- "Study on the Conception of Democratic Alliance of Hungarians in Romania on the Rights of National Minorities" (in co-operation), Centre for Human Rights, Bucharest, 1994;
- "Two draft laws on the protection of minorities" (in co-operation), in Legislation in transition, Bucharest, 1994.

Other articles/papers on the Romanian legal system, the implementation of international human rights/minority rights legislation by the Romanian Courts and the human rights/minority rights situation in Romania.
