= Călin Popescu-Tăriceanu =

Prime Minister of Romania from 2004 to 2008

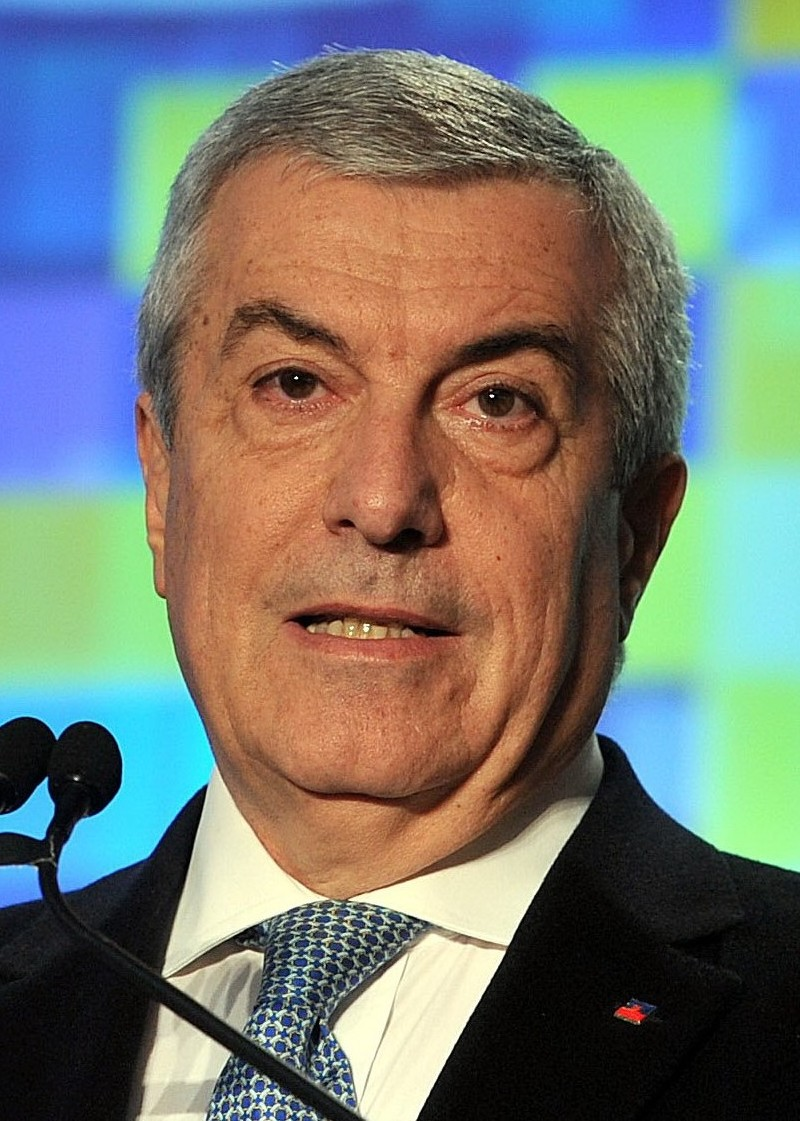
- Tăriceanu in 2014

President of the Senate of Romania
- In office 10 March 2014 – 2 September 2019
- Preceded by: Crin Antonescu
- Succeeded by: Teodor Meleșcanu

Prime Minister of Romania
- In office 29 December 2004 – 22 December 2008
- President: Traian Băsescu; Nicolae Văcăroiu (Acting); Traian Băsescu
- Preceded by: Eugen Bejinariu (Acting); Adrian Năstase
- Succeeded by: Emil Boc

Minister of Foreign Affairs
- Acting; 21 March 2007 – 5 April 2007
- Prime Minister: Himself
- Preceded by: Mihai-Răzvan Ungureanu
- Succeeded by: Adrian Cioroianu

Minister of Industry and Commerce
- In office 12 December 1996 – 5 December 1997
- Prime Minister: Victor Ciorbea
- Preceded by: Alexandru Stănescu
- Succeeded by: Mircea Ciumara

Founding Leader of the Alliance of Liberals and Democrats
- In office 19 June 2015 – 19 October 2020 Serving with Daniel Constantin (until April 2017)
- Preceded by: Himself (as president of the Liberal Reformist Party); Daniel Constantin (as president of the Conservative Party)
- Succeeded by: Daniel Olteanu

Leader of the National Liberal Party
- In office 2 October 2004 – 20 March 2009
- Preceded by: Theodor Stolojan
- Succeeded by: Crin Antonescu

Founding Leader of the Liberal Reformist Party
- In office 3 July 2014 – 19 June 2015
- Succeeded by: Himself & Daniel Constantin (party merged with the Conservative Party into the Alliance of Liberals and Democrats)
Additional offices
Member of the Senate
In office 19 December 2012 – 20 December 2020
Constituency	Bucharest
Member of the Chamber of Deputies
In office 18 June 1990 – 15 October 1992
Constituency	Arad County
In office 22 November 1996 – 18 December 2012
Constituency	Bucharest

Personal details
- Born: Călin Constantin Anton Popescu-Tăriceanu; 14 January 1952 (age 74) Bucharest, Romania
- Party: Romanian Communist Party (before 1990); National Liberal Party (1990); National Liberal Party - Youth Wing (1990–1993); Liberal Party 1993 (1993–1998); National Liberal Party (1998–2014); Liberal Reformist Party (2014–2015); Alliance of Liberals and Democrats (2015–2020); PRO Romania (2020–2021)
- Other political affiliations: Alliance of Liberals and Democrats for Europe Party (2004–2009; 2015–2019)
- Spouse(s): Cornelia Tăriceanu (Divorced); Livia Tăriceanu (Divorced); Ioana Tăriceanu (Divorced); Loredana Moise
- Children: 2
- Education: Technical University of Civil Engineering

Călin Constantin Anton Popescu-Tăriceanu (Romanian pronunciation: [kəˈliŋ konstanˈtin anˈton poˈpesku təriˈtʃe̯anu]; born 14 January 1952) is a Romanian politician who served as prime minister of Romania from 2004 to 2008. He was also president of the National Liberal Party (PNL) and the vice-president of the European Liberal Democrat and Reform Party (ELDR), two positions he assumed in 2004.

He previously served as the President of the Senate, the second position in the Romanian state, from 2014 until his resignation in 2019, having previously resigned from his own party, the PNL, and then becoming an independent senator. In July 2014, he established the Liberal Reformist Party (PLR) which later merged with the Conservative Party (PC) in order to form the Alliance of Liberals and Democrats (ALDE).

== Early life ==
Călin Popescu-Tăriceanu was born in Bucharest. His mother, Alexandrina Louiza, was of Greek ancestry–her mother was fully Greek while her father was half-Romanian, half-Greek. He has been married five times and has three children. Tăriceanu is a graduate of the Technical University of Civil Engineering of Bucharest and has a master's degree in Mathematics and Computer Science.

== Early political career ==
Between 1996 and 1997, he served as Minister of Industries and Commerce in Victor Ciorbea's CDR-led cabinet. Between 1996 and 2004, he was a member of the Chamber of Deputies, representing Bucharest. Between 2000 and 2004, he was vice president of the PNL group in Parliament, as well as vice president of the Budget, Finances and Insurance Committee in the Chamber of Deputies.

== Premiership (2004–2008) ==
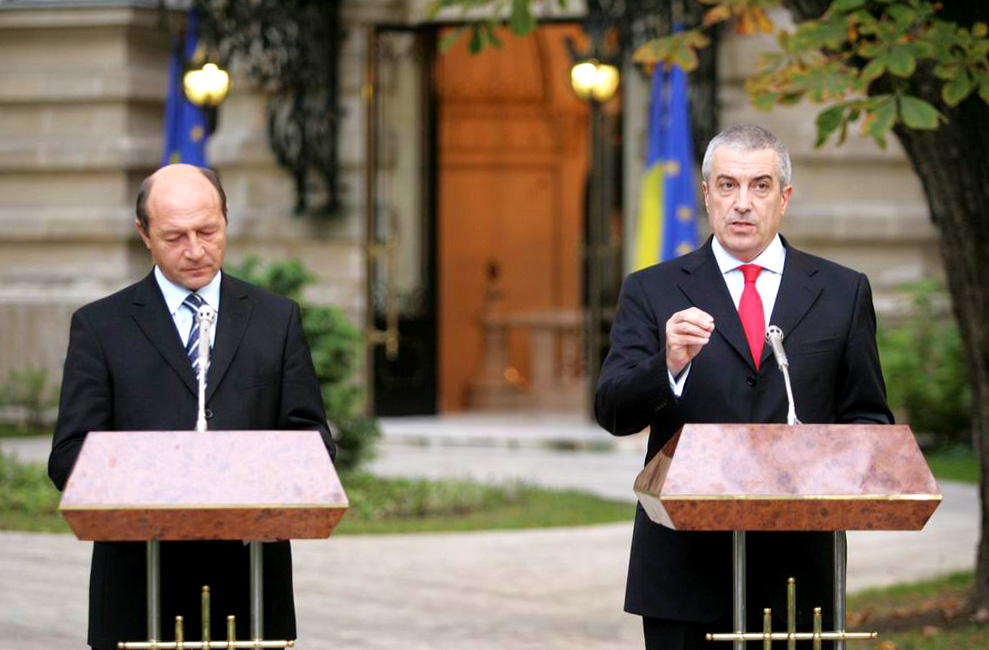
Tăriceanu with Traian Băsescu on 25 October 2005

Following the victory of Traian Băsescu in the 2004 presidential election, Băsescu appointed Tăriceanu as prime minister, in line with a pre-electoral agreement between the two parties of the Justice and Truth Alliance (DA). The new government took office on 29 December; it was approved by Parliament by a vote of 265 for and 200 against. Consequently, he became the first National Liberal prime minister of Romania since 1937.

The Tăriceanu government oversaw a number of major reforms, such as the introduction of a flat tax, the revaluation of the leu, the abolition of conscription and professionalization of the Romanian Armed Forces, and the accession of Romania to the European Union in 2007. His term also coincided with a considerable economic boom in Romania. However, economists criticized several of Tăriceanu's policies, such as the introduction of a "first registration tax" for motor vehicles, faulty management of over 2 billion euros acquired following the privatization of BCR, and, most prominently, an increase in the number of public servants and their salaries, which resulted in a major increase in public spending before the 2008 financial crisis.

On 7 July 2005, Tăriceanu announced that he and his cabinet would resign in order to trigger early elections. The announcement of the resignation was prompted by the Constitutional Court's decision to block a set of laws designed to reform the judicial system. President Traian Băsescu had been pushing for early elections since his victory in the 2004 elections. On 19 July, Tăriceanu reversed the decision and announced he would not resign, citing the severe floods that hit the country (for example the Comăneşti floods). Floods killed 66 people in Romania that year, leaving thousands homeless.

At that point, relations began to publicly sour between Tăriceanu and President Băsescu, who refused to meet with the Prime Minister in the days following the announced reversal.

In the view of former president Emil Constantinescu, however, relations between Tăriceanu and Băsescu started to become strained following allegations of Băsescu's past membership in the Securitate (during Communist Romania).

In September 2005, a newspaper alleged that on 9 April 2004, Tăriceanu bought 10 million shares of the Rompetrol company based on insider information, shares that were sold later that year after he became prime minister. Several other publicly known persons were cited to testify about their involvement in questionable transactions with Rompetrol shares, including the company's CEO, Dinu Patriciu.

On 5 April 2006, Băsescu stated that he regrets naming Tăriceanu Prime Minister, and accused him of partnership with other groups.

On 29 June 2006, Tăriceanu officially announced that the National Liberal Party (PNL) supports the withdrawal of Romanian troops from international battle zones where they are deployed without a mandate from the United Nations, NATO, or the European Union. This mainly concerns the Romanian troops in Iraq (present there following the Iraq War). This position is strongly opposed by President Băsescu.

On 14 March 2007, Tăriceanu postponed the elections for the European Parliament claiming that the political environment was too unstable due to discussions regarding President's impeachment, the subsequent referendum, and the fact that President Băsescu asked for a referendum regarding uninominal elections. The media also pointed out that Tăriceanu National Liberal Party (PNL) stood to perform poorly in the elections if they were held at the time.

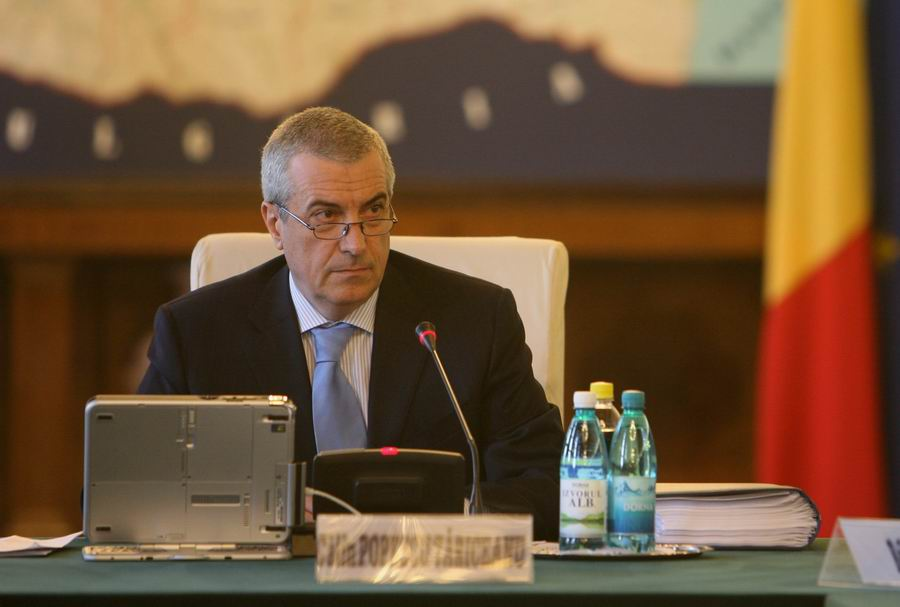
Tăriceanu at a cabinet meeting in 2007

On 21 March 2007, he assumed an ad interim (i.e. acting) position of the office of Minister of Foreign Affairs, 43 days after Ungureanu's resignation, because President Băsescu refused to accept the nomination of Adrian Cioroianu. On 5 April 2007, the Constitutional Court decided "The Romanian President's refusal to name a member of Government at the proposal of Prime Minister started a jurisdictional conflict of a constitutional nature.[...] The Romanian President has no right to veto, but he can ask the Prime Minister to renounce his proposal, if he observes that the proposed person does not meet the legal conditions required to be a member of Government". The same day, Cioroianu assumed the position of Minister of Foreign Affairs.

On 1 April 2007, Tăriceanu dismissed the ministers of the pro-Băsescu Democratic Party (PD) and formed a minority government with the Democratic Alliance of Hungarians in Romania (UDMR); Thus, the second Tăriceanu cabinet was approved by the Parliament on 3 April, with the support of the Social Democratic Party (PSD).

Tăriceanu's government survived a no-confidence vote on 3 October 2007, following a motion brought by the Social Democratic Party (PSD). Although 220 members of parliament voted in favor of the motion and only 152 voted against it, the motion fell short of the necessary 232 votes. On 2 June 2025, Tăriceanu was definitively acquitted on by the High Court of Cassation and Justice in a case in which he was accused of taking a bribe worth 800,000 US dollars.

== Later political career ==
On 26 February 2014, Tăriceanu left PNL due to their intention to leave the Social Liberal Union (USL) and the Alliance of Liberals and Democrats for Europe (ALDE) to join the European People's Party (EPP). One day later, he announced that he would launch a new political party, the Liberal Reformist Party (PLR). The party's first congress was held on 1–2 August 2014. Tăriceanu was elected president of the new party.

On 4 March, PNL leader Crin Antonescu stepped down his position as President of the Senate. On 10 March, Tăriceanu was elected as the new president of the Senate, with the votes of the Social Democratic Party (PSD) and serving as independent senator.

In late July 2014, Tăriceanu launched his candidacy for the 2014 presidential elections. Due to problems with registering his new political party, he ran as independent. Tăriceanu placed third in the election's first round, with 5.36%, behind Klaus Iohannis and Victor Ponta. Later, he announced that he would support Ponta in the second round of the elections. However, in the run-off, Ponta was defeated by Iohannis by a 54.5%-45.5% margin.

In July 2015, PLR announced its merger with the Conservative Party (PC), to form a new party, Alliance of Liberals and Democrats (ALDE), Tăriceanu becoming its co-president.

In 2017, Tăriceanu described himself as a monarchist, saying: "Constitutional monarchy has the advantage of placing the monarch over political games, which is not our case: the president, instead of being an arbitrator, prefers to be a player".

== Controversies ==
Tăriceanu has been accused by President Băsescu of interfering with justice in Dinu Patriciu's benefit.

On 24 January 2006, Monica Macovei, then Minister of Justice, made public a meeting with Tăriceanu which took place 7 months before (in June 2005), and to which Tăriceanu invited Dinu Patriciu. Patriciu complained to Macovei about alleged procedural problems regarding his case. Macovei accused Tăriceanu of interfering with justice. On 20 February 2006 Tăriceanu declared on TVR1:" I recognise my fault. I didn't act correctly. But I didn't influence justice."(in Romanian) "Îmi recunosc vina. Nu am procedat corect. Dar nu am influenţat justiţia"

Elena Udrea recalled that, while she was Presidential Counsellor, she saw a note written by Tăriceanu. In a few days President Băsescu found the note and made it public, saying that "The Prime Minister suggested to me a partnership, but, unfortunately, with our oligarchies"(in Romanian) "Domnul prim-ministru imi propunea un parteneriat, dar, din pacate, cu oligarhiile noastre". The note was about a complaint from Petromidia about the 27 May procedure problems:

Dear Traian,
1. I send you annexed a document released by Petromidia, regarding the ongoing investigations.
2. If you have the opportunity to speak at the Prosecuting Magistracy about the subject?

In May 2007, Patriciu won a lawsuit against the Romanian Intelligence Service (SRI), which illegally tapped his phones for two years. He received from SRI 50,000 RON as moral prejudice.

== Electoral history ==
=== Presidential elections ===
Election	Affiliation	First round			Second round		
Election	Affiliation	Votes	Percentage	Position	Votes	Percentage	Position
2014	Independent^{1}	508,572	5.36%	3rd	Not qualified		

Notes:

^{1} His party, PLR, did not manage to register in time for the elections, therefore he was forced to file his candidacy as an independent.

=== Mayor of Bucharest ===
Election	Affiliation	First round		
Election	Affiliation	Votes	Percentage	Position
2020	ALDE	9,892	1.49%	5th

== Bibliography ==
- Evenimentul Zilei, 14 December 2005, "Emil Constantinescu a adus documente despre care spune că atestă colaborarea preşedintelui Traian Băsescu cu Securitatea"
- Jurnalul National, 9 February 2006. "Urmează Tăriceanu?"

Political offices
Preceded by Alexandru Stănescu	Minister of Industry and Commerce; 1996–1997	Succeeded by Mircea Ciumara
Preceded by Eugen Bejinariu; Acting	Prime Minister of Romania; 2004–2008	Succeeded by Emil Boc
Preceded by Mihai Răzvan Ungureanu	Minister of Foreign Affairs; Acting; 2007	Succeeded by Adrian Cioroianu
Preceded by Crin Antonescu	President of the Romanian Senate; 2014–2019	Succeeded by Teodor Meleșcanu
Party political offices
Preceded by Theodor Stolojan	President of the National Liberal Party; 2004–2009	Succeeded by Crin Antonescu
