= Andrei Marga =

Romanian politician and academic

Rector of the Babeș-Bolyai University
- In office 1993–2004
- Preceded by: Ionel Haiduc
- Succeeded by: Nicolae Bocșan
- In office 2008–2012
- Preceded by: Nicolae Bocșan
- Succeeded by: Ioan-Aurel Pop

Minister of National Education
- In office 1997–1998
- President: Emil Constantinescu
- Prime Minister: Victor Ciorbea; Gavril Dejeu (ad interim)
- Preceded by: Virgil Petrescu
- Succeeded by: Himself
- Majority: Romanian Democratic Convention (CDR)
- In office 1998–1999
- Prime Minister: Radu Vasile; Alexandru Athanasiu (ad interim)
- Preceded by: Himself
- Succeeded by: Himself
- In office 1999–2000
- Prime Minister: Mugur Isărescu
- Preceded by: himself
- Succeeded by: Ecaterina Andronescu

Personal details
- Born: May 22, 1946 (age 80) Bucharest, Kingdom of Romania
- Party: National Liberal Party (PNL)
- Other political affiliations: Christian Democratic National Peasants' Party (1999–2001)
- Education: University of Cluj

Andrei Marga (Note: Romanian pronunciation: [anˈdrej ˈmarɡa]) (born 22 May 1946) is a Romanian philosopher, political scientist, and politician. Rector – for the second time – of the Babeș-Bolyai University in Cluj-Napoca, he was a member of the Christian Democratic National Peasants' Party (PNȚCD), serving as Minister of Education in the Democratic Convention (CDR) coalition governments of Victor Ciorbea, Radu Vasile, and Mugur Isărescu (1997–2000). In January 2001, he replaced Ion Diaconescu as PNȚCD president, but resigned from this position in July 2001, amid political tensions within the party. He subsequently formed a new political party, more specifically the Popular Christian Party later during the same year. Later on, he became a member of the National Liberal Party (PNL).

Marga has authored many volumes on political science, political philosophy, and the philosophy of history. His work touches a variety of subjects, including the philosophical theories of Herbert Marcuse and Jürgen Habermas, the nature of positivism, and trends in contemporary philosophy. He has also lectured on specific subjects, such as the philosophic foundations of transition from Communism to a market economy, and the evolution of principles guiding European integration. In later works, he approached topics pertaining to the philosophy of religion, and to the status of religion in the age of globalization. In 2005, Andrei Marga received the Herder Prize in recognition of his contributions.

== Biography ==
Marga was born in Bucharest, attended the University of Cluj and also had a one-year scholarship at the University of Freiburg (West Germany). In 1993, he became rector of the Babeș-Bolyai University of Cluj-Napoca.

As minister, Andrei Marga promoted educational system reform, stressing that the communist legacy had contributed to a rise in political corruption, and indicating that Romanian education lacked staples of professionalism such as underlined purposes, standards in certification, and evaluation criteria. Marga also criticized the system for relying on "original features" and "Romanian traditions", which had been explained as a means to promote national development, but, in effect, had contributed to the gap between Romania and the Western world. He called for modernization, and defined his goals as "increasing the links between education and the economic, administrative and cultural environment, improving the educational infrastructure, eliminating paternalism and populism from educational management, and enhancing international cooperation in education".

The program was criticized by the political opposition, who argued that the system in place was satisfactory, and blamed the existing problems on the post-1989 political and social climate. In parallel, supporters of reform were dissatisfied with its slow pace and inadequate financing.

In early 1998, a controversy erupted in Romanian politics, after the CDR announced that it was planning to stand by the plan to set up separate universities for the Hungarian minority. The decision was in turn based on a promise made to their coalition partner, the Democratic Union of Hungarians in Romania (UDMR). In this context, Marga took the middle ground, saying that he supported separate Hungarian-language sections but not separate institutions (a similar view was expressed by the CDR's other coalition partner, the Democratic Party).

Marga joined the PNȚCD in 1999, and became its leader two years later. Party rules prohibited members with less than five years in the party from running for party president. During the party's congress, a few candidates resigned in support of Marga and the party's constitution was amended to allow Marga to run. Marga defeated his conservative opponents with the support of the congress in spite of opposition from the party hierarchy. He was brought in to reform the party and position it to recover from the losses of the December 2000 election. His tenure failed to bring in the rapid changes desired and opposition from prominent conservative elements in his party stifled his ideas. He resigned in July 2001.

In 2002, Marga joined the PNȚCD's former coalition partner, the National Liberal Party (PNL). From May to August 2012, Marga served as Foreign Minister in the government of Victor Ponta.

Later, information spread that Marga was an informant for Securitate, the secret police of the Socialist Republic of Romania. He tried to deny it but lost the case in court.

In September 2022, Marga claimed that Ukraine's borders are "unnatural" and that Ukraine should cede its territories to its neighbors, Romania, Russia, Poland, and Hungary.

== Published works ==
- Herbert Marcuse. Studiu critic ("Herbert Marcuse. A Critical Study"), Editura Dacia, Cluj-Napoca, 1980, 250 p.
- Cunoaștere și sens. Perspective critice asupra pozitivismului ("Cognition and Sense. A Critical Approach of Positivism"), Editura Politică, Bucharest, 1984, 256 p.
- Acțiune și rațiune în concepția lui Jürgen Habermas ("Action and Reason with Jürgen Habermas"), Editura Dacia, Cluj-Napoca, 1985, 306 p.
- Raționalitate, comunicare, argumentare ("Rationality, Communication, Argumentation"), Editura Dacia, Cluj-Napoca, 1991, 327 p.
- Introducere în metodologia și argumentarea filosofică ("Introduction to Philosophical Methodology and Argumentation"), Editura Dacia, Cluj-Napoca, 1992, 194 p.
- Philosophy in the Eastern Transition, Editura Apostrof, Cluj-Napoca, 1993, 200 p.; (expanded edition), Editura Apostrof, Cluj-Napoca, 1995, 283 p.
- Explorări în actualitate ("Explorations into the Present Time"), Editura Apostrof, Cluj-Napoca, 1995, 187 p.
- Filosofia unificării europene ("The Philosophy of the European Unification"), Editura Apostrof, Cluj-Napoca, 1995, 257 p.; (second edition), Editura Apostrof, Cluj-Napoca, 1997, 392 p.
- Universitatea în tranziție ("University in Transition"), Editura Apostrof, Cluj-Napoca, 1996, 209 p.
- Academic Reform. A Case Study, Cluj University Press, Cluj-Napoca, 1997, 100 p.
- Reconstrucția pragmatică a filosofiei ("The Pragmatic Reconstruction of Philosophy"), Polirom, Iași, 1998, 193 p.
- Educația în tranziție ("Education in Transition"), Editura Dacia, Cluj-Napoca, 1999, 126 p.
- Relativismul și consecințele sale ("Relativism and Its Consequences"), Editura Studiilor Europene, Cluj-Napoca, 1999, 200 p.
- Anii reformei: 1997–2000 ("The Years of Reform: 1997–2000"), Editura Studiilor Europene, Cluj-Napoca, 2001, 200 p.
- University Reform Today, Cluj University Press, Cluj-Napoca, 2001, 214 p.
- Bildung und Modernisierung ("Education and Modernization"), Cluj University Press, Cluj-Napoca, 2001, 206 p.
- Introducere în filosofia contemporană ("Introduction to Contemporary Philosophy"), Polirom, Iași, 2002, 560 p.
- Ieșirea din trecut (documente și reflecții) ("Path out of the Past. Documents and Reflections"), Editura Alma Mater, Cluj-Napoca, 2002, 264 p.
- Filosofia lui Habermas ("The Philosophy of Habermas"), Polirom, Iași, 2006, 520 p.
- Diagnoze - Articole și eseuri ("Diagnoses - Articles and Essays"), Editura Eikon, Cluj-Napoca, 2008, 550 p.
- Dialoguri cu David Ward, HeNoi Paul, Roland Lohkamp, Michel Grimaldi, E.S. Zenon Cardinal Grocholewski, Hans Gert Pöttering, E.S. Christoph Cardinal Schönborn, Î.P.S. Bartolomeu Anania, Robert S. Wistrich, Gianfranco Ghirlanda, Édith Cresson, Hans Küng, René-Samuel Sirat, Gianni Vattimo, Cluj University Press, Cluj, 2008
- Philosophia et Theologia Hodie, Editura Fundaţiei pentru Studii Europene, Cluj, 2008
- La Sortie du Relativisme, Editura Limes, Cluj, 2008
- Philosophie der europäischen Einigung, Cluj University Press, Cluj, 2009
- Frații mai mari. Intâlniri cu iudaismul (The Older brothers. Encounters with Judaism), Editura Hasefer, Bucharest, 2009
- Absolutul astăzi. Teologia și filosofia lui Joseph Ratzinger (Absolute today. Joseph Ratzinger's theology and philosophy), Editura Eikon, Cluj, 2010
- Criza și după criză (Crisis and after the crisis), Editura Eikon, Cluj, 2010, 210 p. (second edition)
- Argumentarea (Argumentation), Editura Academiei Române, Bucharest, 2010
- Challenges, Values and Vision, Cluj University Press, Cluj, 2011
- Profilul și reforma Universității clujene (Profile and Reform of the Cluj University), Cluj University Press, Cluj, 2011, 480 p. (third edition).
- Riflessioni italiane, Editura Grinta, 2011
- După cincisprezece ani. Fifteen Years after (1998–2004 şi 2008–2012), Presa Universitară Cluj, 2011
- România actuală (Diagnoză), Editura Eikon, Cluj, 2011
- The Destiny of Europe, Editura Academiei Române, București, 2011
- The Pragmatic Reconstruction of Philosophy, Cluj University Press, Cluj, 2012
- Crizele Modernității Târzii, Editura Academiei Române, București, 2012
- Sincronizarea culturii române, Editura Tribuna, 2013
- Schimbarea lumii – Globalizare, cultură, geopolitică, Editura Academiei Romane, 2013
- România într-o lume în schimbare, Andrei Marga, interviuri cu Romeo Couți, Ecou Transilvan, 2013

== International Prizes ==
- 2008 Prize of Sara and Haim Ianculovici Foundation – Haifa (Israel)
- 2005 Herder Prize (Austria – Germany)
- 2003 Gold Medal – University of Tübingen (Germany)
- 2002 România – Israel Award & The Medal of Jerusalem (Israel)

== State Awards and other International Awards ==
- 2019 Doctor Honoris Causa – École nationale d'administration publique (ENAP) (Québec, Canada)
- 2011 Doctor Honoris Causa – Baku Pedagogical State University (Azerbaijan)
- 2010 Doctor Honoris Causa – "Alecu Russo" Balty State University (Republic of Moldova)
- 2010 Doctor Honoris Causa – "Corvinus" University of Budapest (Hungary)
- 2009 Ordine della Stella della Solidarietà Italiana in grado di Cavaliere (President of Italian Republic)
- 2008 Honorary Dignitary of Carmel City (Israel)
- 2008 Doctor Honoris Causa – "Paul Valery" University of Montpellier (France)
- 2006 Doctor of Humane Letters – Plymouth State University of New Hampshire State (USA)
- 2006 A Commendation of the Governor of State of New Hampshire (USA)
- 2006 Medaglia Pontificia. Anno I. BenedictusXVI (Vatican)
- 2005 Medaglia Pontificia. Anno XXVI. Joannes Paulus II (Vatican)
- 2003 Das Grosse Verdienstkreuz (President of Germany)
- 2003 Doctor Honoris Causa – Debrecen University (Hungary)
- 2002 Palmes Académiques – Ministère de l'Education Nationale (France)
- 2000 Gra-Cruz da Ordem National do Merito (President of Portugal)
- 2000 Doctor Honoris Causa – "Ion Creangă" University of Chişinău (Republic of Moldova)
- 2000 Insigne Aureum – University of Maribor (Slovenia)
- 1999 Grand Officier de l'Ordre National du Mérite (President of France)

== Notes ==
Academic offices
Preceded by Ionel Haiduc	Rector of the Babeș-Bolyai University; 1993–2004	Succeeded by Nicolae Bocşan
Political offices
Preceded by Virgil Petrescu	Minister of Education; 1997–2000	Succeeded by Ecaterina Andronescu
Preceded by Cristian Diaconescu	Minister of Foreign Affairs; 2012	Succeeded by Titus Corlățean
Party political offices
Preceded by Constantin Dudu Ionescu	President of the Christian Democratic National Peasants' Party	Succeeded by Victor Ciorbea
Cultural offices
Preceded by Horia-Roman Patapievici	President of the Romanian Cultural Institute; 2012–present	Incumbent
