= Raluca Ripan =

Romanian chemist

- Raluca Ripan
- Born: 27 June 1894; Iași, Kingdom of Romania
- Died: 5 December 1972 (aged 78); Cluj-Napoca, Socialist Republic of Romania
- Resting place: Hajongard Cemetery, Cluj-Napoca
- Education: University of Iași; University of Cluj
- Scientific career
- Fields: Chemistry
- Workplaces: University of Cluj
- Thesis: Double amines corresponding to double sulphates in the magnesium series (1922)
- Doctoral advisor: Gheorghe Spacu
- Notable students: Ionel Haiduc

Raluca Ripan (27 June 1894 – 5 December 1972) was a Romanian chemist, and a titular member of the Romanian Academy. She wrote many treatises, especially in the field of analytical chemistry.

== Biography ==
She was born in Iași, in the Moldavia region of Romania; her parents were Constantin and Smaranda Ripan, both originally from Huși. She attended the local girl's high school, after which she enrolled in the Faculty of Science of the University of Iași, graduating in 1919. For her graduate studies she went to the University of Cluj in Transylvania, obtaining her PhD in 1922 under the direction of Gheorghe Spacu, with thesis "Double amines corresponding to double sulphates in the magnesium series". She is recognized as the first woman from Romania to earn a Ph.D. in the chemical sciences.

After obtaining in 1930 her Habilitation and the title of Docent, Ripan became an associate professor of analytic chemistry at the Faculty of Science of the University of Cluj. During World War II, when Cluj passed under Hungarian administration under the terms of the Second Vienna Award, the university moved to Timișoara. In July 1942 (by which time she had 53 publications), she was promoted to full professor through a decree published in Monitorul Oficial. After the war she returned to Cluj, where she served as Dean of the Faculty of Chemistry from 1948 to 1952.

In 1948, Ripan was elected titular member of the Romanian Academy, thus becoming the first woman to be inducted in that academy. In 1951 she founded the Institute of Chemistry, consisting of three sections (inorganic chemistry, organic chemistry, and physical chemistry); she headed the institute until 1970. From 1951 to 1955 she served as Rector of the University of Cluj, the first woman to hold a rectorship in Romania. In 1952 she was elected deputy to the Great National Assembly for the Cluj-Nord constituency of the Cluj Region, serving in this capacity until 1957. In 1963 she was awarded an honorary degree by the Nicolaus Copernicus University in Toruń.

Ripan worked in the domain of complex combinations and their use in analytical chemistry. She discovered and studied new classes of complex combinations used in the determination of metals, as well as new methods of assay for thallium, lead, tellurium, selenic acid, and selenocyanates. One of her students at the University of Cluj was Ionel Haiduc (a future President of the Romanian Academy), who wrote an undergraduate thesis on polyoxometalates under her direction in 1959.

She died in Cluj-Napoca in 1972, and is buried at the city's Hajongard Cemetery. The "Raluca Ripan Institute for Research in Chemistry" is now part of Babeș-Bolyai University. A vocational high school in Cluj-Napoca also bears her name, as does a national Chemistry competition for high school students.

== Publications ==
=== Research articles ===
- Ripan-Tilici, Raluca (1935). "Eine direkte und eine indirekte argentometrische Bestimmung von Cyanaten mit Adsorptionsindikatoren". Fresenius' Zeitschrift für analytische Chemie (in German). 102 (1–2): 32–34. doi:10.1007/BF01382058. S2CID 95159512.
- Ripan-Tilici, Raluca (1939). "Neue konduktometrische Bestimmung der selenigen Säure mit Silber-Ion". Fresenius' Zeitschrift für analytische Chemie (in German). 117 (1–2): 47–49. doi:10.1007/BF01393179. S2CID 95359457.
- Ripan, Raluca; Várhelyi, Csaba; Ürmösi, J. (1964). "Neue Kobalt(III)-dimethylglyoximin-komplexe mit Benzylamin". Zeitschrift für anorganische und allgemeine Chemie (in German). 332 (1–2): 95–102. doi:10.1002/zaac.19643320111.
- Ripan, Raluca; Sacelean, Viorel (1965). "Une nouvelle méthode pour le dosage gravimétrique de l'uranium". Talanta. 12 (1): 69–72. doi:10.1016/0039-9140(65)80011-X.
- Ripan, Raluca; Calu, Cleopatra (1967). "Étude de la formation des dodecatungstates et le dosage des iso- et hétérododeca-tungstates a l'aide du chlorure de tetraphénylphosphonium". Talanta (in French). 14 (8): 887–891. doi:10.1016/0039-9140(67)80118-8. PMID 18960179.

=== Textbooks ===
- Ripan, Raluca; Ceteanu, Ion (1961). Manual de lucrări practice de chimie anorganică. Vol. I: Metaloizi (in Romanian). Bucharest: Editura de Stat Didactică și Pedagogică.
- Ripan, Raluca; Popper, Ervin; Liteanu, Candin (1963). Chimie analitică calitativă. Semimicroanaliză (in Romanian) (Fourth ed.). Bucharest: Editura Didactică și Pedagogică. OCLC 153977046.
- Ripan, Raluca (1967). Chimia metalelor (vol. I) (in Romanian). Bucharest: Editura Didactică și Pedagogică. OCLC 699830779.
- Ripan, Raluca; Ceteanu, Ion (1969). Chimia metalelor (vol. II) (in Romanian). Bucharest: Editura Didactică și Pedagogică. OCLC 895500091.
