= Dezső Kalinovszky =

Romanian Magyar writer

Dezső Kalinovszky (born 6 June 1933 in Cluj, died 19 December 2009 in Cluj-Napoca) was a Romanian writer of Hungarian ethnicity. He studied technology in Odessa and worked at Babeș-Bolyai University.

== Works ==
- A pokoli pulóver és más ördöngösségek, porjunulara romano, Kvár, 1972;
- Szemenszedett igazság. Skizoj, humurajxoj, Kvár, 1975.
