= Jesuit Academy of Kolozsvár =

Coordinates: 46°46′3.74″N 23°35′25.88″E

Jesuit Academy of Kolozsvár/Universitas Claudiopolitana
- Academicum Claudiopolitanum Societatis Jesu Collegium
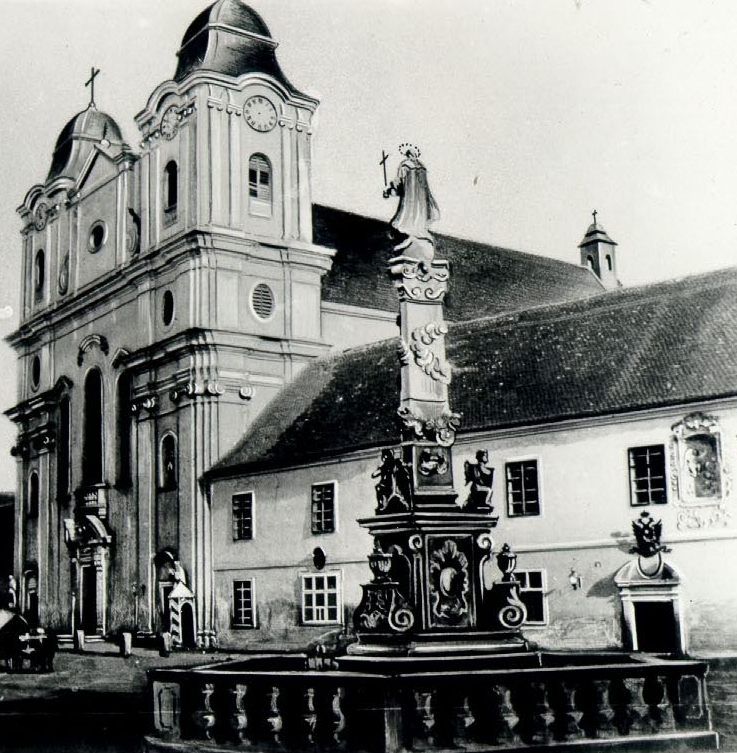
- The Jesuit Church and the Academy (historical picture)
- Type: Built as Jesuit College
- Established: 1581; 445 years ago
- Founders: Stephen Báthory, prince of Transylvania and king of Poland

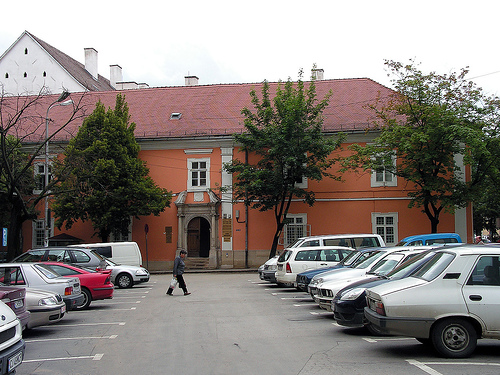
Convictus Nobilium

The Jesuit Academy of Kolozsvár was a Jesuit educational institution in Kolozsvár, Kingdom of Hungary (modern-day Cluj-Napoca), founded in 1581 by King Stephen Báthory.

It began with seven Jesuit professors from Italy, Germany, and Poland who constituted the Collegium Academicum Claudiopolitanum. The first rector of the college was the Polish Jesuit priest Jakub Wujek. Academia Cladiopolitana had a university statute, having the royal right to confer the university titles of baccalaureus, magister, and doctor, in two faculties: philosophy, followed by theology.

The Jesuits were banished in 1603 and the Academy was closed in 1606, but in 1698 they came again after the restoration of the Academy. The institution experienced a special momentum in the 18th century, when a large boarding school, called Convictus Nobilium, was built next to the church and university, where students were received regardless of their ethnic origin. Since 1698 until 1786 the Academy evolved into Universitas Claudiopolitana (see the cover of the book from 1742 by Andreas Matis entitled Peregrinus Catholicus de peregrina unitaria religione), and later even having the four classical faculties: Philosophy (since 1581), as a prerequisite for Theology (since 1581, reorganized in 1712/1767), Law (1774), and Medicine (since 1775/1776).

It was partially succeeded by Franz Joseph University, Babeș-Bolyai University, and University of Szeged.

== History ==
The founding document of the Academic College in Kolozsvár was issued by King Stephen Báthory in Vilnius on 12 May 1581. The steps for setting up this college were taken by Italian diplomat Antonio Possevino. The first academic rector of the college was Jakub Wujek, a philologist who had previously been the first rector of the newly established University of Vilnius. The institution had the rights to confer the university/academic titles of baccalaureus, magister, and doctor. The University operated during this first period near the Church on Faekas street (today str. Mihail Kogălniceanu nr. 21, today in Cluj-Napoca, Romania). For funding the University of Kolozsvár was granted the income of the Monastery of Kolozsmonostor (today Mănăștur, Romania), with six villages. The institution numbered more than 180 students in 1585. In 1603, in the context of occupying the city by Moses Székely, the Jesuits were expelled, their goods devastated, and in the 1606 the university closed.

The Vienna Court restored the university on November 17, 1698. From 1712/1725, the rector of the institution was empowered to hold the title of rector magnificus. In 1713 there arose the Fundatores Academiae Transsilvaniae Claudiopoli, a work for foundations of the higher education in Cluj. In 1753 Universitas Claudiopolitana was re-organized as an imperial university, more and more under the influence of the state, rather than the Jesuits. Following 1773, after the suppression of the Society of Jesus, Empress Maria-Theresa further developed Universitas Claudiopolitana (with teaching both in Latin and German). Indeed, during its maximum development, Universitas Claudiopolitana had the four classical faculties: Philosophy (since 1581), as a prerequisite for Theology (since 1581, re-organized in 1712/1767), Law (1774), and Medicine (since 1775/1776). Due to the reforms in the empire, the Universitas Claudiopolitana was transformed in 1786 into a semiuniversity institution (e.g., institution, which made the connection between secondary studies and university studies, for example, having the right to confer superior titles of baccalaureus, even magister, but not doctor). Thus, the Universitas Claudiopolitana was followed after 1786 by two institutions with a semiuniversity statute: (a) the Surgical-Medical Institute and (b) the Academy of Law (1786-1850 and re-founded in 1863).

Starting with 1872, the Hungarian Royal University of Kolozsvár was founded, with teaching in Hungarian, which included the two semiuniversity institutions already existing in the city. In 1919, the Hungarian university was taken over by the Romanian authorities and the Romanian University of Cluj has been established. The Romanian and the Hungarian universities – derived from Franz Joseph University and King Ferdinand University - were united in 1959 under the name of Babeș-Bolyai University.

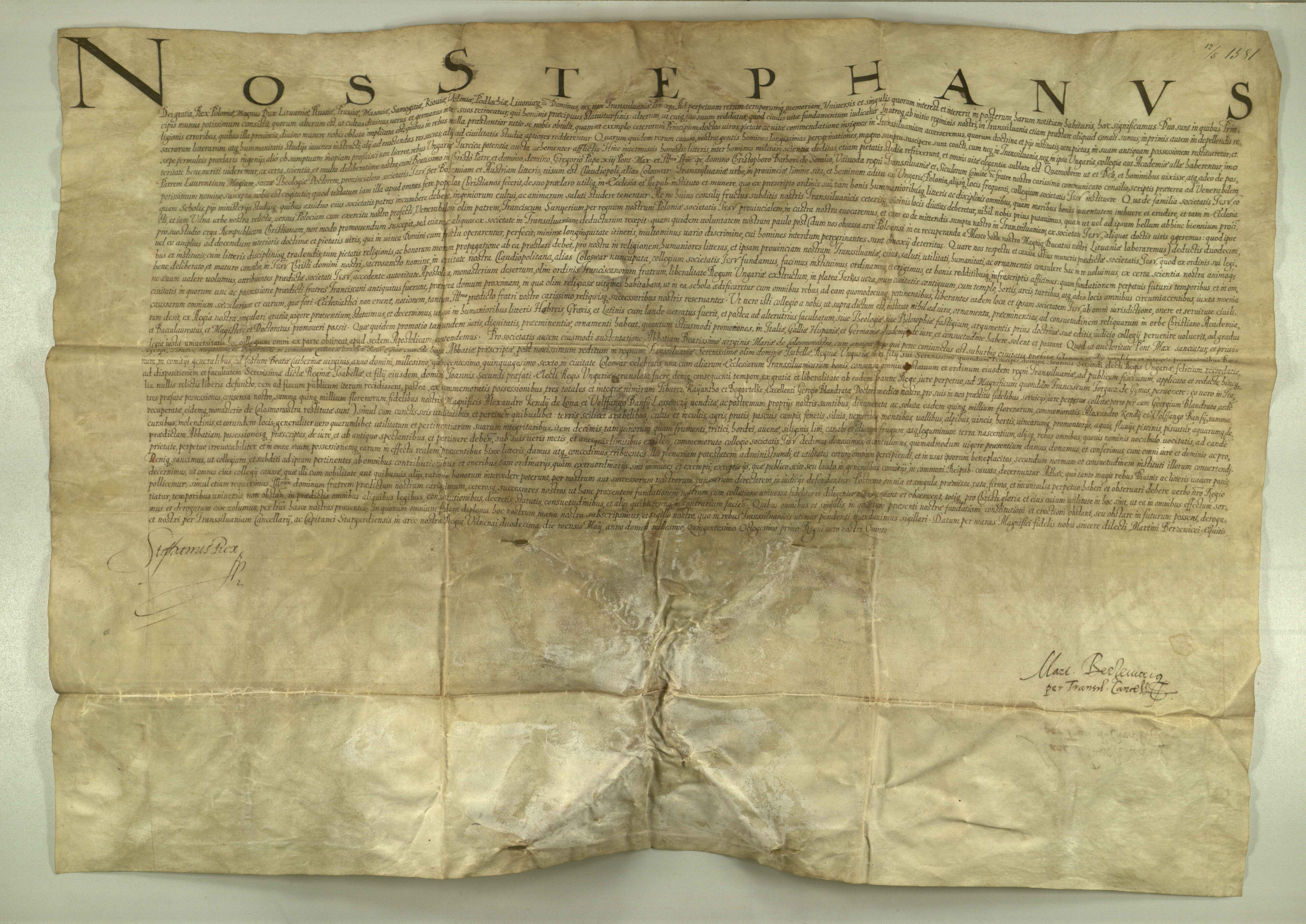
The Diploma issued by Stephen Báthory in 1581 establishing the Jesuit Academy in Kolozsvár, having the rights to confer the university/academic titles of baccalaureus, magister, and doctor.

== Teaching Staff ==
Academia/Universitas Claudiopolitana had famous professor and alumni. Among professor of the academy/university during the first period (1581-1606) one can name famous Jesuits like Jacub Wujek and Arator and Peter Pazmany as one of the alumni. During the second period (1698-1786), Maximilian Hell was one of the most famous professors of the university, who also set up the first astronomical observatory in Cluj

== See also ==
- List of Jesuit sites
