= Gheorghe Spacu =

Romanian inorganic chemist

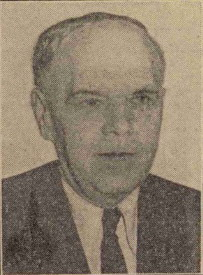
Gheorghe Spacu, 1952

Gheorghe Spacu (December 5, 1883 – July 23, 1955) was a Romanian inorganic chemist.

Born in Iași, he attended the city's National College from 1894 to 1901. He subsequently enrolled in the physics and chemistry section of the sciences faculty at the University of Iași. There, his professors included Petru Poni (inorganic chemistry), Vasile Buțureanu (mineralogy and crystallography), Anastasie Obregia (organic chemistry) and Dragomir Hurmuzescu (electrochemistry). Upon graduating in 1905, he went to deepen his studies at the universities of University of Vienna and then Berlin. He returned in 1907, when he began working as an assistant in the inorganic chemistry laboratory of Neculai Costăchescu, and was promoted to head of operations in 1916. That year, he received a doctorate in chemistry, having submitted a thesis on iron compounds. After Costăchescu, he was the second individual to receive a doctorate in chemistry from a Romanian university. Subsequently, he was named associate professor at Iași University.

In 1919, following the union of Transylvania with Romania and the establishment of the University of Cluj, he was invited to teach as associate professor of inorganic and analytic chemistry. He was promoted to full professor in 1922. While at Cluj, he put together a school of chemistry, founding and supplying laboratories for students and researches and advising sixteen doctoral students. Among those he trained were Raluca Ripan, Ilie G. Murgulescu, Petru Spacu and Coriolan Drăgulescu. Petru, his only son, worked in his father's department after obtaining a doctorate, later moving to Bucharest. Of Gheorghe Spacu's 274 scientific articles, around two-thirds were written while he was at Cluj. These were generally published in the bulletin of the local scientific society, of which he was a founding member in 1921. He was elected a corresponding member of the Romanian Academy in 1927, and was promoted to titular member in 1935. He was assistant dean of the science faculty in 1923–1924, dean in 1924–1925, rector of the university in 1925–1926 and assistant rector in 1926–1927.

In 1939, he was asked to join the inorganic and analytic chemistry department of the University of Bucharest, where he began work in October 1940. As before, he focused on establishing laboratories and training chemists. Maria Brezeanu was one of his doctoral students. During his Bucharest period, his work appeared in the bulletin of the Academy's scientific section. He received three awards from the communist authorities: the state prize (1952 and 1954) and the order of labor (1953). He continued working until his death in 1955.
