= Talanta =

- Discipline: Analytical chemistry
- Language: English
- Edited by: Spas Kolev

Publication details
- History: 1958–present
- Publisher: Elsevier
- Frequency: 15/year
- Impact factor: 5.6 (2023)

Standard abbreviations
- ISO 4: Talanta

Indexing
- CODEN: TLNTA2
- ISSN: 0039-9140 (print); 1873-3573 (web)
- OCLC no.: 01767116

Links
- Journal homepage; Online access

Talanta is a peer-reviewed scientific journal in pure and applied analytical chemistry. It was established in 1958 and is published by Elsevier, with 15 issues per year. In addition to original research articles, Talanta also publishes review articles and short communications.

According to the Journal Citation Reports, it received a 2014 impact factor of 3.545, ranking it eleventh out of 74 journals in the category "Chemistry, analytical". As of 2023, its impact factor was 5.6.
