= Otto Adler =

Otto Adler (4 May 1929 – 6 May 2014) was a Romanian Holocaust survivor, the president of the Jewish Association of Romania, and a polyglot. He spoke fluently in Romanian, Hebrew, English, French, German, Hungarian, and Russian.

== Early life ==
Otto Adler was born on 4 May 1929, into a large Jewish family from Cluj. In 1953 he graduated at the Mechanical Faculty from the Politehnica University of Bucharest where he taught until 1994. From 1961 to 1991 he worked at the Metallurgic Research Institute in Bucharest.

== World War II ==
During World War II, Adler was a prisoner at the Auschwitz-Birkenau camp. He was 15 years old when he arrived at the camp but despite a frail appearance managed to avoid certain death by answering that his real age was 17 when asked by the guards. This advice was received from the other inmates because everyone under the age of 13 was sent to the gas chamber along with those under 17 years which weren't considered physically fit. He weighed 70 kg (150 lb) when he arrived, but only 29 kg (64 lb) when he left the camp.

== After the war ==
Adler was awarded the Order of the Star of Romania in 2007. When talking about antisemitism in Romania Mr Adler declared:

I can honestly say that there is still anti-Semitism in Romania. And this in the condition that there are about 8,000 Jews in the country!

Adler died on 6 May 2014, at the age of 85.
