= Péter Eckstein-Kovács =

Romanian lawyer and politician (born 1956)

Péter Eckstein-Kovács (born July 5, 1956) is a Romanian lawyer and politician. A former member of the Democratic Alliance of Hungarians in Romania (UDMR), he was a member of the Romanian Chamber of Deputies for Cluj County from 1990 to 1992 and a member of the Cluj-Napoca city council from 1992 to 1996. That year, he was elected to the Romanian Senate, where he served until 2008, except for a stint as Minister-Delegate for National Minorities in the Radu Vasile cabinet (1999) and a break until he was elected again in November 2000.

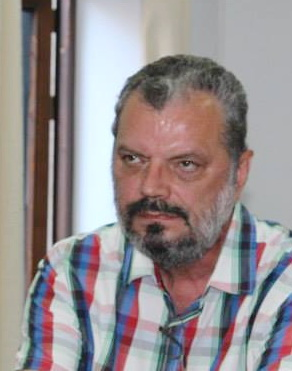
Péter Eckstein-Kovács (photo by László Horváth)

He and his wife have three children.

== Biography ==
He was born to ethnic Hungarian parents in Cluj and studied law at the city's Babeş-Bolyai University from 1975 to 1980. From 1980 to 1981, he was a legal adviser in Miercurea-Ciuc, and since 1981 he has worked as a lawyer there and in Cluj-Napoca. He states that he was not a member of the Romanian Communist Party and did not collaborate with the Securitate.

Following the 1989 Revolution, Eckstein-Kovács joined the UDMR as a founding member and represented it in the Chamber from 1990 to 1992. From that year until 1996, he was on the Cluj-Napoca city council, after which he was elected to the Senate, also for Cluj County. In January 1999, following the resignation of György Tokay, he was appointed Minister-Delegate for National Minorities in Radu Vasile's cabinet, serving until the cabinet fell that December. He was elected to the Senate again in November 2000, serving until 2008. While there, his priorities included judicial reform and fighting corruption, as well as the environment and human rights. He lost his seat at the 2008 election to the Democratic Liberal (PDL) candidate Şerban Rădulescu. In January 2009, President Traian Băsescu named Eckstein to the newly created post of Presidential adviser for minorities, an office the creation of which the UDMR had called for since 1990. Eckstein was the only member of his party to vote against the President's 2007 impeachment, a position he reversed some months later, during a crisis over the naming of the Justice Minister. In 2011, following the retirement of Béla Markó, he was one of three candidates who ran to become leader of the UDMR, finishing in second place with 22% of the vote and losing to Hunor Kelemen. He resigned his post of adviser that September, citing his opposition to the Roşia Montană Project, an endeavor strongly backed by Băsescu. At the 2012 local election, he ran for mayor of Cluj-Napoca, finishing third with 8.4% of the vote. He resigned from the UDMR in 2018, after the party voted for changes to the penal code proposed by the governing Social Democrats (PSD).

In the Chamber, Eckstein-Kovács was part of the Human Rights, Religious Affairs and Minorities Committee; in his first Senate term, he was on the equivalent committee in that body, as well as on the Judicial Nomination, Discipline, Immunity and Validation Committee. He also sat on that committee from 2000 to 2004 and headed it from 2004 to March 2008, when he resigned as chairman because his UDMR colleagues did not vote for National Integrity Agency legislation as sponsored by the government. He co-authored a number of legislative proposals and is a founding member of several civic associations. Eckstein has sometimes had an uneasy relationship with the rest of his party, for instance accusing it of being Romania's most misogynistic and calling for serious internal reforms. He headed the UDMR's liberal platform. Controversially, his liberal stance extends to advocating registered partnerships allowing unmarried same-sex and opposite-sex couples a number of rights, a step for which he publicly announced his support in February 2008.
