= Babeș-Bolyai University =

University in Romania

- Universitatea Babeș-Bolyai (in Romanian); Babeș-Bolyai Tudományegyetem (in Hungarian); Babeș-Bolyai Universität (in German)
- Latin: Universitas Claudiopolitana; Values: Traditio et Excellentia
- Motto: Tradition and Excellence through Culture-Science-Innovation since 1581
- Type: Public
- Established: 1959 – Babeș-Bolyai University; 1945 – Bolyai University; 1919 – King Ferdinand I University (Victor Babeș University); 1581 – Academia/Universitas Claudiopolitana
- Affiliations: Guild of European Research-Intensive Universities, Eutopia, European University Association, International Association of Universities, Agence universitaire de la Francophonie, Association of Carpathian Region Universities, Santander Network, Balkan Universities Network
- Budget: €77,237,173
- Rector: Daniel David
- President of the Senate: Florin Streteanu
- Academic staff: 1,554 (2021–2022)
- Administrative staff: 1,596 (2021–2022)
- Students: 48,620 (2021–2022)
- Undergraduates: 33,139
- Postgraduates: 9,543
- Doctoral students: 2,239
- Other students: 4,699
- Location: 1 Mihail Kogălniceanu Street, Cluj-Napoca, Romania; 46.76767°N 23.59137°E
- Campus: Urban
- Language: Romanian, Hungarian, German, English, French
- Colors: Black and white
- Website: Official website

The Babeș-Bolyai University (Romanian: Universitatea Babeș-Bolyai [ˈbabeʃ ˈbojɒ.i], Hungarian: Babeș-Bolyai Tudományegyetem, commonly known as UBB) is a public research university located in Cluj-Napoca, Romania. Established in 1581 as Academia Claudiopolitana, it underwent several reorganizations over the centuries, eventually taking its current form in 1959 through the merger of Bolyai University (founded in 1945) and Victor Babeș University (founded in 1919). It occupies the first position in the University Metaranking, initiated by the Romanian Ministry of Education and Research in 2016.

Babeș-Bolyai University is the largest Romanian university with about 50,000 students. It offers study programmes in Romanian, Hungarian, German, English, and French (as well as a smaller number of programmes at the Master's level taught in Spanish, Italian, and Japanese). The university was named, following the fusion in 1959 of the Romanian and Hungarian-language universities in Cluj, after two prominent scientists from Transylvania, the Romanian bacteriologist Victor Babeș and the Hungarian mathematician János Bolyai. It is one of the five members of the Universitaria Consortium (the group of elite Romanian universities, including UAIC, UB, ASE and UVT).

UBB is affiliated to the International Association of Universities, Guild of European Research-Intensive Universities, Eutopia, the Santander Group, the Agence universitaire de la Francophonie and the European University Association. Likewise, UBB signed the Magna Charta Universitatum and concluded partnerships with 210 universities in 50 countries. The Babeș-Bolyai University is classified as an advanced research and education university by the Ministry of Education.

== History ==
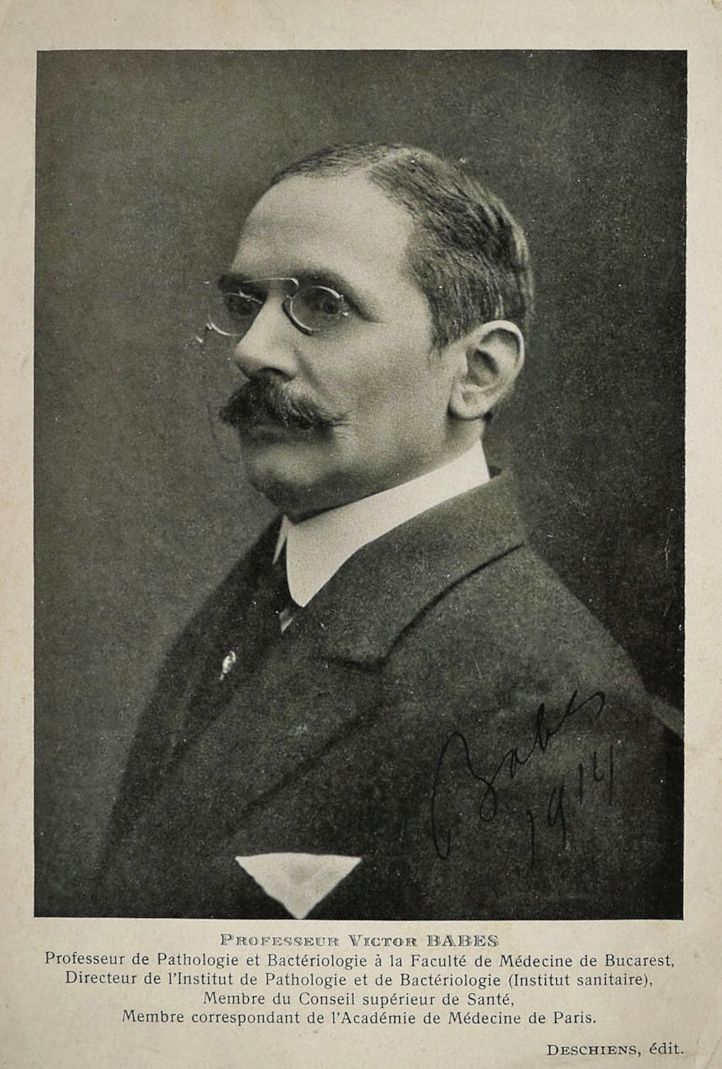
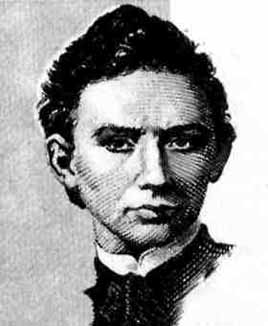
Victor Babeș (above) and János Bolyai (below), whose names the university bears.

The history of education in Cluj-Napoca (Hungarian: Kolozsvár, German: Klausenburg, Principality of Transylvania) begins in 1581, with the establishment of the Jesuit college by Stephen Báthory, King of Poland, Grand Duke of Lithuania and Prince of Transylvania. The college received buildings and land within the medieval city walls, specifically on Platea Luporum (the present Mihail Kogălniceanu Street). The first rector of the Collegium Academicum Claudiopolitanum was the Polish Jesuit priest Jakub Wujek. The institution had the rights to confer the university/academic titles of baccalaureus, magister, and doctor. In 1585, there were 230 students studying, divided into six classes. The language of instruction and learning was Latin. After 1698, the institution was named Universitas Claudiopolitana, with use of Latin and subsequently German as languages of instruction. In 1753, Empress Maria Theresa granted imperial status to the university, and in 1773, after the dissolution of the Jesuit Order, went under the administration of the Piarist order. In 1786, Universitas Claudiopolitana became the Royal Academic Lyceum (Lyceum Regium Academicum – semiuniversity statute), which was later followed by two institutions with a semiuniversity statute (e.g., offering training at baccalaureus/magister level, but not at doctor level): (a) the Surgical-Medical Institute and (b) the Academy of Law. These institutions were later incorporated in the Franz Joseph University.

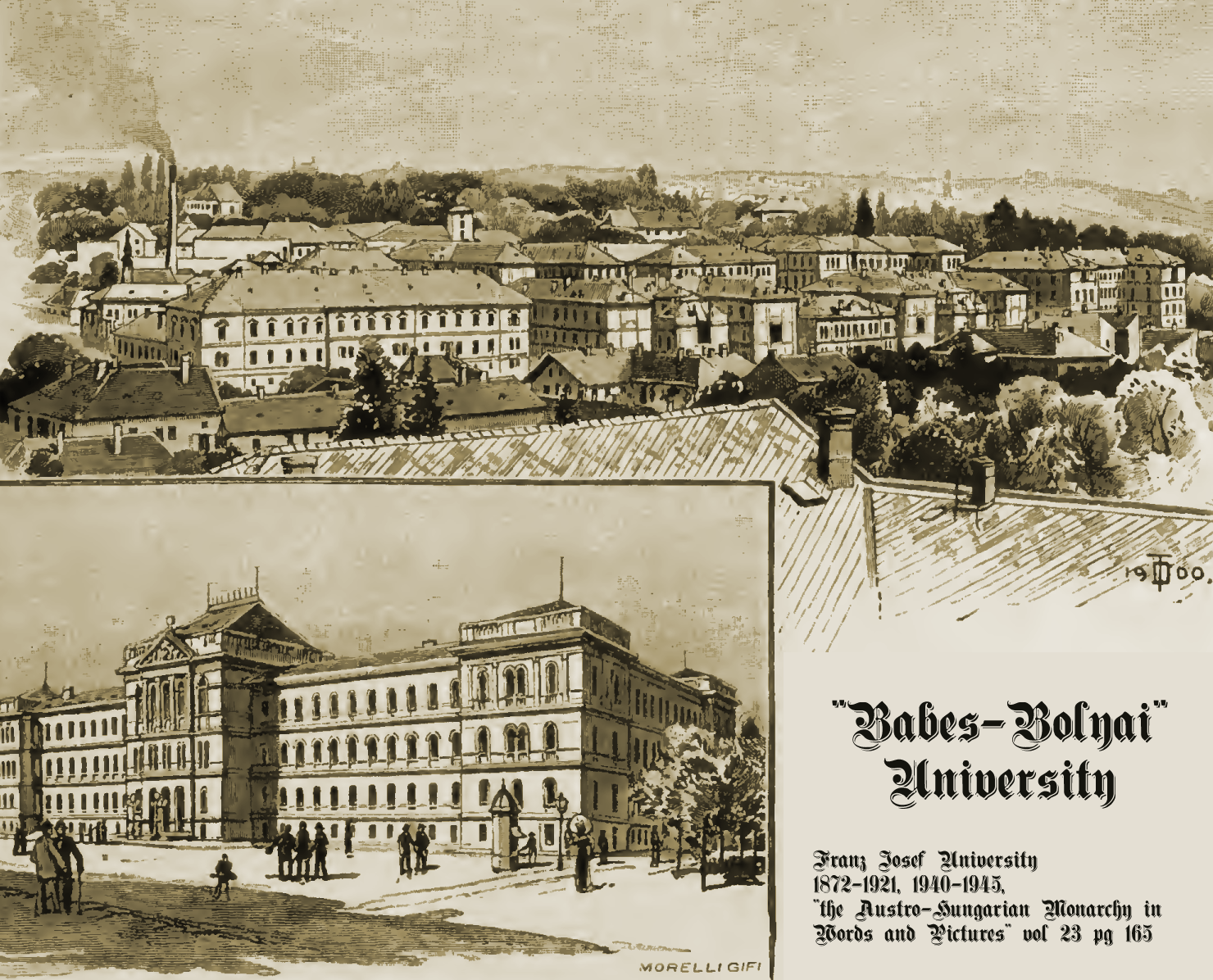
Franz Joseph University around 1900. Caption from the 23rd volume of the Austro-Hungarian Monarchy in Words and Pictures

With the affirmation of the Romanian nation in the context of the European revolutions of 1848, the issue of education in Romanian was raised. At the request of the Romanians in 1870, József Eötvös (then Minister of Education) proposed the creation in Kolozsvár of a university teaching in Hungarian, Romanian and German, idea also welcomed by the Romanian elite. This hadn't come to fruition, as Eötvös died in 1871, and in 1872, Franz Joseph I legislated the establishment of the Hungarian Royal University of Kolozsvár in Hungarian only, which caused dissatisfaction among Romanians. After the oath, on 20 December 1872, 258 students started their courses. There were created four distinct faculties: the Faculty of Law and State Sciences, the Faculty of Medicine, the Faculty of Philosophy, Letters and History, and the Faculty of Mathematics and Natural Sciences. Each possessed equal status and enjoyed internal autonomy. The first rector was Prof. Áron Berde from the Faculty of Law, specialist in economics and finance. Besides the four faculties, a Pedagogical Institute was formed for training secondary school teachers. In 1895 women were given rights to attend lectures at the university.

After the First World War, and in the context of the Great Union of 1918, the university was taken over by the Romanian authorities and became an institution of the Kingdom of Romania. On 12 September 1919, the decree signed by King Ferdinand I stipulated "the transformation of the Royal Hungarian Franz Joseph University into a Romanian university beginning on the 1st of October 1919". The Hungarian staff who had not sworn allegiance to the Romanian state moved to Szeged where they contributed to the formation of the University of Szeged (1921).

The new Romanian university, initially named Dacia Superior University (in reference to the Roman province by the same name), later King Ferdinand I University, was composed of four faculties: Law, Medicine, Sciences, Letters and Philosophy [sic]. The inaugural lecture, "The Duty of Our Life", was delivered by Vasile Pârvan on 3 November 1919. The official inauguration took place between 31 January and 2 February 1920, in the presence of King Ferdinand I of Romania. The first elected rector was Sextil Pușcariu.

In 1940, after the territorial revision imposed by the Second Vienna Award, Hungary obtained the territory of Northern Transylvania, and the Romanian university was moved to Timișoara and Sibiu. The former Hungarian university reformed in the city, out of the University of Szeged. After the end of the Second World War and the annulling of Hungary's territorial gains, on 1 June 1945, Romanian authorities returned to Cluj the King Ferdinand I University (later renamed Victor Babeș University), and established the Bolyai University, a state institution teaching in Hungarian, with four faculties (Letters [Philology] and Philosophy, Law and Political Economy, Sciences, and Human Medicine which, in 1948, was separated and moved to Târgu Mureș to form the University of Medicine and Pharmacy).

In the spring of 1959, the two educational institutions were united as the Babeș-Bolyai University, after two renowned scholars of Transylvania: Romanian physician and bacteriologist Victor Babeș (co-founder of modern microbiology) and Hungarian mathematician János Bolyai (known for developing absolute geometry). In 1995, the Babeș-Bolyai University reorganized its structure, introducing a multicultural based education.

UBB is today a complex university, having programs ranging from art/humanities, social sciences, as well as life and natural sciences, to mathematics/computer sciences alongside engineering and technology.

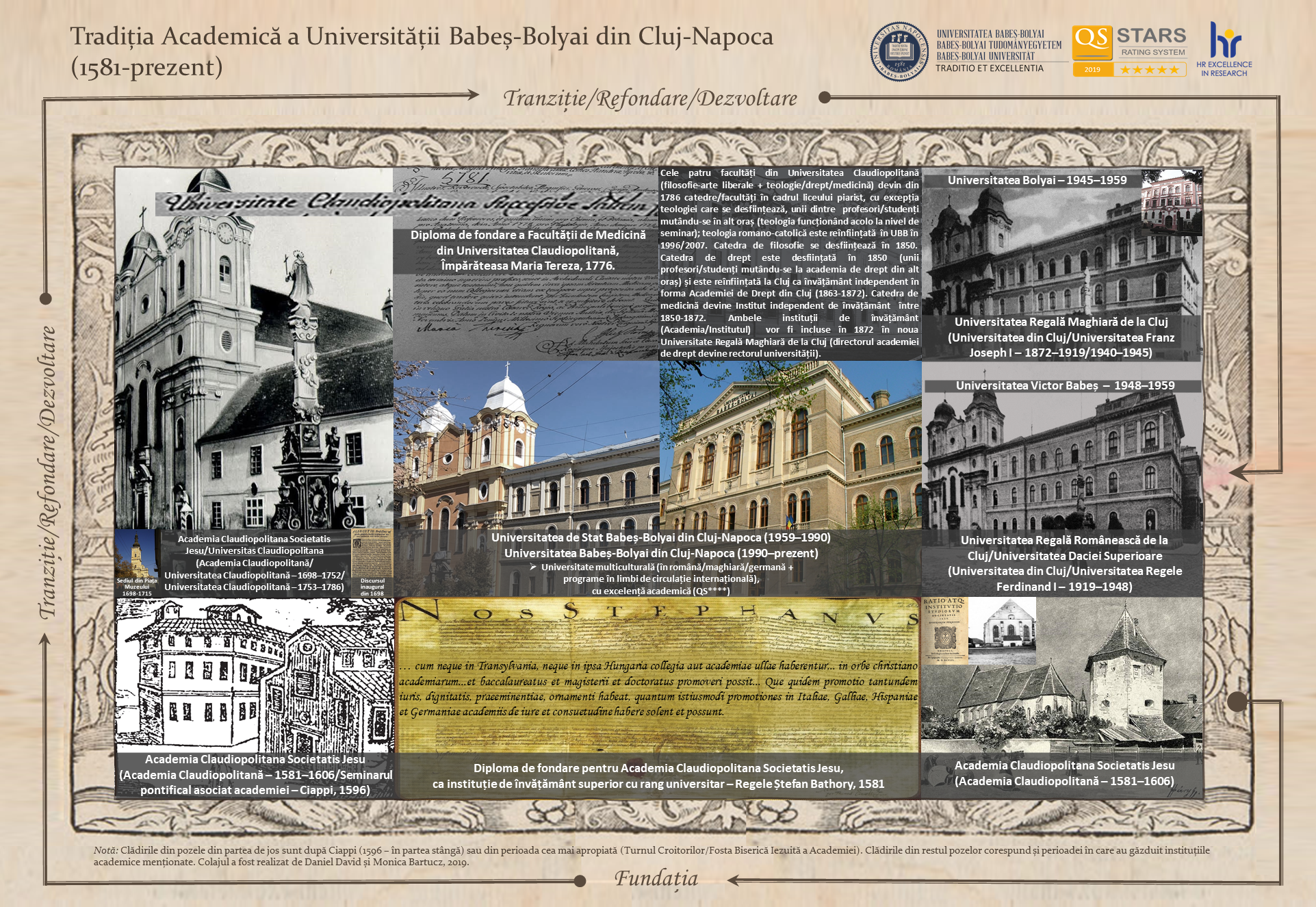
The Academic tradition of Babeș-Bolyai University

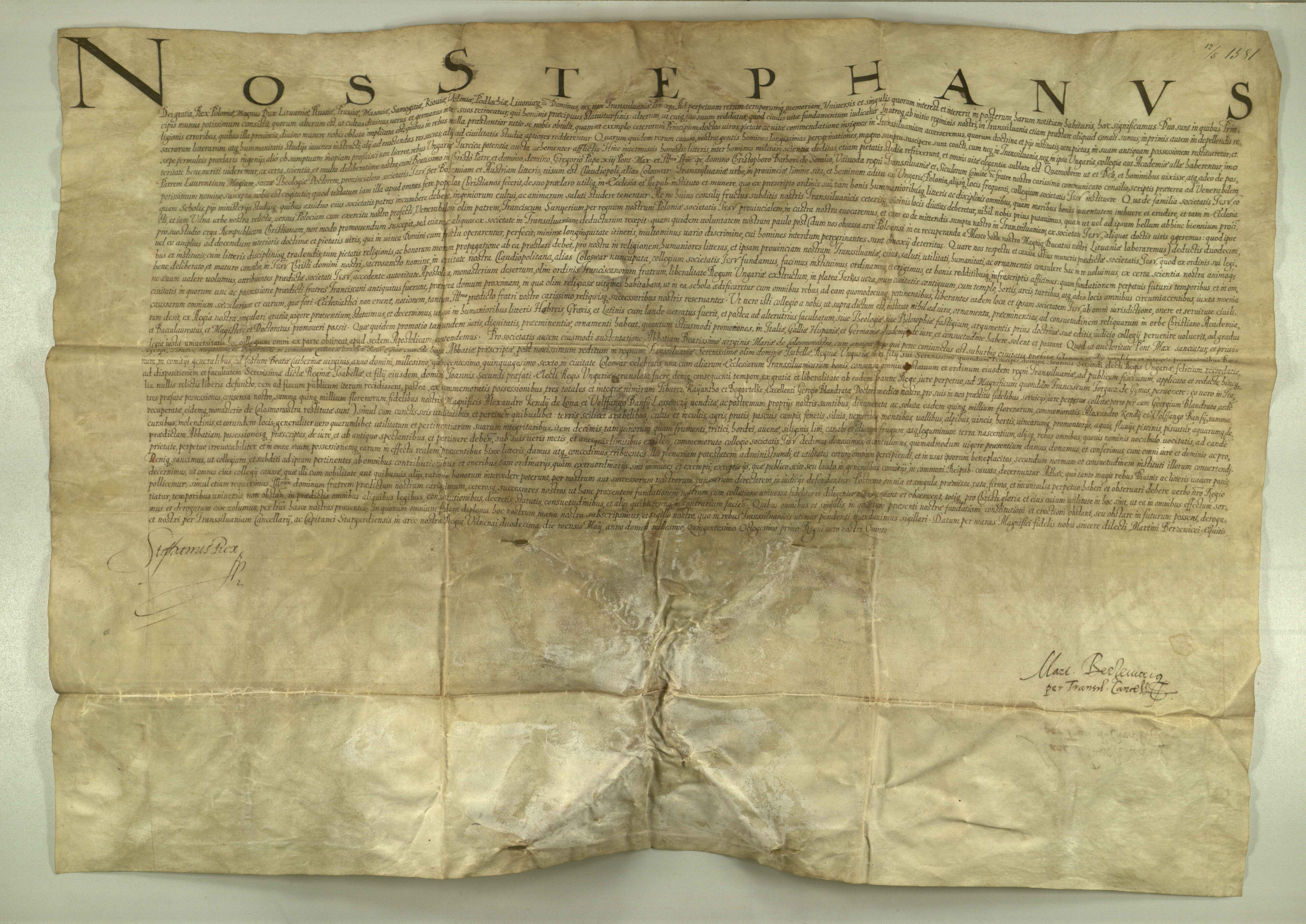
The Diploma issued by Stephan Bathory in 1581 establishing the Claudiopolitan Academy Societatis Jesu in Cluj, having the rights to confer the university/academic titles of baccalaureus, magister, and doctor.

== Campuses ==
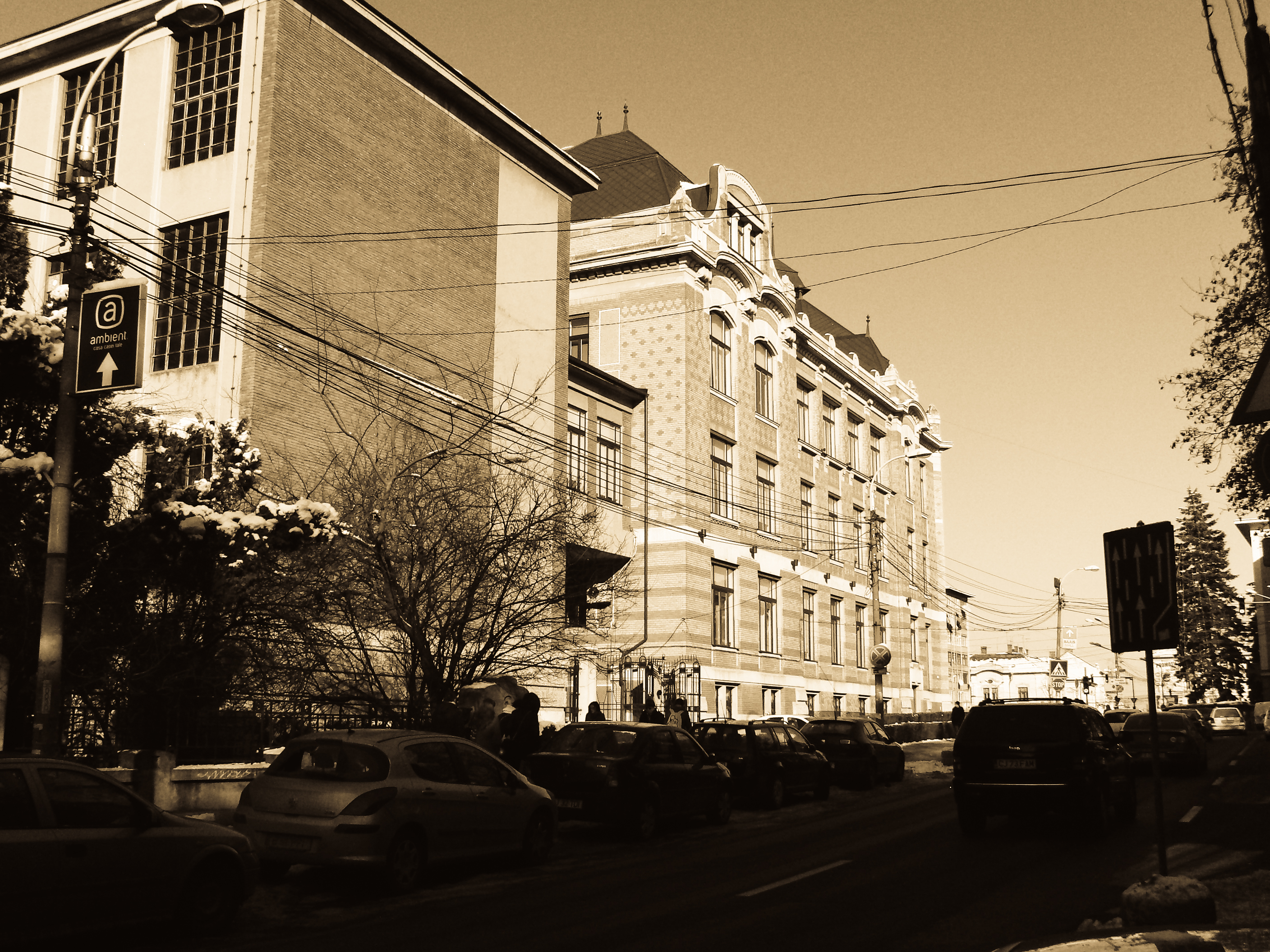
Central University Library seen from Clinicilor Street

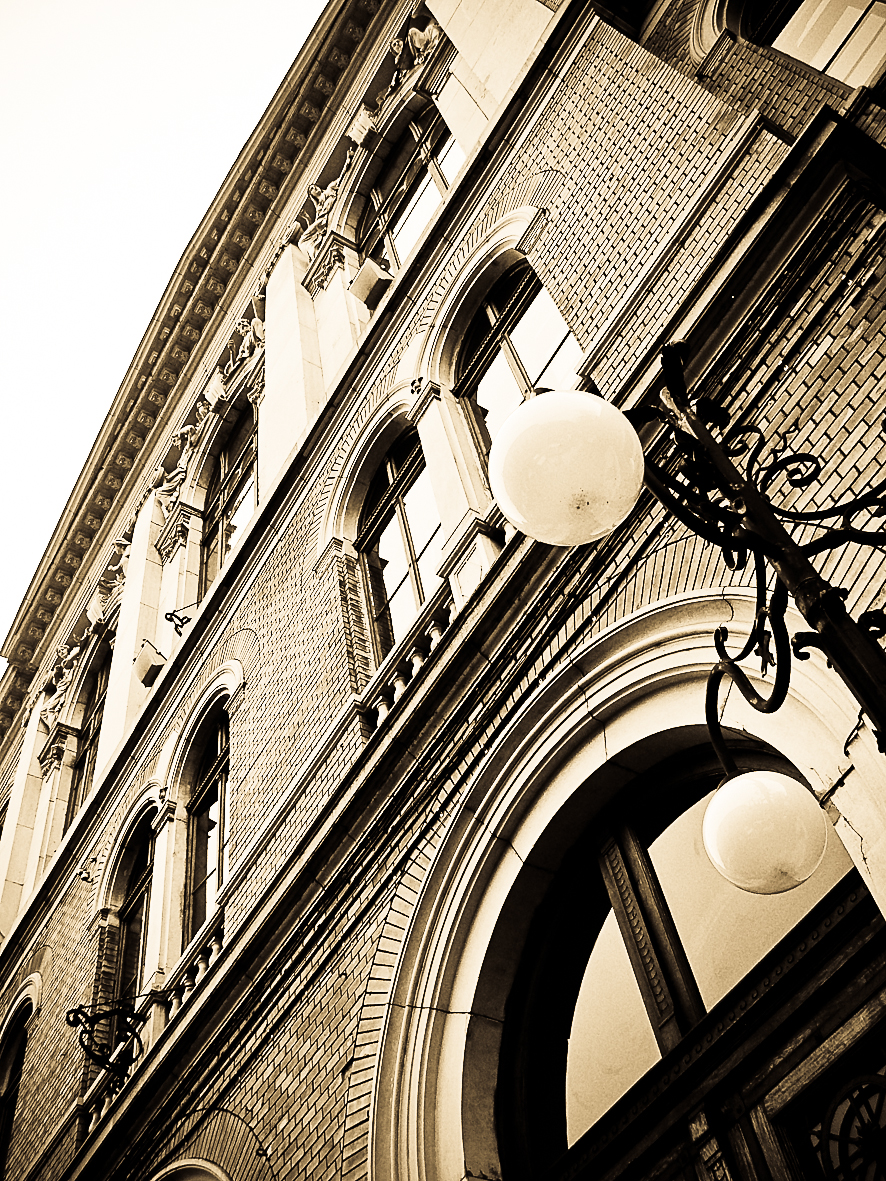
The central building of the university

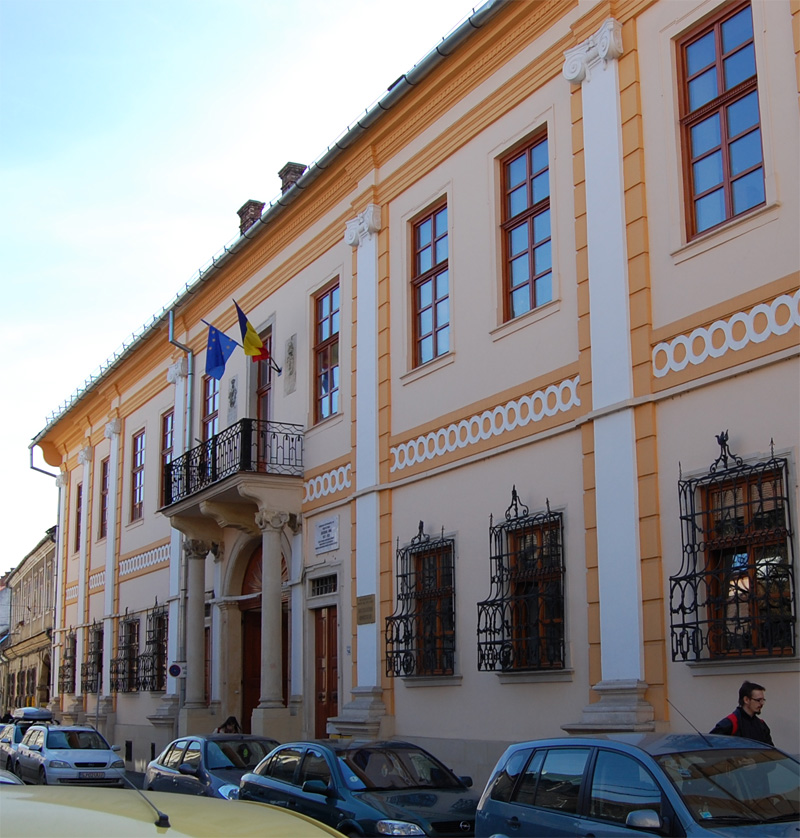
Tholdalagy-Korda Palace is the headquarters of technical administration of the Babeș-Bolyai University.

The main campus is located in the city of Cluj-Napoca, with university buildings spread across the city. The university has 17 student housing areas, totaling 5,280 residential quarters (4,964 for students, 100 for athletes and 216 for PhD); most notable are Hașdeu and Economica. All dormitories are renovated, thermally insulated, have double-glazed windows, laminate flooring and chipboard or wood furniture. The Lucian Blaga University Library is located in the city centre. The university also has several colleges located in other cities spread across the Transylvania and Maramureș historical regions.

Within the university's cultural possessions are several museums, such as the University Museum (established in April 2001, with a collection of more than 750 original and facsimile pieces), the Mineralogical Museum, the Botanical Museum, the Paleontology-Stratigraphy Museum, the Vivarium and the Zoological Museum.

== Academics ==
Babeș-Bolyai University has almost 50.000 students in 2021. Between 1993 and 2021, the number of students has quadrupled, from 12,247 in 1993 to 48,620 in 2021. The structure of the student body is composed out of 2,239 PhD students, 9,543 master's degree students, and 33,139 undergraduates. The university has 22 faculties and an academic community of over 55.000 members. It offers bachelor's, master's, and PhD degrees, along with advanced postgraduate studies. UBB is the only university in Europe that has four faculties of theology (Orthodox, Reformed, Roman Catholic, and Greek Catholic).

The university is a multicultural institution which is very well illustrated by its structure: there are 291 study programmes in Romanian (148 bachelor's studies and 143 master's studies); 110 study programmes in Hungarian (70 bachelor's studies and 40 master's studies); and 15 study programmes in German (10 bachelor's studies and 5 master's studies). The Hungarian and German minorities are proportionately represented in the Professors' Council and the University Senate.

41.5% of foreign students come from Moldova and Ukraine, 27.4% from EU and EEA, and 31.1% from non-EU and non-EEA states.

Evolution of number of students over time
Year	Number of students
1872	258
1919	1,871(+625.2%)
1938	3,094(+65.4%)
1971	14,438(+366.6%)
1989	5,940(−58.9%)
1993	12,247(+106.2%)
2003	38,048(+210.7%)
2013	40,207(+5.7%)
2014	41,136(+2.3%)
2019	44,940(+9.2%)
2021	48,620(+8.2%)

=== Faculties ===
Faculty	Address	Specializations
Faculty of Mathematics and Informatics	1 Mihail Kogălniceanu Street	3: Mathematics (ro, hu); Mathematical informatics (ro, hu, en); Informatics (ro, hu, de, en)
Faculty of Physics	1 Mihail Kogălniceanu Street	4: Physics (ro, hu); Medical physics (ro); Physical informatics (ro, hu); Technological physics (ro, hu)
Faculty of Chemistry and Chemical Engineering	11 Arany János Street	7: Food chemistry and biochemical technologies (ro); Biochemical engineering (ro); Engineering and informatics of chemical and biochemical processes (ro); Science and engineering of oxide materials and nanomaterials (ro); Engineering of inorganic substances and environmental protection (ro); Chemistry and engineering of organic substances, petrochemistry and carbochemistry (ro, hu); Chemistry (ro, hu, de)
Faculty of Geography	44 Republicii Street	5: Geography (ro, hu, de); Tourism geography (ro, hu); Territorial planning (ro, hu); Cartography (ro); Hydrology and meteorology (ro)
Faculty of Biology and Geology	5–7 Clinicilor Street	6: Biology (ro, hu); Biochemistry (ro); Ecology and environmental protection (ro, hu, de); Industrial biotechnologies (ro); Geology (ro, hu); Geological engineering (ro)
Faculty of Environmental Sciences and Engineering	30 Fântânele Street	4: Environmental science (ro, hu); Environmental geography (ro); Environmental engineering (ro); Biotechnical and ecological systems engineering (ro)
Faculty of Law	11 Avram Iancu Street	1: Law (ro)
Faculty of Literature	31 Horea Street	21: Romanian language and literature (ro); Romanian language and literature (ro as non-mother tongue); World and comparative literature (ro); Hungarian language and literature (hu); Hungarian language and literature (hu as non-mother tongue); English language and literature (ro); French language and literature (ro); German language and literature (de); Russian language and literature (ro); Ukrainian language and literature (ro); Italian language and literature (ro); Spanish language and literature (ro); Norwegian language and literature (ro); Japanese language and literature (ro); Chinese language and literature (ro); Korean language and literature (ro); Finnish language and literature (ro); Classical philology (ro); Ethnology (hu); Cultural studies (hu); Applied modern languages (ro)
Faculty of History and Philosophy	1 Mihail Kogălniceanu Street	10: History (ro, hu); Art history (ro, hu); Archeology (ro, hu); Archivistics (ro, hu); Science of information and documentation (ro, hu); Ethnology (ro); Cultural tourism (ro, hu); International relations and European studies (ro, hu, fr); Philosophy (ro, hu); Security studies (ro, en)
Faculty of Sociology and Social Assistance	128–130 21 Decembrie 1989 Boulevard	4: Sociology (ro, hu); Human resources (ro, hu); Anthropology (ro, hu); Social assistance (ro, hu)
Faculty of Psychology and Educational Sciences	7 Sindicatelor Street	4: Psychology (ro, hu); Special psychopedagogy (ro, hu); Pedagogy (ro); Pedagogy of primary and pre-school education (ro, hu)
Faculty of Economics and Business Administration	58–60 Teodor Mihali Street	11: Management (ro, hu, en); Marketing (ro, hu); Economics of commerce, tourism and services (ro); Company economy (de); Finance and banking (ro, hu, en); Accounting and management information systems (ro, fr, en); Economic informatics (ro, hu); Statistics and economic forecasting (ro); Economics and international business (ro); General economics (ro); Agricultural and environmental economics (ro)
Faculty of European Studies	1 Emmanuel de Martonne Street	4: International relations and European studies (ro, de, en); Management (ro); European administration (ro); American studies (en)
Faculty of Business	7 Horea Street	2: Business administration (ro, en); Business administration in hospitality services (ro, en)
Faculty of Political, Administrative and Communication Sciences	71 General Traian Moșoiu Street	7: Political sciences (ro, hu, en); Communication and public relations (ro, hu, de); Journalism (ro, hu, de, en); Digital media (ro); Advertising (ro); Public administration (ro); Services and policies of public health (en)
Faculty of Physical Education and Sport	7 Pandurilor Street	3: Physical and sports education (ro, hu); Sport and motric performance (ro, hu); Kinetotherapy and special motricity (ro, hu)
Faculty of Orthodox Theology	Episcop Nicolae Ivan, F. N. Street	4: Pastoral Orthodox theology (ro); Didactic Orthodox theology (ro); Orthodox theology-social assistance (ro); Sacred art (ro)
Faculty of Greek Catholic Theology	26 Moților Street	3: Greek Catholic theology-social assistance (ro); Didactic Greek Catholic theology (ro); Pastoral Greek Catholic theology (ro)
Faculty of Reformed Theology	7 Horea Street	3: Didactic Reformed theology (hu); Reformed theology-social assistance (hu); Musical pedagogy (hu)
Faculty of Roman Catholic Theology	2 Iuliu Maniu Street	4: Didactic Roman Catholic theology (hu); Roman Catholic theology-social assistance (hu); Pastoral Roman Catholic theology (hu); Religious studies (hu)
Faculty of Theatre and Television	1 Mihail Kogălniceanu Street	5: Acting (ro, hu); Directing (ro); Theatrology (ro, hu); Cinematography, photography and media (ro, hu); Filmology (ro, en)

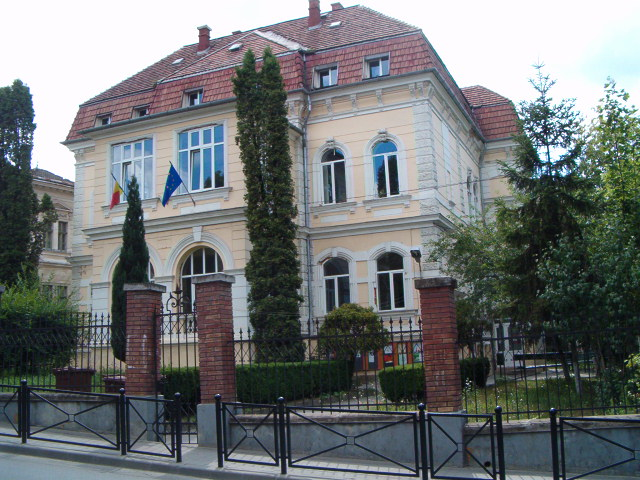
The Faculty of Psychology

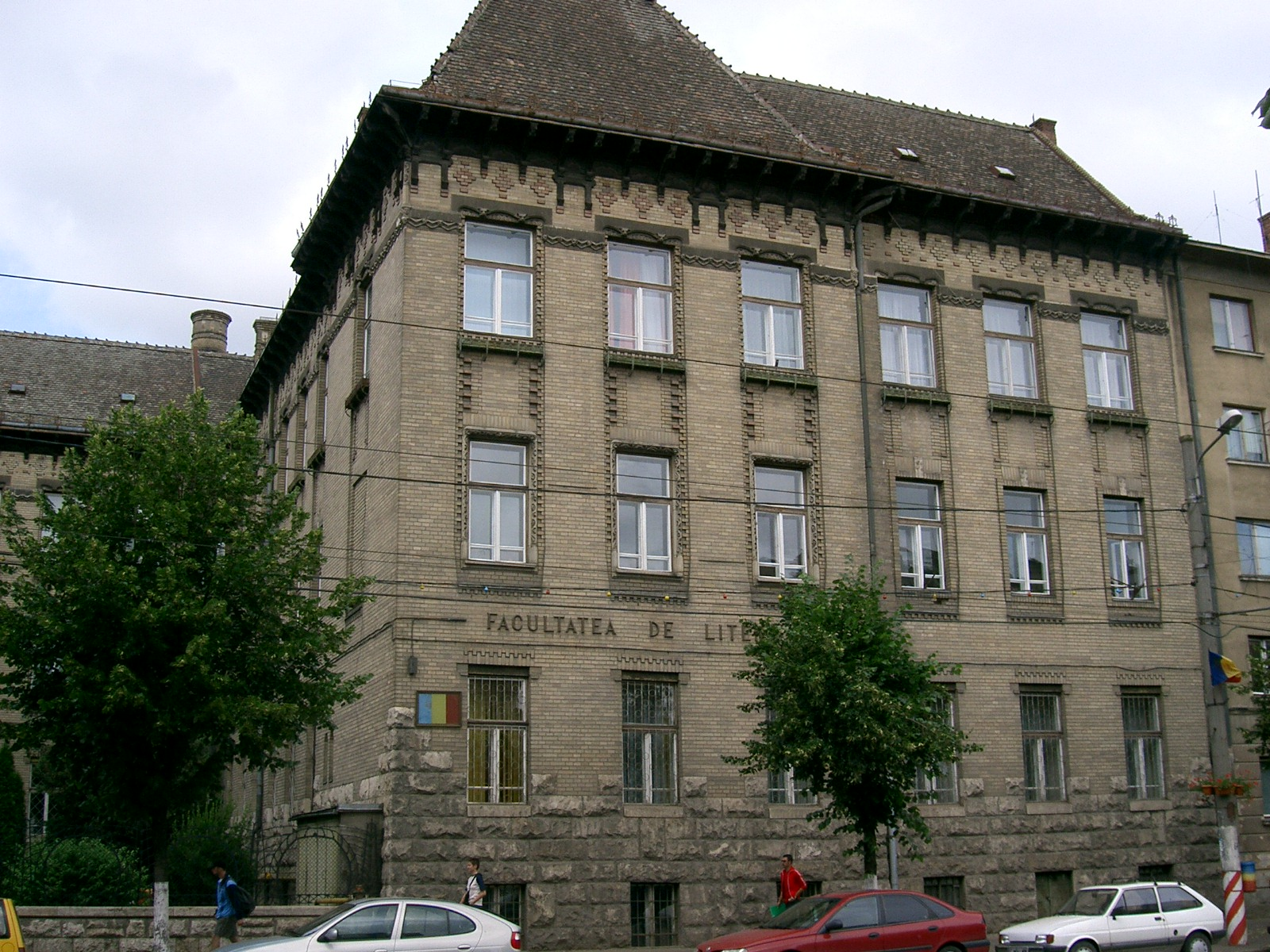
The Faculty of Letters

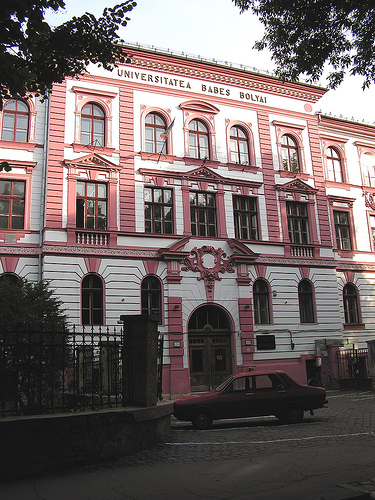
The Faculty of Chemistry

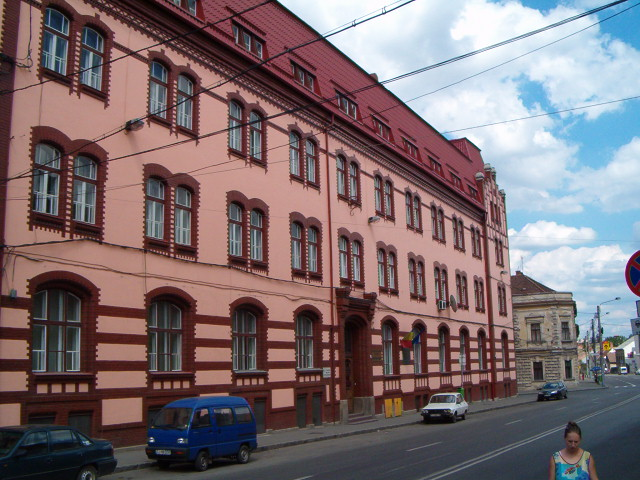
The Faculty of Law

== Ranking ==
University rankings

Global – Overall
- QS World: 761-770 (2026)
- THE World: 1001–1200 (2024)
- USNWR Global: =717 (2023)

UBB typically occupies the first position among the Romanian universities in the major international ranking of universities. In 2016, the Romanian Ministry of Education and Research commissioned the University Metaranking, combining the major international rankings of universities, as recognized by IREG). Since 2016, UBB occupies the first position among Romanian universities in the same Metaranking, although the classification process is now undertaken by the independent organization. In February 2022, the Ministry of Education issued a new methodology and metaranking, where UBB also occupied the first place. In 2019, based on British QS STAR academic audit, UBB was evaluated as an international university with excellence in teaching and research. In 2021, another QS audit granted the university a five-star rating, which is indicative of a world-class university, with an internationally recognized reputation across multiple academic fields.

== Hungarian section ==
In 1995, the Babeș-Bolyai University introduced an educational system backed by the High Commissioner on National Minorities and based on multiculturalism and multilingualism, with three lines of study (Romanian, Hungarian and German) at all levels of academic degrees.

The Hungarian section enrolls 4,874 students in 115 study programmes (75 bachelor's level and 40 master's level); the university is thus the principal institution that educates members of the Hungarian minority in Transylvania.

=== Hungarian-Romanian dispute ===
The Hungarian section of the university has a partial autonomy, gradually increasing in the recent years. However, in the opinion of the Council of the Hungarian section, those members appointed by the Hungarian-speaking teaching staff desire a more institutionalized form of autonomy. Since university decision-making is based on majority vote of the entire faculty, the Hungarian representatives in minority can always be silenced by this procedure.

In November 2006, Hantz Péter and Kovács Lehel, lecturers at the Babeș-Bolyai University, were discharged by the university after a series of actions started in October 2005 taken for language equality. They were campaigning for the re-organization of the Bolyai University by splitting it in two independent institutions. On 22 November 2006, the university organized an exhibition in the European Parliament, where they tried to give the impression that there are multilingual signs at the university. That day, Hantz added signs like "Information" and "No smoking" in Hungarian alongside those ones in Romanian. The two acted upon a decree permitting the use of multilingual signs, which had been decreed by the university but never put in practice, and official claims that the university is a multicultural institution with three working languages (Romanian, German and Hungarian). On 27 November 2006, the Senate voted for exclusion of the two lecturers, with 72 for and 9 against (from 2 Romanian and 7 Hungarian members) votes. The Hungarian academic community is convinced that the exclusion was not a disciplinary action, but the vote was not ethnic based. In spite of protests, the resignation out of solidarity by several Hungarian-speaking university staff, and a call by 24 Hungarian MEPs for the reinstatement of the lecturers, they remained unemployed. The parties in the Hungarian Parliament asked the university to reinstate the two professors and respect the rights of the Hungarian minority. The presidents of the five parties represented in the Hungarian Parliament signed a statement of protest. Istvan Hiller, the Education Minister of Hungary, wrote to his Romanian counterpart Mihail Hărdău, asking for his help on the issue. The case has also been put forward in the Parliamentary Assembly of the Council of Europe. Göran Lindblad, from the Swedish European People's Party, along with 24 signatories from 19 European countries, presented a motion for a resolution on the alleged breaching of the 1994 Framework Convention for the Protection of National Minorities by the Romanian Government.

The two lecturers sued Romania at the European Court of Human Rights (ECHR) in Strasbourg. Hantz and Kovacs turned to former Hungarian Justice Minister Albert Takács to represent them at the ECHR, eventually accepting the proposal. In 2008, the European Court of Human Rights established that the decision of UBB Senate to exclude Hantz Péter and Kovács Lehel from the teaching staff of the educational institution was legal.

In 2010, the education law has sparked numerous controversies by promoting ethnic segregation in higher education, according to teachers representatives. Anton Hadăr, president of Alma Mater Federation of Trade Unions in University Education considers that the separation of UBB on ethnic criteria would be not only risky but also unproductive. Among main disadvantages would be the increasingly serious gaps of ethnic Hungarians regarding the knowledge of Romanian language. Romanian MEP Corina Crețu warned that adopting the education law, with the claims of UDMR, would have harmful effects especially in Cluj. "Applying the law could lead to breaking UBB", stated Crețu.

== Notable people ==
=== Faculty and alumni ===
- Emil Racoviță (1868–1947), savant, explorer, speleologist and biologist
- Iuliu Hațieganu (1885–1959), physician
- Lucian Blaga (1895–1961), philosopher, poet, playwright, translator, journalist, professor, academician and diplomat
- Traian Herseni (1907–1980), sociologist, anthropologist and ethnologist
- Virgil I. Bărbat (1879–1931), sociologist
- Ilona Borsai (1924–1982), musicologist, music historian, folk music researcher
- Adeyemi Ikuforiji (b. 1958), economist and politician
- Ákos Birtalan (b. 1962), Minister of Tourism
- Ana Blandiana (b. 1942), writer and civil rights activist
- Anatol E. Baconsky (1925–1977), essayist, poet, novelist, journalist, literary theorist and translator
- Andrian Candu (b. 1975), President of the Moldovan Parliament
- Anneli Ute Gabanyi (b. 1942), political scientist, literary critic, journalist and philologist
- Áron Tamási (1897–1966), writer
- Camil Mureșanu (1927–2015), historian
- Corneliu Coposu (1914–1995), founder of the Christian Democratic National Peasants' Party
- Daniel Barbu (b. 1957), historian, senator and Minister of Culture
- Daniel David (b. 1972), psychologist and Rector of the UBB
- Daniel Morar (b. 1966), Head of the National Anticorruption Directorate and Romania's Constitutional Court Judge
- Dumitru Găleșanu (b. 1955), jurist, writer and poet-philosopher
- Dumitru Radu Popescu (b. 1935), writer, playwright, scenarist and academician
- Eduard Hellvig (b. 1974), MEP, Minister of Tourism and Director of the Romanian Intelligence Service
- Emil Boc (b. 1966), Prime Minister of Romania and Mayor of Cluj-Napoca
- Emil Hurezeanu (b. 1955), writer, publicist and journalist
- Florin Șerban (b. 1975), film director
- Franz Halberg (1919–2013), scientist and one of the founders of modern chronobiology
- Gabriela Szabó (b. 1975), Olympic athlete and Minister of Youth and Sport
- Gavril Dejeu (b. 1932), lawyer and Interior Minister
- George Coșbuc (1866–1918), poet, literary critic and translator
- George Maior (b. 1967), Director of the Romanian Intelligence Service
- Gheorghe Mureșan (b. 1971), basketball player
- György Frunda (b. 1951), politician
- Hermann Oberth (1894–1989), one of the founding fathers of rocket and astronautics
- Hunor Kelemen (b. 1967), Minister of Culture
- Ioan Gyuri Pascu (1961–2016), musician and actor
- Ioan Oltean (b. 1953), Minister of Environment
- Ion Cârja (1922–1977), writer and political prisoner
- Ion Rațiu (1917–2000), politician
- Ionel Haiduc (b. 1937), chemist, professor and academician
- Iuliu Maniu (1873–1953), Prime Minister of Romania
- Klaus Iohannis (b. 1959), Mayor of Sibiu and President of Romania
- Laura Codruța Kövesi (b. 1973), Chief Prosecutor of the National Anticorruption Directorate
- Maria Berényi (b. 1959), historian and poet
- Mircea Miclea (b. 1963), Minister of Education
- Ovidiu Pecican (b. 1959), writer, historian and publicist
- Pavel Bartoș (b. 1975), actor, comic and TV star
- Péter Eckstein-Kovács (b. 1956), senator and presidential adviser
- Sándor Kányádi (b. 1929), poet
- Sandra Izbașa (b. 1990), Olympic gymnast
- Ștefan Augustin Doinaș (1922–2002), poet, essayist, translator, political prisoner, academician and politician
- Mihail Neamțu, (.b 1978), theologian and politician
- Simona Hunyadi Murph, scientist, engineer, inventor, adjunct professor
- Vasile Dîncu (b. 1961), politician and sociologist
- Vasile Pușcaș (b. 1952), professor, diplomat and politician
- Victor Ciorbea (b. 1954), Mayor of Bucharest and Prime Minister of Romania
- Victor Neumann (b. 1953), historian, philosopher of culture and professor

=== Honorary degree ===
Doctor Honoris Causa, Professor Honoris Causa include a long list of public personalities, such as:

- Angela Merkel
- Pope Benedict XVI
- Patriarch Bartholomew I of Constantinople
- King Michael I of Romania
- Mario Vargas Llosa
- Ahmed Zewail
- Jean-Marie Lehn
- George Andrew Olah
- George Emil Palade

=== Rectors ===
- Sextil Pușcariu (1919–1920)
- Vasile Dumitriu (1920–1921)
- Dimitrie Călugăreanu (1921–1922)
- Iacob Iacobovici (1922–1923)
- Nicolae Bănescu (1923–1924)
- Camil Negrea (1924–1925)
- Gheorghe Spacu (1925–1926)
- Ioan Minea (1926–1927)
- Gheorghe Bogdan-Duică (1927–1928)
- Emil Hațieganu (1928–1929)
- Emil Racoviță (1929–1930)
- Iuliu Hațieganu (1930–1931)
- Nicolae Drăganu (1931–1932)
- Florian Ștefănescu-Goangă (1932–1940)
- Sextil Pușcariu (1940–1941)
- Iuliu Hațieganu (1941–1944)
- Alexandru Borza (1944–1945)
- Emil Petrovici (1945–1951)
- Raluca Ripan (1951–1956)
- Constantin Daicoviciu (1956–1968)
- Ștefan Pascu (1968–1976)
- Ion Vlad (1976–1984)
- Aurel Negucioiu (1984–1989)
- Ionel Haiduc (1990–1993)
- Andrei Marga (1993–2004)
- Nicolae Bocșan (2004–2008)
- Andrei Marga (2008–2012)
- Ioan-Aurel Pop (2012–2020)
- Daniel David (2020–present)

== Controversies ==
On June 20, 2025, a student from Babeș-Bolyai University was involved in a violent incident during a written examination, in which he physically assaulted a doctoral teaching assistant. The student was reportedly employed by the local police force in Cluj-Napoca at the time. The incident sparked public debate regarding student conduct, institutional safety, and the responsibilities of public servants enrolled in higher education. University and law enforcement authorities initiated internal investigations following the event.

== See also ==
- Balkan Universities Network
- Iuliu Haţieganu University of Medicine and Pharmacy
- List of modern universities in Europe (1801–1945)
- List of Jesuit sites
