= Victor Ciorbea =

56th Prime Minister of Romania from 1996–1998

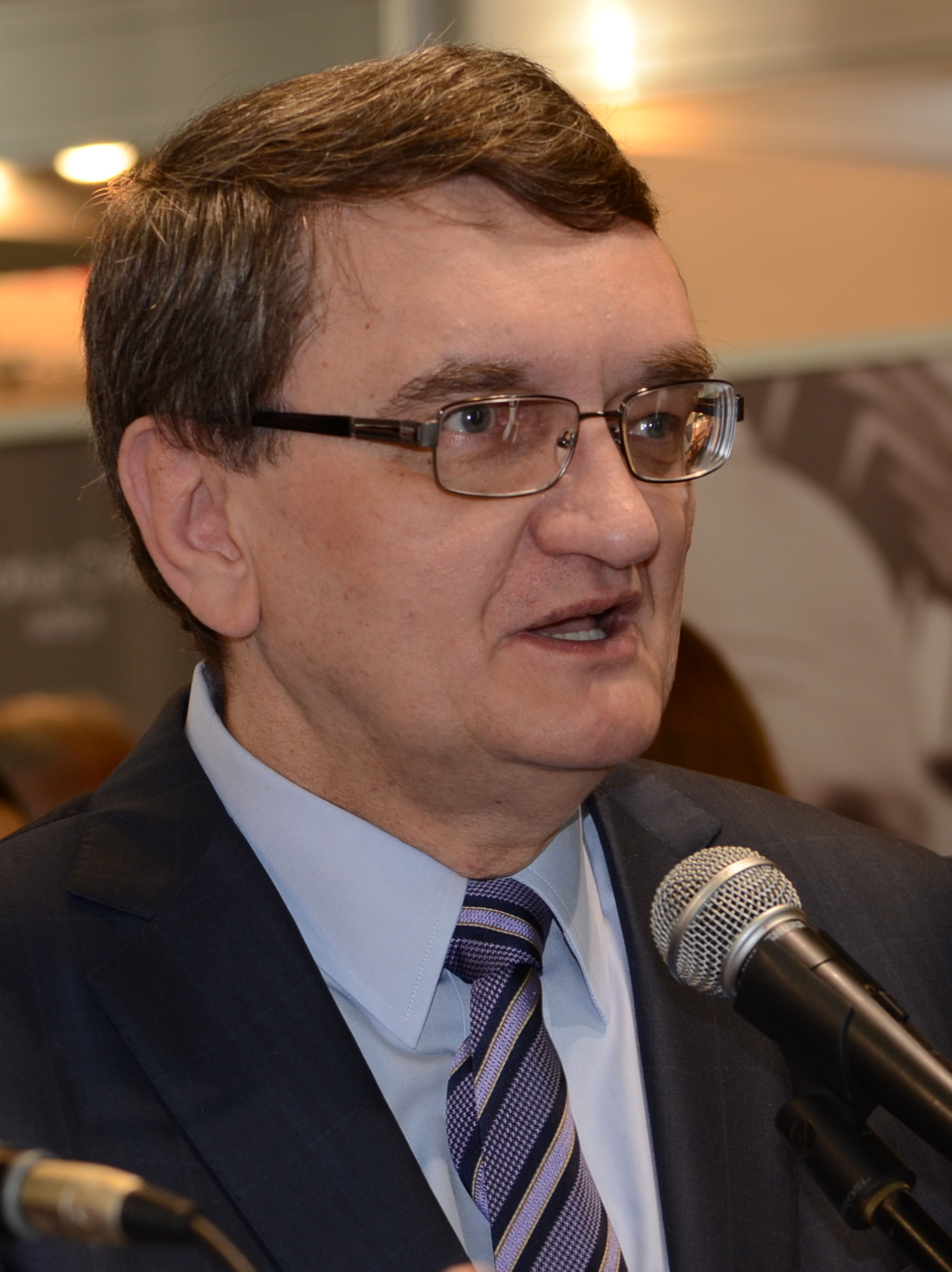
- Ciorbea in 2013

Prime Minister of Romania
- In office 12 December 1996 – 30 March 1998
- President: Emil Constantinescu
- Preceded by: Nicolae Văcăroiu
- Succeeded by: Gavril Dejeu (interim); Radu Vasile

Ombudsman
- In office 8 April 2014 – 26 June 2019
- Succeeded by: Renate Weber

Member of the Senate of Romania
- In office 19 December 2012 – 8 April 2014

General Mayor of Bucharest
- In office 19 June 1996 – 12 December 1996
- Preceded by: Crin Halaicu
- Succeeded by: Viorel Lis (interim)

Leader of the Christian Democratic National Peasants' Party
- In office 2002–2004
- Preceded by: Andrei Marga
- Succeeded by: Gheorghe Ciuhandu

Personal details
- Born: 26 October 1954 (age 71) Ponor, Romanian People's Republic
- Party: None
- Other political affiliations: Christian Democratic National Peasants' Party (1989–2012); National Liberal Party (2012–2014)
- Education: Babeș-Bolyai University; University of Bucharest; Case Western Reserve University
- Profession: Jurist

Victor Ciorbea (Note: Romanian pronunciation: [ˈviktor ˈtʃjorbe̯a]) (born 26 October 1954) is a Romanian jurist, politician, and civil/public servant. He was the Mayor of Bucharest between 1996 and 1997 and, after his resignation from this public dignity/position, Prime Minister of Romania from 12 December 1996 to 30 March 1998. He had also served as the Ombudsman between 2014 and 2019.

== Biography ==
Born in Ponor, Alba County on 26 October 1954, Ciorbea trained as a jurist, graduating from Babeș-Bolyai University in Cluj-Napoca in 1979. He worked for the municipal tribunal in Bucharest, as well as lecturing in Law at the University of Bucharest. He was awarded a doctorate in Law by the University of Bucharest, and later specialized in management at Case Western Reserve University in the United States (1992).

Originally a trade unionist (between 1990 and 1996, he was leader of the Federation of Free Trade Unions in Education, FSLI, and, between 1990 and 1993, leader of the nationwide National Confederation of Free Trade Unions of Romania – Brotherhood) and member of the National Peasants' Party (PNȚ-CD). He was backed for the premiership by the Romanian Democratic Convention (CDR) after the elections of 1996. Ciorbea enforced several measures in order to advance Romania's transition toward a market economy, including an austerity budget, following a program known as Contractul cu România ("Contract with Romania").

He resigned following a conflict with PNȚ-CD leader Ion Diaconescu, moving on to found the minor Alianța Natională Creștin Democrată (the National Christian Democratic Alliance, ANCD), which merged back into the PNȚ-CD after the latter lost the 2000 elections, and soon after became leader of the reunited party.

Faced with the task of regaining voter confidence, Ciorbea resigned his party office in 2004, in favour of Gheorghe Ciuhandu, the Mayor of Timișoara. Following the latter's nomination, the party became the Christian Democratic National Peasants' Party (PNȚ-CD).

In 2012, as a member of National Liberal Party (PNL), he was elected as senator. In April 2014, without the support of his own party colleagues, but with the help of the ruling PSD, he became Ombudsman.

== Honours ==
=== National honours ===
- (Romania) Romanian Royal Family: Knight of the Royal Decoration of Nihil Sine Deo

== Electoral history ==
=== Mayor of Bucharest ===
Election	Affiliation	First round			Second round			
Election	Affiliation	Votes	Percentage	Position	Votes	Percentage	Position	
1996	CDR	—N/a	39.61%	1st	—N/a	56.74%	1st	
2004	PNȚ-CD	9,819	1.3%	5th				—N/a

== See also ==
- List of Case Western people
- Ciorbea Cabinet

Political offices
Preceded by Nicolae Văcăroiu	Prime Minister of Romania; 1996–1998	Succeeded by Gavril Dejeu; Acting
