= Romanian Ombudsman =

Government institution

The Romanian Ombudsman (Avocatul Poporului in Romanian, literally meaning "People's Advocate") is an independent institution of the Government of Romania, responsible for investigating and addressing complaints made by citizens against other government institutions.

== History ==
The People's Advocate Institution is organized and functions according to the provisions of art. 58-60 of the Constitution of Romania, republished, of Law no. 35/1997 on the organization and functioning of the People's Advocate Institution, republished, as subsequently amended and supplemented, and of the People's Advocate. The Ombudsman Institution was set up in Sweden in 1809 by the Parliament, which introduced the "Parliamentary Ombudsman's Office" into the new Constitution as a tool to allow Parliament to exercise some control over the exercise of power by the executive. This institution is one of the most important guarantees of human rights and freedoms available to citizens. The term "ombudsman" means a representative, delegate or agent. In the specialized legal literature, the Ombudsman has been defined as a form of independent control of public authorities or as an extraordinary public administration control body, which is outside the normal procedures for his or her attack.

The institution of the ombudsman type is developed in two forms:

• Ombudsman with general competence - addresses all issues arising from malfunctions in the administration

• Specialized ombudsman - specialized in certain areas (eg Child Protection Ombudsman, Consumer Ombudsman, Financial Services Ombudsman, Ombudsman for Equality and Anti-Discrimination, Ombudsman for People with Disabilities, Ombudsman for Defense, etc.).

As regards the Romanian Ombudsman institution, the Romanian Constituent has opted for the appointment of the People's Advocate, a lawyer with general competence, whose purpose is to protect the rights and freedoms of individuals in their relations with public authorities. The People's Advocate Institution was one of the new institutional structures created by the 1991 Constitution, together with the Constitutional Court, aimed at defending the rights and freedoms of individuals in their relations with public administration authorities.

The Romanian Ombudsman was established in 1991 after the ratification of the country's first post-communist constitution. Initially, the ombudsman was appointed by the Senate for a four-year term. After the Constitutional Amendment of 2003, the ombudsman is appointed for a term of five years, by both chambers of the Parliament (the Chamber of Deputies and Senate), to which it reports every year or at their request.

== Appointment procedure ==
According to art. 58 par. (1) and Art. 65 lit. i) from the Romanian Constitution, the People's Advocate is appointed in the joint sitting of the two Chambers of Parliament for a term of 5 years for the defense of fundamental rights and freedoms of individuals, with the possibility of renewing the mandate only once. During his term of office, the People's Advocate cannot perform any other public or private function, except that of teaching staff in higher education. The People's Advocate may address any natural person regardless of citizenship, age, gender, ethnicity, political or religious affiliation, when considered to be in violation of his rights and freedoms by a public administration body through an unlawful administrative act or fact. The ombudsman is aided by a number of assistants (adjuncţi) specialized in legal domains such as women's rights, minority rights, children's rights, police issues, property, industrial relations, and taxation.

The Ombudsman exercises their functions either ex officio or at the request of the persons concerned. For the work to be effective, the constitution obliges public authorities to provide the necessary support. The People's Advocate is only responding to Parliament, being required to report to him. In these reports, the lawyer of the people can also make recommendations about legislation or taking measures to protect public freedoms. The principle of the independence of the People's Advocate against any public authority is enshrined. Also, in the organic law it is stated that in the exercise of its attributions, the People's Advocate does not substitute for the public authorities. In other words, no one can oblige the People's Advocate to obey his instructions or provisions.

As for the People's Advocate Deputy, they are organized in different fields of activity. According to law no. 35/1997, the 5 fields of specialization of the Deputy People's Advocates are:

• human rights, equal opportunities for women and men, religious cults and national minorities

• Preventing torture and other cruel, inhuman and degrading treatment in detention facilities

• property, labor, social protection, taxes and fees

• rights of the child, family, young people, pensioners, people with disabilities

• army, justice, police, prisons

Advocates of the People's Advocate are appointed by the Standing Bureaus of the Chamber of Deputies and the Senate, but with the opinion of the legal committees of the two Chambers.

== Activity ==
The following general features of the institution are identified:

• the purpose of protecting fundamental rights and freedoms

• independence from other state authorities

• referral both ex officio and on request

• Various means of action (as a common feature, the Ombudsman cannot cancel or modify controlled acts)

In the Ombudsman's institution, we know a typological diversity resulting from the following classification: public, private, unipersonal, pluripersonally, multipurpose or specialized ombudsman at national, regional or local level. The public ombudsman is designated by public authorities such as the Parliament, and those deprived by private individuals such as banks, universities, etc. The pluripersonal Ombudsman is exercised by several people, usually specialized in fields, and the one-person one person by one person. Also, the competent person exercises control over the area of competence conferred by the Constitution. They are not subject to the People's Advocate Institution's activity and will be unjustifiably rejected by petitions regarding:

• acts issued by the Chamber of Deputies, the Senate or the Parliament;

• acts and deeds of deputies and senators;

• the acts and deeds of the President of Romania;

• acts and facts of the Constitutional Court;

• the acts and deeds of the President of the Legislative Council;

• acts and actions of the judicial authority; -

• acts and deeds of the Government except for laws and ordinances.

In addition to the general jurisdiction to deal with requests addressed to it, the People's Advocate has a number of special powers. That's it

• has the right to notify the Constitutional Court of the unconstitutionality of a law before promulgation

• may bring the matter to the High Court of Cassation and Justice with an appeal in the interest of the law

• has the right to refer to the Constitutional Court an exception of unconstitutionality

• may bring an action before the administrative litigation

• there is an obligation on the Constitutional Court to request the views of the People's Advocate in the cases concerning the protection of fundamental rights.

Petitions addressed to the People's Advocate are exempt from stamp duty. They must be in writing and indicate the names and addresses of each individual injured in their rights and freedoms, the rights and freedoms violated, as well as the administrative authority or civil servant concerned. Anonymous petitions will not be considered. The time limit for referring the People's Advocate shall be no more than one year from the date on which violations of rights and freedoms occurred or from the date on which the person concerned became aware of them.

== Acts of the People's Advocate ==
The People's Advocate acts are recommendations and reports. Firstly, the recommendations are the legal acts by which this institution exercises its tasks in dealing with petitioners and public administration authorities. Through these acts, the People's Advocate notifies the public authority about the illegality of the administrative acts or deeds, or informs the Parliament, the presidents of the two Chambers or the Prime Minister about his proposals for improving or amending or supplementing the legislation, as well as any other necessary measures the protection of human rights and fundamental freedoms. Recommendations do not have legally binding force and are not subject to parliamentary or judicial control. Secondly, the reports are those legal acts presented by the Ombudsman annually or occasionally, ex officio or at the request of the Parliament. An annual report contains references to the activity of the institution per calendar year and is presented to the two Chambers in a joint meeting. On the other hand, special reports may be submitted on request and refer to the work of the institution or may contain recommendations on changes to the legislation. These are addressed to the Prime Minister or the Presidents of the two Chambers. The People's Advocate acts are not binding. Because of this, the doctrine has seen a decrease in the real effectiveness of this institution.

In 2010, the People's Advocate awarded 17,470 audiences, registered 8,895 petitions claiming violation of some citizens' rights and freedoms and was contacted by telephone by the beneficiaries 6,928 times. As a result of these complaints, the institution carried out 18 investigations and issued a recommendation, these being the two "institution-specific intervention means", according to the law. In 2010, the People's Advocate had allocated a budget of 5.5 million lei. Between May 2001 and May 2011, Ioan Muraru, a professor of Constitutional Law and Political Institutions at the Faculty of Law of the University of Bucharest, held the People's Advocate.

The current ombudsman is Renate Weber. The office of the ombudsman is in Bucharest, at 3 Eugenia Carada St (in Sector 3). The institution also has branch offices in 14 regional centres (Alba Iulia, Bacău, Braşov, Constanţa, Cluj-Napoca, Craiova, Galaţi, Iaşi, Oradea, Piteşti, Ploieşti, Suceava, Târgu-Mureş, and Timișoara).
