= Valentin Ionescu =

Romanian lawyer (born 1961)

Valentin Marian Ionescu (born September 3, 1961, in Bucharest, Romania) is a Romanian lawyer, former presidential advisor to the President of Romania Emil Constantinescu (between September 5, 1997, and December 12, 1997) and subsequently Minister of Privatization (December 1997 - April 14, 1998).

== Other career details ==
Ionescu graduated in 1991 from the University of Bucharest's Law School with a diploma thesis titled “Leasing Operations in International Trade”. In 1992, Ionescu became politically active in the Youth Organization of NPP-CD (National Peasants Party - Christian and Democrat).

From January 1997 until his nomination as presidential advisor (September 1997), he was the President of the National Privatization Agency (NPA). In this capacity and later on as Minister of Privatization, Ionescu initiated several policies, such as the Leasing Act, Franchising Act, Commodity Exchange Act, Venture Capital Act, as a means to supporting the development and consolidation of the private sector in Romania. Moreover, he initiated the review of the entire privatization legal framework in the manufacturing industry and services, which is claimed to have given impetus to the denationalization of the economy between 1997 and 1999. After the setting up of the Cabinet headed by Prime Minister Radu Vasile, Ionescu withdrew from the centre of political power.

In 1999, Ionescu left the NPP-CD and became active in the URF (Union of the Rightist Forces). In 2000, after the conclusion of the alliance between URF and NPP-CD, Ionescu joined the National Liberal Party (NLP). He was a member of the Party leadership between September 2002 and February 2005.

Since 2007, Ionescu has been a member of the PD-L (Democrat-Liberal Party).

== General sources ==
- Official Gazette of Romania, Part I, between 1997 - 1998 (Romanian);
- Romanian Newspapers, between 1997 - 2009 (Romanian);
- National Liberal Party website (Romanian).
