= Mircea Ciumara =

Romanian politician

Mircea Ciumara (13 September 1943, Călărași, Călărași County, Kingdom of Romania–13 January 2012, Bucharest, Romania) was a Romanian politician and former cabinet minister in two governments led by the Romanian Democratic Convention (CDR), the first one under Prime Minister Victor Ciorbea and the second under Mugur Isărescu. A member of the Christian Democratic National Peasants' Party (PNȚ-CD), he was a member of the Chamber of Deputies from 1992 to 2000. In the Ciorbea I Cabinet, he served as Minister of Finance from 1996 to 1997, and Minister of Industry and Commerce from 1997 to 1998. In the Isărescu I Cabinet, he was a Minister of State from 1999 to 2000.

Political activity

- member of PNȚCD (since December 1989),
- substitute member of the Office of Management, Coordination and Control of PNȚCD;
- vice president of PNȚCD;
- president of the Capital Organization of PNȚCD;
- December 1996 - December 1997 - Minister of State, Minister of Finance, Vice President of the International Bank for Reconstruction and Development.
- December 1997 - April 1998 - Minister of State, Minister of Industry and Trade.
- December 1999 - December 2000 - Minister of State, President of the Economic and Financial Coordination Council, Minister for Relations with the Parliament.
