= Gavril Dejeu =

Romanian politician

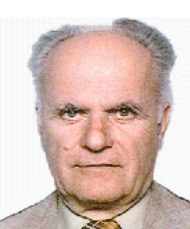

Prime Minister of Romania Acting
- In office 30 March 1998 – 17 April 1998
- President: Emil Constantinescu
- Preceded by: Victor Ciorbea
- Succeeded by: Radu Vasile

Minister of the Interior
- In office 12 December 1996 – 21 January 1999
- Prime Minister: Victor Ciorbea; Radu Vasile
- Preceded by: Doru Ioan Tărăcilă
- Succeeded by: Constantin Dudu Ionescu

Personal details
- Born: 11 September 1932 (age 94) Poieni, Cluj County Romania
- Party: Christian Democratic National Peasants' Party (1989–present)
- Other political affiliations: National Peasants' Party (Before 1989)
- Spouse: Elena Dejeu
- Education: Babeș-Bolyai University (UBB)
- Profession: Lawyer

Gavril Dejeu (Note: Romanian pronunciation: [ɡaˈvril deˈʒew]) (born 11 September 1932) is a Romanian politician who served as Minister of Interior in Victor Ciorbea's cabinet. He was also acting (or ad interim) Prime Minister of Romania from 30 March to 17 April 1998.

Born in Poieni, Cluj County, Kingdom of Romania, he graduated from Babeș-Bolyai University (UBB) in Law. Dejeu subsequently joined the Christian Democratic National Peasants' Party (PNȚCD) in 1989, in the wake of the Romanian Revolution, serving in the Chamber of Deputies from 1992 to 2000. He and his wife Elena have one daughter, Flavia Vlad.

He is one of the few former MPs and former high ranking political office holders in Romania who gave up his special pension.

Political offices
Preceded by Victor Ciorbea	Prime Minister of Romania; Acting; 1998	Succeeded by Radu Vasile
