= Nicolae Bocșan =

Romanian historian (1947–2016)

- Born: Nicolae Bocșan; 24 September 1947; Bocșa, Caraș-Severin County, Romania
- Died: 19 June 2016 (aged 68)
- Education: Babeș-Bolyai University
- Occupations: Historian; university professor

Nicolae Bocșan (24 September 1947 – 19 June 2016) was a Romanian historian who specialized in the history of the Eastern Orthodox Church in the Banat and Transylvania and who also wrote extensively about the Revolution of 1848 in Transylvania. He was a member of the history faculty of the Babeș-Bolyai University and served as rector of the university 2004–2008.

== Selection from bibliography ==
- Bocşan, Nicolae (2015). "Illyrian privileges and the Romanians from the Banat" (PDF). Banatica. 25: 243–258.
