= Oana Țoiu =

Romanian politician (born 1985)

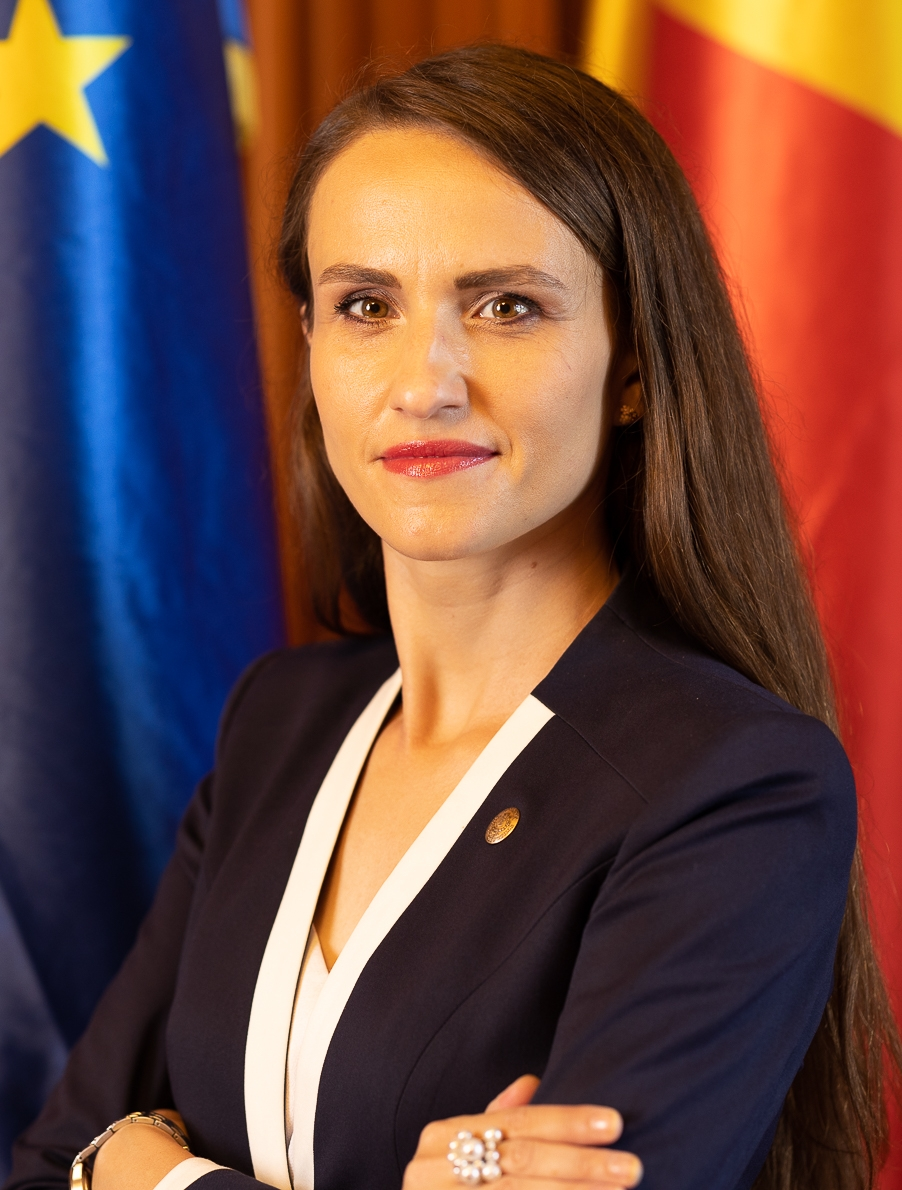
- Official portrait, April 2025

Minister of Foreign Affairs
- In office 23 June 2025 – 20 October 2026
- Prime Minister: Ilie Bolojan
- Preceded by: Emil Hurezeanu
- Succeeded by: Dan Neculăescu

Member of the Chamber of Deputies
- Incumbent
- Assumed office 21 December 2020
- Constituency: Bucharest

Personal details
- Born: Oana-Silvia Țoiu; 9 July 1985 (age 41) Călărași, Socialist Republic of Romania
- Party: USR (since 2021)
- Other political affiliations: PLUS (until 2021)
- Education: University of Bucharest
- Occupation: Journalist; politician

Oana-Silvia Țoiu (Romanian pronunciation: [ˈo̯ana ˈsilvi.a ˈtsoju]; born 9 July 1985) is a Romanian politician of the Save Romania Union. She served as Minister of Foreign Affairs in the Ilie Bolojan cabinet. Since 2020, she has also been a member of the Chamber of Deputies. In the first session, she was elected chair of the labour committee. In 2021, she was proposed as minister of labor in the rejected cabinet of Dacian Cioloș. In 2024, she was elected as one of the vice presidents of the chamber.

Born in Călărași in 1985, she completed secondary studies at the Constantin Carabella National College in Târgoviște in 2004 and then graduated from the Faculty of Journalism and Communication Studies of the University of Bucharest in 2009. Țoiu is Romania's third female Foreign Minister in Romania's post-democratic era and is the fourth Romanian female Foreign Minister after Ana Pauker, Ramona Mănescu and Luminița Odobescu.

From 2016 to 2017, she served as state secretary of the Ministry of Labor and Social Protection. In the 2019 European Parliament election, she was a candidate for member of the European Parliament.
