= Emil Hurezeanu =

Romanian writer and dissident (born 1955)

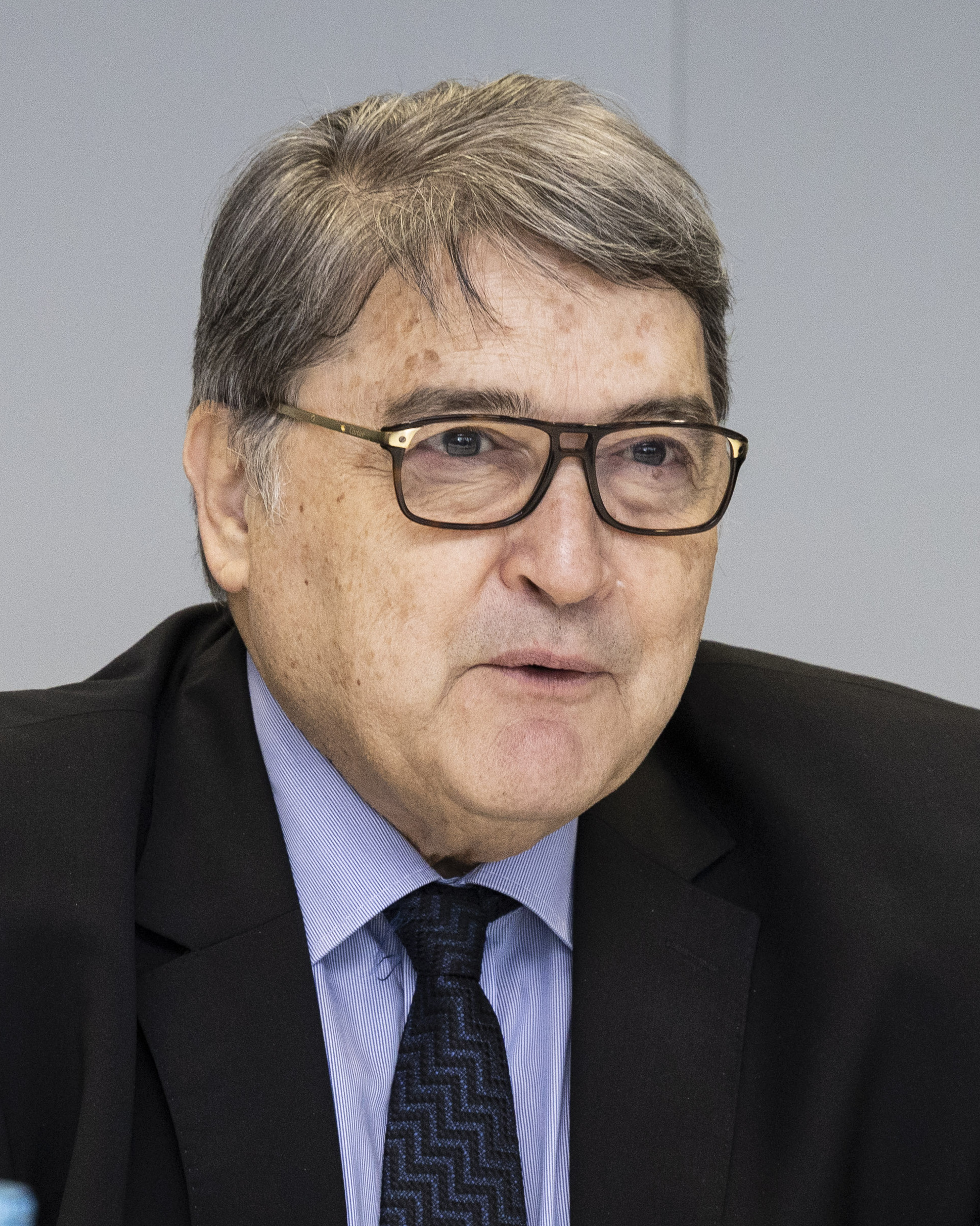
- Hurezeanu in 2025

Minister of Foreign Affairs
- In office 23 December 2024 – 23 June 2025
- Prime Minister: Marcel Ciolacu; Cătălin Predoiu (acting)
- Preceded by: Luminița Odobescu
- Succeeded by: Oana Țoiu

Ambassador of Romania to Austria
- In office 19 May 2021 – 2023

Ambassador of Romania to Germany
- In office 5 May 2015 – 19 May 2021

Personal details
- Born: August 26, 1955 (age 70) Sibiu, Socialist Republic of Romania
- Spouse: Rucsandra Hurezeanu
- Children: 3
- Education: Master of Arts
- Alma mater: Babeș-Bolyai University; University of Virginia; Boston University
- Occupation: Journalist

Emil Horațiu Hurezeanu (Romanian pronunciation: [eˈmil hureˈze̯anu]; born August 26, 1955) is a Romanian journalist, writer, politician and diplomat. He served as the Romanian Minister of Foreign Affairs from 2024 to 2025. He has previously served as Romania's ambassador in Germany and Austria.

== Education ==
Born in Sibiu, he graduated from the Law School of Babeș-Bolyai University in Cluj-Napoca (1975–1979). He then worked as jurist in Alba County (1980–1981), in Mediaș (1981–1982), and at the Eminescu Bookshop in Sibiu (1981). Between 1981 and 1982, he studied at Vienna and in October 1983, he obtained political asylum in West Germany.

== Journalist career ==
For more than a decade, Hurezeanu worked for the Romanian department of Radio Free Europe (1983–1994), in Munich. Also, after 1985, he studied political science at the University of Virginia and in 1990 he graduated from Boston University. He was the director of the Romanian department of Radio Free Europe for a few months in 1994. Then, he worked as director of the Romanian section of the Deutsche Welle from Cologne (1995–2002). Having returned to Romania for good in 2002, he was a personal adviser to Romanian Prime Minister Adrian Năstase (March–September 2003). In Romania, he worked for Antena 1, Radio Europa FM, România Liberă, and Realitatea TV. Hurezeanu was director of the Realitatea-Cațavencu trust in Romania between February 1, 2009, and October 2010.

In 2008, Emil Hurezeanu was among the 500 richest Romanians, with an estimated wealth of €6–7 million.

== Personal life ==
Emil (or Emilian) Hurezeanu's mother, Paraschiva, was a teacher and his father, Ion, was an engineer. Emil Hurezeanu has a brother, Mihai Hurezeanu. He is a distant relative of writer Ion Negoițescu (1921–1993).

In 2004, Hurezeanu married Rucsandra (born Șipoș in Târgu Mureș, 1974), a pharmacist by training. She studied the pharmaceutical marketing at Ecole Supérieure de Commerce de Paris and is the daughter of Mioara Șipoș, one of the most important businesswomen in Mureș County and Transylvania. They have two sons.

Also, Hurezeanu has an older child from a previous relationship, Joachim, who lives in France.

== Works ==
- Lecția de anatomie (1979)
- Între câine și lup (1996)
- Cutia Neagră (1997)
- Cetățile fortificate din Transilvania (2009). Editorial Artec.
- Pe trecerea timpului: Jurnal politic românesc, 1996–2015 (2015)
