= Mănescu =

Mănescu is a Romanian surname. Notable people with the surname include:

- Corneliu Mănescu (1916–2000), Romanian diplomat
- Manea Mănescu (1916–2009), Romanian politician
- Ramona Mănescu (born 1972), Romanian politician and lawyer
