= Romanian National Committee (1948) =

- Comitetul Național Român
- Founded: 1948
- Dissolved: 1972
- Purpose: Anti-communism
- Headquarters: Washington, D.C., United States
- Key people: Nicolae Rădescu
- Affiliations: Assembly of Captive European Nations

Romanian National Committee (Romanian: Comitetul Național Român, CNR) was an anti-communist organization of Romanian post-World War II exiles in the Western world. It claimed to represent a government in exile. Its aim was to defend Romanian democratic interests in the West at a time when the Communist Party was in power in Romania.

== History ==
The committee was established in Washington, D.C. by General Nicolae Rădescu, one of the Prime Ministers of Romania after the overthrow of dictator Ion Antonescu by King Michael I and the opposition parties. He was also the last Prime Minister of Romania not to be affiliated with the Communist Party.

Initially called the National Committee of Romanian Coordination (Comitetul Național de Coordonare Românească), the CNR was one of nine organizations that made up the Assembly of Captive European Nations. At the time when it was established, the committee consisted of ten members from three major pre-war Romanian parties, the National Peasants' Party, the Liberal Party and a faction of the Socialist Party that rejected its merger into the Romanian Workers' Party. Former King Michael I, who had abdicated in December 1947, supported the new organization.

The co-founders of the organization were Cornel Bianu (the envoy of Iuliu Maniu to London during World War II), Alexandru Cretzianu (former Romanian minister in Ankara and initiator of secret negotiations with the Allies in Cairo in 1944), Mihail Fărcășanu (president of the Romanian Liberal Youth Organization), Grigore Niculescu-Buzești (former Minister of Foreign Affairs), Augustin Popa (former member of the Parliament of Romania), Constantin Vișoianu (former Minister of Foreign Affairs, and participant of secret negotiations with the Allies in Cairo in 1944), Iancu Zissu (member of the Independent Socialist Party), Nicolae Caranfil (former Minister of Aviation) and Grigore Gafencu (former Minister of Foreign Affairs of Romania), the last two having served as ministers during the pre-war dictatorship of King Carol II. Historian Neagu Djuvara, himself an exilé at the time, mentions a slightly different composition, excluding Bianu and Buzești, but including the Peasants' Party's Emil Ghilezan, the Liberal Party's Vintilică Brătianu, and the trade unionist Eftimie Gherman. However, he acknowledges the important role of Niculescu-Buzești in the creation of the organization.

== Charter and members ==
The charter of the CNR stated that the purpose of the committee was to represent the Romanian nation and defend its national interests until the "national liberation"; take actions by any possible means to "liberate" Romania and to reestablish a democratic government in the country; coordinate and support the welfare of all Romanian refugees; manage cooperation of the Romanian diaspora to arrive at the fulfillment of their purposes. In light of conflicts over administration of controversial funds of the organization, four members of the committee (Rădescu, Gafencu, Fărcăşanu, and Caranfil) resigned in the summer of 1950. Djuvara also mentions the dispute around the inclusion in the committee of a former Romanian minister to Washington as a further cause of the split. Constantin Vișoianu became the new president, either by election or, as Djuvara suggests, appointment by the former king. New members included George Assan, Alexandru Bunescu, Dumitru Ciotori, Anton Crihan, Sabin Manuilă, and Mihai Răutu.

The committee members split the responsibilities and developed relations with the U.S. Department of State, the United Nations, foreign ambassadors, other Eastern European national committees; published and disseminated propaganda material about CNR, and worked with the media.

== Activities ==
The committee collected data and wrote reports for both U.S. and international officials on political, economic, and social relations of the Romanian People's Republic. Its reports were published in the newsletters Romania and La Nation Roumaine. One of the main purposes of the organization was lobbying for sanctions against the communist authorities’ abuse of human rights.

The committee gradually started losing its importance over the years, as its main sponsor, the National Committee for a Free Europe, which also funded the Assembly of Captive European Nations and Radio Free Europe/Radio Liberty, decreased its funding in the 1960s due to the new U.S. policy of building bridges with the Communist governments of the Eastern Bloc. In the beginning of the 1970s, it was revealed that the National Committee for a Free Europe was actually sponsored by the Central Intelligence Agency. Having lost its external financial support, the CNR had to dissolve in 1972.

== See also ==
- Romanian National Committee (1975), a continuation attempt of the Romanian National Committee created in 1948
