= Alliance for Romania =

Alliance for Romania Alianța pentru România
- Abbreviation: ApR
- President: Teodor Meleșcanu
- Founder: Teodor Meleșcanu
- Founded: 1997
- Dissolved: 2002
- Split from: Party of Social Democracy in Romania
- Merged into: National Liberal Party
- Ideology: Social democracy Social liberalism Third way
- Political position: 1997-2001: Center-left; 2001-2002: Center-right

Alliance for Romania (Romanian: Alianța pentru România, ApR) was a political party in Romania active during the late 1990s and early 2000s which was headed by Teodor Meleșcanu, former Democratic National Salvation Front (FDSN) Minister of Foreign Affairs between 1992 and 1996. It was a splinter faction of the Party of Social Democracy in Romania (PDSR; later on PSD) which subsequently got absorbed by the National Liberal Party (PNL) in 2002.

== History ==
The party was founded in 1997, having a centrist ideology marked by social democracy, social liberalism, and third way politics (at least theoretically, on paper). From 1997 up until 2001, it conserved this ideology. However, between 2001 and 2002 it switched, at least theoretically (on paper), to a centre-right ideology, before eventually being absorbed by the National Liberal Party (PNL). Given its relatively short political existence, the party had only contested the 2000 local elections and 2000 general elections, both with modest electoral results, further polarising the confused and divided electorate of the Romanian right and centre-right.
