= Constantin Vișoianu =

Romanian jurist, diplomat, and politician

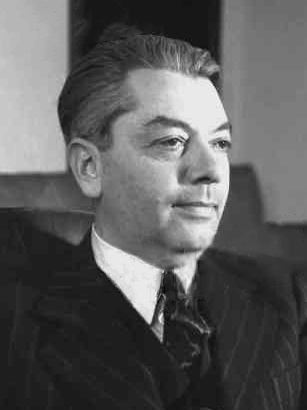
- Vișoianu in 1945

Minister of Foreign Affairs of Romania
- In office 4 November 1944 – 5 December 1944
- Prime Minister: Constantin Sănătescu
- Preceded by: Grigore Niculescu-Buzești
- In office 6 December 1944 – 28 February 1945
- Prime Minister: Nicolae Rădescu
- Succeeded by: Gheorghe Tătărescu

Romania Ambassador to the Netherlands
- In office 1 July 1933 – 1 October 1935
- Monarch: Carol II

Romania Ambassador to Poland
- In office 1 October 1935 – 25 October 1936
- Monarch: Carol II

Personal details
- Born: 4 February 1897 Urlați, Prahova County, Kingdom of Romania
- Died: 3 January 1994 (aged 96) Chevy Chase, Maryland, United States
- Education: University of Bucharest; University of Paris
- Profession: Lawyer, diplomat
- Known for: President of the Romanian National Committee

Constantin Vișoianu (4 February 1897 – 3 January 1994) was a Romanian jurist, diplomat, and politician, who served as Minister of Foreign Affairs at the end of World War II. He later emigrated to the United States, where he served as President of the Romanian National Committee.

== Biography ==
=== Early years ===
Born in Urlați, Prahova County, he studied at the University of Bucharest and got a doctor's degree in Law at the Sorbonne in Paris. Upon returning to Romania, Vișoianu practiced as a lawyer at the Olt County Bar (starting in 1926), then at the Bucharest Bar (from 1937).

Vișoianu was technical advisor at the League of Nations. From 1931 to 1933 he was member of the Romanian permanent delegation to the Conference on Disarmament. He was thereafter appointed minister plenipotentiary to The Hague (1 July 1933 – 1 October 1935) and Warsaw (1 October 1935 – 25 October 1936).

=== World War II ===
During World War II, Vișoianu was an unofficial advisor to the opposition to the dictatorial regime of Ion Antonescu. In April 1944 he went on a secret mission to Cairo, where he helped negotiate the terms of Romania's armistice with the Allies and its subsequent participation in the war against Nazi Germany. On 25 May 1944, he presented an amended proposal for armistice terms, drawn by a committee consisting of Ghiță Popp and Ioan Hudiță (PNȚ), Bebe Brătianu and C. Zamfirescu (PNL), Ștefan Voitec and Iosif Jumanca (PSD), Petre Constantinescu-Iași and Vasile Bâgu (PCR). The Romanians hoped to conclude terms only with the Anglo-Americans, and were reluctant to meet with the Soviets directly, whereas the Allies insisted on Russian priority. As recounted by Vișoianu in a 1990 interview, the proposal was turned down by the Allies on June 1.

After the Romanian coup d'état of 23 August 1944, when King Michael I of Romania removed the government of Antonescu and Romania switched sides from the Axis to the Allies, Vișoianu was named Minister of Foreign Affairs of Romania, at the recommendation of Iuliu Maniu. He served in that capacity from 4 November 1944 to 28 February 1945 in the Sănătescu and Rădescu governments. At the beginning of 1945, Vișoianu transferred to his associate Alexandru Cretzianu 6 million Swiss francs from an account previously constituted in Switzerland by the Antonescu government. He was smuggled out of Romania in 1946 by United States agents when the Romanian Communist Party rose to power; he reportedly left on a plane, together with Grigore Niculescu-Buzești. At the November 1947 trial of National Peasants' Party leading figures such as Maniu and Ion Mihalache, Vișoianu was sentenced in absentia by the Military Tribunal of the Second Region of Bucharest to 15 years of forced labor.

=== In the United States ===
Using the funds he and Cretzianu had appropriated in 1945, the two managed to wrest political control over the Romanian exiles from former prime-minister Nicolae Rădescu. According to a report later written by Vișoianu, half the funds were collected by Cretzianu, and the rest were deposited in a secret fund with the Bank of Switzerland. Of this money, a small part was used to support the work of a group of Romanians at the Paris Peace Conference, and another part was used to support, for a while, the activities of Romanian exiles in the United States.

In 1950 Vișoianu was appointed by former King Michael I to be the president of the Romanian National Committee, which had been founded in 1948 in New York to express opposition to Communist rule in Romania. In that role (which he held until the committee was dissolved in 1975), Vișoianu would send messages to the Romanians in the country, read on the BBC World Service, Voice of America, and Radio Free Europe. He also held meetings with U.S. officials, such as John Foster Dulles, Dean Acheson, and John C. Campbell, and wrote memoirs to the U.S. Presidents Richard Nixon and Gerald Ford and the President of France, Charles de Gaulle, in which he called on senior Western officials to intervene for the respect of human rights and freedoms by the Communist government in Bucharest.

In 1994 he died of cancer at his home in Chevy Chase, Maryland, at age 96.

== Writings ==
- Vișoianu, Constantin (1926), "Cronica Externă. (Pactul Franco-Romîn.—Pactul Italo-Romîn)" [Foreign Column. (The Franco-Romanian Pact.—The Italo-Romanian Pact)], Viața Românească (in Romanian), vol. 18, no. 10, pp. 103–110
- Vișoianu, Constantin (1927), "Diplomație fascistă sau jocurile de noroc" [Fascist diplomacy or gambling], Viața Românească (in Romanian), vol. 19, no. 8–9, pp. 189–195
- Vișoianu, Constantin (1997). Misiunile mele: culegere de documente [My missions: collected documents]. Adrian Severin, George G. Potra, Nicolae Dinu, C. I. Turcu, Ion Calafeteanu, Nicolae C. Nicolescu. București: Editura Enciclopedia. ISBN 973-45-0225-5. OCLC 39812335.
