= Lazăr Comănescu =

Romanian diplomat and politician

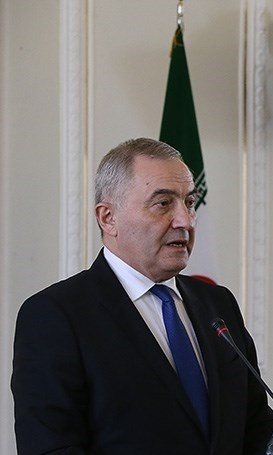
- Comănescu in 2016

Minister of Foreign Affairs
- In office 17 November 2015 – 4 January 2017
- Prime Minister: Dacian Cioloș
- Preceded by: Bogdan Aurescu
- Succeeded by: Teodor Meleșcanu
- In office 15 April 2008 – 22 December 2008
- Prime Minister: Călin Popescu-Tăriceanu
- Preceded by: Adrian Cioroianu
- Succeeded by: Cristian Diaconescu

Personal details
- Born: 4 June 1949 (age 77) Horezu, Romania
- Party: Independent
- Education: Bucharest Academy of Economic Studies; Paris-Sorbonne University

Lazăr Comănescu (Romanian pronunciation: [ˈlazər koməˈnesku]; born 6 June 1949) is a Romanian diplomat who served as Foreign minister of Romania from 2015 to 2017 and in 2008 as part of the National Liberal Party of Romania.

== Biography ==
Lazăr Comănescu was born on 4 June 1949, in Horezu, Romania. After studying international trade at the Bucharest Academy of Economic Sciences (1972), he earned a master's degree in Contemporary French Civilization and Language from the Sorbonne University (1973) and a doctorate in International Economic Relations from the Bucharest Academy of Economic Sciences (1982).

Between 1972 and 1982, he worked in the International Economic Organizations Department of the Romanian Ministry of Foreign Affairs. After receiving his doctorate, he became a lecturer in the International Economic Relations Department of the Bucharest Academy of Economic Sciences (1982–1990).

After the Revolutions of 1989, Lázar Comănescu returned to the Ministry of Foreign Affairs, where he served first as an advisor, then (after 1993) as Minister-Counsellor of the Mission of Romania to the European Union in Brussels (1990–1994), Director of the Ministry's Directorate for the European Union (1994–1995), and finally as Director General, Advisor to the Minister, and Chief of Staff (1995).

From 1995 to 1998, Lázar Comănescu was appointed State Secretary at the Ministry of Foreign Affairs. During the same period, he worked as an associate professor at the Academy of Economic Sciences. Between 1998 and 2008, he served as Romania's Ambassador to the European Union (in Brussels).

He served as Romanian Ambassador to Germany from 2009 to 2015.

He has been serving as Secretary General of the Organization of the Black Sea Economic Cooperation since 1 July 2021.

== See also ==
- List of foreign ministers in 2017

== Notes ==
Political offices
Preceded by Adrian Cioroianu	Minister of Foreign Affairs; 2008	Succeeded by Cristian Diaconescu
Preceded by Bogdan Aurescu	Minister of Foreign Affairs; 2015–2017	Succeeded by Teodor Meleșcanu
