= Grigore Niculescu-Buzești =

Romanian politician

Minister of Foreign Affairs of Romania
- In office August 23, 1944 – November 3, 1944
- Prime Minister: Constantin Sănătescu
- Preceded by: Mihai Antonescu
- Succeeded by: Constantin Vișoianu

Personal details
- Born: August 1, 1908 Sărata, Buzău County, Kingdom of Romania
- Died: October 4, 1949 (aged 41) New York City, United States
- Party: National Peasants' Party

Grigore Niculescu-Buzești (August 1, 1908 – October 4, 1949) was a Romanian politician who served as the Minister of Foreign Affairs of Romania.

Niculescu-Buzești was one of the founding members of Romanian National Committee (Romanian: Comitetul Național Român), an organization which claimed to be a Romanian government in exile. He was also one of the participants in the plot against the Romanian Nazi-collaborating dictator Ion Antonescu organized by King Michael I. Niculescu-Buzești died on October 12, 1949, in New York City.

== See also ==
- Foreign relations of Romania
