= Teodor Meleșcanu =

Romanian politician

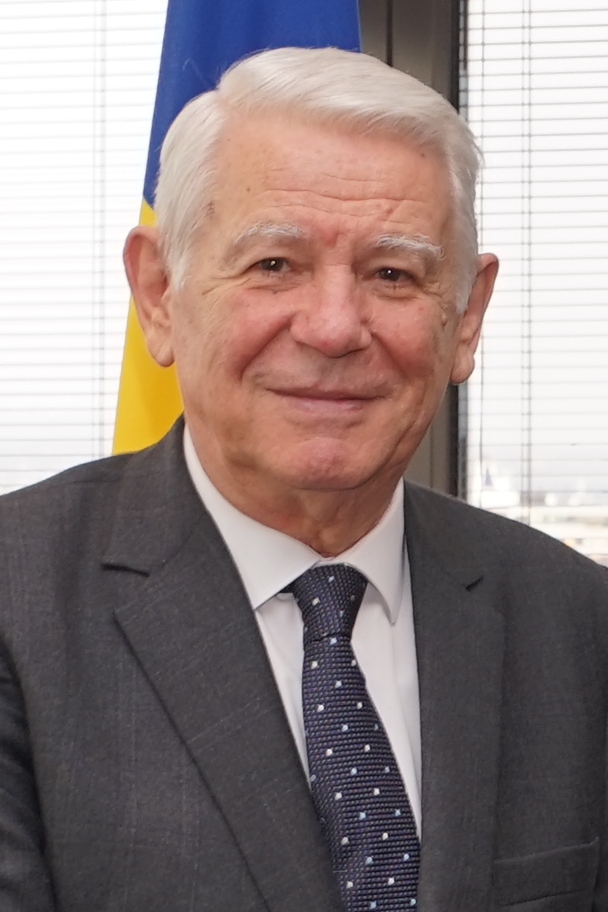
- Meleșcanu in 2017

President of the Senate of Romania
- In office 10 September 2019 – 3 February 2020
- Preceded by: Călin Popescu-Tăriceanu
- Succeeded by: Titus Corlățean (Acting)

Minister of Foreign Affairs
- In office 4 January 2017 – 15 July 2019
- Prime Minister: Sorin Grindeanu; Mihai Tudose; Mihai Fifor (Acting); Viorica Dăncilă
- Preceded by: Lazăr Comănescu
- Succeeded by: Ramona Mănescu
- In office 10 November 2014 – 24 November 2014
- Prime Minister: Victor Ponta
- Preceded by: Titus Corlățean
- Succeeded by: Bogdan Aurescu
- In office 19 November 1992 – 11 December 1996
- Prime Minister: Nicolae Văcăroiu
- Preceded by: Adrian Năstase
- Succeeded by: Adrian Severin

Director of the Foreign Intelligence Service
- In office 28 February 2012 – 22 September 2014
- Preceded by: Mihai Răzvan Ungureanu
- Succeeded by: Silviu Predoiu (Acting)

Minister of Justice Acting
- In office 15 January 2008 – 29 February 2008
- Prime Minister: Călin Popescu-Tăriceanu
- Preceded by: Tudor Chiuariu
- Succeeded by: Cătălin Predoiu

Minister of Defence
- In office 5 April 2007 – 22 December 2008
- Prime Minister: Călin Popescu-Tăriceanu
- Preceded by: Sorin Frunzăverde
- Succeeded by: Mihai Stănișoară

Personal details
- Born: Teodor Viorel Meleșcanu; 10 March 1941 (age 85) Brad, Hunedoara County, Kingdom of Romania
- Party: Party of Social Democracy in Romania (Before 1997); Alliance for Romania (1997–2001); National Liberal Party (2001–2012); Independent (2012–2016); Alliance of Liberals and Democrats (2016–2019); Independent (2019–2020); Social Liberal Humanist Party (2020–present)
- Spouse: Felicia Meleșcanu
- Children: 1 daughter
- Education: University of Bucharest; University of Geneva; Graduate Institute of International and Development Studies

Teodor Viorel Meleșcanu (Note: Romanian pronunciation: [teˈodor meleʃˈkanu]) (born 10 March 1941) is a Romanian politician, diplomat, and jurist. He served as Director of the Foreign Intelligence Service of Romania (SIE) between 2012 and 2014. He was a three times senator on behalf of the National Liberal Party (PNL), Minister of Defense between 2007 and 2008, and Minister of Foreign Affairs between 1992 and 1996, in November 2014 and from January 2017 to July 2019. On 27 February 2012, upon his appointment as head of the SIE, he suspended himself from PNL and was later expelled from the party. On 10 September 2019, he was elected President of the Senate. He resigned from office on 3 February 2020.

== Life and career ==
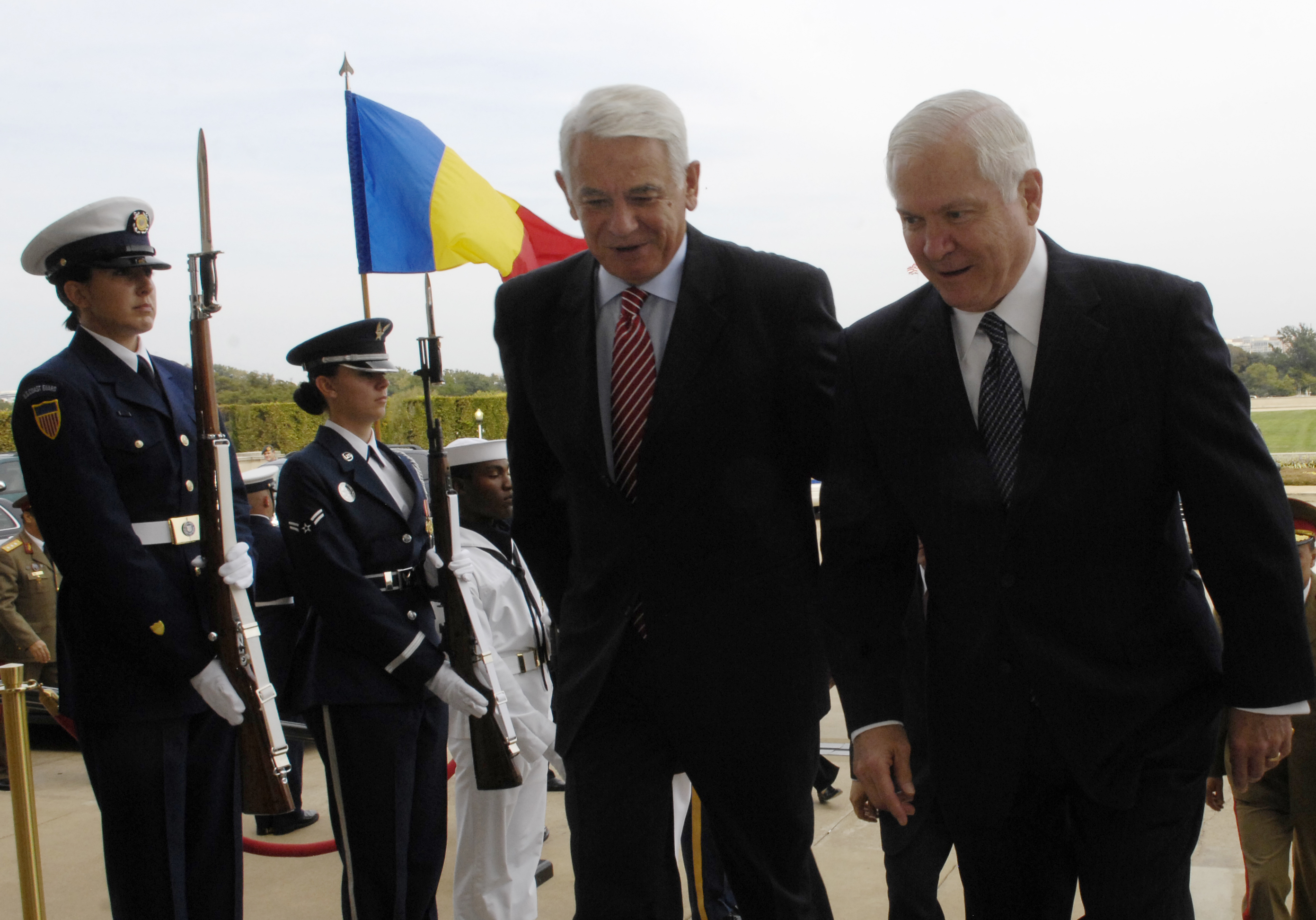
Robert Gates, the United States Defense Secretary (right) escorts Teodor Meleșcanu through an honor cordon into the Pentagon, to talk about bilateral defense issues (September 24, 2008)

Born in Brad, Hunedoara County, he was baptized in the town's Romanian Orthodox church. Around the age of five, he left for Buteni, his grandparents' village, located near the Crișul Alb River. Meleșcanu then studied at Moise Nicoară National College in Arad. He graduated from the Faculty of Law of the University of Bucharest in 1964 and the Faculty of Economic and Social Sciences of the University of Geneva in 1968. In 1973, he obtained a doctorate in political science and international law from the University of Geneva and the Graduate Institute of International Studies.

Between 1966 and 1990 he held various diplomatic functions in the Ministry of Foreign Affairs. In August 1990 he was named undersecretary of state in this ministry. Between November 1992 and November 1996 he was the Minister of Foreign Affairs in Nicolae Văcăroiu's Party of Social Democracy (PDSR) government. In 1996 he campaigned as an independent for election to the Senate from the Prahova County electoral district. He was elected to that body, becoming president of the Foreign Affairs Committee of the Senate of Romania in the 1996–2000 legislature.

In 1997, Meleșcanu founded the Alliance for Romania (Alianța pentru România) party, together with several former members of the PDSR (Mircea Coșea, Iosif Boda, and others). He was elected president of this party in December 1997 and re-elected in March 2001. In January 2002, in the wake of the Alliance for Romania's merger with the PNL, Meleșcanu became first vice-president of the latter party. Since 2004, he has been a Liberal senator for Prahova, also being a vice-president in the Permanent Bureau of the Senate.

He is a professor at the Faculty of Political Sciences of the University of Bucharest, and has written a substantial number of works and scientific publications dealing with international law and diplomacy. On February 27, President Traian Băsescu appointed him for the SIE position vacant after the former director Mihai Răzvan Ungureanu's ascension to the post of Prime Minister.

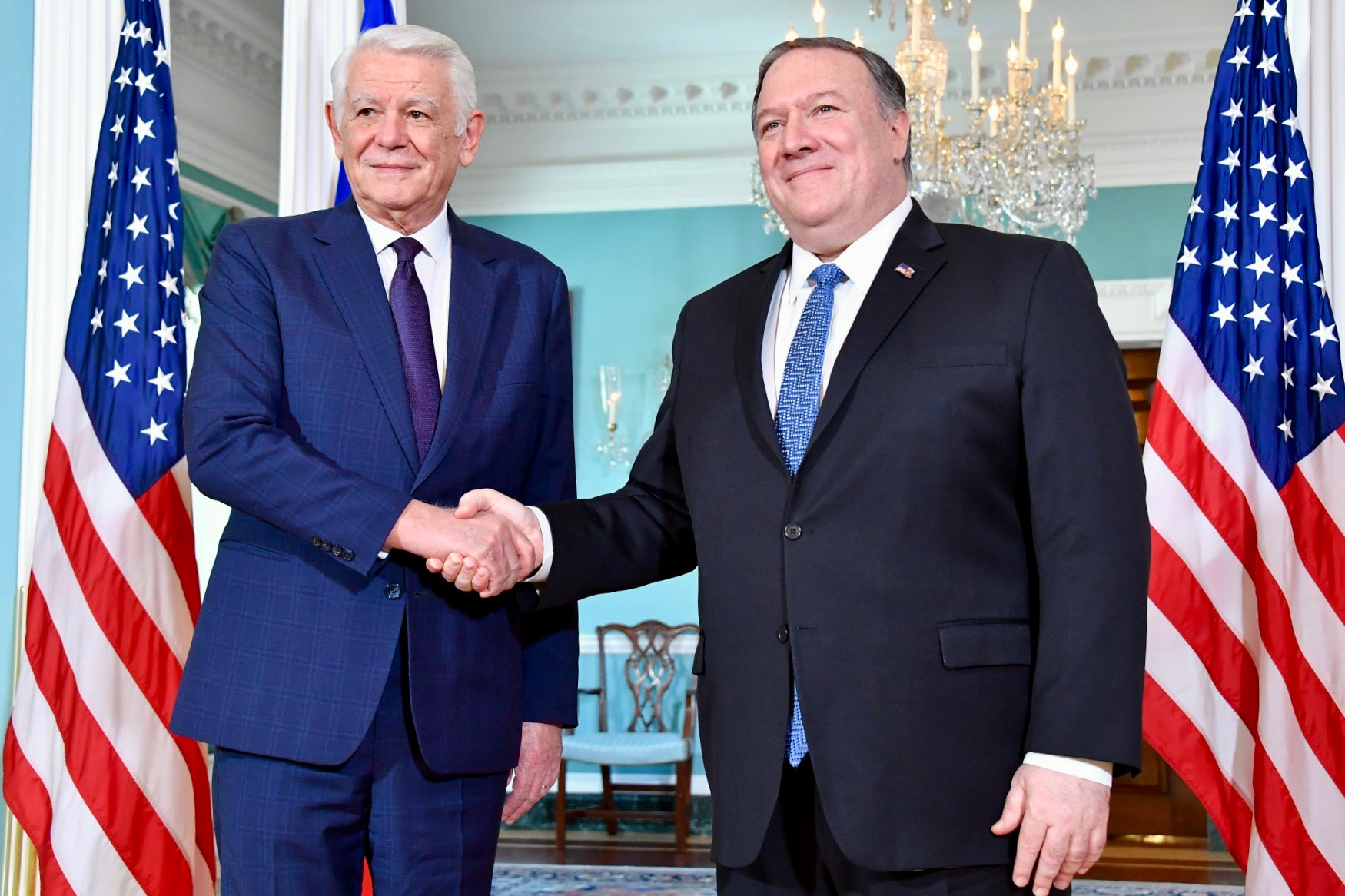
Meleșcanu meets with U.S. Secretary of State Michael R. Pompeo at the U.S. Department of State in Washington, D.C., on April 1, 2019.

In 2013 he was awarded Commander's Cross with Star of the Order of Merit of the Republic of Poland.

In November 2014, following the resignation of Titus Corlățean as a result of problems with voting in the Romanian diaspora during the first round of that year's presidential election, Meleșcanu was appointed foreign minister. He resigned eight days later, after similar problems took place during the second round. After his resignation, he joined the advisory board of the Fourth Ponta Cabinet regarding security and defense affairs. After Ponta was replaced by Dacian Cioloș, he was dismissed and joined ALDE. In January 2018 he became again Foreign Minister of Romania, this time in Dăncilă Cabinet.

After thousands of Romanians living abroad have experienced difficulties in expressing their vote in the 2019 European Parliament election, Meleșcanu has been accused of premeditated abuse and obstruction of their right to vote. On 6 June 2019, The National Anticorruption Directorate (Romanian: Direcţia Naţională Anticorupţie (DNA)) announced that it has launched a criminal investigation in the matter.

== Scientific activity ==
Apart from his diplomatic and political activity, Teodor Melescanu also did a didactic activity. He teaches as a professor at the Faculty of Political Sciences of the University of Bucharest, the Department of International Relations, being a holder of the courses "Public International Law", "European Security" and "The Principles and Practice of Diplomacy". He also teaches the "International Negotiation Theory and Practice" course at the Masters of the Faculty of Political Sciences of the University of Bucharest and the course "Public International Law" at the Masters Courses of the Faculty of History of the University of Bucharest.

Meleşcanu published a wide range of scientific papers and publications related to international law and diplomacy. He is the vice-president of the Association of International Law and International Relations (ADIRI) in Bucharest, a member of the Institute for Political Studies in Bucharest and of the Romanian Institute of International Studies (IRSI).

Minister Melescanu is a Member of the Advisory Board of the Global Panel Foundation (Berlin, Copenhagen, New York, Prague, Sydney, Toronto) - a prominent NGO which works behind the scenes in conflict areas around the world.

== Personal life ==
Meleșcanu was married to Felicia Meleșcanu, a jurist and Romanian Television (TVR) journalist, until her death in January 2004.

== Electoral history ==
=== Presidential elections ===
Election	Affiliation	First round			Second round		
Election	Affiliation	Votes	Percentage	Position	Votes	Percentage	Position
2000	Alliance for Romania (ApR)	241,642	1.90%	7th			
2014	Independent	104,131	1.09%	9th			

== See also ==
- List of current foreign ministers
- List of foreign ministers in 1996
- List of foreign ministers in 2014
- List of foreign ministers in 2017

== Notes ==
Political offices
Preceded by Adrian Năstase	Minister of Foreign Affairs; 1992–1996	Succeeded by Adrian Severin
Preceded by Sorin Frunzăverde	Minister of Defence; 2007–2008	Succeeded by Mihai Stănișoară
Preceded by Tudor Chiuariu	Minister of Justice; Acting; 2008	Succeeded by Cătălin Predoiu
Preceded by Titus Corlățean	Minister of Foreign Affairs; 2014	Succeeded by Bogdan Aurescu
Preceded by Lazăr Comănescu	Minister of Foreign Affairs; 2017–2019	Succeeded by Ramona Mănescu
Preceded by Călin Popescu-Tăriceanu	President of the Senate of Romania; 2019–2020	Vacant Title next held by Anca Dragu
Government offices
Preceded by Mihai Răzvan Ungureanu	Director of the Foreign Intelligence Service; 2012–2014	Succeeded by Silviu Predoiu; Acting
