= Bogdan Aurescu =

Romanian jurist

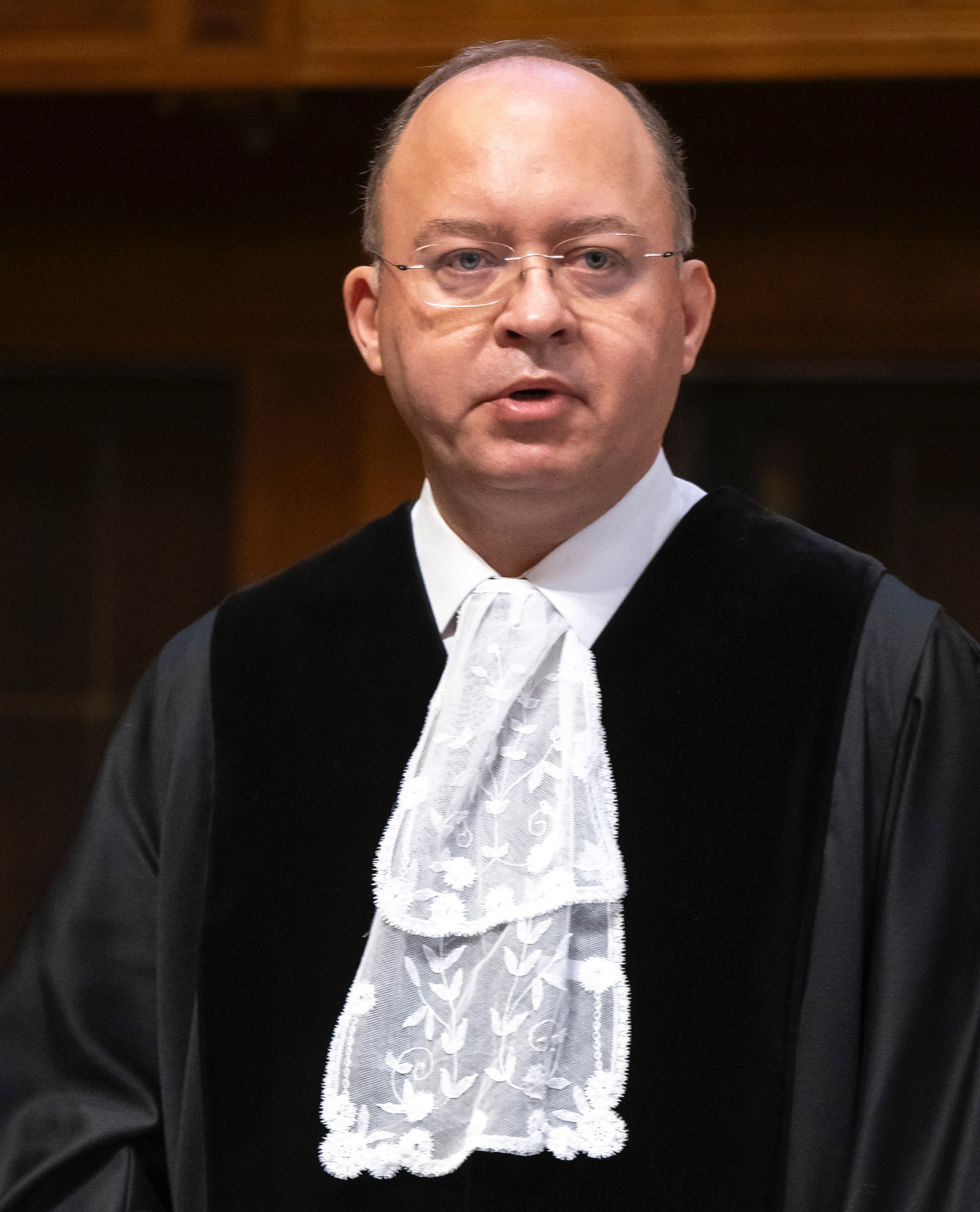
- Aurescu in 2024

Judge of the International Court of Justice
- Incumbent
- Assumed office February 6, 2024
- Preceded by: Kirill Gevorgian

Minister of Foreign Affairs
- In office 4 November 2019 – 15 June 2023
- Prime Minister: Ludovic Orban; Florin Cîțu; Nicolae Ciucă
- Preceded by: Ramona Mănescu
- Succeeded by: Luminița Odobescu
- In office 24 November 2014 – 17 November 2015
- Prime Minister: Victor Ponta; Gabriel Oprea (Acting); Victor Ponta; Sorin Cîmpeanu (Acting)
- Preceded by: Teodor Meleșcanu
- Succeeded by: Lazăr Comănescu

Personal details
- Born: 9 September 1973 (age 53) Bucharest, Romania
- Party: Independent
- Education: University of Bucharest; Carol I National Defence University

Bogdan Lucian Aurescu (Note: Romanian pronunciation: [boɡˈdan lut͡ʃiˈan a.uˈresku]) (born 9 September 1973) is a Romanian judge of the International Court of Justice. Prior to his swearing-in on 6 February 2024, Aurescu was a diplomat, law professor and politician, who served as Minister of Foreign Affairs of Romania between 4 November 2019 and 15 June 2023 under prime ministers: Ludovic Orban, Florin Cîțu and Nicolae Ciucă. He also held that position between 24 November 2014 and 17 November 2015 under prime minister Victor Ponta.

He also held the position of Foreign Policy Advisor to the President of Romania from May 2016 to November 2019 and Secretary of State in the Romanian Ministry of Foreign Affairs: Secretary of State for Strategic Affairs (2009–2010, 2012–2014), Secretary of State for European Affairs (2004–2005, 2010–2012) and Secretary of State for Global Affairs (2012).

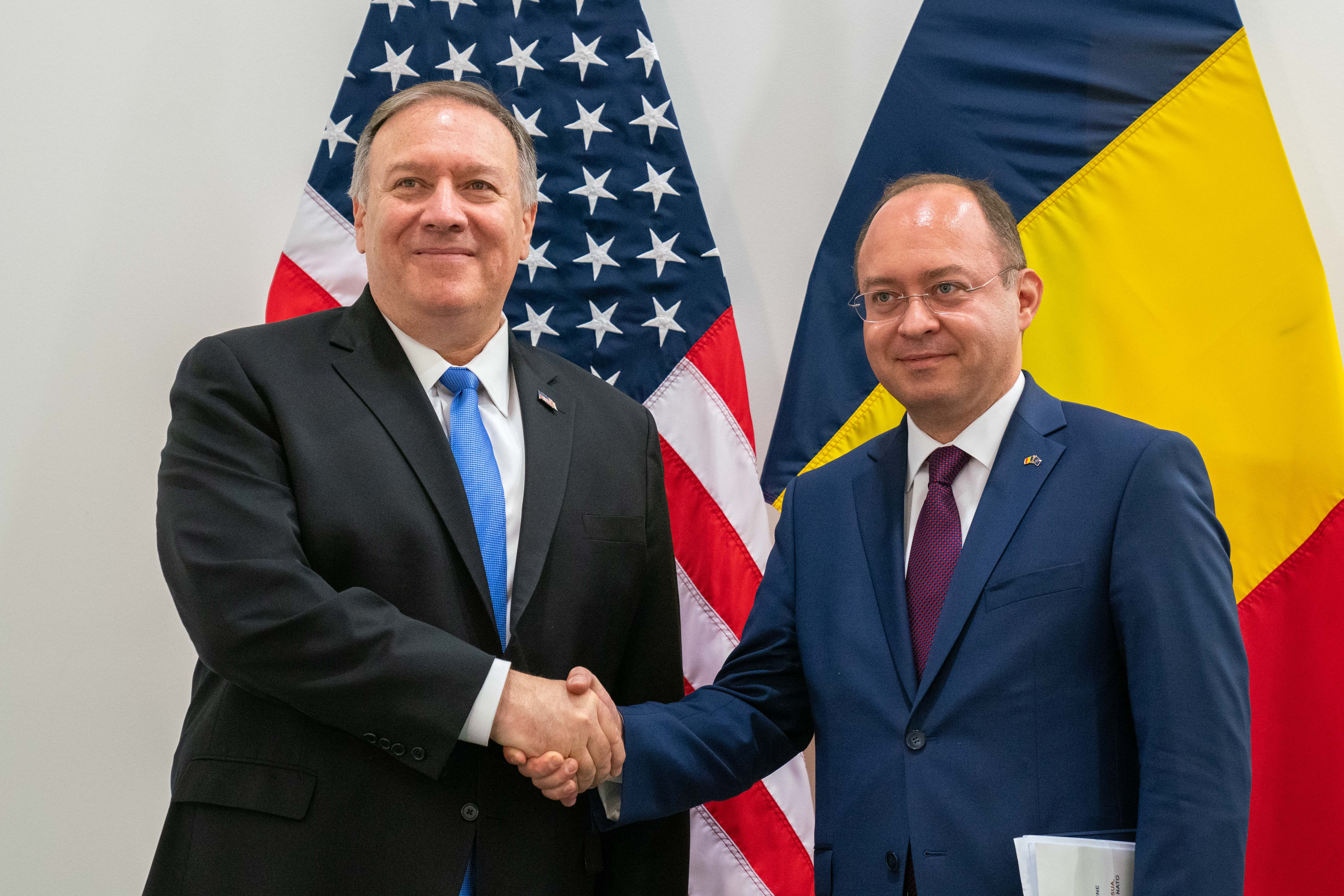
Aurescu meets with U.S. Secretary of State Mike Pompeo in Brussels on November 20, 2019.

Between 2004 and 2009, Aurescu was his country's chief counsel in the Maritime Delimitation in the Black Sea case, a boundary dispute with Ukraine that Romania brought before the International Court of Justice.

Between 2010 and 2011, he was the head of the Romanian delegation for the negotiations on the Romanian-American Ballistic Missile Defense Agreement, and of the Joint Declaration on the Strategic Partnership for the 21st Century between Romania and USA.

In November 2016, he was elected by the United Nations General Assembly as a member of the UN International Law Commission for a five years mandate (2017–2021).

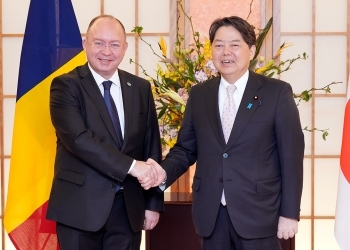
Aurescu with Japanese Foreign Minister Yoshimasa Hayashi in Tokyo, 7 March 2023

On 9 November 2023, at the 2023 International Court of Justice judges election, Aurescu was elected as the Eastern European representative at the International Court of Justice (ICJ). He received the votes of 117 UN General Assembly members, beating Russia's representative Kirill Gevorgian, who received the votes of 77. This marked the first time that Russia would not be represented at the Court.

He is also a Professor of Public International Law at the Faculty of Law, University of Bucharest, having started his teaching activity in 1998.

== Controversies ==
Adrian Năstase promoted Bogdan Aurescu to the post of Undersecretary of State and later, to the Secretary of State. Aurescu was Năstase's assistant at the Faculty of Law of the University of Bucharest for the Public International Law discipline and they wrote together several legal treaties. In 2004, Aurescu ran for a seat in the Romanian Parliament on behalf of the Social Democratic Party (PSD) in Dâmbovița County, but he did not win.

In November 2014, Adrian Năstase attended an event called by the Ministry of Foreign Affairs and Minister Bogdan Aurescu. Recently released from prison, where he was imprisoned being sentenced twice for the corruption offenses, Năstase was next to Aurescu, who had just been appointed Foreign Minister, at a book launch event. In April 2015, former Prime Minister and Foreign Minister Adrian Năstase, who was twice sentenced for prison, returned to the Government, more precisely to the Ministry of Foreign Affairs, at the invitation of the acting minister Bogdan Aurescu to the meeting of an advisory council. The ministry led by Aurescu then argued that the invitation was made "because of his rich institutional and professional expertise".

In June 2015, Prime Minister Victor Ponta was charged by the National Anticorruption Directorate for several corruption offenses. At that time, Bogdan Aurescu was a member of the Ponta Government and remained in office until November 2015, when Victor Ponta resigned.

== Notes ==
Political offices
Preceded by Teodor Meleșcanu	Minister of Foreign Affairs; 2014–2015	Succeeded by Lazăr Comănescu
Preceded by Ramona Mănescu	Minister of Foreign Affairs; 2019–2023	Succeeded by Luminița Odobescu
