= Titus Corlățean =

Romanian politician and diplomat (born 1968)

Titus Corlățean Ph.D., KSR
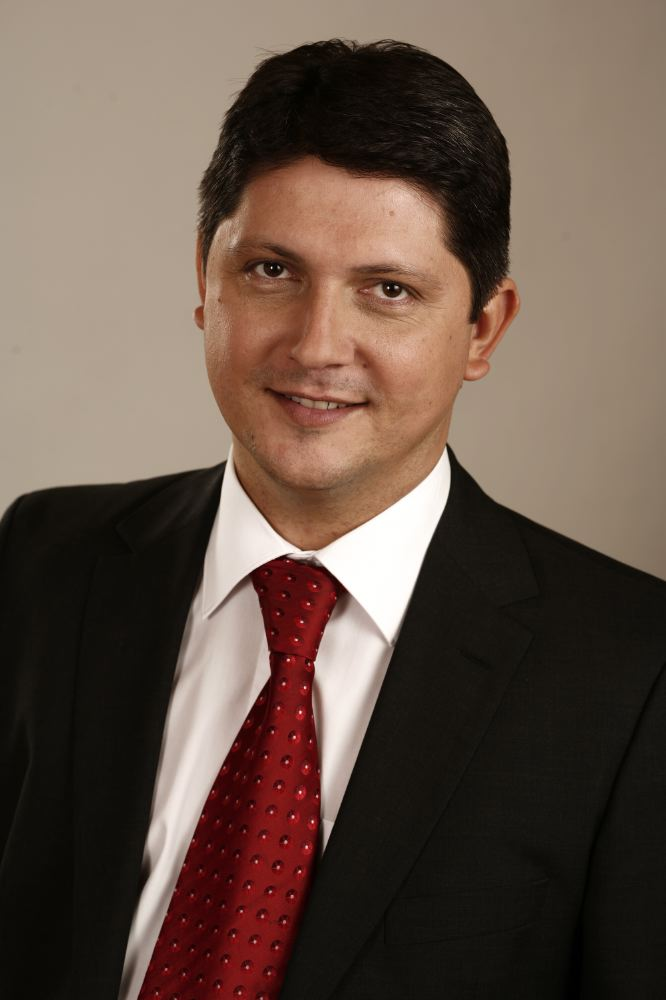
- Official portrait, 2024

President of the Senate of Romania
- Acting
- In office 3 February 2020 – 9 April 2020
- Preceded by: Teodor Meleșcanu
- Succeeded by: Robert Cazanciuc (Acting)

Minister of Foreign Affairs
- In office 6 August 2012 – 10 November 2014
- Prime Minister: Victor Ponta
- Preceded by: Andrei Marga
- Succeeded by: Teodor Meleșcanu

Minister of Justice
- In office 7 May 2012 – 6 August 2012
- Prime Minister: Victor Ponta
- Preceded by: Cătălin Predoiu
- Succeeded by: Victor Ponta (Acting)

Member of the European Parliament for Romania
- In office 1 January 2007 – 18 December 2008

Member of the Senate of Romania
- Incumbent
- Assumed office 15 December 2008
- Constituency: Dâmbovița (2016–present); Bucharest (2012–2016); Brașov (2008–2012)

Member of the Chamber of Deputies
- In office 13 December 2004 – 20 December 2007
- Constituency: Brașov County

Personal details
- Born: 11 January 1968 (age 58) Medgidia, Constanța County, Romania
- Party: Social Democratic Party
- Education: University of Bucharest (PhD); École nationale d'administration
- Occupation: Diplomat, politician
- Profession: Jurist

Titus Corlățean KSR (Romanian pronunciation: [ˈtitus korləˈt͡se̯an]; born 11 January 1968) is a Romanian politician and diplomat, former Minister of Justice and of Foreign Affairs. He is a member of the Social Democratic Party (PSD), part of the Party of European Socialists, and was elected to the Chamber of Deputies for Brașov County in the 2004 elections.

== Early life and education ==
Corlățean was born in Medgidia, and graduated from the University of Bucharest's Faculty of Law in 1994. He also earned a certificate from the International Institute of the École nationale d'administration in Paris (1995).

== Diplomatic career ==
Between 1994 and 2001, Corlățean worked as a diplomat in the Ministry of Foreign Affairs, before joining Prime Minister Adrian Năstase's Chancellery in 2001–2003 (first as Adviser on Foreign Policy Issues, and, after 2003, as Secretary of State for the Romanian Diaspora).

== Political career ==
Corlățean has been a member of the PSD since 2002, serving as spokesperson for its Coordinating Committee after 2004.

Corlățean became an appointed Member of the European Parliament on 1 January 2007, with the accession of Romania to the European Union. He was elected to that body late in the same year. During his tenure, he served on the Committee on Legal Affairs, including as vice-chair. He resigned in 2008 after being returned to the Chamber. In 2012, he was elected Senator for Bucharest.

In Prime Minister Victor Ponta's cabinet, Corlățean served as Justice Minister (May–August 2012) and as Foreign Minister (August 2012—November 2014). He resigned from the latter position following the first round of the 2014 presidential election, in which he was blamed for not setting up enough polling places for the Romanian diaspora.

In addition to his role in parliament, Corlățean has served as member of the Romanian delegation to the Parliamentary Assembly of the Council of Europe from 2009 until 2012 and since 2015. As member of the PSD, he is part of the Socialists, Democrats and Greens Group. In the Assembly, he has served on the Committee on Political Affairs and Democracy; the Committee on the Election of Judges to the European Court of Human Rights; the Committee on Legal Affairs and Human Rights; the Committee on the Honouring of Obligations and Commitments by Member States of the Council of Europe (Monitoring Committee); the Sub-Committee on the implementation of judgments of the European Court of Human Rights; and the Sub-Committee on the Middle East and the Arab World. He has been the Assembly's co-rapporteur on Georgia since 2018 (alongside Kerstin Lundgren and later Claude Kern) and on the downing of Malaysia Airlines Flight 17 since 2021. In 2019, he became the Assembly's General Rapporteur on the abolition of the death penalty.

In 2026, Corlățean introduced a Senate resolution criticizing Swedish social services in the case of two Romanian minors and called for their return to Romania. He has described aspects of the Swedish child protection system in strongly negative terms.

== Recognition ==
In 2004, Corlățean was appointed Knight of the Order of the Star of Romania; in 2014, he was appointed Grand Cross of the Order pro merito Melitensi.

== Personal life ==
Corlățean is married and the father of one daughter.

== Notes ==
Political offices
Preceded by Cătălin Predoiu	Minister of Justice; 2012	Succeeded by Victor Ponta; Acting
Preceded by Andrei Marga	Minister of Foreign Affairs; 2012–2014	Succeeded by Teodor Meleșcanu
Preceded by Teodor Meleșcanu	President of the Senate of Romania; Acting; 2020	Succeeded by Robert Cazanciuc; Acting
