= Dan Neculăescu =

Romanian diplomat

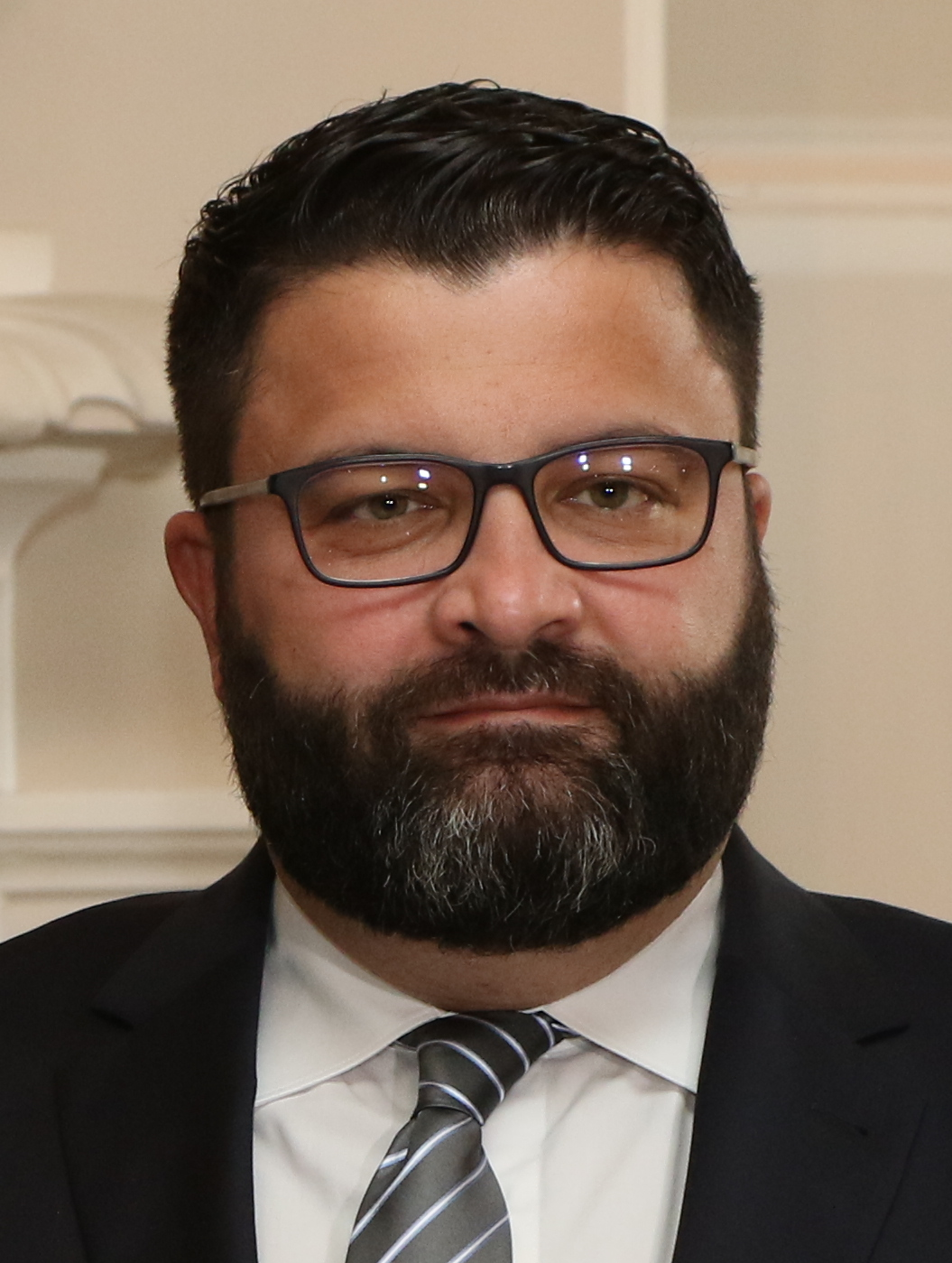
Dan Neculăescu

Dănuț Sebastian Neculăescu is a Romanian career diplomat who has been serving as Minister of Foreign Affairs of Romania since 20 October 2026. He has previously served as the Permanent Representative of Romania to NATO from February 2022 until October 2026.

== Education ==
Neculăescu attended University of Bucharest for his first degree and Nicolae Titulescu University of Bucharest where he studied law. He attended courses at the Diplomatic Academy of the Romanian Ministry of Foreign Affairs in 2002 before attending NATO College, Rome in 2003.

== Career ==
Neculăescu started his diplomatic career in 2002 as an Advisor to the Minister's Cabinet before being appointed as Third Secretary and later promoted to Second Secretary of the Analysis and Policy Planning Directorate and NATO Directorate in the Ministry of Foreign Affairs where he served until 2004. From 2004 to 2006, he was Head of Office and later Director of OSCE, Nonproliferation and Arms Control Directorate of the Ministry of Foreign Affairs.

Neculăescu served as Deputy Permanent Representative of Romania to the political-military dialogue in Vienna from 2006 to 2009 and served as Deputy Permanent Representative of Romania to the International Atomic Energy Agency (IAEA) in Vienna, and the Preparatory Commission of the Comprehensive Test Ban Nuclear Treaty (CTBTO) from 2009 to 2011. Neculăescu served as state counselor for foreign affairs in the office of Romanian prime minister. In February 2022, he was appointed Permanent Representative of Romania to NATO.
