= Adrian Severin =

Romanian politician

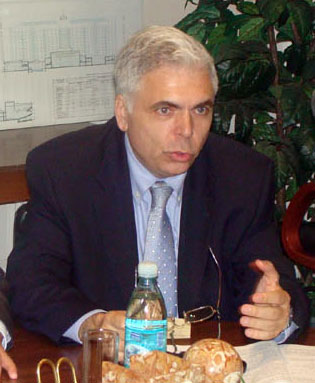
- Severin in 2008

Minister of Foreign Affairs
- In office 12 December 1996 – 29 December 1997
- President: Emil Constantinescu
- Preceded by: Teodor Meleșcanu
- Succeeded by: Andrei Pleșu

Personal details
- Born: 28 March 1954 (age 72) Bucharest, Romania
- Party: National Salvation Front; Democratic Party; Social Democratic Party

Adrian Severin (born 28 March 1954) is a Romanian politician and former Member of the European Parliament.

Adrian Severin started his political career under the Communist rule, as Instructor (lector) at Ștefan Gheorghiu Academy, the university for Romanian Communist cadres. After the regime change, he became a member of the National Salvation Front and the Democratic Party (which he left in April 1999). Severin was the Minister of Foreign Affairs of Romania between 12 December 1996 and 29 December 1997 as part of the Victor Ciorbea cabinet. He sat in the Chamber of Deputies in June–July 1990 before resigning, and again was a member of that body from 1992 until December 2007, when he resigned.

He is a member of the Social Democratic Party, part of the Group of the Party of European Socialists, and became an MEP on 1 January 2007 with the accession of Romania to the European Union. Previously, Severin served as the UN Special Rapporteur on Human rights in Belarus from 2005 to 2006. He was member of PACE from 1993 till 1997 and from 2003 till 2007.

In 2011, the European Parliament opened a formal investigation into alleged corruption by Severin and two other MEPs, based on an investigation conducted by journalists of the Sunday Times weekly (part of The Times of London). The Romanian politician insisted he had done nothing that was "illegal or against any normal behavior". Severin was accused of accepting bribe in exchange for initiating some law amendment, and was recorded on video by the journalists when requesting and accepting the bribe. Subsequently, he was called by the Leader of the SD Group in the European Parliament to resign. As he refused, he was suspended from his position as Deputy-Leader of the SD Group and had to leave this Parliamentary Group.

He was indicted by Romania's anti-corruption agency in September 2013 and in February 2016, a court sentenced him to three and a half years in prison, although he could still appeal the judgement. Eventually he served 15 months in jail.

Although he was sentenced to three and a half years imprisonment for corruption, Severin ran at the 2016 local elections for the office of Mayor of Bucharest on a Social Justice Party (whose chairman is Marian Vanghelie) ticket. He received 8,234 votes (1.43%).

Adrian Severin is not the nephew of Ana Pauker, the world's first female foreign minister.

== See also ==
- List of corruption scandals in Romania
