= Luminița Odobescu =

Romanian diplomat

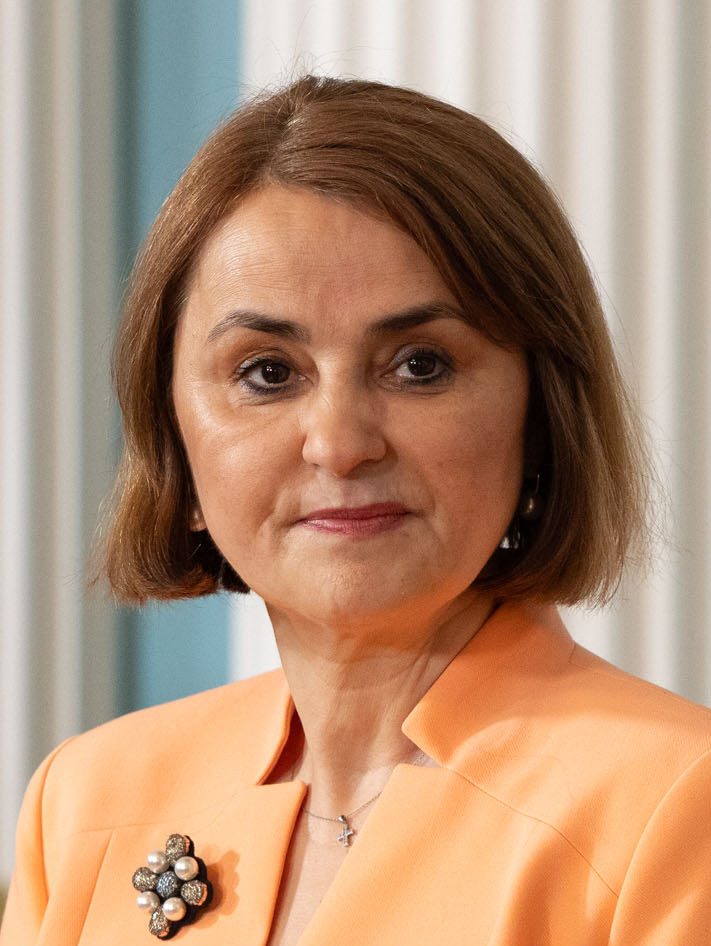
- Odobescu in 2024

Presidential Advisor
- Incumbent
- Assumed office February 13, 2025
- President: Ilie Bolojan (interim)

State Advisor for Foreign Policy and Security – Prime Minister's Chancellery
- In office January 2025 – February 2025
- Prime Minister: Marcel Ciolacu

Minister of Foreign Affairs
- In office June 15, 2023 – December 20, 2024
- Prime Minister: Marcel Ciolacu
- Preceded by: Bogdan Aurescu

Presidential Advisor - Department of European Affairs
- In office November 2021 – June 15, 2023
- President: Klaus Iohannis

Permanent Representative of Romania to the European Union
- In office August 2015 – November 2021

State Advisor for European Affairs and Foreign Policy – Prime Minister's Chancellery
- In office November 2012 – August 2015

State Secretary for European Affairs – Ministry of Foreign Affairs
- In office February 2012 – November 2012

Director General European Union / Minister Counselor, MFA
- In office June 2008 – February 2012

Advisor, EU Policies Directorate, MFA
- In office December 2007 – June 2008

Advisor, General Directorate for Trade Policies - Ministry of Small and Medium Enterprises, Commerce, Tourism, and Liberal Professions
- In office August 2007 – December 2007

Advisor/Mertens at the Permanent Representation of Romania to the EU, Brussels
- In office September 2002 – August 2007

Personal details
- Born: 3 May 1969 (age 56) Reghin, Socialist Republic of Romania
- Spouse: Șerban Odobescu
- Children: 2
- Awards: National Order of Merit (2007); Legion of Honour (2015); Order of the Star of Romania (2019); Grand Cross of Merit with Star (2023)

Luminița-Teodora Odobescu (born 3 May 1969) is a Romanian career diplomat. She serves as Presidential Adviser for the interim President of Romania, starting 13 February 2025. Between January and February 2025, she held the position of State Adviser for Foreign Policy and Security within the Chancellery of the Prime Minister.

From June 2023 to December 2024, Odobescu served as Romania’s Minister of Foreign Affairs. An ambassador and career diplomat, she previously held the position of Presidential Advisor for European Affairs, also coordinating the Foreign Policy Department (November 31, 2021 – June 15, 2023).

She was Romania’s Permanent Representative to the European Union from 2015 to 2021 and led the Permanent Representation during Romania’s first Presidency of the Council of the European Union (January–June 2019).

== Education and early career ==
Odobescu graduated from the Faculty of Commerce at the Bucharest Academy of Economic Studies in 1992. After graduating she became a researcher at the Virgil Madgearu National Institute until 1995. From 1995 to 1999, she held various positions in the European Union division of the Department for Foreign Trade. From 1999 to 2002 she was head of unit at the same department, where she was responsible for the management of trade relations between European communities and Romania in the framework of the European Union Association Agreement.

Odobescu obtained a PhD in International Economic Relations from the Academy of Economic Studies in Bucharest in 2003.

== Career (2002–2023) ==
Odobescu held various positions in the Permanent Representation of Romania to the EU, where she was responsible for negotiating the energy, economic and monetary union, taxation, trade of Romania's accession to the EU. She was also in charge of trade relations and trade defence measures between Romania and the EU. From June 2008 to February 2012 she served as director general of the European Union Department within the Ministry of Foreign Affairs where she coordinated the EU affairs and political dialogue between EU Member states, the acceding states to the EU and EFTA countries. From February to November 2012 she served as State Secretary on European Affairs in the Ministry of Foreign Affairs.

Odobescu was state counsellor and advisor on European Affairs and External Relations to the Romanian prime minister from 8 November 2012 to 1 August 2015. She was the permanent representative of Romania to the EU from September 2015 to November 2021, where she managed the first Romanian Presidency of the Council of the EU in 2019. She was presidential advisor for European Affairs from November 2021 to June 2023.

== Foreign Affairs Minister (2023–2024) ==
=== 2023 ===
==== June–July ====
Odobescu was appointed Minister of Foreign Affairs in the Ciolacu Cabinet on 15 June 2023. Odobescu is Romania's second female Foreign Minister in Romania's post-democratic era and is the third Romanian female Foreign Minister after Ana Pauker and Ramona Mănescu.

Odobescu's first foreign trip was to Chișinău in the Republic of Moldova on 20 June, at the invitation of Deputy Prime Minister and Foreign Affairs Minister Nicu Popescu, where she reiterated Romania's support for Moldova's accession to the EU.

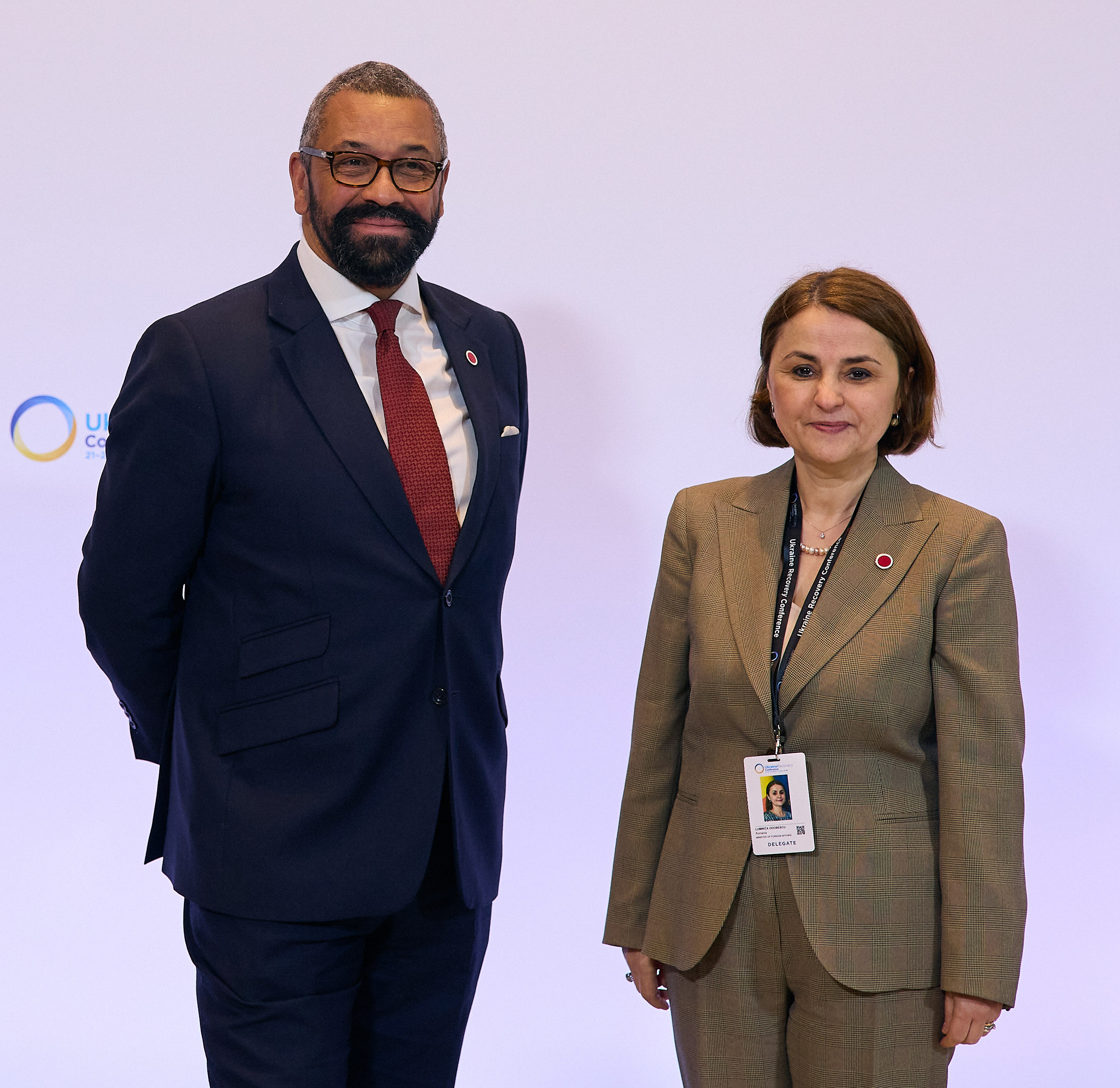
Odobescu with British Foreign Secretary, James Cleverly, at the Ukraine Recovery Conference on 21 June 2023

Soon after, Odobescu attended the Ukraine Recovery Conference in London and met with her Ukrainian counterpart, Dmytro Kuleba, for the first time. At the conference, Odobescu condemned the Russian invasion of Ukraine and highlighted a link between the reconstruction of Ukraine with the accession of Ukraine to the EU. During her meeting with Kuleba, she reaffirmed Romania's support for Ukraine due to Russian aggression and for Ukraine's European integration.

Odobescu attended the 2023 NATO Vilnius summit on 11 July. The same day, she held her first meeting since taking office with Spanish Foreign Affairs Minister, José Manuel Albares, with Odobescu stressing that the two countries remain fully committed to strengthening the strategic bilateral association. She also had her first bilateral meeting with UK Foreign Secretary James Cleverly since she took office, and they discussed the opportunities of strategic partnership, the ways of enhancing cooperation within NATO, and building a stronger alliance together. On 12 July, she again met Foreign Affairs Minister Popescu and also with Ambassador Viorel Cibotaru to discuss the dialogue between Moldova and NATO and the development of the defensive capabilities of Moldova. Odobescu also spoke alongside UK Defence Secretary Ben Wallace, Dutch Defence Minister Kajsa Ollongren and Swedish Foreign Affairs Minister Tobias Billström at the NATO Public Forum about NATO's strategic concept in practice.

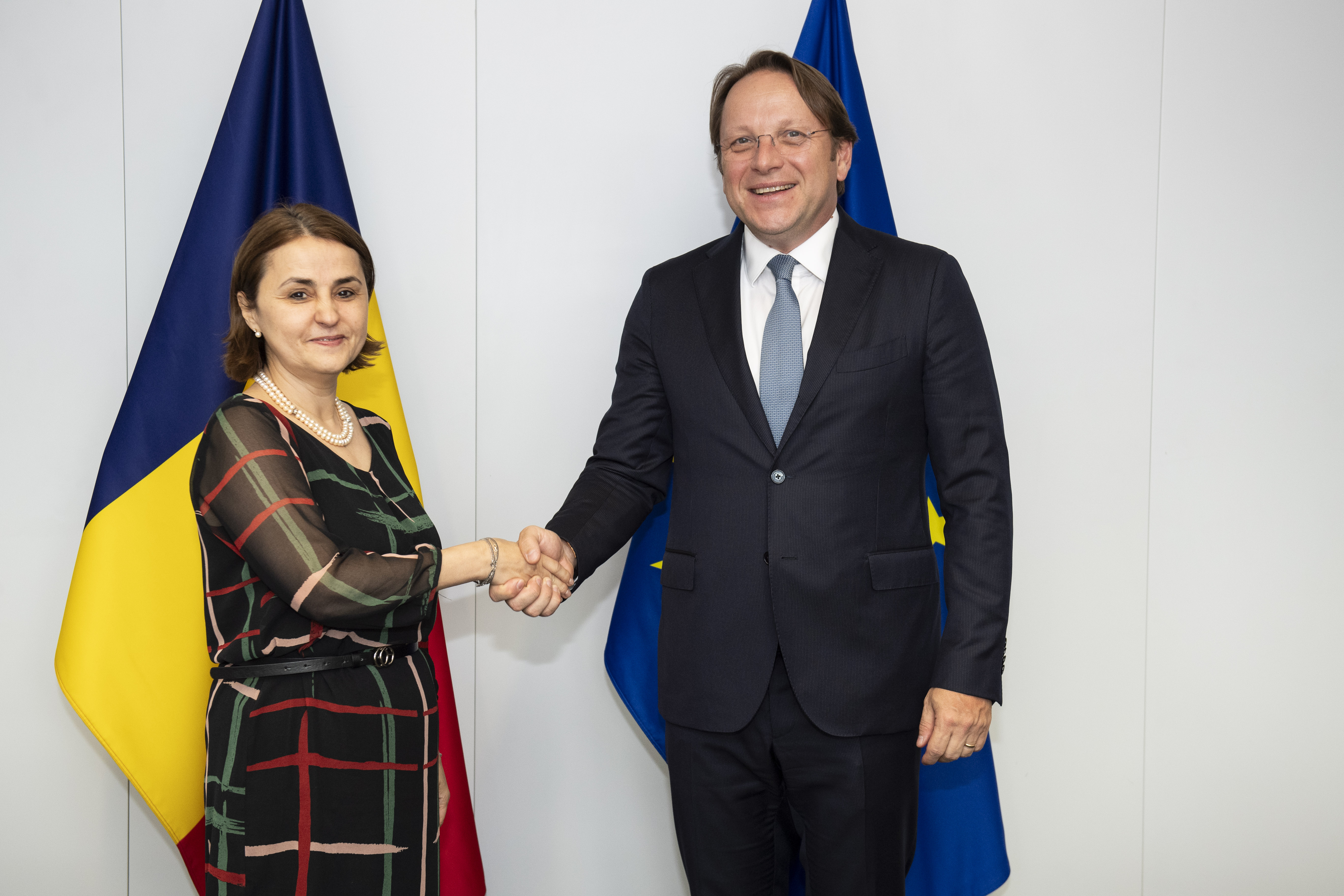
Odobescu with Olivér Várhelyi in Brussels on 19 July 2023.

On 19 July, ahead of attending the Foreign Affairs Council (FAC) in Brussels as part of the delegation led by President Klaus Iohannis, Odobescu held a bilateral meeting with European Commissioner for Neighbourhood and Enlargement, Olivér Várhelyi, where they discussed the opening of EU accession negotiations for Moldova and for Ukraine. They had previously been counterparts when both were permanent representatives of their respective countries to the EU. On 20 July, Odobescu attended the FAC where she held bilateral meetings with the Danish Foreign Affairs Minister Lars Løkke Rasmussen, the Belgian Foreign Affairs Minister Hadja Lahbib and with the Vice-President of the European Commission, Josep Borrell.

On 24 July, following a Russian strike on a Ukrainian port on the Danube near Romania, Odobescu spoke to the United States Secretary of State, Antony Blinken, and discussed several issues including the strategic partnership between Romania and the US, the opportunities for bilateral and multilateral cooperation, and support for Ukraine and Moldova. She informed Blinken of Romania's decision to join the G7 declaration on security guarantees for Ukraine. The following day, she spoke to her Kenyan counterpart, Alfred Mutua, about the development of Romanian-Kenyan cooperation and also about the insecurity of exports through the Black Sea.

==== August–September ====
On 16 August, Odobescu condemned further Russian attacks on Ukrainian ports on the Danube, describing them as "flagrant violations" of international law and stating the attacks continue to "jeopardise" global food security and "the safety of navigation in the Black Sea."

On 17 August, she spoke to Armenian Foreign Affairs Minister, Ararat Mirzoyan, and they discussed the security developments in the South Caucasus region, with Odobescu welcoming the mediation efforts of Charles Michel. The same day, Odobescu spoke to Canadian Foreign Affairs Minister, Mélanie Joly, and discussed various bilateral interests along with the joint effort of both countries to support Ukraine in the Russia-Ukraine War, and both Moldova and Ukraine in their European paths.

On 29 August, at the annual meeting of Romanian Diplomacy (RADR 2023), Odobescu met with her counterparts in Lithuania and in Chile. Odobescu met with Lithuanian Foreign Affairs Minister Gabrielius Landsbergis and they discussed the Russia-Ukraine War, focusing on ways to deter and sanction Russia and how to hold Russia accountable internationally. She also met with Chilean Foreign Affairs Minister Alberto van Klaveren, with van Klaveren stating his agreement with the principles of Romania regarding the respect for international law and treaties among other issues.

On 4 September, Odobescu embarked on an official visit to Germany where she held a joint press conference with German Foreign Affairs Minister, Annalena Baerbock, where both ministers underlined their commitment to strengthening European solidarity and unit. She had meetings with Baerbock and other officials with a focus on strengthening economic collaboration.

On 9 September, Odobescu responded to Austria blocking Romania's admission to the Schengen area, due to the possibility of Romania allowing illegal migration, in an interview with the Die Welt. Odobescu rejected this accusation, stating that it was "undeserved" and that Romania was "not a source or route for illegal migration", and also that it was "difficult to understand and explain" why Austria was opposed. In the same interview, she criticised Russian attacks near the Romanian border as "irresponsible" and that they have a "considerable potential for escalation."

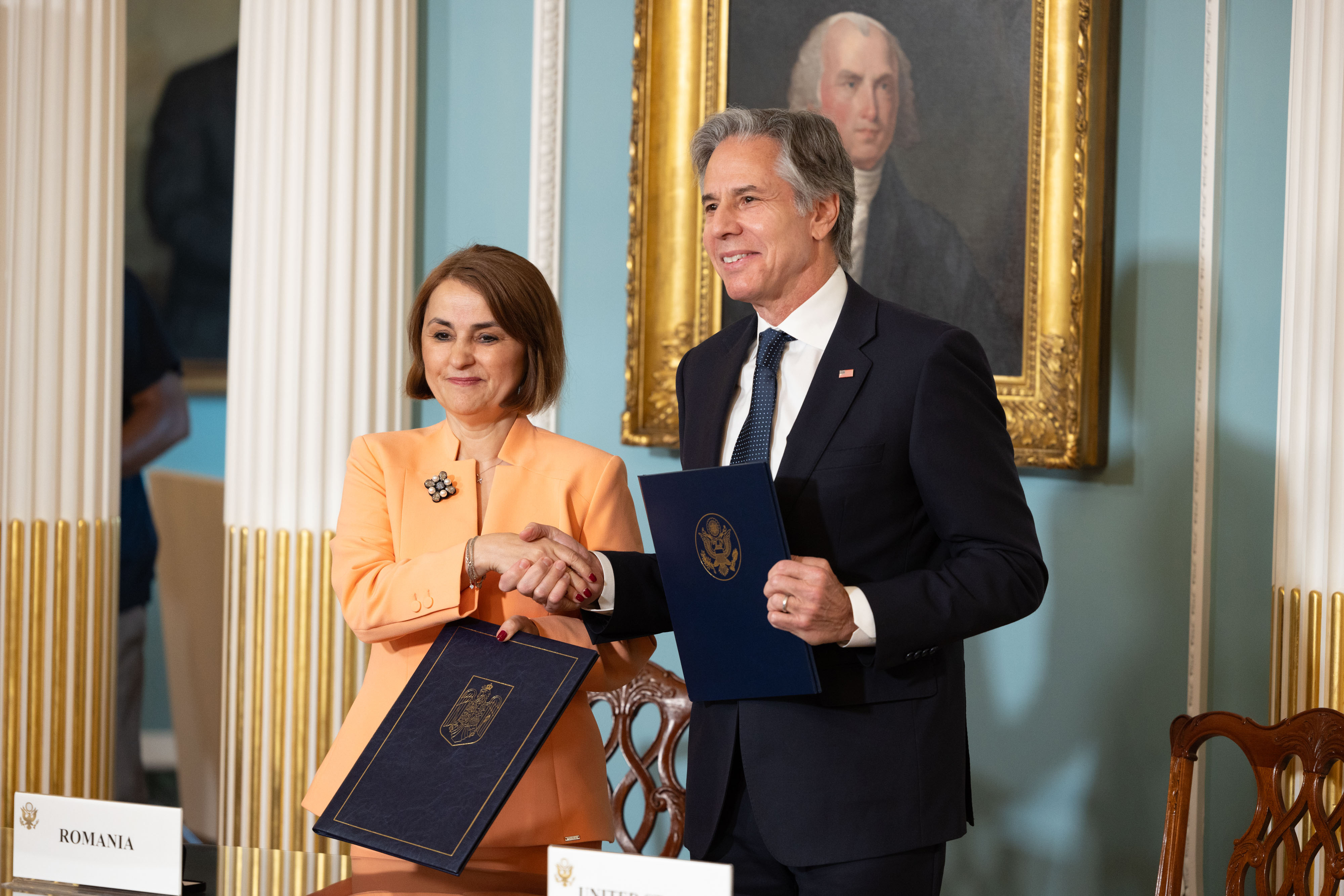
Odobescu signs a memorandum of understanding on countering foreign state information manipulation with United States Secretary of State Antony Blinken at the US State Department in 2024

Odobescu travelled to New York as part of the delegation led by President Iohannis for the 78th UN General Assembly. On 18 September, she held a series of bilateral meetings with various officials. Odobescu met with Sri Lankan External Affairs Minister, Ali Sabry, and they reviewed the state of political dialogue and discussed the importance of deepening bilateral relations in areas of mutual interest. United Arab Emirates Minister of Climate Change and Environment, Mariam Almheiri, and Odobescu exchanged views on areas of mutual interest including climate change and climate change initiatives. Georgian Foreign Affairs Minister, Ilia Darchiashvili, and Odobescu discussed issues of common interest along with ways to deepen the strategic partnership between the two countries. Odobescu also had a meeting with Nepal's Foreign Affairs Minister, Narayan Prakash Saud, where they underlined their interest in intensifying political dialogue. Odobescu also met with the President of the 78th UN General Assembly, Dennis Francis, where they exchanged views on the main global issues and challenges on the UN agenda, and Odobescu held discussions with Derek Chollet focused on security developments in the Black Sea and around the Romanian border due to the Russian-Ukraine War. On 19 September, she held further meetings with numerous officials during the UN General Assembly. She met with Europe and Foreign Affairs Minister of Albania, Igli Hasani, as it was the 110th anniversary of the establishment of diplomatic relations between the two countries, and they focused on the political and diplomatic actions in the coming period. During her meeting with Senegalese Foreign Minister, Aïssata Tall Sall, Odobescu expressed Romania's to strengthen relations. Odobescu met with Foreign Affairs, Communities and Defence Minister of Cape Verde, Rui Alberto de Figueiredo Soares, and communicated Romania's openness to relaunching bilateral cooperation between Romania and Cape Verde. Odobescu also met with the Foreign Affairs Minister of Saudi Arabia, Prince Faisal bin Farhan Al Saud, and she reaffirmed Romania's interest in strengthening the political dialogue. On 21 September, together with Secretary Blinken, hosted the Ministerial Meeting of the Global Network of National Focal Points for Women, Peace and security.

==== October–December ====
On 2 October, Odobescu travelled to Kyiv in Ukraine to participate in the informal FAC, where she affirmed Romania's support for Ukraine's accession to the EU and confirmed that Romania would continue to assist Ukraine with military aid and grain transit. She was awarded the Order of Prince Yaroslav the Wise by President Volodomyr Zelenskyy while there. Odobescu also met with Deputy Prime Minister for European and Euro-Atlantic Integration, Olha Stefanishyna, and they exchanged views on bilateral dialogue between Romania and Ukraine.

On 17 October, Odobescu travelled to Israel along with Prime Minister Ciolacu to express solidarity following the Gaza war and met with Foreign Affairs Minister Eli Cohen.

On 14 November, Odobescu embarked on a 3-day tour to the Western Balkans, firstly travelling to Tirana in Albania. She met with Europe and Foreign Affairs Minister Hasani again and signed the Action Plan 2024-2025 for cooperation between the two Foreign Affairs ministries. The following day she travelled to Skopje in North Macedonia where she met with President Stevo Pendarovski, Foreign Affairs Minister Bujar Osmani and Assembly President Talat Xhaferi. Her final trip on 17 November was to Montenegro where she met with President Jakov Milatović, Prime Minister Milojko Spajić, Foreign Affairs Minister Filip Ivanović, Deputy Prime Minister Aleksa Bečić and European Affairs Minister Maida Gorčević.

== Political views ==
=== Russian government ===
In an interview with Le Grand Continent on 15 July 2023, when asked about the future of Putin regime, she stated that the Moscow regime must be held to account for what it has done and the crimes that have been committed.

== Personal life ==
She was born on May 3, 1969, in Reghin, Mureș County. She is married and has two children.

== Honours ==
- 2007 – the Diplomatic Merit Order as an officer for her contribution to Romania's accession to the European Union
- December 2014 – the diplomatic rank of ambassador.
- 2015 – the national Order of the Legion of Honour of France, in the rank of Chevalier.
- November 2019 – the Order of the Star of Romania in the rank of Knight for the success of the Romanian Presidency of the Council of the European Union in the first semester.
- 2023 – the Grand Cross of Merit with Star.
- 2 October 2023 – Order of Prince Yaroslav the Wise
- December 2024 - the National Order of the Star of Romania in the rank of Officer for her activity in promoting Romania’s interests.
- January 2025 - the Order of Honour of the Republic of Moldova for her activity in supporting the Strategic Partnership between Romania and Moldova as well the European path of Republic of Moldova.
