= Ministry of Foreign Affairs (Romania) =

Government ministry of Romania

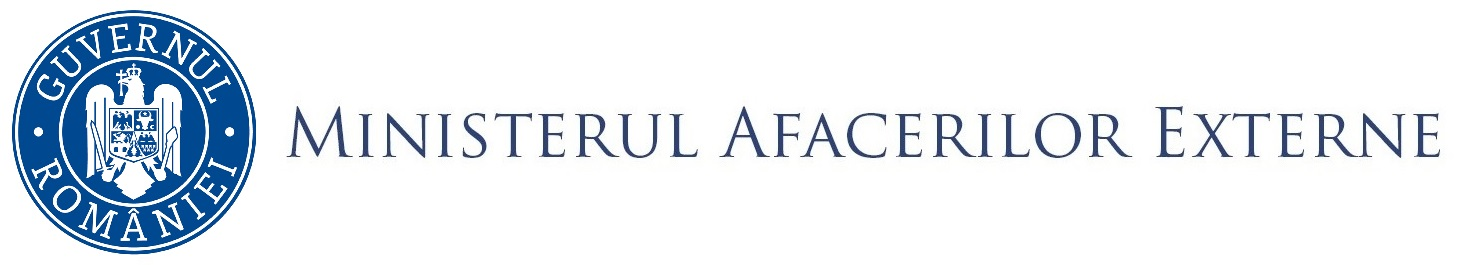
- Logo of arms of the Romanian Ministry of Foreign Affairs

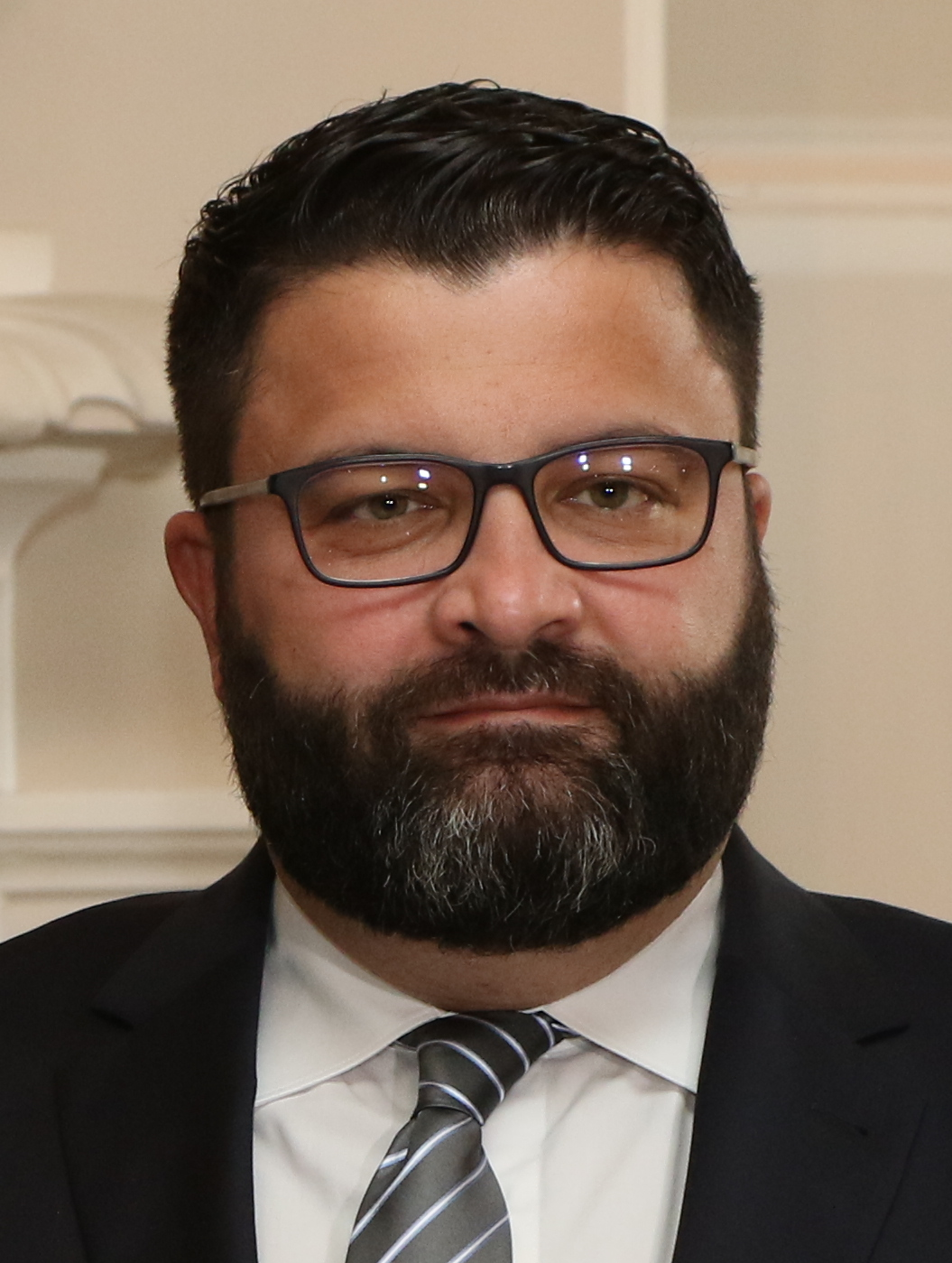
- Incumbent; Dan Neculăescu since 20 October 2026
- Formation: 22 January 1862
- First holder: Apostol Arsache
- Website: www.mae.ro

The Romanian Ministry of Foreign Affairs (Romanian: Ministerul Afacerilor Externe) is the ministry responsible for external affairs of the Romanian Government. The current foreign minister is Dan Neculăescu.

== List of ministers of foreign affairs (1862–present) ==
=== 1862–1989 ===
No.	Name	Term start	Term end	Party
United Principalities
1	Apostol Arsache	22 January 1862	24 June 1862	
2	Alexandru Cantacuzino	24 June 1862	29 September 1862	
3	General Ioan G. Ghica	29 September 1862	29 August 1923	
4	Nicolae Rosetti-Bălănescu	23 August 1863	29 October 1865	
5	Alexandru Papadopol-Calimah	29 October 1865	10 February 1866	
6	Ion Ghica	11 February 1866	10 May 1866	ML
7	Petre Mavrogheni	11 May 1866	13 July 1866	
8	George Barbu Ştirbei	15 July 1866	21 February 1867	
9	Ştefan Golescu^{i}	1 March 1867	5 August 1867	
10	Alexandru Teriachiu	17 August 1867	12 November 1867	
11	Ştefan Golescu^{ii}	13 November 1867	30 April 1868	
12	Nicolae Golescu	1 May 1868	15 November 1868	
13	Dimitrie Ghica	16 November 1868	27 November 1869	
14	Nicolae Calimachi-Catargiu^{i}	28 November 1869	1 February 1870	
	Alexandru G. Golescu	2 February 1870	18 April 1870	
15	Petre P. Carp^{i}	20 April 1870	14 December 1870	
16	Nicolae Calimachi-Catargiu^{ii}	18 December 1870	11 March 1871	
17	Gheorghe Costaforu	11 March 1871	27 April 1873	
18	Vasile Boerescu^{i}	28 April 1873	29 January 1876	
19	Ion Bălăceanu	30 January 1876	31 March 1876	
20	Dimitrie Cornea	4 April 1876	26 April 1876	
21	Mihail Kogălniceanu^{i}	27 April 1876	23 July 1876	PNL
22	Nicolae Ionescu	24 July 1876	2 April 1877	
23	Mihail Kogălniceanu^{ii}	3 April 1877	24 November 1878	PNL
24	Ion C. Câmpineanu^{i}	25 November 1878	10 July 1879	
25	Vasile Boerescu^{ii}	11 July 1879	9 April 1881	
Kingdom of Romania
26	Dimitrie C. Brătianu	10 April 1881	8 June 1881	PNL
27	Eugeniu Stătescu	9 June 1881	30 July 1881	
28	Dimitrie A. Sturdza^{i}	1 August 1881	1 February 1885	
29	Ion C. Câmpineanu^{ii}	2 February 1885	27 October 1885	
	Ion Brătianu	28 October 1885	15 December 1885	PNL
30	Mihail Pherekyde	16 December 1885	21 March 1888	
31	Petre P. Carp^{ii}	21 March 1888	5 November 1889	
32	Alexandru Lahovary^{i}	5 November 1889	21 February 1891	
33	Constantin Esarcu	21 February 1891	26 November 1891	
34	Alexandru Lahovary^{ii}	27 November 1891	3 October 1895	
35	Dimitrie A. Sturdza^{ii}	4 October 1895	21 November 1896	
36	Constantin Stoicescu	21 November 1896	29 March 1897	
37	Dimitrie A. Sturdza^{iii}	31 March 1897	30 March 1899	
38	Ioan Lahovary^{i}	11 April 1899	6 July 1900	
39	Alexandru Marghiloman	7 July 1900	13 February 1901	
40	Dimitrie A. Sturdza^{iv}	14 February 1901	8 January 1902	
41	Ion I. C. Brătianu^{i}	9 January 1902	11 December 1904	PNL
42	General Iacob Lahovary	22 December 1904	8 February 1907	
43	Ioan Lahovary^{ii}	9 February 1907	11 March 1907	
44	Dimitrie A. Sturdza^{v}	12 March 1907	27 December 1908	
45	Ion I. C. Brătianu^{ii}	27 December 1908	1 November 1909	PNL
46	Alexandru Djuvara	1 November 1909	28 December 1910	PNL
47	Titu Maiorescu	29 December 1910	4 January 1914	PC
48	Emanoil Porumbaru	4 January 1914	7 December 1916	
49	Ion I. C. Brătianu^{iii}	8 December 1916	28 January 1918	PNL
	Alexandru Averescu	29 January 1918	4 March 1918	
50	Constantin C. Arion	5 March 1918	23 October 1918	
51	General Constantin Coandă	24 October 1918	28 November 1918	
52	Ion I. C. Brătianu^{iv}	29 November 1918	27 September 1919	PNL
	Arthur Văitoianu	27 September 1919	15 October 1919	
53	Nicolae Mișu	15 October 1919	30 November 1919	
54	Alexandru Vaida-Voevod^{i}	1 December 1919	13 March 1920	
	Ștefan Cicio Pop	15 January 1920	13 March 1920	
55	Duiliu Zamfirescu	13 March 1920	12 June 1920	
56	Take Ionescu	13 June 1920	16 December 1921	
57	Gheorghe Derussi	17 December 1921	19 January 1922	
58	Ion G. Duca	19 January 1922	29 March 1926	
59	Ion Mitilineu	30 March 1926	3 June 1927	
	Barbu Știrbey	4 June 1927	20 June 1927	
60	Ion I. C. Brătianu^{v}	21 June 1927	24 November 1927	PNL
61	Nicolae Titulescu^{i}	24 November 1927	9 November 1928	
62	Gheorghe Mironescu	10 November 1928	9 October 1930	
63	Ion Mihalache	10 October 1930	17 April 1931	
	Constantin Argetoianu	18 April 1931	26 April 1932	
64	Dimitrie I. G. Ghica	27 April 1931	5 June 1932	
65	Alexandru Vaida-Voevod^{ii}	6 June 1932	19 October 1932	
66	Nicolae Titulescu^{ii}	20 October 1932	1 October 1934	
	Gheorghe Tătărescu	2 October 1934	9 October 1934	
67	Nicolae Titulescu^{iii}	10 October 1934	28 August 1936	
68	Victor Antonescu	29 August 1936	28 December 1937	
69	Istrate Micescu	29 December 1937	10 February 1938	
	Gheorghe Tătărescu	11 February 1938	29 March 1938	
70	Nicolae Petrescu-Comnen	30 March 1938	31 January 1939	
71	Grigore Gafencu	1 February 1939	1 June 1940	
72	Ion Gigurtu	1 June 1940	28 June 1940	
73	Constantin Argetoianu	28 June 1940	4 July 1940	
74	Mihail Manoilescu	4 July 1940	14 September 1940	
75	Mihail R. Sturdza	14 September 1940	17 January 1941	
	Ion Antonescu	18 January 1941	1 January 1943	Mil.
76	Mihai Antonescu	1 January 1943	23 August 1944	
77	Grigore Niculescu-Buzești	23 August 1944	3 November 1944	
78	Constantin Vișoianu	4 November 1944	5 March 1945	
79	Gheorghe Tătărescu	6 March 1945	29 December 1947	
Communist Romania
80	Ana Pauker	30 December 1947	9 July 1952	PMR
81	Simion Bughici	10 July 1952	3 October 1955	PMR
82	Grigore Preoteasa	4 October 1955	14 July 1957	PMR
83	Ion Gheorghe Maurer	15 July 1957	15 January 1958	PMR
84	Avram Bunaciu	23 January 1958	20 March 1961	PMR
85	Corneliu Mănescu	20 March 1961	20 August 1965	PMR
85	Corneliu Mănescu	21 August 1965	18 October 1972	PCR
86	George Macovescu	18 October 1972	8 March 1978	PCR
87	Ștefan Andrei	8 March 1978	11 November 1985	PCR
88	Ilie Văduva	11 November 1985	26 August 1986	PCR
89	Ioan Totu	26 August 1986	2 November 1989	PCR
90	Ion Stoian	2 November 1989	22 December 1989	PCR

=== 1989–present ===
Portrait	Name	Term of office		Party	Prime Minister
	Sergiu Celac	26 December 1989	28 June 1990	Independent	Petre Roman
	Adrian Năstase	28 June 1990	18 November 1992	FSN; FDSN	Petre Roman; Theodor Stolojan
	Teodor Meleșcanu	19 November 1992	11 December 1996	FDSN; PDSR	Nicolae Văcăroiu
	Adrian Severin	12 December 1996	29 December 1997	PD	Victor Ciorbea
	Andrei Pleșu	29 December 1997	22 December 1999	Independent	Victor Ciorbea; Gavril Dejeu (Acting); Radu Vasile; Alexandru Athanasiu (Acting)
	Petre Roman	22 December 1999	28 December 2000	PD	Mugur Isărescu
	Mircea Geoană	28 December 2000	28 December 2004	Independent; PSD	Adrian Năstase; Eugen Bejinariu (Acting)
	Mihai Răzvan Ungureanu	28 December 2004	21 March 2007	PNL	Călin Popescu-Tăriceanu
	Călin Popescu-Tăriceanu (Acting)	21 March 2007	5 April 2007	PNL	Himself
	Adrian Cioroianu	5 April 2007	15 April 2008	PNL	Călin Popescu-Tăriceanu
	Lazăr Comănescu	15 April 2008	22 December 2008	PNL	Călin Popescu-Tăriceanu
	Cristian Diaconescu	22 December 2008	1 October 2009	PSD	Emil Boc
	Cătălin Predoiu	1 October 2009	23 December 2009	Independent	Emil Boc
	Teodor Baconschi	23 December 2009	23 January 2012	PDL	Emil Boc
	Cristian Diaconescu	24 January 2012	7 May 2012	UNPR	Emil Boc; Mihai Răzvan Ungureanu
	Andrei Marga	7 May 2012	6 August 2012	PNL	Victor Ponta
	Titus Corlățean	6 August 2012	10 November 2014	PSD	Victor Ponta
	Teodor Meleșcanu	10 November 2014	24 November 2014	Independent	Victor Ponta
	Bogdan Aurescu	24 November 2014	17 November 2015	Independent	Victor Ponta; Gabriel Oprea (Acting); Victor Ponta; Sorin Cîmpeanu (Acting)
	Lazăr Comănescu	17 November 2015	4 January 2017	Independent	Dacian Cioloș
	Teodor Meleșcanu	4 January 2017	15 July 2019	ALDE	Sorin Grindeanu; Mihai Tudose; Mihai Fifor (Acting); Viorica Dăncilă
	Ramona Mănescu	24 July 2019	4 November 2019	ALDE	Viorica Dăncilă
	Bogdan Aurescu	4 November 2019	15 June 2023	Independent	Ludovic Orban; Florin Cîțu; Nicolae Ciucă
	Luminița Odobescu	15 June 2023	23 December 2024	Independent	Marcel Ciolacu
	Emil Hurezeanu	23 December 2024	23 June 2025	Independent	Marcel Ciolacu; Cătălin Predoiu (Acting)
	Oana Țoiu	23 June 2025	20 October 2026	USR	Ilie Bolojan
	Dan Neculăescu	20 October 2026	Incumbent	Independent	Luca Niculescu

== Notes ==
Romania used the Julian calendar until 1919, but all dates are given in the Gregorian calendar.

The following party abbreviations are used:

PNL = National Liberal Party	PC = Conservative Party
PNR = Romanian National Party	PP = People's Party
PCD = Conservative-Democratic Party	PNȚ = National Peasants' Party
PND = Democratic Nationalist Party	PNC = National Christian Party
FRN = National Renaissance Front (from 1940 PN; Party of the Nation)	FP = Ploughmen's Front
PMR = Romanian Workers' Party (from 1965 PCR; Romanian Communist Party)	FSN = National Salvation Front
PDSR = Party of Social Democracy in Romania (from 2001 PSD; Social Democratic Party)	PNȚCD = Christian Democratic National Peasants' Party
PSDR = Romanian Social Democratic Party	PD-L = Democratic Liberal Party
Mil. = Military	Ind. = Independent

Additionally, the political stance of prime ministers prior to the development of a modern party system is given by C (Conservative), MC (Moderate Conservative), RL (Radical Liberal) and ML (Moderate Liberal). Interim officeholders are denoted by italics. For those who held office multiple times, their rank of service is given by a Roman numeral.
