= Ramona Mănescu =

Romanian politician and lawyer

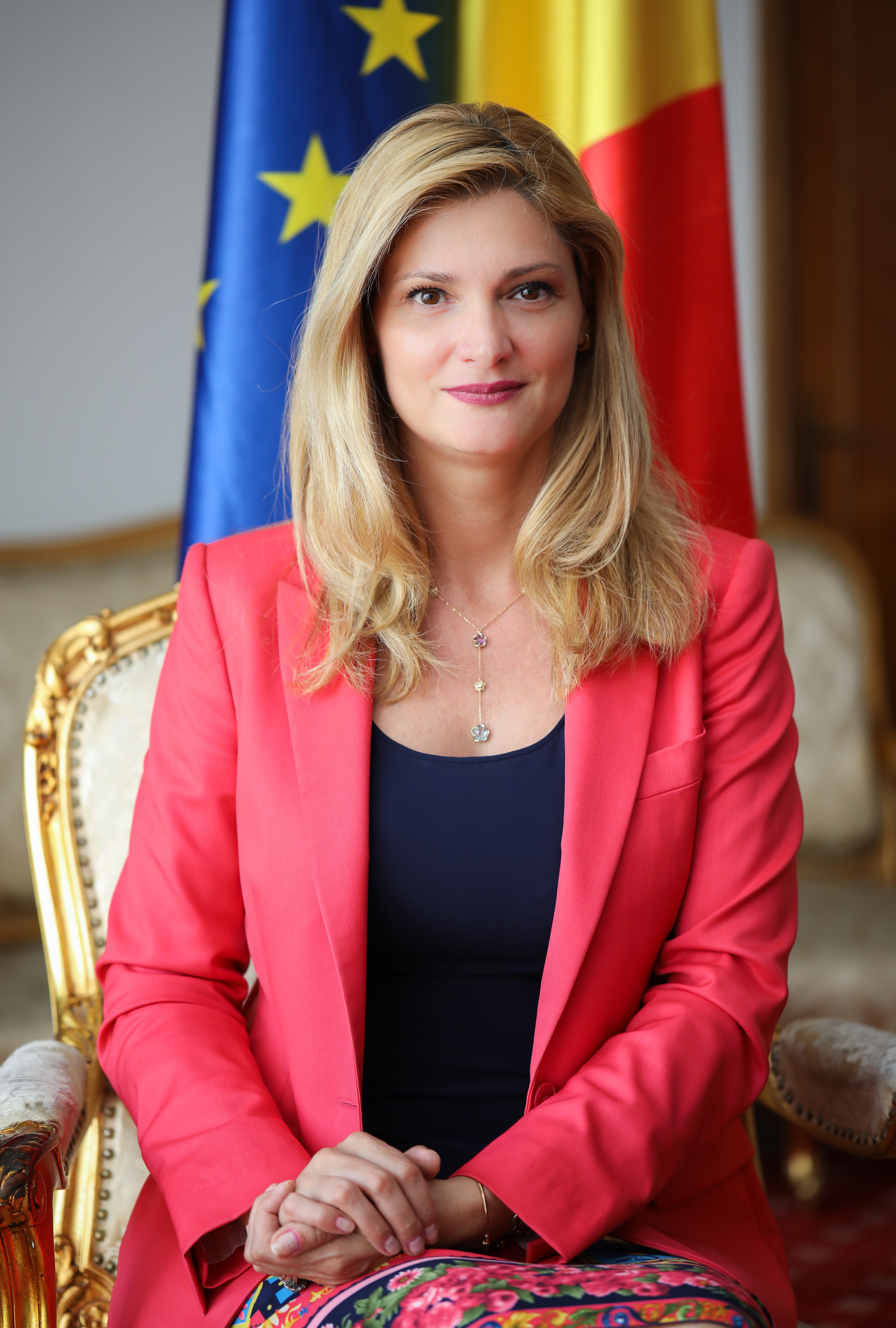
- Official portrait, 2019

Minister of Foreign Affairs
- In office 24 July 2019 – 4 November 2019
- Prime Minister: Viorica Dăncilă
- Preceded by: Teodor Meleșcanu
- Succeeded by: Bogdan Aurescu

Personal details
- Born: 6 December 1972 (age 53) Constanța, Romania
- Party: National Liberal Party (Before 2017); Alliance of Liberals and Democrats (2017–2019); Independent (2019–present)
- Other political affiliations: Alliance of Liberals and Democrats for Europe (Before 2014, 2017–2019); European People's Party (2014–2017)
- Education: University of Bucharest; National Defence University; National University of Political Studies and Public Administration

Ramona Nicole Mănescu (born 6 December 1972, Constanţa) is a Romanian politician and lawyer. From 24 July 2019 to 4 November 2019, she served as minister of Foreign Affairs in the Romanian Government. She was a Member of the European Parliament serving 2007 to 2013 and 2014 to 2019 from the National Liberal Party (until July 2017), active within the European People's Party (European Parliament group). As part of this group she is a member of the European Parliament Committee on Foreign Affairs, vice-chair in the Delegation for relations with the Mashreq countries and a substitute member in the Committee on transport and tourism and in Delegation for relations with the Arab Peninsula.

== Education and academic career ==
Mănescu has a degree in Law from the Faculty of Law, University of Bucharest. After graduating, the liberal MEP has followed several postgraduate studies, with institutions such as: Romanian Diplomatic Institute of the Ministry of Foreign Affairs (2006), National Intelligence Academy, Supreme National Security College, dissertation on "Romanian Defense Industry" (2006), National Defense University - National Defence College, dissertation on "Romania and the European Security and Defence Policy" (2005). Mănescu also has an MA in "International Relations and European Integration" from the National School of Administration and Political Science of Bucharest (2006).

From June 2010 Manescu has been president of the board of the Romanian-Finnish School in Bucharest. Over the course of time she has published articles and reviews in magazines and newspapers in the national press, such as Romanian Journal of Local Public Administration, The Economic Tribune, Euroconsultancy Magazine, The Education Tribune, Political Dial Magazine, The World. In addition to this, Manescu has also published articles in several European publications such as EP Today, The Parliament Magazine and The Regional Review. She is co-author of the photo albums: Bucharest - palaces and monuments and Bucharest - portrait of a city.

== Political career ==
Mănescu has been a member of the National Liberal Party (PNL) since 1990 till July 2017. From 1996 to 1997 she was president of the National Liberal Youth Organisation of Bucharest's District 6 and then joined the Foreign Relations Department of the National Liberal Party (1996–2004). From 2001 to 2002 she has been an International Officer and then was elected vice president of the National Liberal Youth Organisation (TNL). Mănescu was also a rapporteur of the Committee on Foreign Affairs from the Delegation of National Representatives of the Liberal Party.

From 2002 until 2005 she was part of the Executive Committee of District 6 of the NLP and then, for two years (2002–2004), she has worked as a Parliamentary Expert in the Romanian Parliament, serving as adviser to the vice-president of the Commission of Defense, Internal Affairs and National Security in the Chamber of Deputies.

In 2003 she became vice president of the International Federation of Liberal Youth (IFLRY), a function she held until 2005. She then became increasingly involved in projects that aim to support young people, which lead to her becoming a vice-president of the National Authority for Youth, with the rank of Under Secretary of State (2005–2007). Mănescu has also been a consultant for the program "Media Awareness - Understanding and Accessing the Media and its Role", while also coordinating the project "Empowerment of Women in Politics", Poland (2004). She has been a lecturer for several conferences: "Conflict management - training young people", "Regional Development Partnership", "Globalization, 90 years of Romanian Diplomacy" (2003) and coordinator of the project "Human Rights and International Law", Strasbourg, France (2003)

She is a Member of the European Parliament (2007–present). Between 2007 and 2014 she was part of the ALDE group in the European Parliament, where she also held the position of vice-president (11 November 2012 - June 2014) of the ALDE Party (Alliance of Liberals and Democrats for Europe Party). As a member of this group she is a coordinator in the Regional Development Committee and a member in the Committee on Employment and Social Affairs.

At the European Parliamentary elections from June 2014, Mănescu renewed her mandate within European Parliament, where she became a member of the European People's Party (European Parliament group).

In July 2017, Mănescu resigned from the PNL. Mănescu is Romania's first female Foreign Minister in Romania's post-democratic era and is the second Romanian female Foreign Minister after Ana Pauker.

== Activity in the European Parliament ==
Mănescu aims to promote the real priorities of Romania in the European Parliament, through a constant "lobbying" activity set to protect the rights of Romanian citizens and their interests. In addition to that, the Liberal MEP supports the improvement of the image that Romania has at European level by carrying out an efficient work within the framework of the European legislature. As an MEP, she can address questions to the European Commission and make interpellations in order to request information regarding the way in which legislation is being enforced in the EU Member States or the way in which the Commission envisions solving a particular issue.

The Regional Development Committee, where Mănescu is a coordinator from the ALDE group, is competent on matters regarding the regional and cohesion policy, in particular: the European Regional Development Fund, the Cohesion Fund and all the other regional policy instruments of the Union; assessing the impact of other Union policies on economic and social cohesion; the coordination of the structural instruments of the Union; the outermost regions and the islands, as well as regarding trans-frontier and interregional cooperation; relations with the Committee of the Regions, interregional cooperation organisations, local and regional authorities.

As a member in the Culture and Education Committee, Mănescu decides on matters relating to the cultural aspects of the European Union, such as: improving the knowledge and dissemination of culture; the protection and promotion of cultural and linguistic diversity; the conservation and safeguarding of cultural heritage, cultural exchanges and artistic creation; the education policy of the European Union, including the higher education area in Europe and the promotion of the system of European schools and lifelong learning; audiovisual policy, as well as cultural and educational aspects of the information society; youth policy and the development of a sports and leisure policy; information and media policy; cooperation with third countries in the areas of culture and education and relations with the relevant international organisations and institutions.

As a coordinator of programmes in the field of youth, Mănescu has contributed to the organisation of a number of events, among which:

- The European Youth Week, 5–11 December 2005, an event organised at local, regional and national level and centralised in Brussels;
- The facilitation of a structured dialogue among all actors involved in youth activities: youth NGOs, young people with fewer opportunities, local and national authorities and the creation of a database in order to realise this dialogue;
- The Youth NGO fair;
- The participation, as a representative of the National Authority for Youth, in cooperation with the Generation Europe Foundation and the Ministry of European Integration, in the editorial committee of the EU-RO Agenda, an educational tool for informing adolescents;
- The collaboration with the "Pro Democraţia" Association and the Chamber of Deputies in organizing the event "Youth Parliament", aimed at giving young people the possibility to understand the importance, role and functions of the Parliament within the framework of the other democratic institutions, familiarizing them with the doctrines of the parliamentary political parties and offering them a practical vision of what the parliamentary activity really entails;
- The organization of the multicultural meeting part of the project "A.C.T.! - Authorities. Twining Cooperation", funded by the European Commission and the National Authority for Youth, aimed at promoting active citizenship among young people and helping develop relations of friendship and solidarity between young people.

== Controversy ==
During her legislative terms as an MEP, Manescu has defended the Azerbaijani regime against the criticism of the European Parliament. In 2015, following the adoption of a resolution criticizing the crack-down on the human rights and oppression of the freedom of expression in the country by the European Parliament, Mănescu made a statement supporting Azerbaijan. She referred to the ″democratic values″ of the country.

Mănescu's pro-Azerbaijani attitude was criticized by human rights organizations, including the Civic Solidarity Platform. The NGO included Mănescu in its investigative report on the European politicians who advocate for Azerbaijan. According to the report with a title "European Values Bought and Sold, An exploration into Azerbaijan's sophisticated system of projecting its international influence, buying Western politicians and capturing intergovernmental organisations", in 2016 Mănescu joined the European People's Party delegation for an observation mission of the controversial constitutional referendum in Azerbaijan. The final report and the composition of the delegation was not published by the European People's Party.

According to above mentioned report "the composition of the delegation can only be deduced from the media quotes and pictures from the media and official presidential website. In these pictures, for example, besides those specifically mentioned in the media, an MEP Ramona Manescu could be seen during the meeting with Aliyev and the press-conference. A week earlier she was on an EU-Azerbaijan Parliamentary Cooperation Committee visit to Baku, where she could be seen posing next to Aliyev. One wonders whether between these two events Ms. Manescu enjoyed Azerbaijani hospitality in Baku for several days".

== Prizes and distinctions ==
In 2008, Mănescu was designated MEP of the Year for Culture and Education, a distinction awarded by The Parliament Magazine.

Political offices
Preceded by Teodor Meleșcanu	Minister of Foreign Affairs; 2019	Succeeded by Bogdan Aurescu
