= Ecaterina Andronescu =

Romanian engineer, professor and politician

Ecaterina Andronescu KSR
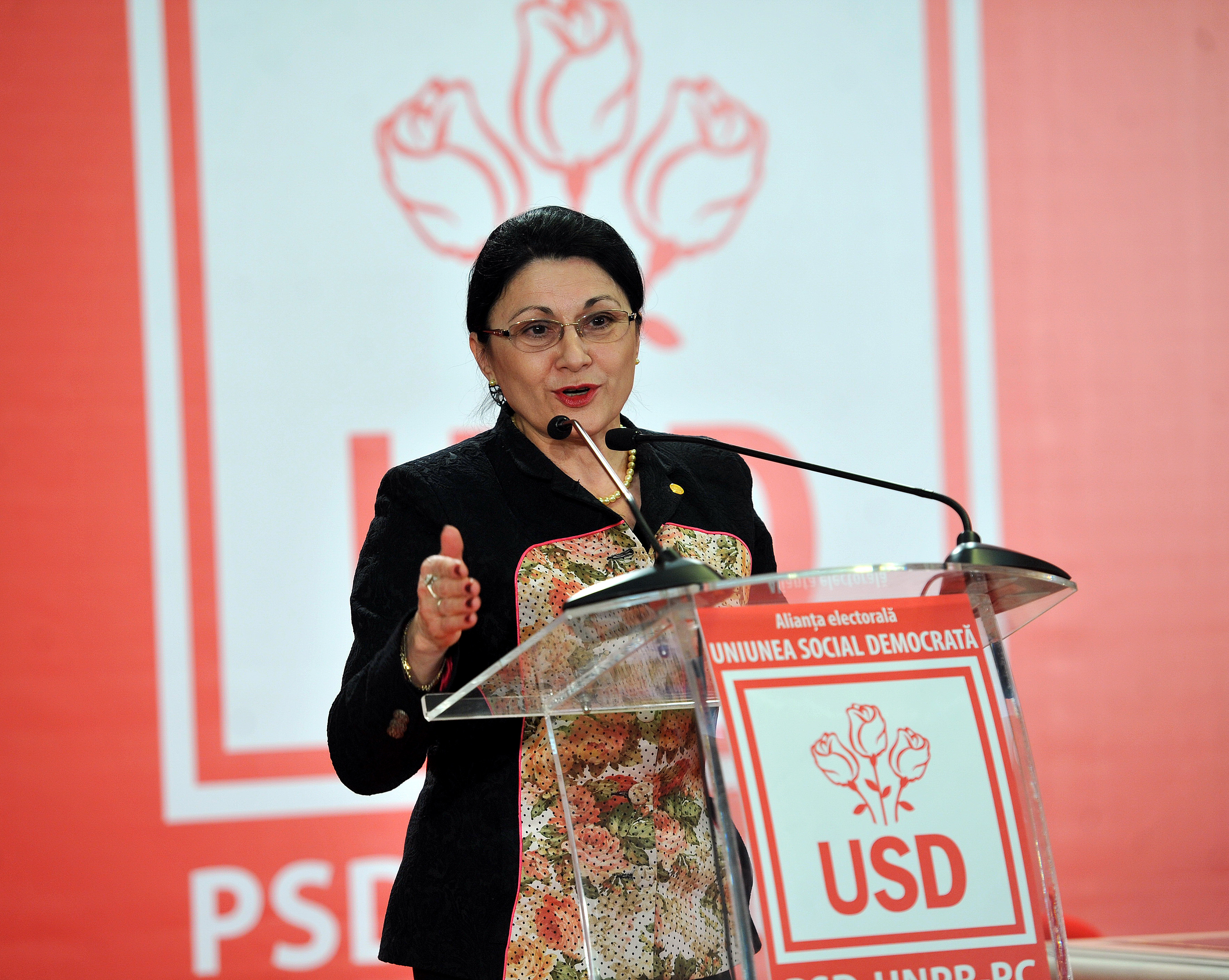

Minister of Education
- In office 20 November 2018 – 2 August 2019
- Prime Minister: Viorica Dăncilă
- Preceded by: Valentin Popa
- In office 2 July 2012 – 21 December 2012
- Prime Minister: Victor Ponta
- Preceded by: Ioan Mang
- Succeeded by: Remus Pricopie
- In office 22 December 2008 – 1 October 2009
- Prime Minister: Emil Boc
- Preceded by: Anton Anton
- Succeeded by: Daniel Funeriu
- In office 28 December 2000 – 19 June 2003
- Prime Minister: Adrian Năstase
- Preceded by: Andrei Marga
- Succeeded by: Alexandru Athanasiu

Senator of Romania
- In office 30 November 2008 – 20 December 2020

Deputy of Romania
- In office 22 November 1996 – 14 December 2008

Personal details
- Born: 7 April 1948 (age 78) Malovăț, Mehedinți County, Romanian People's Republic
- Party: Social Democratic Party (PSD)
- Education: Politehnica University of Bucharest
- Website: ecaterinaandronescu.wordpress.com

Ecaterina Andronescu KSR (Romanian pronunciation: [ekateˈrina androˈnesku]; born 7 April 1948) is a Romanian engineer, professor, and politician. A member of the Social Democratic Party (PSD), she sat in the Romanian Chamber of Deputies from 1996 to 2008, representing Bucharest, and was a Senator from 2008 until 2020, for the same city. In the Adrian Năstase cabinet, she was Education Minister from 2000 until June 2003. She held the same position in the cabinet of Emil Boc from 2008 to 2009, in the Victor Ponta cabinet during 2012, and finally in the Viorica Dăncilă cabinet for under 9 months between November 2018 and August 2019. She is married and has one child. Before her political career, she was the dean of the Industrial Chemistry Faculty at the Politehnica University of Bucharest from 1992 to 2004, and the university's rector from 2004 to 2012.

== Biography ==
=== Background and first ministerial position ===
She was born in Malovăț, Mehedinți County and became an engineer in 1972 upon graduation from the Oxidic Materials Science and Engineering department of the Politehnica University of Bucharest's Industrial Chemistry Faculty. In 1982, she earned a doctorate in the same field, and pursued further studies in Western Europe in the 1990s. From 1972 to 1983, she was an assistant lecturer at Politehnica, then lecturer from 1983 to 1990. From 1990 to 1994 she was a reader there, and she has been a professor at the same institution since 1994. From 1989 to 1992, she was assistant dean of the Industrial Chemistry Faculty, and dean from 1992 to 2004. She became the university's rector in 2004, serving until 2012. She has published over 155 scientific works in specialty journals in Romania and abroad; had over 60 scientific research contracts, including abroad; published three books; and has been awarded a patent.

In 1996, Andronescu joined the Party of Social Democracy in Romania (PDSR; PSD since 2001). She had been a secretary of state at the Education Ministry since the preceding year, and at the autumn 1996 elections (which the PDSR lost), she gained a seat in the Chamber and left the ministry. Until 2000, she was secretary of its committee on education, science and youth, continuing as a member until 2008. Re-elected in 2000, she was appointed to the incoming Năstase cabinet, serving until 2003, when Alexandru Athanasiu replaced her.

As minister, she took a number of controversial decisions, including the reintroduction of a required examination for entering university faculties; changing of the modality of admission to high schools; and a change in the method for correcting the baccalaureate. Critics charged that these "experiments" had introduced "anachronism and chaos" into the Romanian educational system, perturbing both pupils and teachers, and Andronescu's reputed inability to justify and sustain her decisions earned her the nickname of Abramburica (a coined term mixing abracadabra and brambura, "aimless").

=== Opposition and return to government ===
She was again elected to the Chamber in 2004, and to the Senate in 2008. During the latter campaign, she charged the incumbent National Liberal Party (PNL) government with immorality, corruption and incompetence regarding education, and touted her 2001–2003 efforts to introduce computers into classrooms and build gyms; these two programmes were themselves criticised at the end of 2004, after the PSD had been voted out of office, for the computerisation effort's weak results and for both having been undertaken after no-bid contracts worth tens of millions of dollars. Additionally, during 2008, she initiated a law raising teachers' salaries by 50%; this measure won unanimous parliamentary approval.

Following her election to the Senate, where she served on the culture committee until 2010, also becoming vice president of the education committee in 2009, she was named Education Minister once again. During this cabinet stint, Andronescu again attracted controversy. In May 2009, the authors of the nationwide high school admission test made two errors when writing the questions, prompting the resignation of two Education Ministry employees, and contributing to worries among PSD leaders that Andronescu was damaging their party's image. She later indicated a willingness to scrap the test in its current form, citing unpopularity among teachers. That July, she announced her ministry would no longer issue diplomas for the private Spiru Haret University (and might seek its outright closure), claiming that institution had failed to undergo accreditation and authorisation for its offerings. This action reportedly displeased PSD president Mircea Geoană for not being cleared with him in advance; the university itself took the government to court and won the right to continue operations.

She worked on pushing a new educational code through Parliament, but the PSD's former government partner, the Democratic Liberal Party (PDL), has its own proposals; despite her expressed wish, the debate became entangled in the autumn presidential campaign, where the parties are supporting rival candidates. In September, Prime Minister Boc threatened Andronescu with dismissal if she did not annul an order allowing the Education Minister (as opposed to school inspectors) the power to change school directors; she countered that this would decrease the politicisation of the process, while Geoană commented that Boc alone could not dismiss her without consulting his party. Boc's move followed rising discontent with her within the PDL, whose members Ioan Oltean and Radu Berceanu suggested that Andronescu herself was trying to politicise the educational process. The PDL also suggested that Andronescu's proposals aimed at sabotaging Boc's own reform project, which the party claimed was addressing the fundamental issues. Together with her PSD colleagues, Andronescu resigned from the cabinet on 1 October 2009, in protest at the dismissal of vice prime minister and Interior Minister Dan Nica. Boc himself took over her ministry, on an interim basis.

=== Plagiarism controversy and subsequent developments ===
In July 2012, Andronescu became Education Minister a third time, appointed by Prime Minister Ponta. When President Traian Băsescu signed off on her appointment, he requested that she confirm she had not plagiarized her doctoral thesis. This came amid a backdrop of plagiarism scandals that, among other effects, had forced her predecessor Ioan Mang to resign. Andronescu, although finding the request "demeaning" for her professional career, declared she had never committed plagiarism. That November, integru.org, a Romanian website run by anonymous academics and focused on plagiarism detection charged that for a 2003 article, Andronescu and her co-author had lifted significant passages without attribution from three other works. The allegations were published by Frankfurter Allgemeine Zeitung; in response, the minister stated that her actions did not amount to plagiarism. Also in the same period, an article in Nature charged she had signed off on a plagiarized €500,000 research funding request; she denied ever having signed the document. A third incident arose over an article published, with minor differences, four times between 2006 and 2007; integru.org alleged that Andronescu, whose name appeared on the authors' list the last three times but not the first, plagiarized the first group of authors. At the December election, she retained her Senate seat with a nationwide high of 68%, but was not reappointed to Ponta's cabinet when it formed later in the month. In the Senate, she has served as president of the education committee since 2012. At the 2014 European Parliament election, she won a seat as an MEP. However, Ponta, as party chief, persuaded her not to take office, saying she was too important domestically to be permitted a job abroad. She was returned to the Senate at the 2016 parliamentary election.

Within her party, Andronescu has held several posts since 1997: vice-president of its Bucharest chapter; member of the central executive bureau; member of the national council; vice president, since 2010; and interim president of its Bucharest chapter, since 2012. In 2002, she was made a Knight of the Order of the Star of Romania. The following year, she became a corresponding member of the Baia Mare Technical Academy. She holds honorary doctorates from five Romanian universities.

=== Fourth Minister of Education term ===
Following the resignation of Valentin Popa after a controversy regarding the teaching of the Romanian language in areas with Hungarian ethnic majorities, Andronescu was nominated for a fourth time to occupy the Education Ministry. She was removed from office on 2 August 2019 by prime minister Viorica Dăncilă following a controversial statement that "young girls should know better than to get in cars with strangers" regarding the kidnapping of Alexandra Măceșanu and Luiza Melencu.
