= Ministry of Education (Romania) =

Government ministry of Romania

Ministry of Education (many previous names – see prose)
- (Romanian: Ministerul Educației)
- Coat of arms of Romania

Agency overview
- Formed
- Type: Education
- Headquarters
- Minister responsible: Spiru Haret (first) Sorin Costreie (since 20 October 2026 (0 days ago))
- Website: edu.ro

The Ministry of Education (Romanian: Ministerul Educației) is one of the ministries of the Government of Romania.

== Former names of the ministry ==
Over the years, the ministry changed its name many times. Initially, it was called the Ministry of Religion and Public Instruction (Romanian: Ministerul Religiei și Instrucțiunii Publice), then the Ministry of Public Instruction (Romanian: Ministerul Instrucțiunii Publice), then it changed to the Ministry of Teaching (Romanian: Ministerul Învățământului), the Ministry of Teaching and Science (Romanian: Ministerul Învățământului și Științei), then changed back to the Ministry of Teaching (Romanian: Ministerul Învățământului).

When Andrei Marga became minister in 1997, he introduced the largest reform measures, starting with the name of the institution: the Ministry of National Education (Romanian: Ministerul Educației Naționale). In 2000, the name was changed to the Ministry of Education and Research (Romanian: Ministerul Educației și Cercetării). This name was kept until April 2007, when it changed to the Ministry of Education, Research and Youth (Romanian: Ministerul Educației, Cercetării și Tineretului).

On 21 December 2012, the name was changed to the Ministry of National Education (Romanian: Ministerul Educației Naționale) and was kept until 17 December 2014, when it changed to the Ministry of National Education and Scientific Research (Romanian: Ministerul Educaței Naționale și Cercetării Științifice) This name was kept until 4 January 2017, when it changed back to the Ministry of National Education. Starting with 1 April 2021, it changed to the Ministry of Education.

== Ministers ==
=== Since 1989 ===
Minister title	No.	Name	Term start	Term end	Party	Cabinet
Minister of Teaching	1	Mihai Șora	30 December 1989	28 June 1990	Independent	Roman I
Minister of Teaching and Science	2	Gheorghe Ștefan	29 June 1990	16 October 1991	FSN	Roman II
Minister of Teaching and Science	2	Gheorghe Ștefan	29 June 1990	16 October 1991	FSN	Roman III
Minister of Teaching and Science	3	Mihail Golu	17 October 1991	19 November 1992	FSN	Stolojan
Minister of Teaching	4	Liviu Maior	20 November 1992	11 December 1996	PDSR	Văcăroiu
Minister of Teaching	5	Virgil Petrescu	12 December 1996	4 December 1997	PNȚCD	Ciorbea
Minister of National Education	6	Andrei Marga	5 December 1997	27 December 2000	PNȚCD	Ciorbea
Minister of National Education	6	Andrei Marga	5 December 1997	27 December 2000	PNȚCD	Vasile
Minister of National Education	6	Andrei Marga	5 December 1997	27 December 2000	PNȚCD	Isărescu
Minister of National Education	7	Ecaterina Andronescu	28 December 2000	18 June 2003	PDSR/PSD	Năstase
Ministry of Education, Research and Youth	8	Alexandru Athanasiu	19 June 2003	28 December 2004	PSD	Năstase
Ministry of Education and Research	8	Alexandru Athanasiu	19 June 2003	28 December 2004	PSD	Năstase
Ministry of Education, Research and Youth	9	Mircea Miclea	29 December 2004	9 November 2005	PD	Tăriceanu I
Ministry of Education, Research and Youth	10	Mihai Hărdău	10 November 2005	4 April 2007	PD	Tăriceanu I
Ministry of Education, Research and Youth	11	Cristian Adomniței	5 April 2007	7 October 2008	PNL	Tăriceanu II
Ministry of Education, Research and Youth	12	Anton Anton	8 October 2008	21 December 2008	PNL	Tăriceanu II
Ministry of Education, Research and Innovation	(7)	Ecaterina Andronescu	22 December 2008	30 September 2009	PSD	Boc I
Ministry of Education, Research and Innovation	-	Emil Boc	1 October 2009	22 December 2009	PDL	Boc I
Ministry of Education, Research and Innovation	13	Daniel Funeriu	23 December 2009	8 February 2012	PDL	Boc II
Ministry of Education, Research and Youth	14	Cătălin Baba	9 February 2012	6 May 2012	PDL	Ungureanu
Ministry of Education, Research, Youth and Sport	14	Cătălin Baba	9 February 2012	6 May 2012	PDL	Ungureanu
Ministry of Education, Research, Youth and Sport	15	Ioan Mang	7 May 2012	14 May 2012	PSD	Ponta I
Ministry of Education, Research, Youth and Sport	-	Liviu Pop	15 May 2012	1 June 2012	Independent	Ponta I
Ministry of Education, Research, Youth and Sport	(7)	Ecaterina Andronescu	2 June 2012	20 December 2012	PSD	Ponta I
Ministry of National Education	16	Remus Pricopie	21 December 2012	17 December 2014	PSD	Ponta II
Ministry of National Education and Scientific Research	17	Sorin Cîmpeanu	18 December 2014	17 November 2015	Independent	Ponta IV
Ministry of National Education and Scientific Research	18	Adrian Curaj	18 November 2015	5 July 2016	Independent	Cioloș
Ministry of National Education and Scientific Research	19	Mircea Dumitru	6 July 2016	4 January 2017	Independent	Cioloș
Ministry of National Education	20	Pavel Năstase	5 January 2017	28 June 2017	PSD	Grindeanu
Ministry of National Education	21	Liviu Pop	29 June 2017	29 January 2018	PSD	Tudose
Ministry of National Education	22	Valentin Popa	29 January 2018	26 September 2018	PSD	Dăncilă
Ministry of National Education	-	Rovana Plumb	27 September 2018	19 November 2018	PSD	Dăncilă
Ministry of National Education	(7)	Ecaterina Andronescu	20 November 2018	2 August 2019	PSD	Dăncilă
Ministry of National Education	(22)	Valentin Popa	2 August 2019	4 November 2019	PSD	Dăncilă
Ministry of Education and Research	23	Monica Anisie	4 November 2019	23 December 2020	PNL	Orban I
Ministry of Education and Research	23	Monica Anisie	4 November 2019	23 December 2020	PNL	Orban II
Ministry of Education	(17)	Sorin Cîmpeanu	23 December 2020	25 November 2021	PNL	Cîțu
Ministry of Education	(17)	Sorin Cîmpeanu	25 November 2021	29 September 2022	PNL	Ciucă
Ministry of Education	24	Ligia Deca	3 October 2022	15 June 2023	Independent	Ciucă
Ministry of Education	24	Ligia Deca	15 June 2023	23 December 2024	Independent	Ciolacu I
Ministry of Education and Research	25	Daniel David	23 December 2024	23 June 2025	Independent	Ciolacu II
Ministry of Education and Research	25	Daniel David	23 June 2025	14 January 2026	Independent	Bolojan
Ministry of Education and Research	26	Mihai Dimian	3 March 2026	20 October 2026	Independent	Bolojan
Ministry of Education and Research	27	Sorin Costreie	20 October 2026	incumbent	Independent	Niculescu
