= Alina Bârgăoanu =

Romanian professor

- Born: April 21, 1974 (age 52)
- Occupations: Dean of the faculty of communication and public relations of SNSPA
- Board member of: President of the board of the European Institute of Romania

Academic background
- Education: National University of Theatrical and Cinematographic Art

Academic work
- Discipline: Communication science European studies
- Institutions: National University of Political Studies and Public Administration

Alina Bârgăoanu is a Romanian university professor and the dean of the faculty of communication and public relations of the National University of Political Studies and Public Administration (SNSPA) in Bucharest, of which she was the acting rector between 2012 and 2014. She is also the current chair of the board of the European Institute of Romania, a public institution that supports the government of Romania in its policy making as a member of the European Union. She is the holder of a Jean Monnet chair, and is the author or co-author of books and articles in the fields of communication, disinformation and European Union affairs.

== Achievements ==
In April 2012, Bârgăoanu became the dean of the faculty of communication and public relations of SNSPA. Between December 2012 and December 2014, Bârgăoanu was the acting rector of this university, replacing Remus Pricopie, who was appointed minister of education of Romania. In October 2014, she was appointed president of the board of the European Institute of Romania, a public institution that provides expertise in EU affairs to the Romanian government, co-ordinates publications and training courses, and translates the Official Journal of the European Union. Since 2014, she is also chair of the temporary working group on Communication and European Public Sphere at ECREA, the European Communication Research and Education Association. In 2015, Bârgăoanu sponsored the award of the degree of doctor honoris causa by SNSPA to Simon Hix, Harold Laski professor of political science at the London School of Economics and Political Science and fellow of the British Academy. In 2017, she sponsored the award of the degree of doctor honoris causa by SNSPA to Ian Goldin, professor at the University of Oxford and former director of the Oxford Martin School.

Bârgăoanu is the founder of the Center for EU Communication Studies from NUPSPA and of the online magazine Convorbiri Europene. She was also lecturer within the MBA programme "Process and Project Management" of the Vienna University of Economics and Business (2011–2012). In December 2017, Bârgăoanu was appointed an expert of the newly created European Union High Level Group on fake news and online disinformation. Between 20 October 2018 and 1 March 2019 she was a visiting scholar at the Minda de Gunzburg Center for European Studies at Harvard University. She is now a member of the advisory board of the European Digital Media Observatory and editor-in-chief of the Antifake newsletter, a project funded by the German Marshall Fund of the United States, Bucharest office.

== Publications ==
Books

- Bârgăoanu, Alina, #Fakenews. Noua cursă a înarmării. Evrika, 2018.
- Alina Bârgăoanu, Raluca Buturoiu, and Loredana Radu, (eds.) Why Europe?: Narratives and Counter-narratives of European Integration. Peter Lang AG, 2017.
- Alina Bârgăoanu, Loredana Radu, and Diego Varela, eds. United by or Against Euroscepticism? An Assessment of Public Attitudes towards Europe in the Context of the Crisis: An Assessment of Public Attitudes Towards Europe in the Context of the Crisis. Cambridge Scholars Publishing, 2015.
- Radu L., Bârgăoanu A., Corbu, N. (coord.) (2013). The Crisis of the European Union. Identity, Citizenship, and Solidarity Reassessed. București: comunicare.ro
- Bârgăoanu A., Negrea E. (2011). Comunicarea în Uniunea Europeană. Modele teoretice şi aspecte practice (eds.). București: comunicare.ro.
- Bârgăoanu A. (2011). Examenul Schengen. În căutarea sferei publice europene. București: comunicare.ro.
- Bârgăoanu A. (2009). Fondurile europene. Strategii de promovare şi utilizare. București: Tritonic.
- Dobrescu P., Bârgăoanu A., Corbu N. (2007). Istoria comunicării. București: comunicare.ro.
- Bârgăoanu A. (2006). Tirania actualității. O introducere în istoria și teoria ştirilor. București: Tritonic.
- Dobrescu P., Bârgăoanu A. (2003, 2001). Mass media şi societatea. București, Editura: comunicare.ro.
- Dobrescu P., Bârgăoanu A., (2002). Mass media: puterea fără contraputere, București: All.
- Dobrescu P., Bârgăoanu A., (2001). Geopolitica. București: comunicare.ro.

Articles/ Book chapters/ Conference papers

- Durach, F., Buturoiu, R., Craiu, D., Cazacu, C, Bârgăoanu, A. (2022). "Crisis of confidence in vaccination and the role of social media". European Journal of Paediatric Neurology, Volume 36, Pages 84–92, doi:10.1016/j.ejpn.2021.12.009
- Bârgăoanu, A., Corbu, N., Buturoiu, R. and Durach, F. (2021), "Managing the COVID-19 pandemic: predictors of trust in institutions in Romania", Kybernetes, doi:10.1108/K-12-2020-0913
- Corbu, N., Bârgăoanu, A., Durach, F., Udrea, G. (2021). "Fake News Going Viral: The Mediating Effect of Negative Emotions". Media Literacy and Research, Vol. 4, No. 2, December
- Volintiru, C., Bârgăoanu, B., Ștefan, G., Durach, F. (2021). "East-West Divide in the European Union: Legacy or Developmental Failure?" Romanian Journal of Communication and Public Relations, vol. 21, no. 1, June 2021
- Corbu, N., Bârgăoanu, A., Buturoiu, R., Ștefăniță, O. (2020). ”Does fake news lead to more engaging effects on social media? Evidence from Romania”. Communications. The European Journal of Communication Research, October 22, 2020.
- Cheregi, B.F., Bârgăoanu, A. (2020). "Branding Romania in the Age of Disruption. Technology as a Soft Power Instrument". Journal of Media Research, vol. 13, no. 3 (38), 5-30.
- Cheregi, B. F., Bârgăoanu, A. (2020). "Branding Romania as a <<Tech Country>>. Nation Branding in Times of Digital Disruption, Redefining Community in Intercultural Context, vol. 9, no. 1, 295-303.
- Bârgăoanu, A., Durach, F. (2020). Clashing Views between the Old and New Members of the European Union. A Socio-economic Divide Narrated as a Political One. In Abraham, F. (ed.). 1989 Annus Mirabilis. Three decades after: desires, achievements, future. București: comunicare.ro, pp. 303–332.
- Bârgăoanu, A., Durach, F., Buturoiu, R. (2020). Reshaping the European Public Sphere: Preliminary Insights into the European Backlash in Central and Eastern Europe. In Winiarska-Brodowska, M. (2020). In Search of a European Public Sphere: Challenges, Opportunities and Prospects, Cambridge Scholars Publishing, 90-115. ISBN 978-1-5275-4705-6
- Bârgăoanu, A., & Durach, F. (2020). The COVID-19 Infodemic – An Accelerated Version of the New Digital Ecosystem. Romanian Journal of Communication and Public Relations, 22(2), 125–129.
- Durach, F., Bârgăoanu, A., Nastasiu, C. (2020). Tackling Disinformation: EU Regulation of the Digital Space. Romanian Journal of European Affairs, vol. 20, no 1 (June), pp. 5–20.
- Bârgăoanu, A. (2019). "The Fight over the Liberal Order as an Instance of the Transatlantic Divide". Romanian Journal of European Affairs, Vol. 19, No.1, June
- Bârgăoanu, A., Radu, L. (2019). "The austerity discourse of the Romanian economic-political elites. Neoliberal or (pseudo)European?”. In Kate Power, Tanweer Ali, Eva Lebdušková (eds). Discourse Analysis and Austerity. Critical Studies from Economics and Linguistics, 1st Edition, Routledge
- Bârgăoanu, A., Durach, F. (2019). "Emerging media – the new <global despots>. How much technology and how much old-fashioned psychology?". In Iancu, I., Balaban, D.C., Hosu, I. (eds.) Communication. Strategic perspectives. Cluj-Napoca: Accent publishing house
- Bârgăoanu, A. & Radu, L. (2018). "Fake news or Disinformation 2.0? Some insights into Romanians’ digital behaviour". Romanian Journal of European Affairs, Vol 18, No. 1

== See also ==
- Claes de Vreese
- Sonia Livingstone
- Miguel Poiares Maduro
- Clare Melford
