= 2023 Romanian teachers' strike =

2023 general strike of teachers in Romania

- Date: 22 May – 12 June 2023 (3 weeks)
- Location: Romania
- Caused by: Low salaries of teachers, compared to other professions in Romania
- Goals: Rising salaries by 25% for all teachers and other education staff
- Methods: Strike action, Protests, Demonstrations
- Status: Strike suspended

Parties
Trade unions: Federation of Free Syndicates in Education; Federation of Syndicates in Education "Spiru Haret"; Supported by: National Trade Union Federation "Alma Mater"	(Romania) Government: Klaus Iohannis; Ciucă Cabinet

Lead figures
Non-centralized leadership	Klaus Iohannis; Nicolae Ciucă; Ligia Deca; Marius Budăi

On 22 May 2023, a general strike was called in Romania's education system, involving 150,000 teachers and another 60,000–70,000 teaching and auxiliary staff, demanding a rise in salaries in education by 25%. During the strike, there have been multiple attempts by syndicates and teachers to negotiate with the Romanian government, as well as with President Klaus Iohannis. Simultaneous demonstrations took place in Bucharest and several other major cities nationwide.

On 12 June 2023, syndicates announced the suspension of the general strike, provided their proposals for wage increase that were accepted several days earlier are approved through a government emergency ordinance, which happened in the meantime.

The strike is the fourth in the education system since the Romanian Revolution, with previous strikes being called in 1999, 2000, and 2005, and saw the cancellation of the 6th grade exams, as well as of the oral tests of the 2023 session of the Baccalaureate.

== Background ==
The protests were caused by the low salaries of teachers who have the average salary in the economy. Teachers' salaries are quite low compared to other professions in Romania. A teacher earns an average of 39,504 lei annually. After 10 years of activity, a teacher can reach 50,897 lei (10,342 EURO) annually and after 15 years of activity teaching staff can earn 53,943 lei (10,961 euros) annually.

Before the general strike, a two-hour warning strike was briefly called on 17 May. A week earlier, almost 10.000 teachers attended a march organized by education syndicates in Bucharest.

== Timeline ==
=== 22 May – 1 June ===
Education syndicates announced a nationwide general strike in the Romanian education system involving some 150.000 teachers and another 60.000 - 70.000 teaching and auxiliary staff, beginning on 22 May 2023 at 8:00 AM EEST, due to low salaries, following failed negotiations between education syndicates and the government in the previous day. Demands include raising salaries to 4.000 lei net for debutante teachers, respectively 7.000 lei net for teachers at the end of their careers, proposal considered "absolutely very hard to fulfill" by the Romanian government, citing a "loss of European funds along with the increase in salaries that would deepen the budget deficit".

Nevertheless, the general strike continued beyond 22 May. The next day, there were consultations between representatives of parents' and students' associations and Prime Minister Nicolae Ciucă, after which the latter stated the demands would be fulfilled in a new unitary wage law that would be finished by 15 July.

On 24 May, syndicates tried new negotiations with government. The government offered to give teachers an amount of 1.000 lei in June and another 1.500 lei in October, however this proposal was rejected by syndicates, instead requesting a 25% increase for every teacher until December. The government rejected this request, insisting that the forms that allow salary increases have been exhausted in the current salary law and that teachers will only receive bonuses of 2.500 lei in two waves. On the same day, Romanian news channel Digi 24 (who is rumoured to be financially backed by the ruling National Liberal Party) claimed that the protests are backed by Russia, something criticised by the other parts of the Romanian press.

On 28 May, the president of the "Spiru Haret" Syndicate of Education Unions, Marius Nistor, stated that the general strike would continue for a second week, announcing a huge rally in Bucharest on 30 May, in which 20,000 people were expected to participate. Simultaneously, there were protests in several other major cities, including Alba Iulia, Brașov, Brăila, Târgu Jiu and Timișoara. Over 10,000 teachers marched to Cotroceni Palace. In the meantime, the unions and teachers wanted to talk to President Klaus Iohannis, an offer that he accepted. Nonetheless, the teachers announced that the general strike continues.

On 31 May, the government offered teachers a raise of 1.000 lei in salaries, after a new attempt at negotiations between the former and the latter, followed by a phased salary increase to the teacher-desired levels by 2026. The next day, the offer was approved by the government through an emergency ordinance. However, syndicates and teachers have also rejected this proposal, and announced that the general strike will continue into June, demanding higher salary increases applied in a shorter term.

The decision by syndicates and teachers to reject the offer had been subject to criticism from parents, especially those of students in the 8th and 12th grades that are about to take the national exams. At the 2nd EPC Summit in Moldova, President Klaus Iohannis also vehemently criticized the decision: "How dare anyone put the national exams in difficulty? ... After the Government gave them [the teachers] everything they asked for [wage increase], now on what grounds does the strike continue?".

=== 6 – 12 June ===
As of 6 June, around 52.8% of education staff were still on general strike, while 15.000 of them have given it up, according to the Minister of Education, Ligia Deca. On 7 June, Marcel Ciolacu and Prime Minister Ciucă announced that the government will adopt a memorandum in which it undertakes that it will apply the salary increase in education. In the meantime, there was an attempt by a parent to overturn the general strike by suing the education syndicates; this request was rejected by the Bucharest Court.

On 9 June, thousands of teachers protested once more at Victory Square in Bucharest, eventually marching to Cotroceni Palace, despite the fact that Iohannis was not there, but in Neptun summer resort. Simultaneously, syndicates tried a new round of negotiations with the government. The government offered a higher increase of salaries from 2024, along with an additional amount of 1.500 lei net given to teachers once every October, until 2027. By the next day, this offer was also rejected by syndicates, with the general strike slated to continue for a fourth week, putting the calendars for 2023's National Evaluation and Baccalaureate tests in danger.

Later, on 10 June, the syndicates announced that the government accepted proposals of increasing salaries by 25%, giving amounts of 1500 lei annually for teaching and auxiliary staff, respectively 500 lei annually for non-teaching staff until 2027, as well as a first wave of 50% from the new salary scale, from 1 January 2024. The next day, syndicates announced that the strike will continue until the proposals are written in an government emergency ordinance.

On 12 June, syndicates announced the suspension of the general strike, under condition that the proposals are approved by the government through an emergency ordinance, which happened in the meantime. Teachers opposing the decision accused the syndicates of "betrayal".

== Impact ==
The 6th grade exams, originally planned for the days of 24 and 25 May, have been delayed two times due to the general strike, prior to their cancellation on 11 June.

Furthermore, on 31 May, the registration period for the Baccalaureate was extended until 9 June. The day of 8 June saw the oral tests of the Baccalaureate being postponed to 14 June, from 12 June as originally set, however they were also cancelled on 11 June.

== See also ==
- 2017–2019 Romanian protests
- 2012–2015 unrest in Romania
