= Daniel David =

Romanian academic and the Head of the Ministry of Education

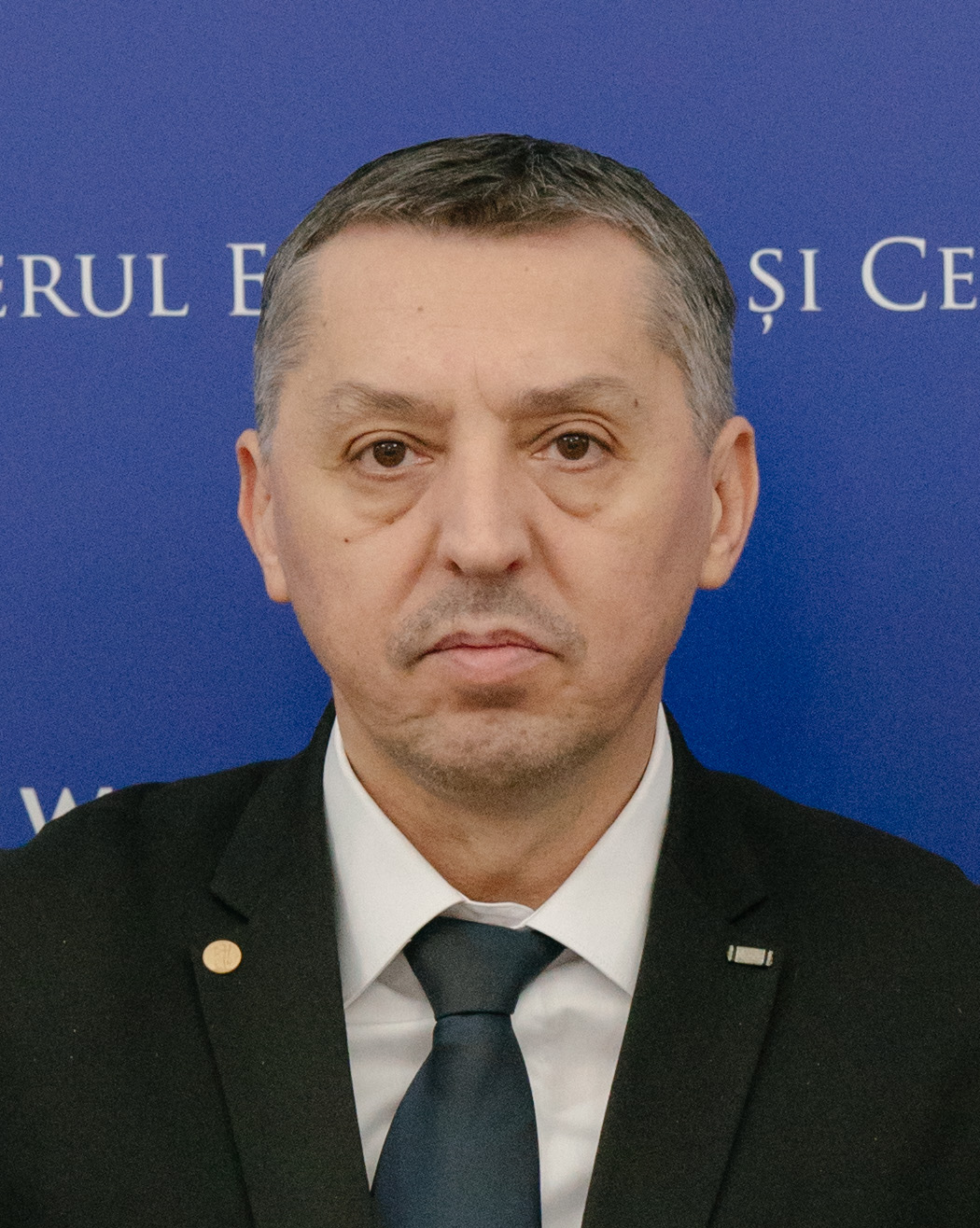
- David in 2025

Minister of Education and Research
- In office 23 December 2024 – 14 January 2026
- Prime Minister: Marcel Ciolacu; Cătălin Predoiu (acting); Ilie Bolojan
- Preceded by: Ligia Deca

Personal details
- Born: 23 November 1972 (age 53) Satu Mare, Romania
- Occupation: Psychologist; University teacher

Daniel-Ovidiu David (born 23 November 1972) is a Romanian academic and politician who served as Minister of Education and Research from 23 December 2024 to 14 January 2026. He was the head of the Department of Clinical Psychology and Psychotherapy of the Babeş-Bolyai University between 2007 and 2012. Daniel David is also an adjunct professor at Icahn School of Medicine at Mount Sinai and is the head of the Research Program at Albert Ellis Institute in New York.

In 2020, he was elected rector of Babeș-Bolyai University. Since 2022 he is a member of both Romanian Academy and Academia Europaea.

== Education ==
David was born in Satu Mare. In 1999 he obtained a Ph.D. degree in psychology from Babeș-Bolyai University with thesis Mecanisme inconștiente de reactualizare a informațiilor, under the direction of Ioan Radu.

== Public activity as a minister and controversies ==
Professor Daniel David served as Minister during a period marked by political crisis, following the annulment of the elections, and by a fiscal-budgetary crisis, with Romania being under the European Commission's excessive deficit procedure.

The QX Reform originated from an initial diagnostic report on the education and research system and was further articulated through the ministerial program ProViziunea–CaleaQX, aiming at structural and paradigmatic reforms that generated intense public debate.

At the pre-university level, the major reform concerned the curriculum, representing the first curriculum reform in 20 years. At the university and research level, the reform initiated the process of evaluation and reorganization of the national research-development-innovation system, while also carrying out the classification of Romanian universities.

=== Scholarships and salaries ===
In 2025, Daniel David stated publicly that the scholarship system is "very complex" and that “properly covering it is not sustainable” in the context of the fiscal and budgetary crisis, while specifying that scholarships would not be "simply cut", but reorganised according to criteria of “rationality and decency”. Several outlets reported that the minister supported keeping only two types of scholarships, merit and social, while removing other categories. A Factual analysis, cited by the press, described as truncated certain public claims about the scale of the system and the figure of “7 billion lei”. In the same year, the press also noted contradictory official messages on whether salaries and scholarships would be fully covered for the whole year, recorded within a matter of months.

=== Details about scholarhips ===
In 2025, the cost of school and university students scholarships is estimated at 6.4 billion lei; cutting the system “back to the pre-law level” would reduce roughly two thirds of that amount, i.e. ~4.27 billion lei, equal to ~0.22% of the projected GDP of 1.912 trillion lei, while abolishing scholarships entirely would represent ~0.33% of GDP; regarding education salaries, no reductions are provided for 2025, since an emergency ordinance keeps gross public-sector pay at the previous year's level, so the direct impact of any salary "cuts" on GDP is zero in 2025 (the announced measures target freezes/efficiencies, not nominal decreases). Funding for school student scholarships decreased from approximately 4.7 billion lei in 2025 to approximately 3 billion lei in 2026, while funding for university student scholarships, supplemented through European funds, remained at the level of the 2024–2025 academic year.

=== Budget impact of the announced measures ===
In 2025, the total budget proposed for education was estimated at 61.8 billion lei for schooling and 63.98 billion lei for the entire ministry after reorganisation, i.e. about 4.5% of GDP for education including all sources. The cost of school and university students scholarships was estimated by the press, based on official data, at around 6.4 billion lei in 2025, three times the Research budget. In this context, the resetting of scholarships has a limited budgetary effect relative to the total allocation for education, a point also acknowledged by the minister, who presented the package as a set of “crisis survival” measures rather than structural reform.

=== Requests for criminal prosecution ===
In June 2025, the Union of Student Representatives and the Federation of Parents and Legal Guardians announced that they would file criminal complaints against the minister, alleging abuse of office for approving high school curricula without observing decision-making transparency and for proposals to reduce scholarships. The announcement was made through public press releases and picked up by the media. These requests are actions by organisations and do not amount to a decision by judicial authorities.

=== CREIC UBB Cluj ===
In autumn 2025, the relocation of some activities of UBB's Faculty of Mathematics and Computer Science to the CREIC and TEAM buildings in Cluj Innovation Park triggered student protests, citing conditions and travel logistics. The UBB leadership announced timetable adjustments and the redistribution of some activities to central-area spaces in response to the demands. In the same period, although he was no longer the university's acting rector, local media reported protests planned at public events attended by the minister.

=== Political reactions ===
A simple motion against the minister was filed in the Senate in September 2025; Daniel David stated publicly that he would resign if the motion were adopted. The motion, however, did not pass in the parliamentary vote.

== National achievements ==
David created the first school of cognitive-behavioral therapy (CBT) in Romania, based on international principles, recognized as such by the founders of this field such as Albert Ellis and Aaron T. Beck; he and his trainee also extended the application of CBT in education (e.g., rational-emotive & cognitive-behavioral education) and organizational fields (e.g., cognitive-behavioral coaching). He is a Fellow in the Academy of Cognitive Therapy, U.S.A. and the national representative in the Social Sciences Standing Committee at the European Science Foundation. He is among those who introduced in Romanian academic psychology the evolutionary psychology and genetic counseling as modern interdisciplinary approaches between psychology and biology. David reintroduced and up-dated the Retman concept, and is the coordinator of the team that created the comics, stories and cartoons with this character.

He has promoted the reform of Romanian clinical psychology and psychotherapy based on modern principles. Such a reform was necessary, taking into account that during the communist period of Romania both clinical psychology and psychotherapy were practically forbidden by the communist regime, and thus, the field was frozen in time. For example, after the communist era, Szondi and Lusher, among other projective test, were still commonly used for clinical testing. David, who studied in the U.S.A. for both his doctoral and postdoctoral studies, was one of the leaders of the first generations of psychologists after the anti-communist revolution of 1989, as since the 2000s, he has constantly been the most cited Romanian psychologist in the international literature. Given that he had several governmental and professional positions/leadership, he marked the reform of the clinical field in Romania, helping in moving the field from a '70s style approach to the modern one. For his merits in research and education he was knighted in 2008 by the President of Romania, in the National Order of Knights for Merit. Also, for the advanced research programs that he has initiated, in 2014, together with other important contemporary researchers, he received the innovation award, part of the "Foreign Policy Romania" Gala. In November 2017, he has been elected as the president of the Romanian Association of Psychologists, association which has been inactive for several years. The goals for his mandate are to reestablish the association as a professional and scientific body supporting the development of the professional practice in Romania. In March 2020, he was elected as the Rector of Babeș-Bolyai University for a four years mandate.

== International achievements ==
He has contributed to the assimilation of cognitive science principles in the clinical field. A more specific contribution was focused on developing the theory and practice of rational-emotive and cognitive-behavioral therapies (CBT/REBT), which brought him both the Aaron T. Beck Award and the Albert Ellis Award of the International Institute for the Advanced Study of Psychotherapy and Applied Mental Health. In 2004 he was invited as "Guest Editor" by the Journal of Clinical Psychology to organize a special issue titled: "Cognitive revolution in clinical psychology: Beyond the behavioral approach" in order to present the state-of-the-art regarding the impact of the cognitive revolution on the clinical field. As founding editor of the Journal of Cognitive and Behavioral Psychotherapies (abstracted: SSCI/Thomson ISI Web of Science; SCOPUS; PsycInfo; IBSS and full text: EBSCO; ProQuest), this journal, now known as Journal of Evidence-Based Psychotherapies is a Journal focused on evidence-based practice, he has supported the evidence-based approach in the clinical field. At this moment, is co-editor of the prestigious Journal of Rational-Emotive and Cognitive-Behavior Therapy. In 2013, the two research platforms, The SkyRa Platform for Clinical Cognitive Neurosciences and the PsyTech-Matrix Platform in Robotics/Robotherapy and Virtual Reality Psychotherapy, that he is coordinating as part of the International Institute for the Advanced Study of Psychotherapy and Applied Mental Health, have both been included in Mapping of the European Research Infrastructure Landscape (MERIL database).

== Selected publications ==
- David, D.; Matu, S.-A.; David, O. A. (2013). "New Directions in Virtual Reality-Based Therapy for Anxiety Disorders". International Journal of Cognitive Therapy. 6 (2): 114–137. doi:10.1521/ijct.2013.6.2.114.
- David, D.; Montgomery, G. H. (2011). "The scientific status of psychotherapies: A new evaluative framework for evidence-based psychosocial interventions". Clinical Psychology: Science and Practice. 18 (2): 89–99. doi:10.1111/j.1468-2850.2011.01239.x.
- David, D., Lynn, A., & Ellis, A. (Ed.) (2010). Rational and irrational beliefs in human functioning and disturbances; Implication for research, theory, and practice. New York: Oxford University Press.
- David, D.; Szentagotai, A.; Lupu, V.; Cosman, D. (2008). "Rational emotive behavior therapy, cognitive therapy, and medication in the treatment of major depressive disorder: a randomized clinical trial, posttreatment outcomes, and six-month follow-up". J Clin Psychol. 64 (6): 728–746. doi:10.1002/jclp.20487. PMID 18473339.
- David, D. (2003). Rational Emotive Behavior Therapy (REBT); The view of a cognitive psychologist. In W. Dryden (Ed.). Theoretical developments in REBT. London: Brunner/Routledge.
- David, D.; Brown, R.; Pojoga, C.; David, A. (2000). "The impact of posthypnotic amnesia and intentional forgetting on implicit and explicit memory". International Journal of Clinical and Experimental Hypnosis. 48 (3): 267–289. doi:10.1080/00207140008415246. PMID 10902293. S2CID 33859463.
- David, D.; et al. (2002). "Romanian psychology on the international psychological scene: A preliminary critical and empirical approach". European Psychologist. 7: 153–160. doi:10.1027//1016-9040.7.2.153. doi:10.1027//1016-9040.7.2.153
- David, D.; Schnur, J.; Belloiu, A. (2002). "Another search for the "hot" cognition: Appraisal irrational beliefs, attribution, and their relation to emotion". Journal of Rational-Emotive and Cognitive-Behavior Therapy. 20 (2): 93–131. doi:10.1023/A:1019876601693. S2CID 141245612.
- David, D.; et al. (2002). "The case of behavior therapy in Romania". Behavior Therapist. 21: 181–186.
- David, D., & Brown, R. (2003). The impact of different directed forgetting instructions on implicit and explicit memory: New evidence from a modified process dissociation procedure. Quarterly Journal of Experimental Psychology, 56A, 211–233.
- David, D.; Montgomery, G.; Holdevici, I. (2003). "Romanian norms for the Harvard group Scale of Hypnotic Susceptibility, Form A.". International Journal of Clinical and Experimental Hypnosis. 51 (1): 66–77. doi:10.1076/iceh.51.1.66.14066. PMID 12825919. S2CID 43459067.
- David, D (2004). "Special issue on the cognitive revolution in clinical psychology: Beyond the behavioral approach-Introductory remarks". Journal of Clinical Psychology. 60 (4): 351–353. doi:10.1002/jclp.10249. PMID 15022266.
- David, D (2004). "Special issue on the cognitive revolution in clinical psychology: Beyond the behavioral approach-Conclusions: Toward and evidence-based psychology and psychotherapy". Journal of Clinical Psychology. 60 (4): 447–451. doi:10.1002/jclp.10257. PMID 15022274.
- David, D.; et al. (2004). "The information-processing approach to the human mind: Basic and beyond". Journal of Clinical Psychology. 60 (4): 353–369. doi:10.1002/jclp.10250. PMID 15022267.
- David, D.; Montgomery, G.; et al. (2004). "Discrimination between hopes and expectancies for nonvolitional outcomes. Psychological phenomenon or artifact?". Personality and Individual Differences. 36 (8): 1945–1952. doi:10.1016/j.paid.2003.08.013. PMC 2577572. PMID 18985169.
- David, D.; Schnur, J.; Birk, J. (2004). "Functional and dysfunctional emotions in Ellis' cognitive theory; An empirical analysis". Cognition and Emotion. 18 (6): 869–880. doi:10.1080/02699930341000185. S2CID 145802428.
- David, D.; Montgomery, M.; Macavei, B.; Bovbjerg, D. (2005). "An empirical investigation of Albert Ellis' binary model of distress". Journal of Clinical Psychology. 61 (4): 499–516. doi:10.1002/jclp.20058. PMID 15529301.
- David, D.; Szentagotai, A. (2006). "Cognition in cognitive-behavioral psychotherapies (CBT); Toward an integrative model". Clinical Psychology Review. 26 (3): 284–298. doi:10.1016/j.cpr.2005.09.003. PMID 16325974.
