= Sorin Cîmpeanu =

Romanian politician

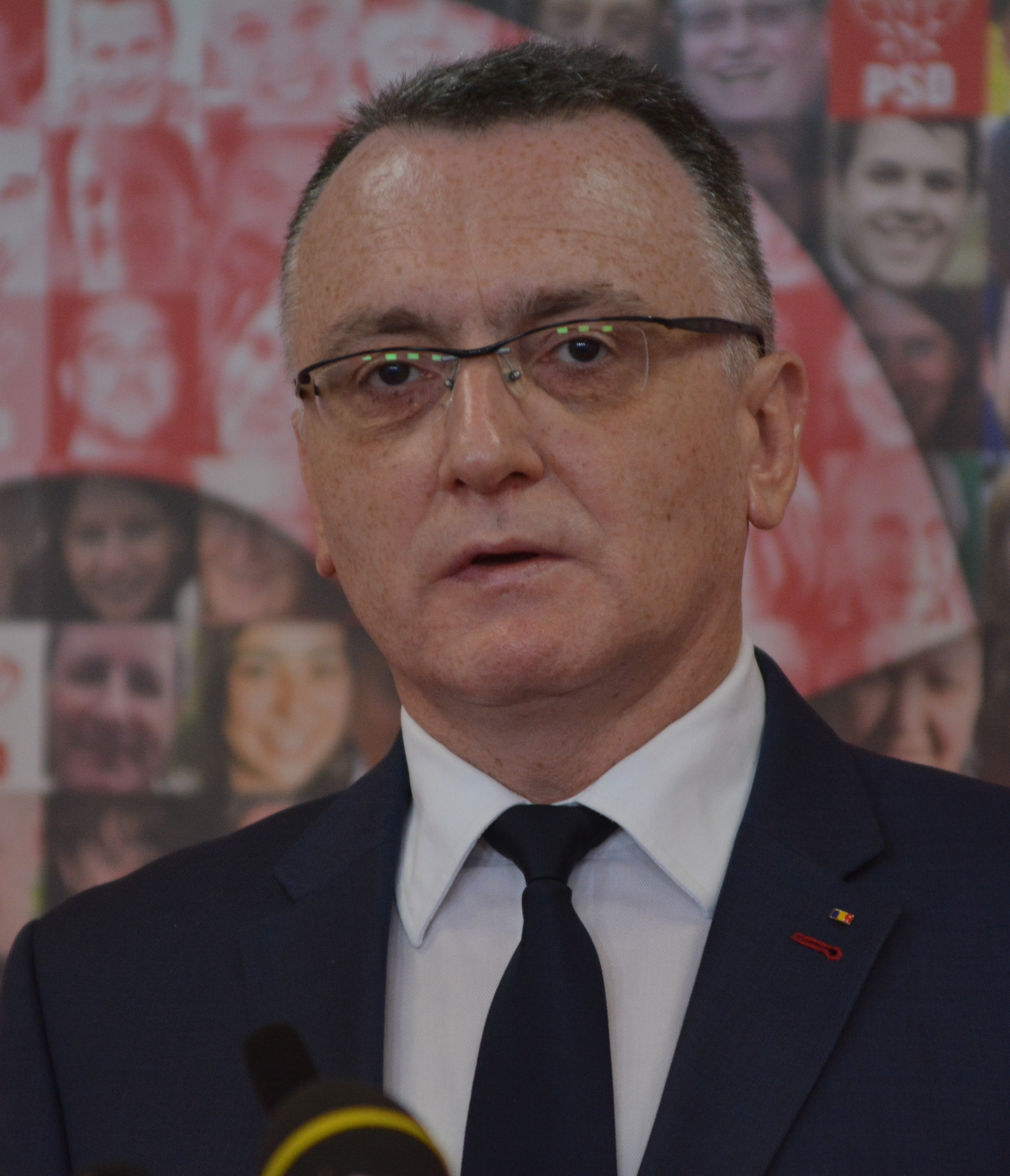
- Cîmpeanu in 2015

Prime Minister of Romania
- Acting
- In office 5 November 2015 – 17 November 2015
- President: Klaus Iohannis
- Preceded by: Victor Ponta
- Succeeded by: Dacian Cioloș

Minister of National Education
- In office 23 December 2020 – 29 September 2022
- Prime Minister: Florin Cîțu; Nicolae Ciucă
- Preceded by: Monica Anisie
- Succeeded by: Ligia Deca
- In office 17 December 2014 – 17 November 2015
- Prime Minister: Victor Ponta; Himself
- Preceded by: Remus Pricopie
- Succeeded by: Adrian Curaj

Member of the Senate of Romania
- Incumbent
- Assumed office 21 December 2020
- Constituency: Bucharest

Member of the Chamber of Deputies
- In office 21 December 2016 – 20 December 2020
- Constituency: Bucharest

Personal details
- Born: Sorin Mihai Cîmpeanu; 18 April 1968 (age 58) Bucharest, Romania
- Party: National Liberal Party (2020–present)
- Other political affiliations: Alliance of Liberals and Democrats (2015–2017); PRO Romania (2017–2020)
- Education: University of Agronomic Sciences and Veterinary Medicine; National Intelligence Academy

Sorin Mihai Cîmpeanu (Note: Romanian pronunciation: [soˈrin miˈhaj kɨmˈpe̯anu]) (born 18 April 1968) is a Romanian politician who served as Minister of Education in Ciucă Cabinet. He had previously held the same position in Ponta IV and Cîțu cabinets, and, between 5 and 17 November 2015, acted as Prime Minister of Romania, after President Klaus Iohannis accepted Prime Minister Ponta's resignation. Klaus Iohannis's appointment of Sorin Cîmpeanu was just a stopgap measure until a new candidate for the post was selected.

== Biography ==
Sorin Cîmpeanu was born in Bucharest on April 18, 1968. In 1986, he graduated from the city's Saint Sava National College, and then, in 1991, the Faculty of Land Improvements and Environmental Engineering of the University of Agronomic Sciences and Veterinary Medicine of Bucharest (USAMV). After, graduating the university, for a year, he was a design engineer at the Institute of Studies and Designs for Land Improvements.

In 1992, he started his university career, following all the stages: preparatory (1992–1995), research assistant (1995–1997), head of works (1997–2001), lecturer (2001–2006), and professor (since 2006). Since 2006, he has been a PhD supervisor. He was a vice-dean of the Faculty of Land Improvement and Environmental Engineering at the USAMV (2004–2008), later, the dean (2008–2012), and then, from March 2012 to December 2014, he became the rector of the University.

He is a member of several professional associations and organizations, including: National Administration of Land Improvements, Romanian General Association of Engineers, Romanian Foundation for Rural Development, National Society for Soil Science, National Association of University Managers, National Committee for Drought Control, Land Desertification and Degradation, Centre for Research in Rural Engineering and Environmental Protection and Centre for Research in the Field of Biotechnologies.

== Political career ==
=== As Minister of Education ===
==== First term ====
Cîmpeanu was appointed Minister of National Education in the Fourth Ponta Cabinet, on 17 December 2014. During his first mandate, Cîmpeanu initiated the controversial Emergency Ordinance that amnestied plagiarists, allowing doctors to give up the title, given that then Prime Minister, Victor Ponta, was accused of plagiarizing his doctoral thesis. Subsequently, lawmakers voted against this ordinance.

Cîmpeanu was not part of a political party at that time; he was proposed and supported on the education portfolio in the Ponta government by the Conservative Party leader Daniel Constantin. He is the suspended rector of the University of Agronomy in Bucharest and suspended president of the National Council of Rectors.

==== Second and third terms ====
This time as a member of the National Liberal Party (PNL), Cîmpeanu was once again appointed Minister of Education on 23 December 2020, this time in the Cîțu Cabinet. The reason given by then PNL president Ludovic Orban was that "Cîmpeanu is the guarantee of the implementation of the program România Educată (Educated Romania)", which was first announced in 2016 by President of Romania Klaus Iohannis. His appointment in the Cîțu Cabinet was criticized due to his activity in the first mandate, particularly around the legislation "that protected those found to have plagiarised their academic theses". On 25 November 2021, he was subsequently appointed for the same ministerial position in the Ciucă Cabinet, the successor of the Cîțu cabinet, for a third term.

Nonetheless, his second and third terms were both marked by the COVID-19 pandemic, which had a significant impact on education. The pandemic led to nationwide school closures that had been in effect in Romania since 11 March 2020, with the exception of a period between 14 September and 8 November, during which schools were open fully or to some extent in localities where the incidence rate was below 3/1,000 inhabitants. The measure of school closures and transition to online learning was never implemented nationwide again after the reopening of schools on 8 February 2021, with physical presence being considered the most important objective.

In 2022, Cîmpeanu initiated several reforms, starting with the structure of the Romanian academic year, such as moving the first day of school to the first Monday of September and switching from two semesters to five so-called "modules", later continuing with new education laws. The reforms received significant criticism, resulting even in a petition demanding "the firing of Cîmpeanu and withdrawal of the education laws", considering the laws "a new impulse given [to] [...] the industry of meditations and the industry of plagiarism". Cîmpeanu himself had been accused of plagiarism. Cîmpeanu responded to the accusations by arguing they are aimed at blocking the education laws from being adopted. On 29 September 2022, he resigned as Minister of Education, under public pressure following allegations that he had plagiarized a university course he had taught.

=== As acting Prime Minister ===
After his appointment, Cîmpeanu assured investors and creditors that "Romania is and must remain a factor of stability". He also told Romanians that as balanced an economy as possible is needed in order to preserve trust in the country.

He also indicated that the interim government would continue to work on the country's 2016 budget plans, although it is not empowered to pass new laws.

== Scientific and Research Activity ==
Sorin Cîmpeanu has written over 80 scientific articles and 11 specialty books/ university manuals, participating in over 60 projects as a member of the pool of experts or expert consultant, among which in three international projects. Since 2012, Cîmpeanu is the corresponding member of the Romanian Academy of Technical Sciences, Corresponding member of the Academy of Agricultural and Forestry Sciences "Gheorghe Ionescu Șișești" and general secretary of the National Council for the Certification of Titles, Diplomas and University Certificates, and since 2013, the president of the National Council of the Rectors of Romania.

== Awards and honors ==
Sorin Cîmpeanu was awarded the title of doctor honoris causa from several Romanian universities: Gheorghe Asachi Technical University of Iași (2014), University of Agronomic Sciences and Veterinary Medicine of Bucharest (2015), University of Craiova (2017), the Nicolae Bălcescu Land Forces Academy (2018), Ovidius University from Constanța (2018), the Bucharest Academy of Economic Studies (2018), and the University of Agricultural Sciences and Veterinary Medicine of Cluj-Napoca (2018).

In 2002, he was honored with the "In Hoc Signo Vinces" award for his research activity by the National Council of Scientific Research in Higher Education, in 2004 he received the Medal "Merit for Education" awarded by the Presidency of Romania, and in 2013, he received the distinction "Personality of the Year for a European Romania", granted by the EUROLINK - The House of Europe Foundation.

== Notes ==
Political offices
Preceded by Victor Ponta	Prime Minister of Romania; Acting; 2015	Succeeded by Dacian Cioloș
