= Paul Dobrescu =

Romanian academic (born 1946)

- Born: June 21, 1946 (age 80); Chiojdu
- Citizenship: Romania
- Occupations: Journalist and professor

Academic background
- Education: University of Bucharest
- Thesis: (1981)

Academic work
- Discipline: Communication
- Institutions: National School of Political and Administrative Studies
- Notable students: Alina Bârgăoanu

Paul Dobrescu is professor and founder of the Faculty of Communication and Public Relations of the National School of Political and Administrative Studies in Bucharest. He was also rector of this university from 2008 to 2012.

== Academic career and achievements ==
Dobrescu graduated in philosophy from the University of Bucharest in 1970, and obtained his doctorate from the same university in 1981. Before the Romanian Revolution of 1989, Dobrescu was assistant editor-in-chief of Era Socialista, theoretical and socio-political journal of the Central Committee of the Romanian Communist Party and taught at the Ștefan Gheorghiu Academy. In 1990 he founded the Faculty of Communication and Public Relations of the National School of Political and Administrative Studies, and was its dean until 2004. In 1997 he became full professor and in 2008 he became habilitated to supervise doctoral research. He was also rector of this university from 2008 to 2012. In 2009 he founded a publishing house called Comunicare.ro. Throughout his academic career, he also published numerous books and articles. He was also visiting professor at Ilmenau University of Technology in Germany. He was a member of the Romanian National Council for Ethics that on 18 July 2012 acquitted Romanian premier Victor Ponta of accusations of plagiarism in his doctoral thesis, and became the chairman of this council a few days after. He is currently director of the Research Centre in Communication of his faculty. He was also from 2016 to 2019 research coordinator of a 3.5-million-euro project entitled 'State of the Nation. Designing an innovative instrument for evidence-based policy making' coordinated by the General Secretariat of the Government (SGG) of Romania and co-funded by the European Social Fund of the European Union through the Operational Programme for Administrative Capacity.

== Selected works ==
- The Century of the Emerging World: Development with a Vengeance. Cambridge Scholars Publishing, 2017.
- The Post-Crisis Crises: A World with No Compass and No Hegemon. Cambridge Scholars Publishing, 2018.
- Development in Turbulent Times: The Many Faces of Inequality Within Europe. Springer, 2019.
