= Ligia Deca =

Romanian politician (born 1982)

Minister of Education
- In office 3 October 2022 – 23 December 2024
- Prime Minister: Nicolae Ciucă; Marcel Ciolacu
- Preceded by: Sorin Cîmpeanu
- Succeeded by: Daniel David

Personal details
- Born: December 22, 1982 (age 43) Constanța, Romania
- Party: National Liberal Party (PNL)
- Education: Maritime University of Constanța; University of Luxembourg

Ligia Deca (born 22 December 1982) is a Romanian politician from the National Liberal Party (PNL). On 3 October 2022, she was sworn in as Minister of Education in Ciucă Cabinet, after the resignation of Sorin Cîmpeanu.

== Early life and education ==
Deca was a student at the Faculty of Navigation and Naval Transport within the Maritime University of Constanța. She completed her master's studies in the field of maritime and port management at the same university.

== Early career ==
In 2008, Deca coordinated the pilot project of the Coalition for Clean Universities, project supported by the Romanian Academic Society (SAR). Up until 2010, she was the president of the European Students’ Union and represented the interests of the students of 37 countries, in discussions on tertiary education with important organizations including the European Union, the Council of Europe, the European Higher Education Area, and UNESCO.

Between 2010 and 2012, she was the leader of the secretariat of the Bologna Process, who coordinated the organization process of the Conference of Ministers of Education from the member states of the European Higher Education Area. After 2012, and until 2015, she collaborated as expert with the Executive Unit for Financing Higher Education, Research, Development and Innovation (or UEFISCDI for short). At the same time, she took lectures at the West University of Timișoara.

Deca is a political science researcher and in 2016 obtained her doctorate in the field at the University of Luxembourg. Areas of interest in which she has studied include: the process of Europeanisation, public policies in higher education and the internationalization of education. Deca followed a postdoctoral program at New Europe College of Bucharest.

== Political career ==
From 29 June 2015, Deca was State Councillor and on 23 December 2019 was named Presidential Councillor on education and research in the team of President Klaus Iohannis, coordinating the presidential project România Educată (Educated Romania).

On 3 October 2022, following the resignation of Sorin Cîmpeanu, Deca was sworn in as Minister of Education, being proposed and supported in this position by the National Liberal Party (PNL). Since 2023, she has also been a member of the United Nations High-level Panel on the Teaching Profession, co-chaired by Kersti Kaljulaid and Paula-Mae Weekes.

== Publications ==
Deca published articles in specialized journals together with Adrian Curaj, Remus Pricopie, or Alina Mungiu-Pippidi. In 2018, she was co-editor of the volume European Higher Education Area: The Impact of Past and Future Policies, Springer (ISBN 978-3319774084), together with Curaj and Pricopie.
