= Valentin Popa =

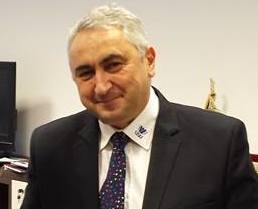
- Valentin Popa
- Born: July 12, 1964 (age 62); Corabia, Olt County, Socialist Republic of Romania
- Citizenship: Romanian
- Occupation: Professor

Academic background
- Education: Gheorghe Asachi Technical University of Iași (TUIASI)
- Thesis: Contributions to the growth of processing speed in modems (1998)

Academic work
- Discipline: Electronic and telecommunications engineer
- Institutions: Ștefan cel Mare University of Suceava (USV)

Minister of National Education
- In office 29 January 2018 – 28 September 2018
- Preceded by: Liviu Pop
- Succeeded by: Rovana Plumb (ad interim/acting)

Personal details
- Party: Social Democratic Party (PSD)
- Website: http://www.eed.usv.ro/~valentin/

Valentin Popa is a Romanian engineer, university professor, and politician. On 17 February 2012, he was elected rector of the Ștefan cel Mare University of Suceava (USV). He was also minister of education of Romania from 29 January to 28 September 2018.

== Academic career ==
Popa obtained a degree in electronic and telecommunications engineering from the Polytechnic Institute of Iași, the current Gheorghe Asachi Technical University of Iași (TUIASI), in 1989. He started his academic career as a teaching assistant in a college of this university in Suceava, which would one year later become the current Ștefan cel Mare University of Suceava (USV). He obtained a PhD from the same Polytechnic Institute of Iași in 1998, and rose through all the academic ranks in Suceava until he became full professor in 2005, and was habilitated to supervise doctoral research in 2009. On 17 February 2012 he was elected rector of the Ștefan cel Mare University of Suceava (USV).

== International profile ==
During his mandate as rector, Popa raised the international profile of Ștefan cel Mare University of Suceava (USV). On 7 July 2015, the President of Moldova, Nicolae Timofti, was awarded an honorary doctorate by this university, in the presence of the President of Romania, Klaus Iohannis. Popa was also the one who proposed Russian ambassador Valeri Kuzmin at a seminar in Suceava to strengthen scientific co-operation in order to improve tank braking systems. The polemic Moscow diplomat in Bucharest had declared that Russia had not intervened in the eastern Ukrainian region of Donbas, as proved by the fact that, when they really did intervene in Abkhazia, their tanks did not stop until they were close to the Georgian capital Tbilisi. In 2015 he sponsored the creation of the first master's degree entirely taught in English at the University of Suceava, which was also the subject of a double-degree agreement with a Spanish university.

== Political activity ==
The nominalization of Popa as minister of national education faced the initial opposition of an influential faction of the Social Democratic Party (PSD). They backed the powerful Ecaterina Andronescu, who had been active in national politics since 1996, including three times as minister of national education. Commentators of this internal conflict, that was very apparent in the Executive Committee of the party, already foresaw that the "hunt" of the new appointee, as they defined it, would continue in the media. But Popa's nomination resisted the pressures, as he had the backing not only of his party branch in Suceava, but also of 45 out of 48 Romanian rectors and, most importantly, of the then national leader of the party, Liviu Dragnea.

On 27 September 2018 he announced his resignation as minister of national education, as a result of a dispute with the Democratic Alliance of Hungarians in Romania (UDMR/RMDSZ), a confidence and supply partner of the coalition government he was part of, over whether Romanian language courses for Hungarian minority pupils should be taught by native Romanian speakers.
