= Szondi =

Szondi or Szondy is a Hungarian language surname. It may refer to:

- Gabriel Szondy (born 1951), Australian sport administrator
- György Szondy (1500–1552), Hungarian soldier
- István Szondy (1925–2017), Hungarian athlete and equestrian
- Léopold Szondi (1893–1986), Hungarian psychiatrist
- Péter Szondi (1929–1971), German literary scholar
- Sandor Szondi (1920–1997), Belgian politician

== See also ==
- Szondi test, a personality test in clinical psychology
