= University of Agronomic Sciences and Veterinary Medicine of Bucharest =

Agricultural school in Bucharest, Romania

Coordinates: 44°28′18.14″N 26°4′13.61″E

- Universitatea de Științe Agronomice și Medicină Veterinară din București
- Logo of the University
- Other name: USAMVB
- Former names: Pantelimon Institute of Agriculture (1852–1867); Central School of Agriculture and Forestry (1867–1915); Herăstrău Higher School of Agriculture (1915–1929); Academy of Higher Agronomic Studies of Bucharest (1929–1938); Faculty of Agronomy of Bucharest (1938–1948); Agronomic Institute of Bucharest (1948–1992)
- Motto: Ex Terra Aurum
- Type: Public
- Established: 1852; 174 years ago
- Rector: Sorin Mihai Cîmpeanu
- Faculty: 629
- Students: 11,941
- Undergraduates: 9,829
- Postgraduates: 1,901
- Doctoral students: 458
- Location: Bucharest, Romania
- Website: www.usamv.ro

University rankings

Regional – Overall
- QS Emerging Europe and Central Asia: 301-350 (2022)

The University of Agronomic Sciences and Veterinary Medicine of Bucharest (Romanian: Universitatea de Științe Agronomice și Medicină Veterinară din Bucuresți) is the oldest and largest institution of higher agricultural sciences and veterinary education in Romania. With around 12,000 students, the university offers 32 undergraduate programmes and 33 master programmes; all are available in Romanian, 6 in English, and 1 in French. Furthermore, there are also two doctoral schools specialised in five fields: Agronomy, Animal Science, Biotechnologies, Horticulture, and Veterinary Medicine.

== Campus ==
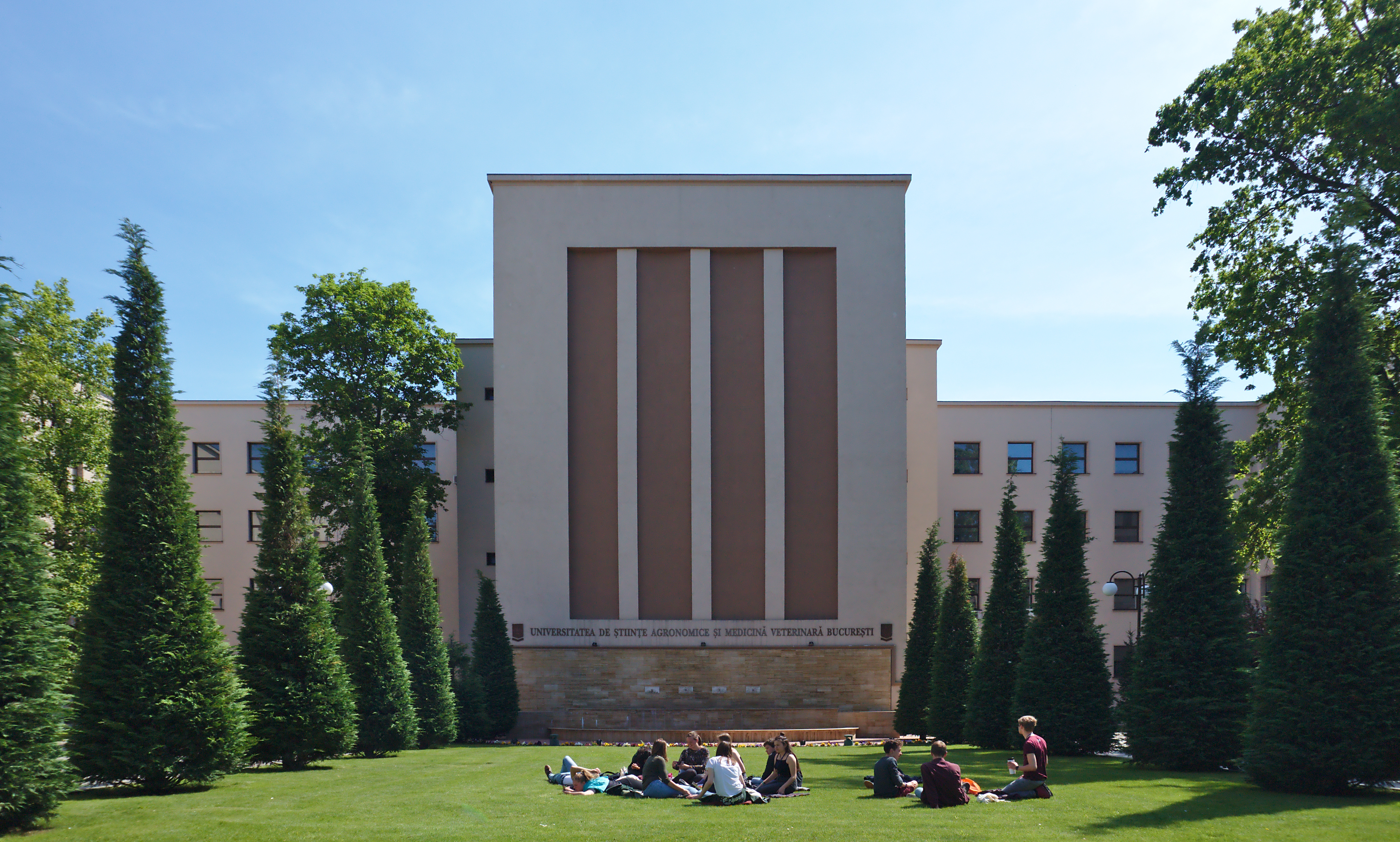
The main university building in the Herăstrău campus

The university has two campuses located in Bucharest, Romania. The Herăstrău campus, which is the main campus, was established in 1868, and is spread over an area of 38 hectares. It is located north of the city centre, adjacent to Herăstrău Park (now known as King Michael I Park), Bucharest's largest park. The main campus hosts six of the seven faculties and several of the university's facilities (such as research buildings, student residences, a botanical garden and experimental fields).

Since 1887, the Faculty of Veterinary Medicine is located at the Cotroceni campus in the centre of Bucharest, along the Dâmbovița River. This campus has an area of 5.5 ha (14 acres), and besides the Faculty of Veterinary Medicine and its related facilities, it also hosts student residences and a veterinary clinic (which is open to the general public).

== History ==
Its origin lies in a document signed in 1852 by Barbu Dimitrie Știrbei, Ruler of Wallachia (1849–1856), who founded the Institute of Agriculture in Pantelimon, near Bucharest. The Institute started its activity in 1853, being joined a few years later in 1861 by the School of Veterinary Medicine. The agronomic and veterinary education evolved towards more developed forms, interrelated to the increasing need of specialists in plant and animal breeding, with the development of specialised sciences and knowledge.

In 1867, when the curricula expanded to include forestry sciences, the school became the Central School of Agriculture and Forestry. The first experimental didactic farm in Romania was established within this institution. On 1 August 1868, King Carol I of Romania laid the foundation stone of the new campus on the Herăstrău Estate in Bucharest, and in 1869, teachers and students started their activity there. In 1887, the first agricultural research institution in Romania, named the Bucharest Agronomic Station, was established within the school and experimental land plots were established on the Herăstrău lake shore.

The first part of the 20th century saw many changes to the structure of the school. In 1915, it was renamed as the Higher School of Agriculture, and in 1921, the School of Veterinary Medicine became a faculty of the University of Bucharest. During the following years, the agronomic education developed further under several names: Higher School of Agriculture of Herăstrău (1915), Academy of Higher Agronomic Studies (1929), Faculty of Agronomy – merged within the Politehnica School of Bucharest (1938), and the Agronomic Institute of Bucharest (1948). In 1948, the Faculty of Veterinary Medicine returned to the Agronomic Institute of Bucharest, once again becoming part of the university.

In 1992, the name changed to the University of Agronomic Sciences, and in 1996 it became the University of Agronomic Sciences and Veterinary Medicine of Bucharest.

The University of Agronomic Sciences and Veterinary Medicine of Bucharest has adopted the Bologna Process and European Credit Transfer and Accumulation System (ECTS). The University currently offers programs in Romanian, English, and French in all the three cycles: cycle 1 (bachelor's degree), cycle 2 (master's degree), and cycle 3 (doctorate).

== Faculties ==
The university has seven faculties:

- Faculty of Agriculture
- Faculty of Veterinary Medicine (EAEVE Accredited)
- Faculty of Horticulture
- Faculty of Animal Production Management and Engineering
- Faculty of Land Reclamation and Environmental Engineering
- Faculty of Biotechnologies
- Faculty of Management, Economic Engineering in Agriculture, and Rural Development

== International memberships ==
The University of Agronomic Sciences and Veterinary Medicine of Bucharest has 52 ERASMUS agreements and 29 international framework agreements. It is a member in the following international associations:

- BSUN (Black Sea Universities Network)
- EUA (European University Association)
- ICA (Association for European Life Science Universities)
- EAEVE (European Association of Establishments for Veterinary Education)
- CASEE (Central and South Eastern Europe Network of ICA)
- EARMA (European Association of Research Managers and Administrators)
- DRC (Danube Rectors' Conference)
- AUF (Agence Universitaire de la Francophonie)
