= Ioan Mang =

Romanian politician (born 1958)

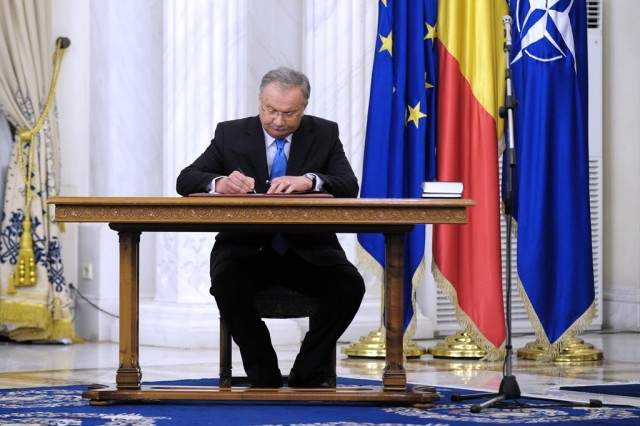
Ioan Mang

Ioan Mang (Romanian pronunciation: [iˈo̯an maŋɡ]; born July 15, 1958) is a Romanian politician and member of the Social Democratic Party. Mang served as the Education Minister in Victor Ponta's cabinet for eight days, and as a professor of Computer Science at the University of Oradea.

== Biography ==
Mang studied at the University of Timișoara and received his doctorate in engineering in 1998. He guided a department of the university there for the period from 1993 until 2000. Since March 2000 he is the rector at the University of Oradea. Since 2001 he is in the PSD (Social Democratic Party). Mang has a wife and two children.

== Academic misconduct controversy ==
On 10 May 2012, he was accused of plagiarism of many of his academic papers and resigned on 15 May due to those plagiarism allegations.

== See also ==
- List of scientific misconduct incidents
