= Adrian Curaj =

Romanian electrical engineer

Adrian Curaj (born October 14, 1958) is a u electrical engineer who was named Education Minister in the new government of Dacian Cioloș in November 2015. He was removed during a cabinet reshuffle the following July.

In 2010, Curaj became director of the Executive Agency for Higher Education, Research, Development and Innovation Funding (UEFISCDI).

He is a professor at the Politehnica University of Bucharest, where he teaches in the research management department, and directs the university's Center for Strategic Management and Quality Assurance in Higher Education.

He is also Head of The Department of UNESCO for Policies in Science and Innovation at the National University of Political Studies and Public Administration (SNSPA).

Adrian Curaj is the artisan and promoter of the "Laser Valley - Land of Lights" project, which involves the development of a smart city and a dynamic, innovative and entrepreneurial community around the ELI Nuclear Physics (ELI-NP) in Măgurele (Romania). In fact, Curaj was named in 2016 as a High Representative of the Prime Minister for the development of ecosystem based on science, innovation and entrepreneurship associated with the pan-European infrastructure of ELI-NP.

== Biography ==
In 1983, Curaj graduated from the electronics and telecommunications faculty of the Politehnica University of Bucharest.

He holds a Ph.D. in Automatic Systems from the Politehnica University of Bucharest and a Master of Business Administration from ASEBUSS Bucharest and University of Washington in Seattle. He was granted a certificate in Business Administration - Global Management Program, from the Institute of Business and Public Administration of Bucharest, in partnership with Kennesaw State University.

He was the president of the National Authority for Scientific Research, with the rank of State Secretary, in 2009-2010. He was the advisor to Prime Minister Călin Popescu-Tăriceanu in the field of Science and Innovation, during 2007-2008.

Curaj has been working as a consultant with World Bank, UNESCO, UNIDO, ETF and EC for studies in Tertiary Education, Science and Innovation, and Foresight. He has been involved as project leader or expert in many research projects, most of them in research management, higher education management and foresight, areas where he also published scientific articles and books. Two of the inventions he is co-author received gold medals at the Geneva Invention Salon 2009 and 2013.

In 2000, Curaj was awarded the National Order of Merit as Officer for contributions to the development of science and innovation. In 2009 and 2013 he won gold medals at the International Exhibition of Inventions of Geneva and in 2014 he was included by Foreign Policy Romania in the Top 100 people who move the country forward – the innovation section.
