= Journal of Evidence-Based Psychotherapies =

- Discipline: Psychotherapy
- Language: English
- Edited by: Oana A. David, Irving Kirsch

Publication details
- Former names: Journal of Cognitive and Behavioral Psychotherapies
- History: 2001–present
- Publisher: Cluj-Napoca University Press, Babeș-Bolyai University (Romania)
- Frequency: Biannually
- Open access: Yes

Standard abbreviations
- ISO 4: J. Evid.-Based Psychother.

Indexing
- ISSN: 2360-0853
- OCLC no.: 1130802268

Links
- Journal homepage; Online archive

The Journal of Evidence-Based Psychotherapies is an academic journal associated with the International Institute for the Advanced Studies of Psychotherapy and Applied Mental Health at Babeș-Bolyai University. (It is the successor of the Journal of Cognitive and Behavioral Psychotherapies (2001-2013).) The Journal's scope is the advancement of research in both clinical theory and the practice of evidence-based psychotherapies (EBP).
