= Sandor Szondi =

- Born: 25 August 1920; Budapest
- Died: 9 July 1997 (aged 76); Sint-Lambrechts-Woluwe
- Occupation: politician

Sandor Szondi (25 August 1920 – 9 July 1997) was a Flemish politician of Hungarian descent.

He grew up in a Flemish foster family and was naturalized Belgian because of his merits as a member of the resistance during the Second World War.
He studied law and chose a career at the Ministry of Transport. Due to his experiences as a civil servant in Brussels, he felt the treatment of Flemings by the French speakers was unjust. This caused him to take an initiative to improve the situation of native Dutch speakers in the capital city of Belgium. He founded the Verbond van Vlaams Overheidspersoneel, 'Union of Flemish civil servants', and the Centraal Secretariaat van Vlaamse Verenigingen, 'Central Secretariat for the Flemish Associations'. He was also an editor of several magazines and additionally made his point clear in speeches and letters he wrote to newspapers. In 1969, he founded a kindergarten for the children of native Dutch speakers in Brussels. Szondi was a municipal councillor for the CVP, Christelijke Volkspartij or 'Flemish Christian Democrat Party', in the municipality Etterbeek (in the Brussels Region). In that position, he regularly got into conflict with the French-speaking majority. Due to his merits for the Flemish movement, he received several Flemish honour awards.
After his death, the Flemish community of Etterbeek – Brussels created a Foundation, called "Private Stichting Sändor Szondi". The Foundation issues an annual award in cash to an individual, group or organization which has given proof of positive activity to the benefit of the Flemish community, living in Brussels.

== Sources ==
- This article is based on the translation of the corresponding article of the Dutch Wikipedia.
