= Liviu Pop =

Romanian politician

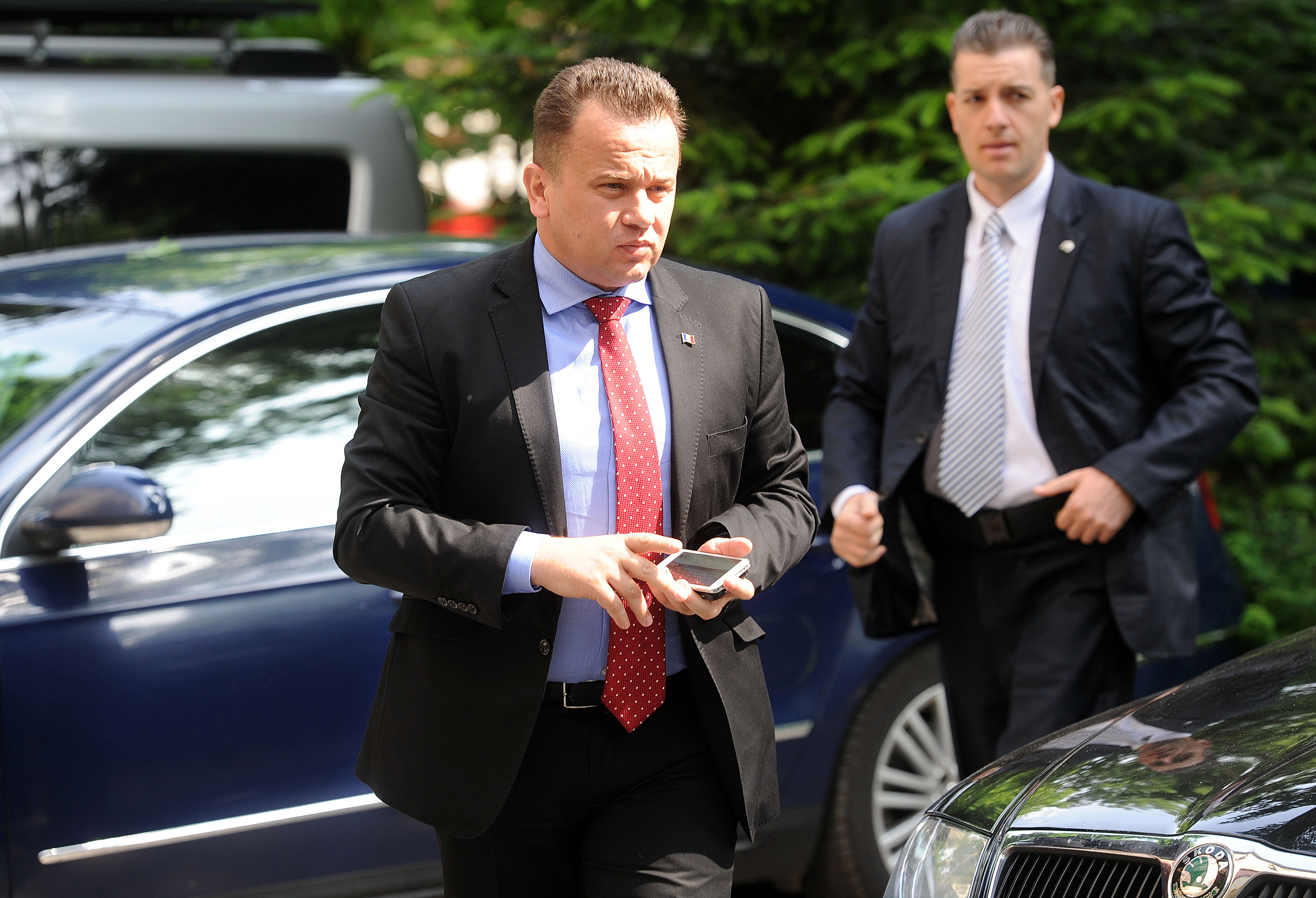

Minister of National Education
- In office 29 June 2017 – 29 January 2018
- Prime Minister: Mihai Tudose; Mihai Fifor (Acting)
- Preceded by: Pavel Năstase
- Succeeded by: Valentin Popa

Senator for Maramureș County
- In office 20 February 2017 – 21 December 2020
- In office 19 December 2012 – 19 December 2016

Personal details
- Born: 10 May 1974 (age 52) Vișeu de Sus, Socialist Republic of Romania
- Party: Social Liberal Humanist Party (since 2023); Alliance for the Homeland (2021-2023); Social Democratic Party (2012-2021); Independent (before 2012)
- Education: Babeș-Bolyai University

Liviu-Marian Pop (born 10 May 1974) is a Romanian politician. He was a very controversial Romanian interim Education Minister in the cabinet of Victor Ponta.

He played a significant role during the plagiarism controversy involving Prime Minister Victor Ponta. A committee responsible for validating academic titles analyzed Ponta's doctoral thesis and unanimously concluded that plagiarism had occurred, recommending the withdrawal of his doctoral degree. In response, interim Education Minister Liviu Pop (PSD) challenged the committee’s authority and rejected its findings, arguing that the session lacked a legal quorum. Notably, Pop had signed an order to reorganize the committee the previous day, but due to procedural timing, the order only took effect during the session in which the thesis was being reviewed. Another committee, subordinated to the Education Ministry, later found that Ponta did not commit plagiarism.

On July 27, 2016 the CNATDCU (Consiliul Național de Atestare a Titlurilor, Diplomelor și Certificatelor Universitare) — reformed by the new Education Ministry — reconfirmed the plagiarism verdict, subsequently requesting the withdrawal of Ponta's doctoral title.

Pop is also known for making very embarrassing grammar, spelling and logical mistakes, for example misspelling the word "knee" in Romanian ("genunche" instead of "genunchi"), or that "mistakes can be fixed, while errors cannot" ("greșelile se pot corecta, erorile nu"), or that "12th grade students have been in school for 17-18 years" ("[...] Vă place cum arăta școala, când ați intrat acum 18 ani sau 17 ani? Atunci ați intrat în clasa I”). In 2018 a mistake was discovered in a mathematical manual published by the Ministry of Education. It stated that the number 9 is larger than the number 12. In defense Pop (graduated from the faculty of mathematics and informatics at Babeș-Bolyai University in Cluj-Napoca) publicly argued that this could be the case in another number system, for example base 5. With basic mathematical knowledge however it can easily be proven that this is impossible.
