= Ștefan cel Mare University of Suceava =

Romanian public university

Coordinates: 47.640681°N 26.243762°E

- Universitatea „Ștefan cel Mare” din Suceava
- Type: Public
- Established: 7 March 1990; First as the Institute of Pedagogy in 1963
- Rector: Mihai Dimian (as of March 2024)
- Students: 10,174
- Location: Suceava, Suceava County, Bukovina, Romania
- Website: www.usv.ro

University rankings

Global – Overall
- QS World: 1201–1400 (2024)
- THE World: 1201–1500 (2024)

The Ștefan cel Mare University of Suceava (Romanian: Universitatea „Ștefan cel Mare” din Suceava, USV), also known as University of Suceava (Romanian: Universitatea din Suceava), is a public university in Suceava, Suceava County, Bukovina, northeastern Romania, officially founded in 1990 and initially established in 1963 as the Institute of Pedagogy (Romanian: Institutul Pedagogic).

It was named in honour of the Moldavian monarch (Romanian: Domn) Stephen the Great (Romanian: Ștefan cel Mare). It awards bachelor's degrees, master's degrees, and PhD degrees. The university is also open to international students from the European Union (EU) and/or outside of it. Thus, the Ștefan cel Mare University of Suceava (USV) can also be regarded as an international university. However, it mostly attracts students from the high schools in Suceava and across Suceava County.

The Ștefan cel Mare University of Suceava (USV) is situated on Strada Universității nr. 13 (University Street number 13) in the Areni neighbourhood from the town centre, also in the proximity of the town hall. As of 2023, it is currently ranked 16th in Romania by EduRank. According to the 2024 edition of the QS World University Rankings, the Ștefan cel Mare University of Suceava (USV) is currently ranked on a certain position between the places 1201–1400.

== History ==
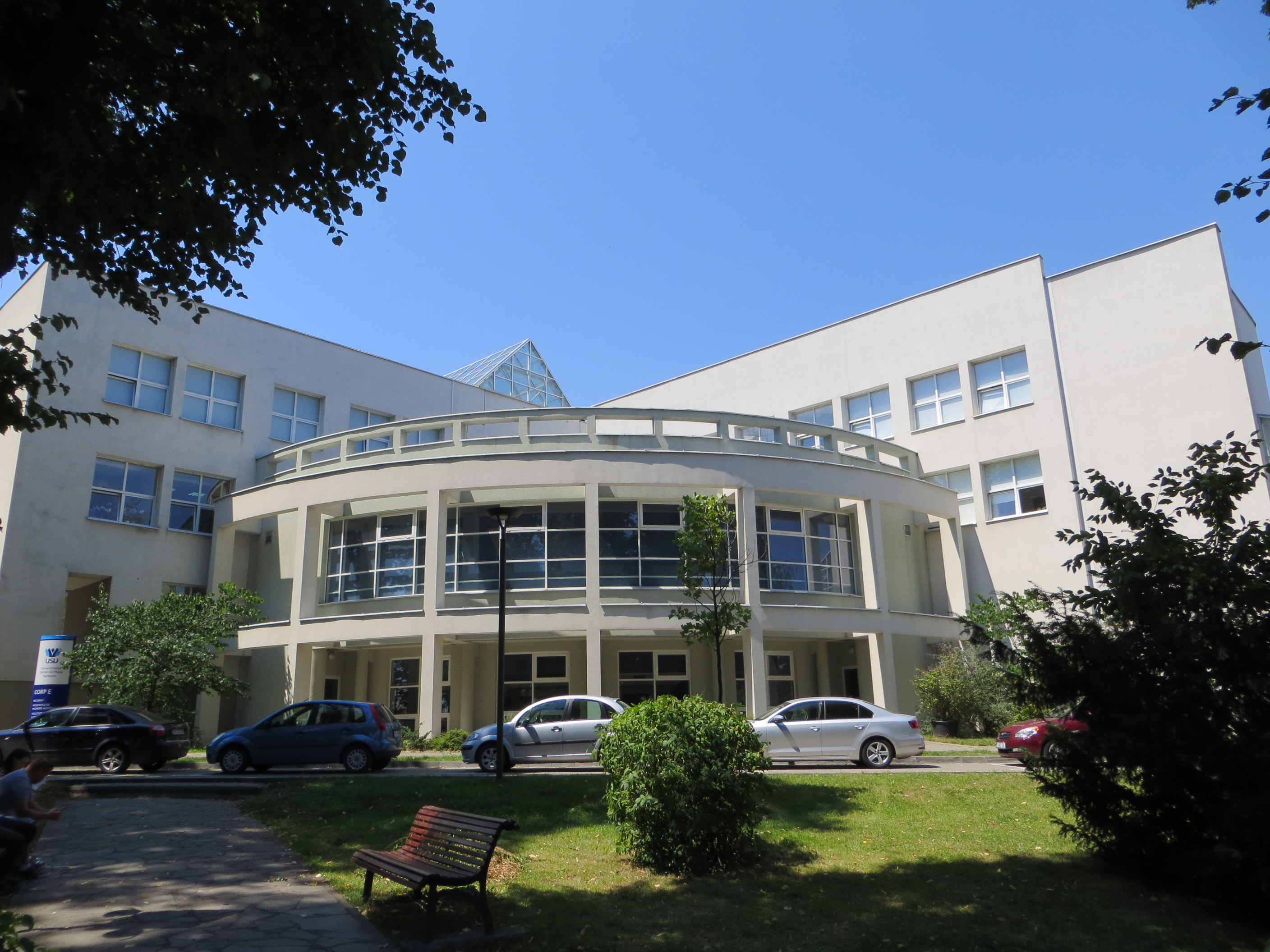
Ștefan cel Mare University of Suceava (July 2017)

Ștefan cel Mare University in Suceava (February 2023)

The first public higher education institution in Suceava was founded in 1963 as the Institute of Pedagogy. The institution had three faculties: Letters, Mathematics and Physics, and History and Geography. In 1984, it was transformed into the Sub-Engineering Institute, subordinated to the Technical University of Iași.

In 1990, after officially given the university title by the Romanian government, the institution started to individualize throughout academic consolidation, didactic and scientific diversification, not least by getting better known nationally and internationally. In September 2008, the university was awarded with a High Confidence Rating by the executive bureau of ARACIS (Romanian Agency for Quality Assurance in Higher Education). In 2009, the Ștefan cel Mare University was ranked fourth on a list created by the Kienbaum Management Consultants firm in cooperation with Capital financial magazine about the images universities have among employers.

=== Timeline ===
- 1963–1975: Higher educational phase - Institute of Pedagogy;
- 1976–1984: Joint Institute for Higher Education, Pedagogical and Technical;
- 1984–1989: Institute of Associate Engineering (part of the Gheorghe Asachi Polytechnic Institute of Iași);
  - 1985: Power Engineering was introduced to train engineers (6 years of studies and evening courses only);
  - 1986: Evening courses in Automation and Computers were held for the first time (six years of studies).
- Post–1990: "Ștefan cel Mare" University of Suceava
  - 1990: Day courses on a five-year basis were first introduced for both specializations; Automation and Electromechanics specializations were established, Engineer degree, day courses (five years) and evening courses (six years); the Electrotechnics Chair was established, which represented the forerunner of the Faculty of Electrical Engineering;
  - 1991: The Faculty of Electrical Engineering was established; the Computers and Automation Chair was established; the Engineer Diploma was awarded to the first generation of graduates in Power Engineering.

== Faculties ==
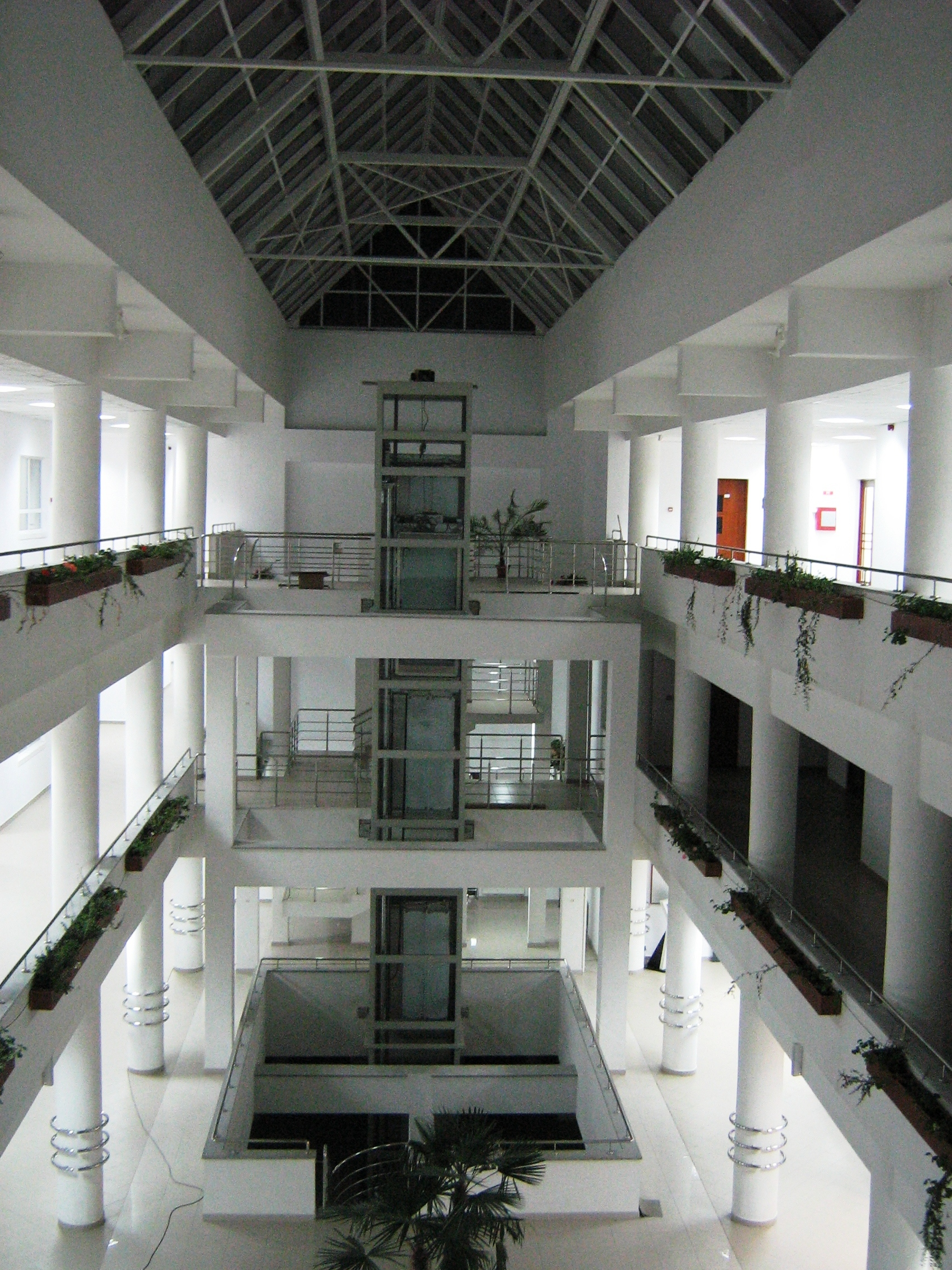
Ştefan cel Mare University in Suceava - building E (inside) in January 2008

Nowadays, the Ștefan cel Mare University (USV) has the following eleven faculties:

- Faculty of Economics and Public Administration;
- Faculty of Educational Sciences;
- Faculty of Electrical Engineering and Computer Science;
- Faculty of Food Engineering;
- Faculty of Forestry;
- Faculty of History and Geography;
- Faculty of Law and Administrative Sciences;
- Faculty of Letters and Communication Sciences;
- Faculty of Mechanical Engineering, Mechatronics and Management;
- Faculty of Medicine and Biological Sciences;
- Faculty of Physical Education and Sports.

== Facilities ==
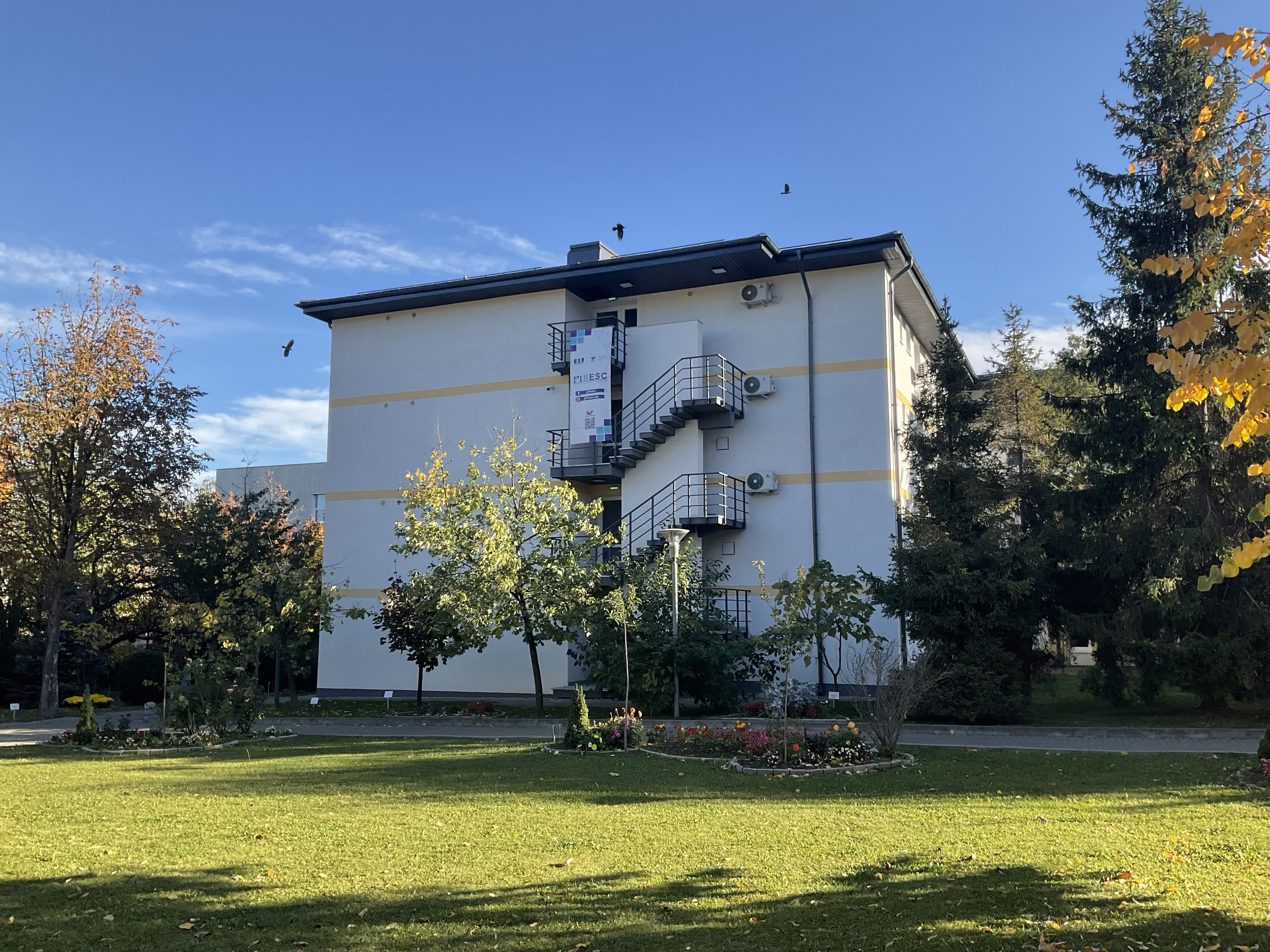
One of the student dorms within the campus of Ștefan cel Mare University (USV) in Suceava, Romania (as seen in late October 2023)

USV disposes of a noteworthy series of facilities including a student radio station (i.e. Radio USV), a student TV channel owned by Digital Media Center (DMC) with headquarters at the students' house, a large football pitch, a swimming basin, and numerous scientific laboratories equipped with the latest technology in the fields of robotics, mechanics, virtual reality (VR), and many more. Radio USV has been active since the early 2010s (more specifically from 2011 onwards) whereas Digital Media Center's student TV channel has been operating since 2018 to the present day. The student dorm buildings within the main campus have all been renovated as of late October 2023.

== International relations ==
During the academic year 2018–19, USV reported international agreements with universities in Algeria, Armenia, Azerbaijan, Bulgaria, Cameroon, China, Ivory Coast, Croatia, Czech Republic, Ecuador, France, Germany, Georgia, Hungary, Greece, Jordan, Indonesia, Israel, Italy, Japan, Kazakhstan, Kyrgyzstan, Morocco, Moldova, Poland, Portugal, Russia, Senegal, Serbia, Slovakia, South Korea, Spain, Sweden, Switzerland, Togo, Turkey, Ukraine, and United Kingdom. It is also a partner of the EUROSCI Network.

== Gallery ==
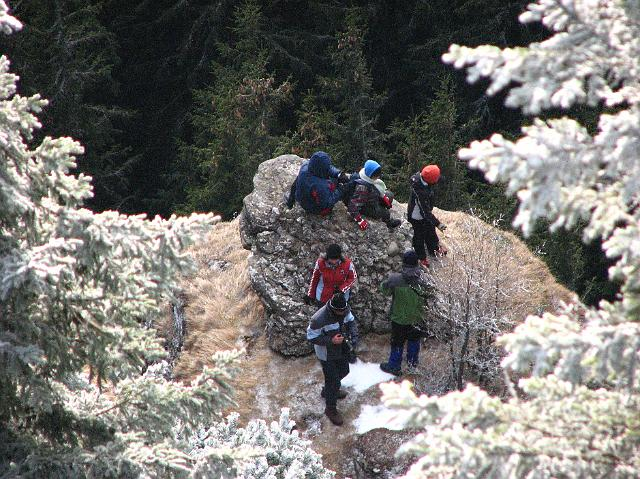
Students of the Faculty of History and Geography at practice in the mountains

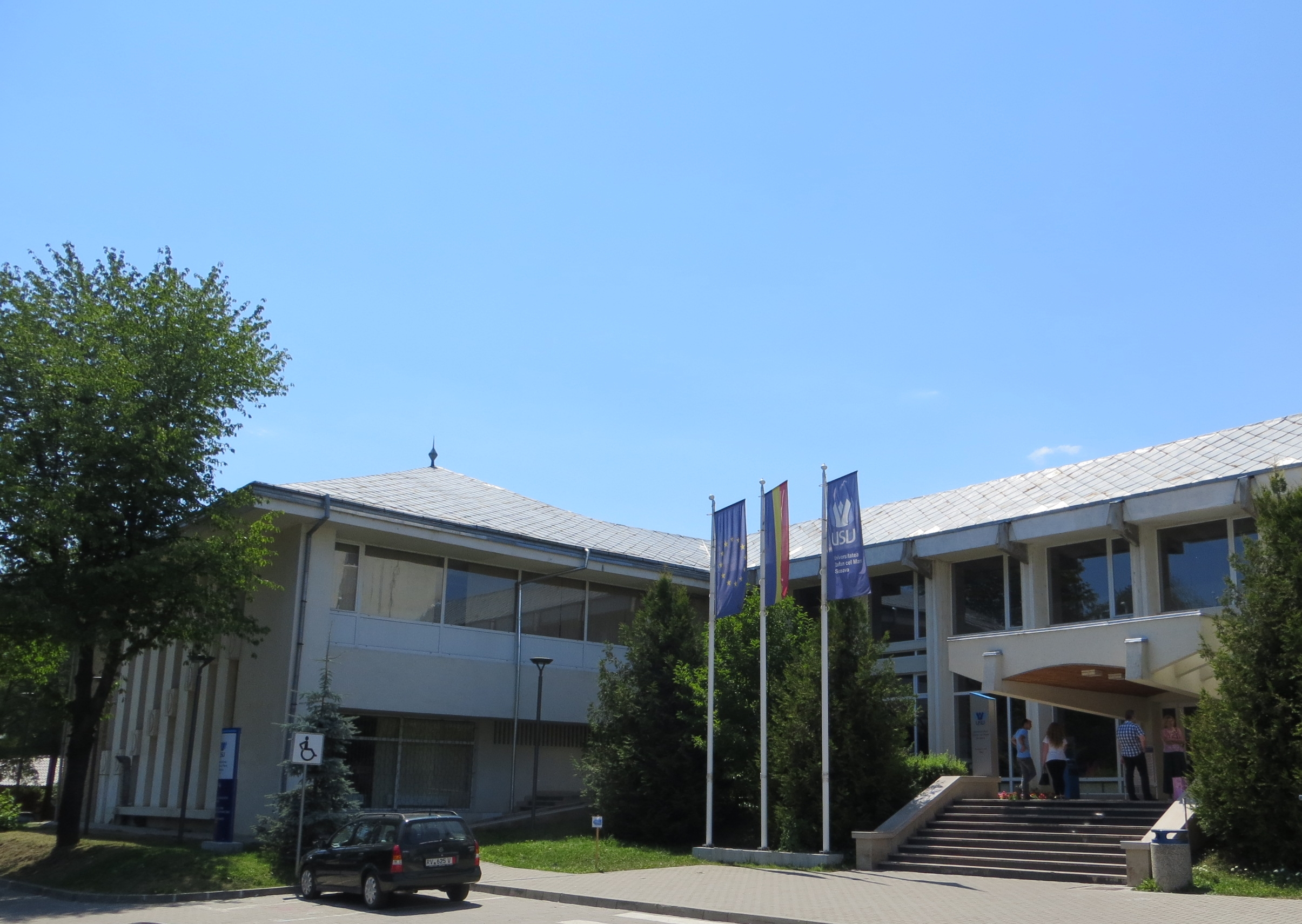
Ștefan cel Mare University of Suceava in 2017

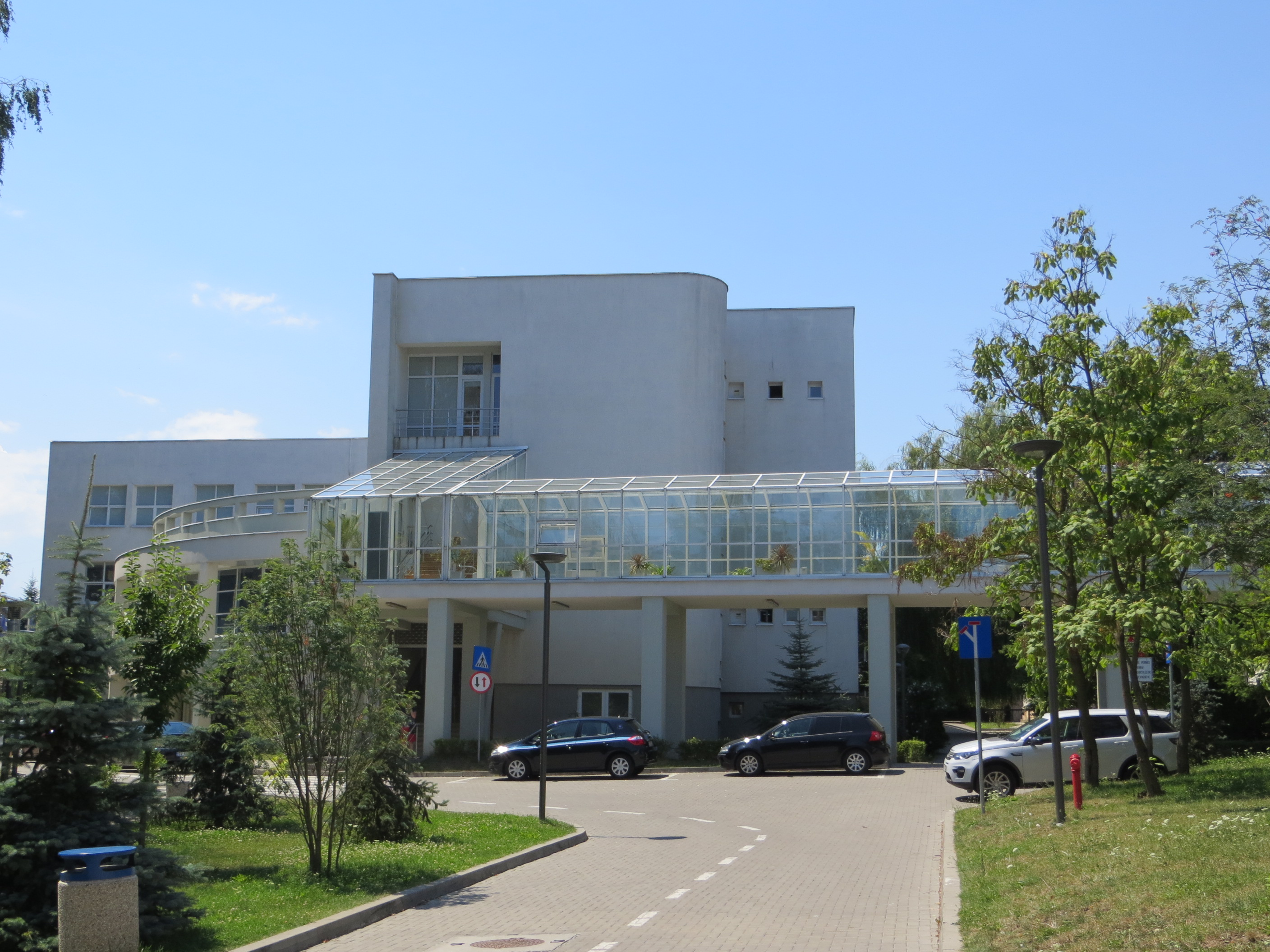
Building E of the university

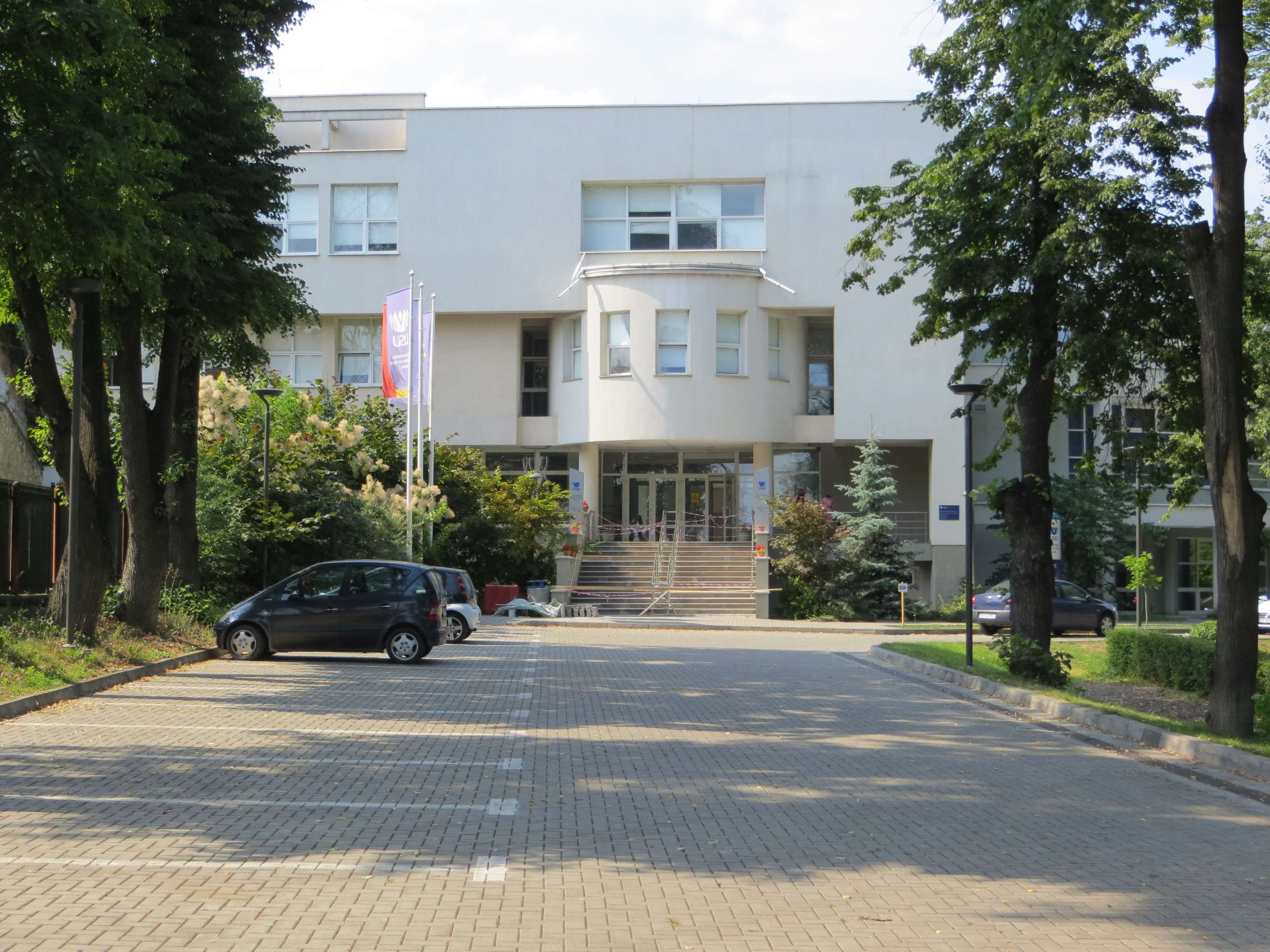
One of the entrances to building E

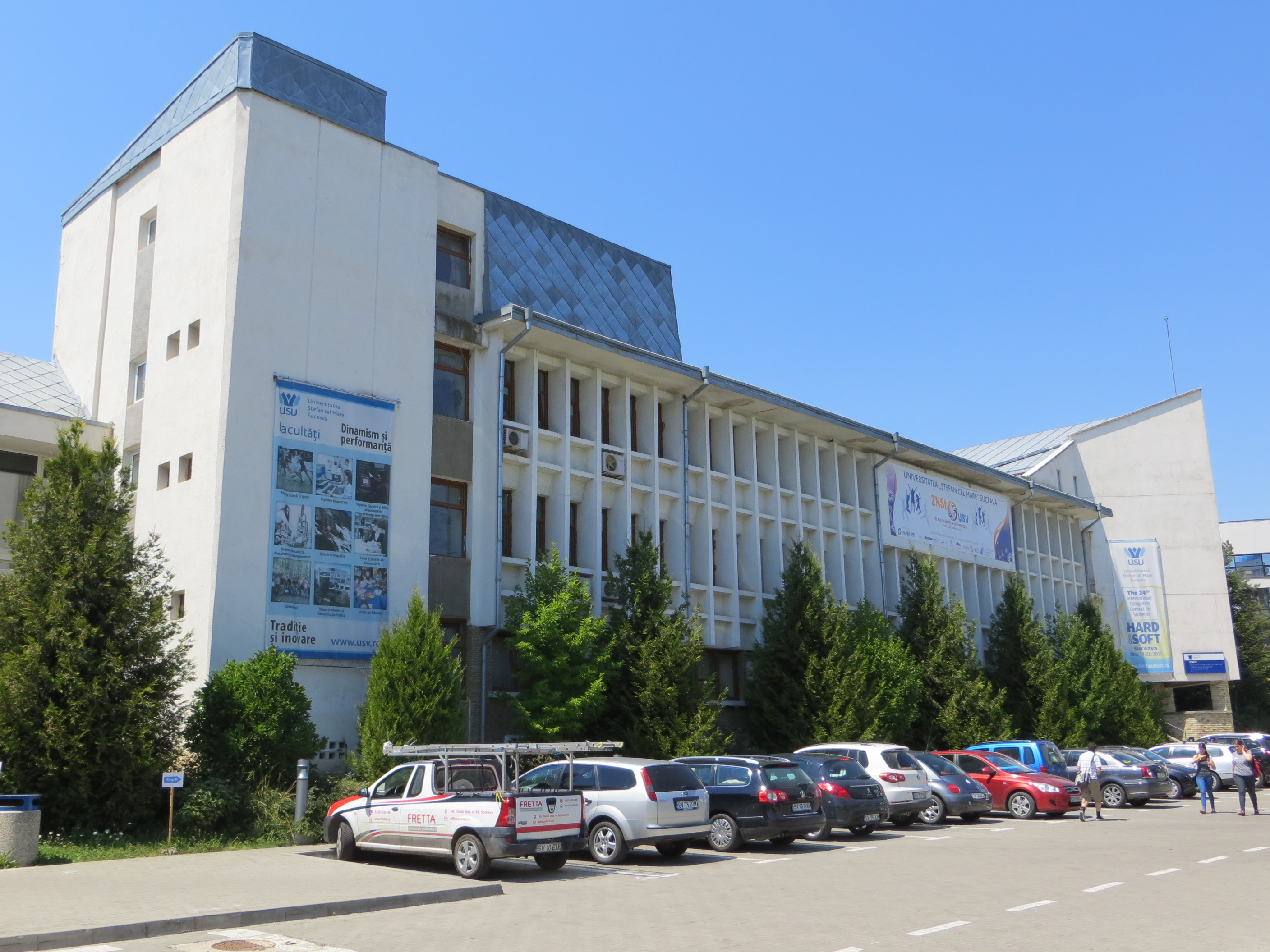
Entrance to the building near the astronomical observatory

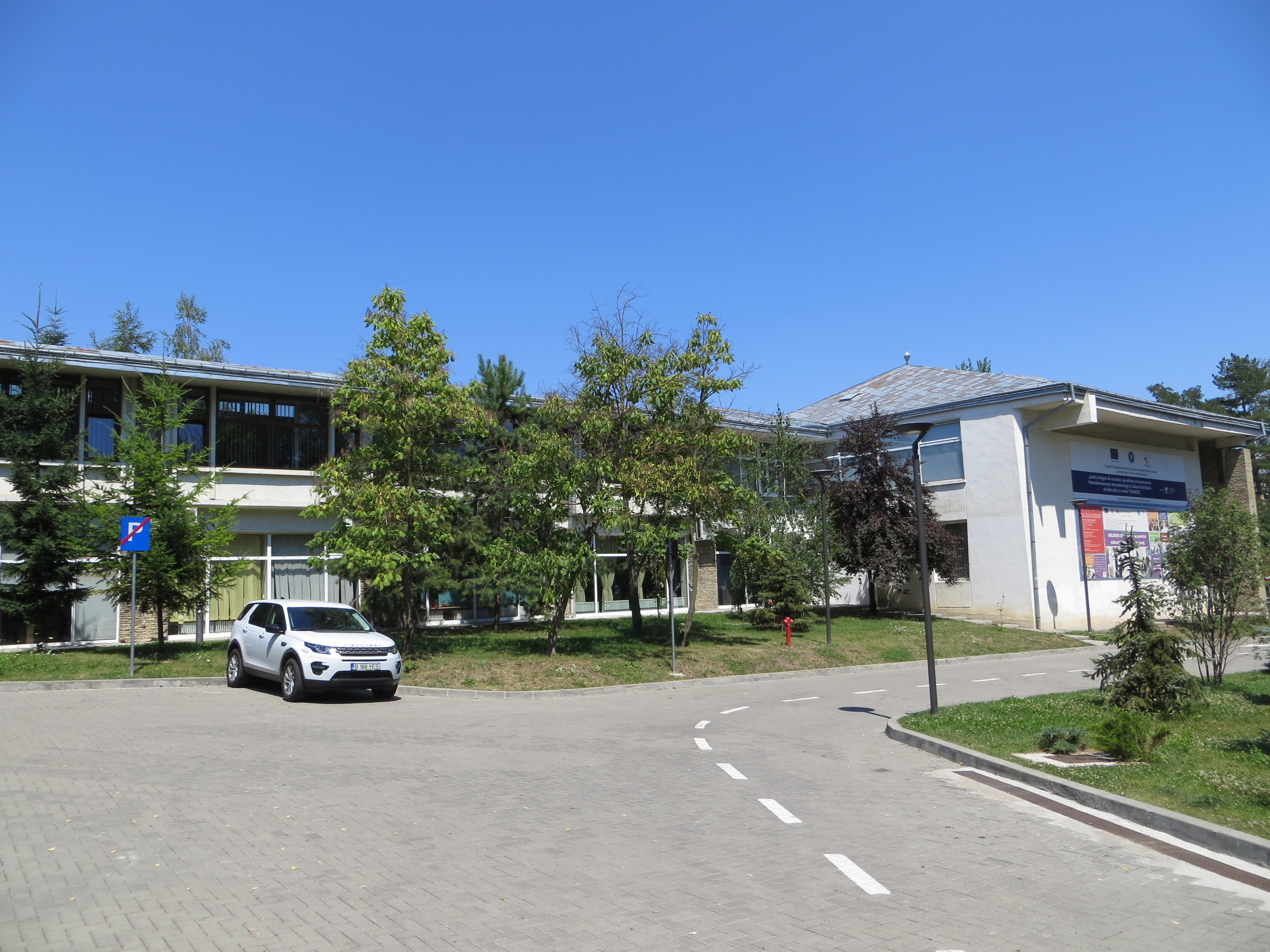
Building A of the university
