= Remus Pricopie =

Romanian education administrator (born 1970)

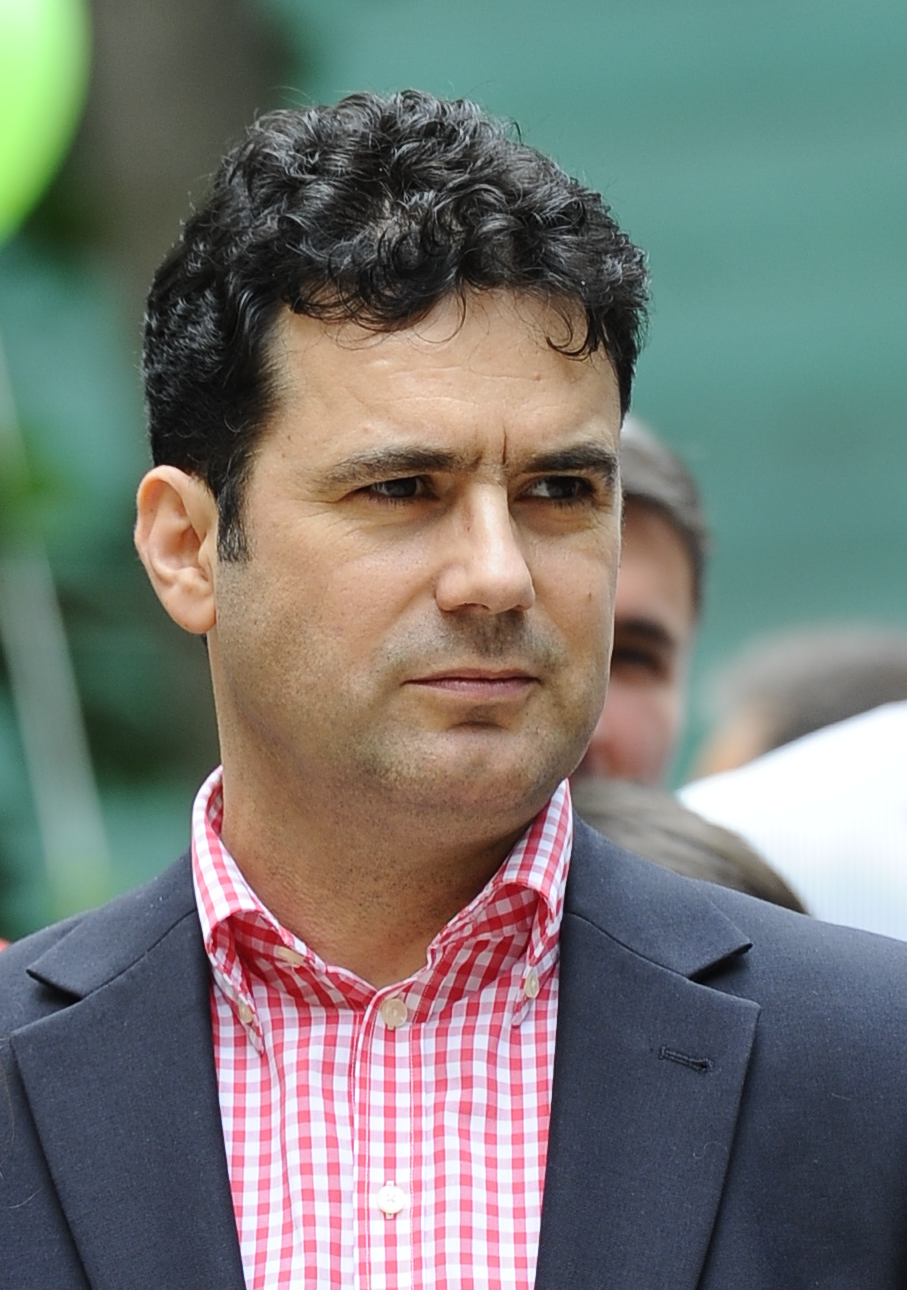
- Pricopie in 2014
- Born: February 22, 1970 (age 56); Ceahlău, Neamţ County, Romania
- Citizenship: Romania
- Occupation: Education administrator

Academic background
- Education: National School of Political and Administrative Studies

Minister of National Education
- In office December 21, 2012 – December 17, 2014
- Preceded by: Ecaterina Andronescu
- Succeeded by: Sorin Cîmpeanu

Personal details
- Party: (supported by) Social Democratic Party (PSD)
- Cabinet: Victor Ponta

Remus Pricopie (born January 22, 1970) is a Romanian education administrator. He was the Education Minister in the Victor Ponta cabinet from December 2012 to December 2014.

== Biography ==
Born in Ceahlău, Neamț County, Pricopie entered the Chemistry faculty of the University of Bucharest in 1990, graduating in 1995. He also holds a 2005 Ph.D. in Political Science, granted by that institution and by the National School of Political Science and Public Administration. He began working at the latter school in 1998, when he started teaching there and eventually became a professor. He was dean from 2005 to 2007 and from 2008 to March 2012, when he became rector. His government career, spent at the Education Ministry, began in 1996, its first phase ending in 2003. During that time, his posts included that of expert on higher education and on public relations, spokesman, secretary general and adviser to the minister. Subsequently, his positions were as state secretary for higher education (2007–2008) and adviser to the minister (2009), as well as acting minister in May 2008.

Pricopie is married and has two children. He was proposed for the cabinet by the Social Democratic Party (PSD). He left the ministry following a cabinet reshuffle.

In February 2020, in the context of dismissal the PNL government led by Ludovic Orban, PSD and PRO Romania proposed Remus Pricopie for the position of Prime Minister. Representatives of the two political parties argued the proposal, claiming that Remus Pricopie is politically independent, has experience in administration, was a very good minister, is pro-European, and pro-American.

== Academic positions ==
Remus Pricopie is Rector of the National University of Political Studies and Public Administration (SNSPA), Bucharest (March–December 2012; December 2014–present) and a Professor in the College of Communication and Public Relations (SNSPA).

He has an extensive experience as a teacher and manager in the field of education, his expertise being recognized and appreciated within professional associations and international elite organizations such as: IAU - International Association of Universities (Vice-President and Treasurer since 2017; Board Member since 2012), IAUP - International Association of University Presidents (member since 2015), Atlantis Group - 20 former ministers of education from all over the world (member since 2017), Romanian-US Fulbright Commission (President of the Board of Directors since 2015), World Academy of Art & Science (member since 2013), Romanian Association for the Club of Rome – ARCoR (member since 2002).

In April 2018, Pricopie was elected President of the Permanent Academic Forum Latin America and the Caribbean - European Union.

Remus Pricopie was responsible for the development, implementation, and evaluation of the Romanian Research Strategy (2012–2014) and also contributed to the development and implementation of EU research policies (2012–2014).
