= Romanian Baccalaureate =

School qualification in Romania

The Bacalaureat (or bac for short) is an exam held in Romania when one graduates high school (Romanian: liceu).

== Romania ==
=== History ===
The Romanian Baccalaureate has evolved over time. In 2010 they removed physical education from the subject to be chosen list.

=== Present ===
Unlike the French Baccalaureate, the Romanian one has a single degree. The subjects (except subject A) depend on the profile studied (Romanian: profil de studiu): mathematics and computer science (Romanian: matematică-informatică), philology (Romanian: filologie), natural sciences (Romanian: științe ale naturii), social sciences (Romanian: științe sociale), or various other vocational tracks (Romanian: filiera vocațională), and the candidate's choice.

The exam covers the whole high school curriculum and the marking scale is between 1 and 10. In order to pass, students must obtain at least 5.00 in every subject with a minimum of 6.00 overall. All the graduates in the country take the exam at the same time. The subjects vary from profile to profile.

== Subjects ==
The baccalaureate has up to 5 modules, each one graded separately. Module E, the written examination, is the one considered for admission to higher education.

=== Competence exams ===
A, B and D are marked with: Beginner, Average, Advanced and Experienced.

A: Romanian language - oral examination.
B: Maternal Language - if different from Romanian, and if studied; oral examination.
C: foreign language - oral and written examination; graded on the CEFR scale, from A1 to B2.
D: computer skills.

=== Written exams ===
Each exam takes three hours.

E)a): Romanian Language and Literature.
E)b): Maternal Language and Literature - if different from Romanian, and if studied.
E)c): compulsory subject (of the profile).
E)d): subject to be chosen (of the profile).

Profile	c) Subject	d) Subject
Theoretical: Sciences	Mathematics(M1)	Computer Science (C/C++ or Pascal), Physics, Biology (Botany and Zoology/ Human Anatomy and Physiology. Genetics and Ecology), or Chemistry (Organic/Inorganic)
Theoretical: Humanities	History	Geography, Logic, Psychology, Economics, Sociology, Philosophy
Technological: Technical	Mathematics(M2)	Physics, Biology (Botany and Zoology/ Human Anatomy and Physiology. Genetics and Ecology), or Chemistry (Organic/Inorganic)
Technological: Services	Mathematics(M2)	Geography, Logic, Psychology, Economics, Philosophy
Vocational: Pedagogy	Mathematics(M3)	Geography, Logic, Psychology, Economics, Philosophy
Vocational: Military	Mathematics(M1)	Computer Science (C/C++ or Pascal), Physics, Biology (Botany and Zoology/ Human Anatomy and Physiology. Genetics and Ecology), or Chemistry (Organic/Inorganic)
Vocational: Other	History	Geography, Logic, Psychology, Economics, Philosophy

M1, M2 and M3 are gradings for the amount of math classes per week.M1 means at least 4 math classes per week, M2 means three math classes per week and M3 means two math classes per week.They vary from profile to profile and specialization to specialization.
