= National University of Political Studies and Public Administration =

Public administration school in Bucharest, Romania

- Școala Națională de Studii Politice și Administrative din București (Romanian)
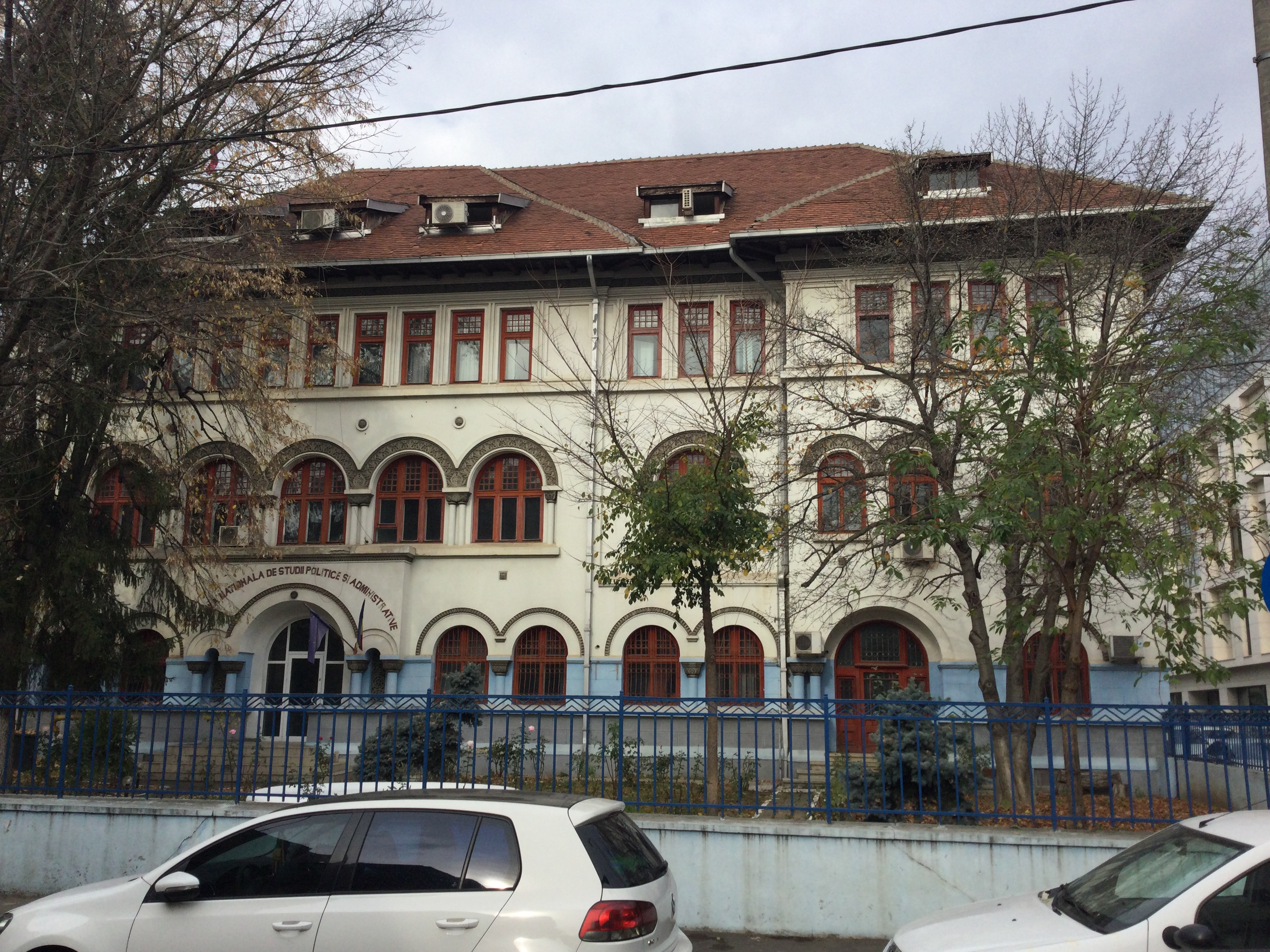
- Type: Public research
- Established: 1991
- Rector: Remus Pricopie
- Location: Bucharest, Romania; 44.449835°N 26.093988°E Building details
- Campus: Urban
- Website: snspa.ro
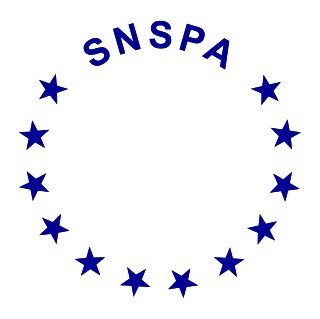

The National School of Political Science and Public Administration (Romanian: Școala Națională de Studii Politice și Administrative din București, SNSPA) is a public university in Bucharest, Romania, founded in 1991.

SNSPA is a public institution of higher education and research (University) which was established in 1991 as a postgraduate teaching institution, incorporating in its structure the former Faculty of High Political Studies of the University of Bucharest. In 1995, SNSPA obtained the right to organize undergraduate level training in political science and public administration and communication and public relations. SNSPA is currently a public institution of higher education subordinated to the Ministry of Education, Research and Innovation.

It is organised into four faculties (Public Administration, Communication and Public Relations, Political Science, Management) and one department (International Relations and European Integration).

In September 2012, the University of Sheffield and SNSPA launched a new master programme in Marketing, Advertising and PR, which offers its graduates a double diploma issued by both institutions.

In December 2012, the rector of the School, Remus Pricopie, was appointed minister of education of Romania.

SNSPA has finished in 2014 the construction of a new building started in February 2009 in the proximity of the Romexpo exhibition complex in Bucharest.

== History ==
From its origins, in practical terms, SNSPA can be considered to be a continuation of the Ștefan Gheorghiu Academy, which provided training for the leadership of the Romanian Communist Party (PCR) before the 1989 Revolution. The former party secretary from the Ștefan Gheorghiu Academy, Vasile Secăreș, created in January 1990 the School of High Political Studies. Later, in spring of that year, he founded the Faculty of High Political Studies at the University of Bucharest, which in 1991 was transformed in SNSPA. Secăreș would be the rector of the institution from its creation in 1991 to 2004.

== International relations ==
The School is an active participant in the Erasmus+ programme of the European Union, with partner universities all across Europe, the Americas, and Asia.
