= List of compositions by Jules Massenet =

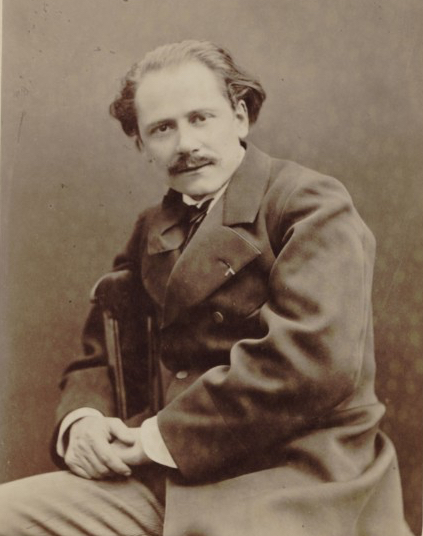
Massenet photographed by Pierre Petit, 1880

This is a list of compositions by French composer Jules Massenet (1842–1912).

== Oratorios and cantatas ==
- Louise de Mézières – 1862
- David Rizzio – 1863
- Marie-Magdeleine – 1873
- Ève – 1875
- Narcisse – 1877
- La Vierge – 1880
- Biblis – 1886
- La Terre Promise – 1900

== Ballets ==
- Le carillon – 1892
- Cigale – 1904
- Espada – 1908
- L'histoire de Manon (arr. Leighton Lucas) – 1974

== Incidental music ==
- Les Érinnyes (containing the famous Élégie) – 1873
- Un drame sous Philippe II – 1875
- La vie de bohème – 1876
- L'Hetman – 1877
- Notre-Dame de Paris – 1879
- Michel Strogoff – 1880
- Nana-Sahin – 1883
- Théodora – 1884
- Le crocodile – 1900
- Phèdre – 1900
- Le grillon du foyer – 1904
- Le manteau du roi – 1907
- Perce-Neige et les sept gnomes – 1909
- Jérusalem – 1911

== Orchestral compositions ==
- Orchestral Suite No. 1, Première suite d'orchestre – 1867
- Orchestral Suite No. 2, Scènes hongroises – 1870
- Orchestral Suite No. 3, Scènes dramatiques – 1875
- Orchestral Suite No. 4, Scènes pittoresques – 1874
- Orchestral Suite No. 5, Scènes napolitaines – 1876
- Orchestral Suite No. 6, Scènes de féerie – 1881
- Orchestral Suite No. 7, Scènes alsaciennes – 1882
- Visions (poëme symphonique pour orchestre) – 1891
- Valse très lente, for orchestra (1901)
- Brumaire (ouverture pour le drame d'Édouard Noël) (1901)
- Ouverture de concert
- Overture to Racine's Phèdre
- Sarabande espagnole

=== Concertante ===
- Fantaisie in D major for cello and orchestra – 1897
- Piano Concerto in E♭ major – 1902

== Chamber music ==
- 2 Pièces for cello and piano – 1866?
- Adagio religioso for violin and organ – 1867
- Duo for cello and double bass – 1867
- Morceaux à déchiffrer (Concours de flute 1881), Andantino for flute and piano – 1881
- Andante cantabile in B♭ major for horn and piano – 1882
- Morceaux à déchiffrer (Concours de flute 1887), Modéré for flute and piano – 1887

== Keyboard ==
=== Organ ===
- Élévation in D major – 1911
- Prélude en ut majeur – 1912

=== Piano ===
- 10 Pièces de genre Op.10 – 1866
- 7 Improvisations – 1874
- Toccata in B♭ major – 1892
- 2 Impromptus – 1896
- Valse folle in D major – 1898
- Valse très lente in C major – 1901
- Musique pour bercer les petits enfants in G major – 1902
- 2 Pièces – 1907

=== Piano 4-hands ===
- 3 Pièces (Première suite) – 1867
- 6 Danses – 1869–1870
- 2 Berceuses – 1870
- 3 Marches – 1870
- Année passée, Suite de 12 pièces – 1897

== Vocal ==
=== Song collections and cycles ===
- Poème d'Avril (Armand Silvestre), Op. 14, songs, declaimed poems and piano solos, c.1866, published 1868
- Poème pastoral (Florian and Armand Silvestre), baritone, 3 female voices, piano, 1870–72, published 1872
- Chansons des bois d'Amaranthe (M. Legrand, after Redwitz), four solo voices (SATB) and piano, 1900, published 1901

=== Mélodies (songs) ===
- À Colombine (Sérénade d’Arlequin) (Louis Gallet)
- À la trépassée (Armand Silvestre)
- À la Zuecca (Alfred de Musset)
- À Mignonne (Gustave Chouquet)
- Adieu (Complainte) (Armand Silvestre)
- Adieux (Gilbert)
- Anniversaire (Armand Silvestre)
- Aubade (Gabriel Prévost)
- Automne (Paul Collin)
- Berceuse (Gustave Chouquet)
- Bonne nuit! (Camille Distel; translated into English by Helen Tretbar)
- Ce que disent les cloches (Jean de la Vingtrie)
- C'est l'amour (Victor Hugo)
- Chant provençal (Michel Carré)
- Comme autrefois (Jeanne Dortzal)
- Crépuscule (Armand Silvestre)
- Dans l'air plein de fils de soie (Armand Silvestre)
- Déclaration (Gustave Chouquet)
- Élégie (Louis Gallet)
- Épitaphe (Armand Silvestre)
- Être aimé (Jules Massenet after Victor Hugo)
- Feux-follets d'amour (Madeleine Grain)
- Guitare (Victor Hugo)
- La Lettre (Catulle Mendès)
- La mort de la cigale (Maurice Fauré)
- La veillée du Petit Jésus (André Theuriet)
- La vie d'une rose, Op. 12 n° 3 (Jules Ruelle)
- L'air du soir emportait (Armand Silvestre)
- L'âme des oiseau (Elena Vacarescu)
- Le Poète et la fantôme (anon.)
- Le portrait d'une enfant, Op. 12 n° 4 (Pierre de Ronsard)
- Le printemps visite la Terre (Jeanne Chaffotte)
- Le sais-tu ? (Stéphan Bordèse)
- Le sentier perdu (Paul de Choudens)
- Le verger (Camille Distel)
- Les Alcyons (Joseph Antoine Autran)
- Les bois de pins (Camille Distel)
- Les enfants
- Les femmes de Magdala (Louis Gallet)
- Les mains (Noel Bazan)
- Les oiselets (Jacques Normand)
- L'esclave, Op. 12 n° 1 (Théophile Gautier)
- Lève-toi (Armand Silvestre)
- Loin de moi ta lèvre qui ment (Jean Aicard)
- Madrigal (Armand Silvestre)
- Musette (Jean-Pierre Claris de Florian)
- Narcisse à la fontaine (Paul Collin)
- Néére (Michel Carré)
- Nocturne (Jeanne Dortzal)
- Nouvelle chanson sur un vieil air (Victor Hugo)
- Nuit d'Espagne (Louis Gallet)
- Ouvre tes yeux bleus (Paul Robiquet)
- Pensée d'automne (Armand Silvestre)
- Pour qu'à l'espérance (Armand Silvestre)
- Prélude (Armand Silvestre)
- Première danse (Jacques Clary Jean Normand)
- Puisqu’elle a pris ma vie (Paul Robiquet)
- Que l'heure est donc brève (Armand Silvestre)
- Rêvons, c'est l'heure (Paul Verlaine)
- Riez-vous (Armand Silvestre)
- Rondel de la belle au bois (Julien Gruaz)
- Rose de Mai (S.Poirson)
- Roses d’Octobre (Paul Collin)
- Sérénade (Molière)
- Sérénade aux mariés, Op. 12 n° 2 (Jules Ruelle)
- Sérénade de Zanetto (François Coppée)
- Sérénade du passant (François Coppée)
- Si tu veux, mignonne (Abbé Claude Georges Boyer)
- Soir de rêve (Antonin Lugnier)
- Soleil couchant (Victor Hugo)
- Sonnet (Georges Pradel)
- Sonnet matinal (Armand Silvestre)
- Sonnet payen (Armand Silvestre)
- Souhait (Jacques Normand)
- Sous les branches (Armand Silvestre)
- Souvenez-vous, Vierge Marie ! (Georges Boyer)
- Souvenir de Venise (Alfred de Musset)
- Stances (Gilbert)
- Sur la source (Armand Silvestre)
- Un adieu (Armand Silvestre)
- Un souffle de parfums (Armand Silvestre)
- Voici que les grans lys (Armand Silvestre)
- Voix suprême (Antoinette Lafaix-Gontié)
- Vous aimerez demain (Armand Silvestre)

== Other ==
- Massenet completed and orchestrated Léo Delibes' unfinished opera Kassya
