= Lahovari House =

- Casa Lahovari
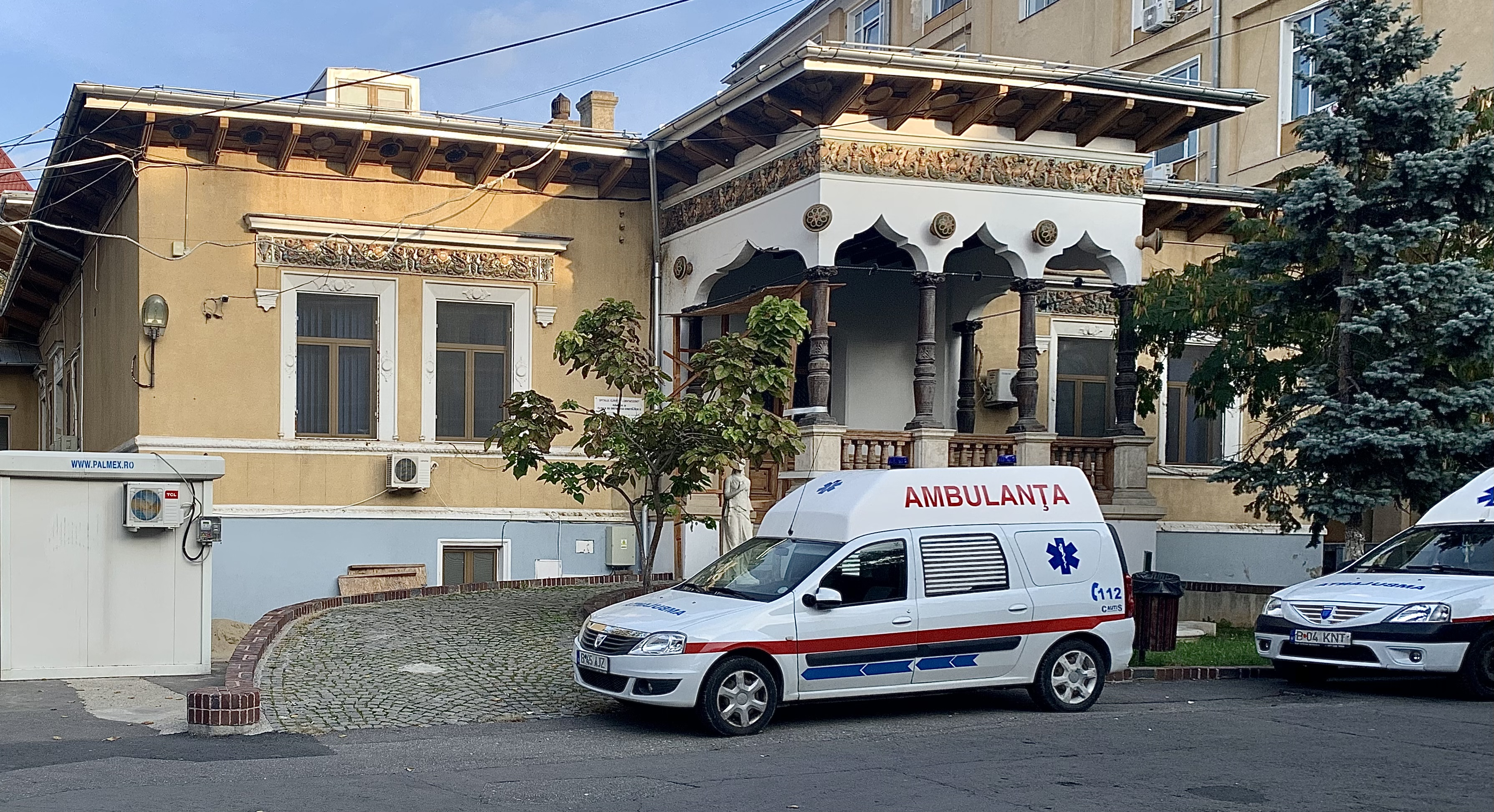
- The house in November 2020
- Location: Strada Ion Movilă 5-7, Bucharest, Romania
- Designer: Ion Mincu
- Beginning date: 1884
- Completion date: 1886
- Dedicated to: Iacob Lahovary
- Style: Romanian Revival

The Lahovari House (Romanian: Casa Lahovari) is a house in the sector 2 of Bucharest, built by Ion Mincu between 1884 and 1886, at the request of Iacob Lahovary (1846–1907), general and politician, Minister of Foreign Affairs, Minister of War and Chief of the General Staff. The building is considered to be the first significant Romanian Revival style building in the history of Romanian architecture. one of Ion Mincu's early works, it is considered to be emblematic of his style. The building was used as a home for most of its life; since 2003 it has been used by the Maternity Department of the Cantacuzino Hospital. It is classified as a historic monument.

== Description ==
Built in a style similar to another house designed by Ion Mincu, the Kiseleff Roadside Buffet, Casa Lahovari combines the elements of vernacular architecture with those of Romanian medieval architecture.

The façade of the house is asymmetrical, being well deviated and subtly dosed. The face is decorated with elements specific to popular architecture: glazed polychrome ceramics, wooden columns, similar to the columns of classical architecture, arches in the form of braces or kokoshniks. The central element of the house is supported by the side wings of the facade which have two windows joined under a common frieze (the component part of the entablature of a house).

What offers a rustic atmosphere, specific to Romanian folk houses, is the porch located above the false entrance to the basement of the house, but also a number of other elements such as: prominent and glazed buttons, the frieze made of red and green terracotta, and the wide and raised eaves. The ornamentation used by the architect to shape the facade can also be related to the architecture of houses in Italy, France, Spain, and Istanbul, places visited by Mincu, during his time as a student and after this period. Inside, the ceiling is made of stuccos that mimics wood.

For the construction of the house were used brick, plaster with lime mortar, polycrome glazed ceramics, wood, and tin.

== Today ==
The house has been preserved quite well over time, but after 1990 some interior elements were added that affect the interior aesthetics of the building. The house is currently occupied by one of the pavilions of the Cantacuzino Hospital.

== Bibliography ==
- Florian Georgescu, Paul Cernovodeanu, Alexandru Cebuc, Monumente din București, Editura Meridiane, 1966
- Alexandru Popescu, Casele și Palatele Bucureștilor, Editura Cetatea de Scaun, 2018, ISBN 978-606-537-382-2
