= Lahovary =

Lahovary family coat of arms

The Lahovary family (spelled in Romanian as Lahovari) is an old Romanian aristocratic family of Greek descent. Throughout the centuries members of this family occupied many prominent positions in the Principality of Wallachia and later in the Kingdom of Romania.

== Notable members of the family ==
- Gheorghe I. Lahovary, engineer and writer
- Iacob Lahovary, politician who was the Minister of War and Minister of Foreign Affairs of Kingdom of Romania
- Ioan Lahovary, politician who was the Minister of Foreign Affairs of Kingdom of Romania
- Alexandru Lahovary, politician who was Minister of Justice, Minister of Agriculture, Industry, Trade and Property, Minister of Public Works and Minister of Foreign Affairs of Kingdom of Romania
- Nicolae Lahovary, anthropologist and diplomat who was Minister plenipotentiary to Albania and Switzerland
- Marthe Lucie Lahovary, princess, writer and daughter of Ioan Lahovary
