= Marthe Bibesco =

Romanian writer (1886–1973)

Martha Bibescu
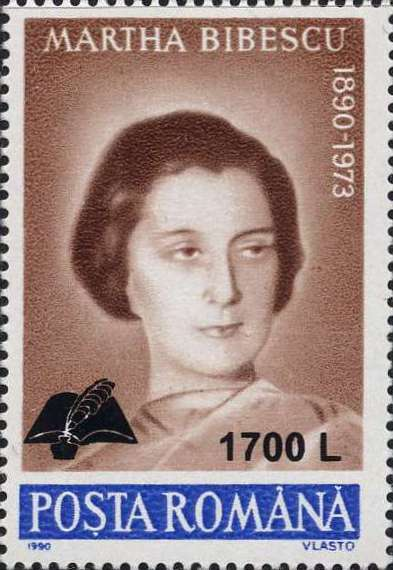
- Born: Martha Lucia Lahovary; 28 January 1886; Bucharest, Kingdom of Romania
- Died: 28 November 1973 (aged 87); Paris, France
- Occupation: Writer
- Spouse: George Valentin Bibescu (m. 1902; died 1941)
- Children: 1
- Parent(s): Ioan Lahovary; Emma Mavrocordato

Princess Martha Bibescu (Martha Lucia; née Lahovary; 28 January 1886 – 28 November 1973), also known outside of Romania as Marthe Bibesco, was a Romanian-French writer, socialite, known for her literary work and social involvement in political circles. She spent her childhood at the noble Lahovary's estates in Balotești and Biarritz, where she received an education in literature. Throughout her life, she travelled extensively across Europe, meeting notable political figures of her time. After World War I, she rebuilt her family's estates, but later lived in exile following the establishment of communist rule in Romania after World War II.

She began her literary career in 1908 with the publication of her travel memoir Les Huit Paradis ("The Eight Paradises"), which received positive reviews from French critics. One of her notable works is the novel Isvor, pays des saules ("Isvor, Land of Willows"). Writing under the pseudonym Lucile Décaux, she authored several romance novels, and contributed articles to various magazines under her own name.

== Early life ==
Born Marta Lucia Lahovary (also spelled Lahovari) in Bucharest as the third child of nobleman Ioan Lahovary and Princess Emma Mavrocordato, both members of Phanariote Greek families (Lahovary & Mavrokordatos). Marthe spent her childhood at the Lahovary family estates in Balotești and the fashionable French sea-resort of Biarritz.

On her first introduction into society, in 1900, she met Crown Prince Ferdinand, the heir apparent to the Romanian throne, but after a secret engagement of one year, Marthe married Prince George III Valentin Bibescu (Bibesco) at sixteen, scion of one of the country's prestigious aristocratic families Bibescu. "I stepped onto the European stage through the grand door", she wrote on her wedding day. Her father, who had been educated in France, held the post of minister of the Kingdom of Romania in Paris and, later, that of minister of foreign affairs of Romania.

Fluent in French at an early age, even before she could speak Romanian, Marthe spent the first years of her marriage under the tutelage of her mother-in-law, Princess Valentine Bibesco (née countess Riquet de Caraman-Chimay), who saw to it that the extensive education in European history and literature Marthe already had was reinforced. An old peasant woman, Baba Uța (Outza), saw to it that she was also well-versed in Romanian folk traditions and tales. Meanwhile, her husband, George, was interested in fast cars and other women, but adding to the family fortune at the same time.

== Before World War I ==
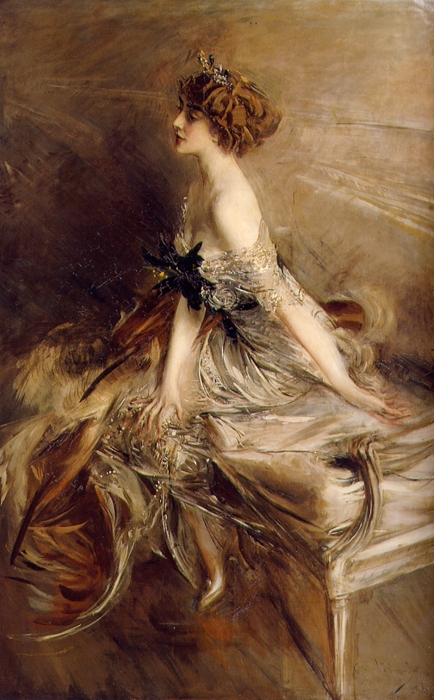
Painting of Marthe Bibesco (1911), by Giovanni Boldini

Despite her wide circle of friends, and the birth of her daughter Valentine in 1903, Marthe was bored. In 1905, when George was sent by the Romanian king Carol I on a diplomatic mission to Mozzafar-al-Din, Shah of Iran, she eagerly embarked on the trip, recording her observations in a journal. Along the way, she stopped at Yalta, where she encountered the exiled Russian writer Maxim Gorki. It was in 1908, at the suggestion of Maurice Barrès, that Marthe completed and published her impressions of her Persian trip. The French critics and writers were enthusiastic and extremely complimentary. The travel memoirs, Les Huit Paradis ("The Eight Paradises"), launched her on a lifelong career as a successful writer of both nonfiction and novels. She was well received in literary circles in Paris during the Belle Époque, moving easily among the literary, aristocratic and political power elites. She was awarded the Prix de l'Académie française and met Marcel Proust, who sent her a letter praising her book: "You are not only a splendid writer, Princess, but a sculptor of words, a musician, a purveyor of scents, a poet".

Back in Bucharest, in 1908, Marthe was introduced to the German Kronprinz, Wilhelm. Wilhelm (who, despite Marthe's references to him as "the III", was never to succeed Wilhelm II) was married, but he nevertheless wrote warmly affectionate letters to Marthe for the following fifteen years. She and her husband were invited to Germany, in the autumn of the same year, as Wilhelm's personal guests, visiting Berlin, Potsdam, Weimar, and taking part in the imperial regatta at Kiel. She accompanied Wilhelm in the imperial limousine, as it passed through the Brandenburg Gate, a role typically reserved for members of the imperial family. He would also try to involve Marthe in the international relations of pre-war Europe, secretly asking her to be the quiet mediator between France and Germany on the Alsace-Lorraine issue.

Divorce was often stigmatized among the European nobility, while extramarital relationships were more socially tolerated. While Marthe and George continued in what was sometimes a mutually supportive partnership, they pursued their own interests. The French prince Charles-Louis de Beauvau-Craon fell in love with Marthe, leading to an affair that lasted for a decade. In Paris, she also encountered the Roman Catholic Abbé Mugnier, who converted her from her Eastern Orthodox faith, and she began an extensive, frank correspondence with him that was to last 36 years.

Following several personal challenges, Marthe withdrew to Algeria, then part of the French colonial Empire, to stay with an aunt of her husband, Jeanne Bibesco, thinking about divorcing George and espousing the prince de Beauvau-Craon. Still, she felt she could not do it; George would prove to be surprisingly generous and understanding, giving her the Mogoșoaia Palace (Mogosoëa in certain French renderings) in 1912.

A couple of months before World War I, Marthe visited Spain, following the footsteps of Chateaubriand, her favourite French writer. In May, she was back in her country to greet Russian Emperor Nicholas II and his family, who were visiting the country after being invited by Princess Marie, wife of Prince Ferdinand.

== Literary career ==
In March 1915, Marthe met Christopher Thomson, the British military attaché, at a Palace soirée; he was arranging for Romania to join the Allies, although he did not agree with the policy, as Romania was unprepared for war. He remained devoted to her for the rest of his life. They corresponded regularly, and she dedicated four books to "C.B.T." Later he was a Labour peer, and Secretary of State for Air. She visited the site of his death in the R101 airship accident in December 1930 with their mutual friend the Abbé Mugnier.

When Romania at last entered the war on the Allied side in 1916, Marthe worked at a hospital in Bucharest until the German army burned down her home in Posada (near Comarnic) in the Transylvanian Alps. She fled the country to join her mother and daughter in Geneva after a quarantine exile, imposed by the German occupiers, in Austria-Hungary (as a guest of the princely family of Thurn und Taxis at Latchen). There she continued to write. For most of her life, she wrote every morning until lunchtime – her journals alone fill 65 volumes.

In Switzerland, she began work on Isvor, pays des saules ("Isvor, Land of Willows"). Her book explored themes of Romanian life, including folk beliefs and traditions."

Tragedy didn't spare Marthe, as her younger sister and her mother would commit suicide in 1918 and 1920 respectively.

For the Bibescos life after the war was more cosmopolitan than limited to Romania. Among her literary friends and acquaintances, Marthe counted Jean Cocteau, Paul Valéry, Rainer Maria Rilke, François Mauriac, Max Jacob, and Francis Jammes. In 1919, Marthe was invited to Prince Antoine Bibesco's wedding in London to Elizabeth Asquith. Princess Elizabeth Bibesco, who died in Romania during World War II, is buried in the Bibesco family vault on the grounds of Mogoșoaia. Marthe for many years occupied an apartment in Prince Antoine's Quai Bourbon house at which she held literary and political salons.

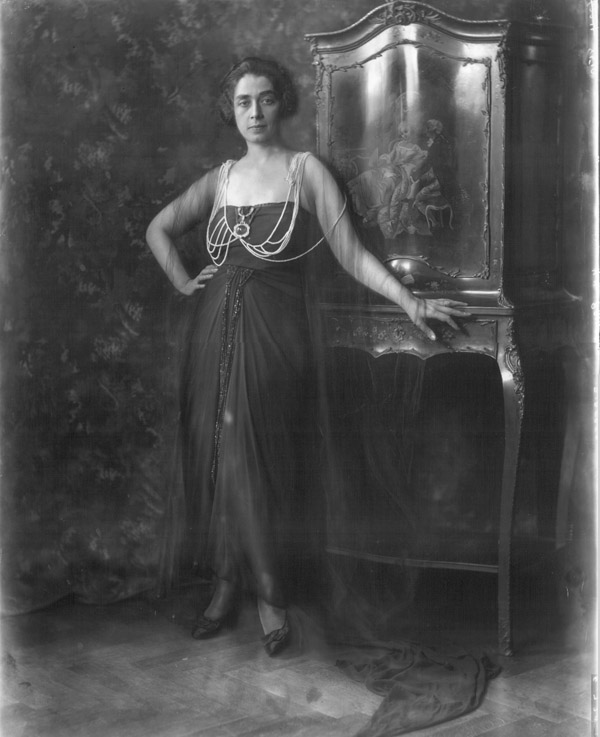
Princess Martha Bibescu, née Martha Lucia Lahovary (1886–1973), photographed in London, 9 July 1920

During this postwar period she rebuilt Posada, her mountain home, and began restoring the other family estate, Mogoșoaia, a palace built in Byzantine style. Again in London, she met Winston Churchill in 1920, starting a warm friendship that would last until his death in 1965. When her daughter Valentine married the Romanian prince Dimitrie Ghika-Comănești (24 November 1925) in a dazzling traditional ceremony, three Queens attended, (Queen-mother Sophia of Greece, Princess Consort Aspasia Manos of Greece and Queen Marie of Yugoslavia).

Moving around Europe, acclaimed as she wrote new books – Le Perroquet Vert (1923), Catherine-Paris (1927), Au bal avec Marcel Proust (1928) – Marthe gravitated toward political power more than anything else. Without forgetting the former Kronprinz, Marthe had a short love affair with Alfonso XIII of Spain, and another with the French Socialist representative Henry de Jouvenel. In the latter case, the class differences shattered their relationship, something that Marthe used as the basis of her novel Égalité ("Equality", 1936). The Prime Minister of the United Kingdom, Ramsay MacDonald, found her fascinating. She visited him often in London and was his guest at Chequers. He wrote many touching, tender letters to her. Their close friendship ended only with his death.

Accompanying George, who was by then interested in fast planes – in addition to his numerous mistresses – Marthe flew everywhere: the United Kingdom (she counted among her friends the Duke of Devonshire Edward Cavendish, the Duke of Sutherland George, Vita Sackville-West, Philip Sassoon, Enid Bagnold, Violet Trefusis, Lady Leslie and Rothschild family members), Belgium, Italy (where she met Benito Mussolini in 1936), the Italian colony of Tripolitania (Libya), Istanbul, the United States (in 1934, as guests of Franklin D. Roosevelt and his wife Eleanor), Dubrovnik, Belgrade and Athens.

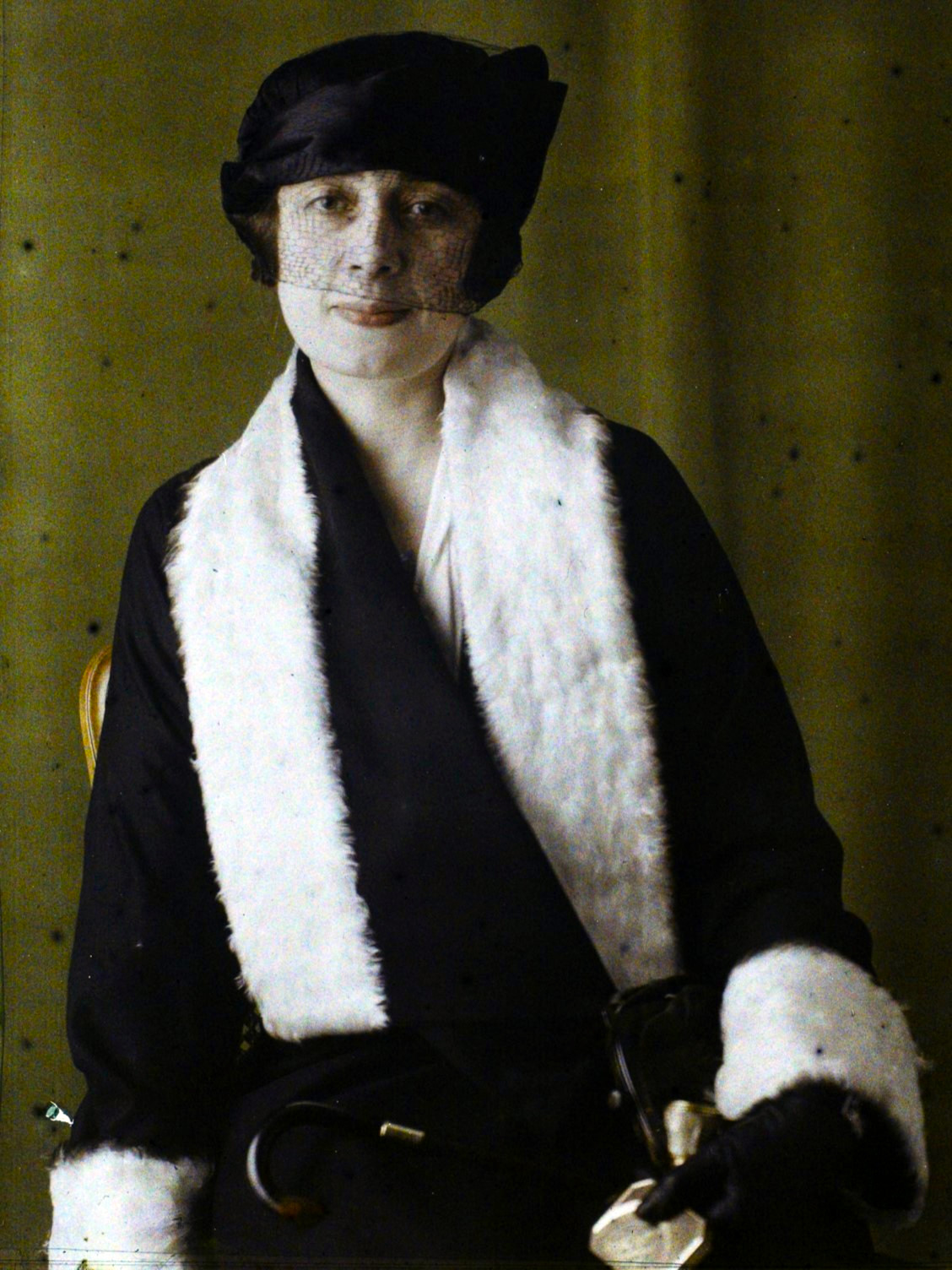
Autochrome by Georges Chevalier, 1924

Her works were both critically and commercially successful during her lifetime. Since she invested in lavish restoration projects at Mogoșoaia Palace, she began writing popular romances under the pseudonym Lucile Décaux, and articles for fashion magazines under her own name. She had a long-term contract with The Saturday Evening Post and Paris-Soir. In the 1920s and the 1930s, Mogoșoaia Palace was to become the second League of Nations, as the French Minister of Foreign Affairs, Louis Barthou, put it. There, annually, Marthe hosted royalty (among others, Gustav V of Sweden and the Queen of Greece), aristocracy (princes Faucigny-Lucinge, Princes de Ligne), the Churchills, the Cahen d'Anvers, politicians and ministers, diplomats and writers (Paul Morand, Antoine de Saint-Exupéry).

As tensions increased in Europe before World War II, the princess began to prepare. She visited Germany in 1938 to see Wilhelm, and was introduced to Hermann Göring; she visited the United Kingdom in 1939 to meet George Bernard Shaw. Her older grandson, John-Nicholas Ghika-Comănești, was sent to school in England in the same year (he was not to see his homeland again for 56 years). Romania entered the war in 1941, this time on the losing side of the Axis.

Prince George III Bibesco died on 2 June 1941; their relationship strengthened during his illness, even though he kept his mistresses. After visiting German-occupied Paris and Venice, she made a discreet diplomatic visit to Turkey in 1943 together with her cousin, Prince Barbu II Știrbey (Barbo Stirbey), trying to negotiate Romania's withdrawal from the Second World War. When the Red Army invaded her country, Marthe had a passport and connections enabling her to leave on 7 September 1945. It was not Marthe but her cousin Antoine Bibesco's wife Elizabeth who was the last Bibesco to be buried on the grounds of Mogoșoaia after her death on 7 April 1945. Neither Marthe nor Antoine would ever return to Romania. When the communist government took power in 1948, it confiscated all Bibesco property. She spent the remainder of her life in Paris and England.

== Exile ==
Eventually, Valentine and her husband were released from Romanian detention in 1958, and allowed passage to Britain, where Marthe, now supporting herself primarily through writing, bought them a home, the Tullimaar residence at Perranarworthal in Cornwall. She remained in Paris, first living at the Ritz Hotel (1946–1948), then in her apartment at 45, Quai de Bourbon. In 1955, she was appointed a member of the Belgian Academy of French Language and Literature, on the seat previously held by the canadian Édouard Montpetit. Marthe cherished the 1962 award of the Légion d'honneur. It was in 1960 that her novel (27 years-in-the-making), La Nymphe Europe, which was really her autobiography, was published by Plon.

In her later years, she enjoyed her last great friendship with a powerful leader, Charles de Gaulle, who invited her in 1963 to an Élysée Palace reception in the honour of the Swedish Sovereigns. De Gaulle also took a copy of Isvor, Pays des Saules with him when he visited Romania in 1968, and told her the same year: "... you do personify Europe to me". Marthe was then 82 years old. She died on 28 November 1973 in Paris.

In a 2001 poll conducted in Romania, she was voted among the most influential women in the country’s history.

== Archives ==
Over 350 boxes of Marthe Bibesco's personal papers including manuscripts, correspondence, and photographs are preserved at the Harry Ransom Center at the University of Texas at Austin. In addition, Marthe Bibesco's correspondence with the Romanian diplomat George I. Duca between 1925 and 1973 is preserved in the George I. Duca Papers collection in the Hoover Institution Archives at Stanford University.

== Bibliography ==
- Diesbach, Ghislain de (1986) Princesse Bibesco – la dernière orchidée, ed. Perrin, Paris, 1986
- Eliade, Mircea (1986) "Marthe Bibesco and the Meeting of Eastern and Western Literature" in Symbolism, the Sacred and the Arts. New York: Crossroad Publishing Company ISBN 0-8245-0723-1
- Sutherland, Christine (1996) Enchantress: Marthe Bibesco and her World. New York: Farrar, Straus & Giroux
