= Ève (Massenet) =

Oratorio in four parts by Jules Massenet

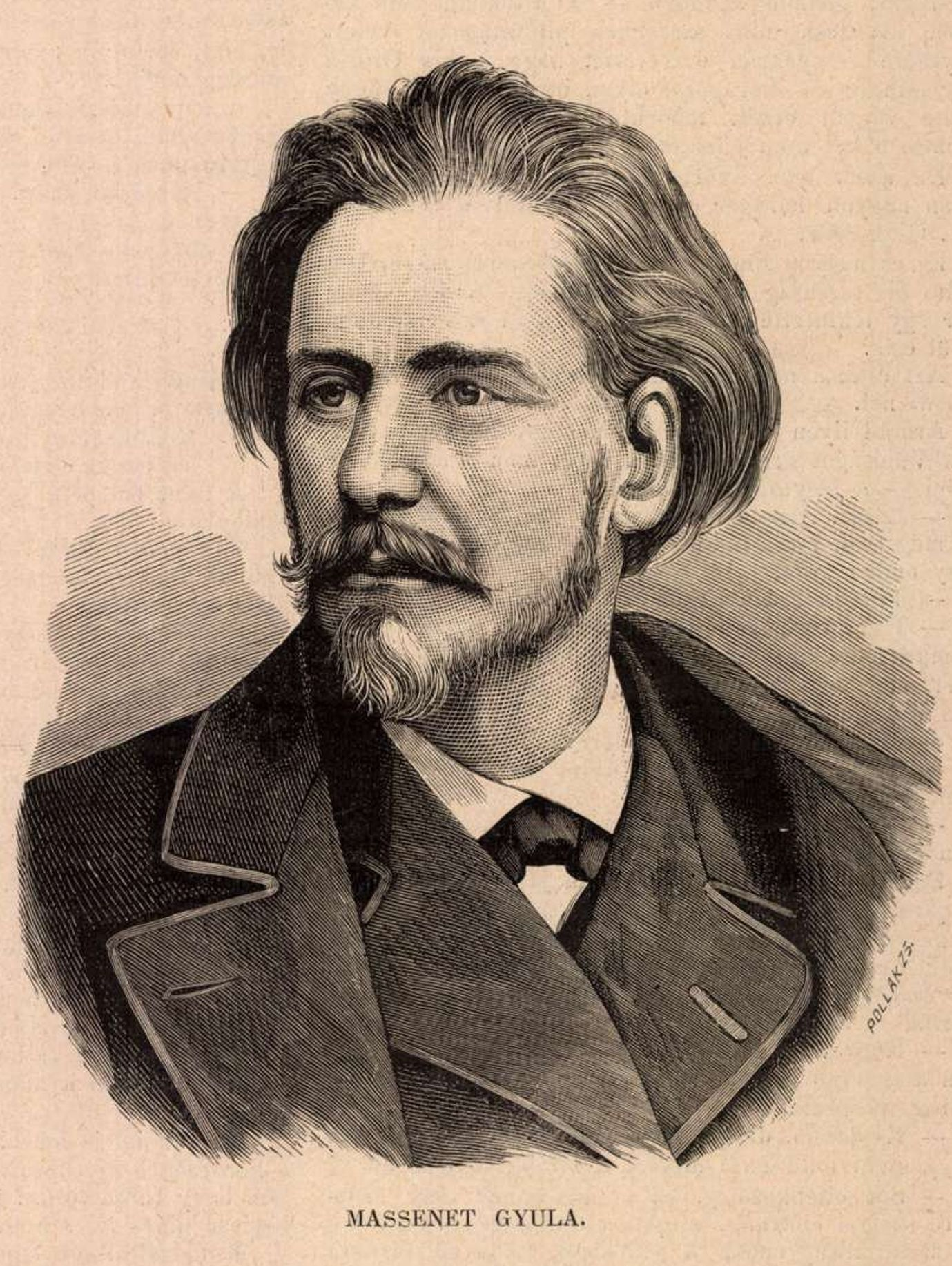
Jules Massenet in 1885

Ève is an oratorio composed by Jules Massenet, with a French libretto by Louis Gallet. It was first performed at the Cirque d'été in Paris on 18 March 1875, two years after Massenet composed his more widely disseminated oratorio Marie-Magdeleine. Ève (1875) shares a new interpretation of the biblical story of Adam and Eve. Set for orchestra, chorus, and three soloists, the oratorio contains typical textures of the Late-Romantic and Impressionist eras.

== Principal characters ==
- Ève (soprano)
- Adam (baritone)
- Le Récitant (tenor)

With principal parts for Adam and Eve, the chorus remains present throughout as agents for both good and evil or as the voice of nature

== Structure and story ==
Ève is a recounting of the story of Adam and Eve, and an interpretation of the biblical narration of Eve succumbing to evil's temptation to commit original sin, and the fallout that occurs thereafter. It can be considered as a three-part oratorio consisting of five smaller pieces (one of which is a short prologue).

=== Premiere Partie ===
After an introduction La Naissance de la femme, featuring the creation of the first woman, the newly formed Ève joins Adam in the Garden of Eden, where (in the first major piece Adam et Ève) they experience contented piety matching the idyllic existence described in the Book of Genesis 2:15-25.

=== Deuxieme Partie ===
Ève dans la Solitude marks a turning point when Ève becomes tempted by the forbidden fruit while Adam sleeps.

=== Troisieme Partie ===
Ève brings the fruit to Adam, which they share in La Faute, and this disruptive mistake culminates in a riotous final piece, La Malediction, in which they are struck by God's curse and are cast out of Eden forever.

== Belief Underlying Eve ==
Eve is simple and untheatrical. With principal parts for Adam and Ève, the chorus remains present throughout the work as an agent for both good and evil. Gallet's libretto for Ève contains a few important changes from the biblical story, which greatly affect the meaning of the oratorio: the tree of knowledge of good and evil becomes the tree of science, “The Voices of the Night” replace the serpent, the forbidden fruit is now “the fruit of love,” and the chorus replaces God's interaction with Adam and Eve by acting as “The Voices of Nature".

== Importance of the Oratorio in Massenet's work ==
In 1873 Massenet initiated a series of sacred dramas based on the lives of female biblical characters. The two oratorios Eve and Marie Magdaleine laid the foundation of Massenet's inclination for themes with an amalgam of eroticism and religiosity that would develop in many of his later operas such as Herodiade and Esclaramonde. These operas build on themes present in his formative works: the conflict among religion, eroticism, and orientalism. Thais constitutes perhaps the most open exploration of his analysis of the religious and the erotic.

== Recordings ==
- Ève French Oratorio Orchestra and Choir, conducted by Jean-Pierre Lore, Erol 1995
- Ève live performance, Euregio Symphony Orchestra and Three Nation Choir, conducted by Jean-Pierre Faber, Arte Nova 1998
- Ève Orchestra Sinfonica Ab Harmoniae, directed by Daniele Agiman 2009
