= Donald Lambert =

American jazz musician

Donald "The Lamb" Lambert (February 12, 1904 – May 8, 1962) was an American jazz stride pianist born in Princeton, New Jersey, United States, perhaps best known for playing in Harlem night clubs throughout the 1920s. Lambert was taught piano by his mother but never learned to read music. With his particularly rapid left hand striding technique, he was a formidable opponent in cutting contests. On one occasion, Lambert challenged Art Tatum at a jazz concert where other famous players were present.

Lambert's discography is sparse: the only commercial recordings under his name were four titles made for RCA's Bluebird label in 1941, in which he interpreted classical themes: Richard Wagner's Pilgrim's Chorus from Tannhäuser, "Anitra's Dance" by Edvard Grieg, Gaetano Donizetti's Sextet from Lucia di Lammermoor, and Jules Massenet's Élégie. However, several compilations were released in the 1980s containing live recordings dating from 1959–62. Lambert appeared at the 1960 Newport Jazz Festival, alongside Eubie Blake and Willie "The Lion" Smith and was said to have outplayed both of them.

His nicknames included the "Jersey Rocket", "The Lamb", "Muffin", and "The Lamb of God".

== Discography ==
- RCA [France] 741.118/9 Harlem Stride Pianists 1960-1962 (included the four Bluebird sides from 1941)
- IAJRC Donald Lambert: Meet the Lamb
- Pumpkin Harlem Stride Classics
