= Op. 70 =

In music, Op. 70 stands for Opus number 70. Compositions that are assigned this number include:

- Beethoven – Piano Trios, Op. 70
- Britten – Nocturnal after John Dowland
- Chopin – Waltzes, Op. 70
- Dvořák – Symphony No. 7
- Godard – Les Guelfes
- Mendelssohn – Elijah
- Prokofiev – The Queen of Spades
- Rubinstein – Piano Concerto No. 4
- Schumann – Adagio and Allegro for Horn and Piano
- Scriabin – Piano Sonata No. 10
- Shostakovich – Symphony No. 9
- Sibelius – Luonnotar, tone poem for soprano and orchestra (1913)
- Stanford – Violin Sonata No. 2
- Strauss – Schlagobers
- Tchaikovsky – Souvenir de Florence
