= Étienne Marcel (opera) =

1879 opera by Camille Saint-Saëns

- Opera by Camille Saint-Saëns
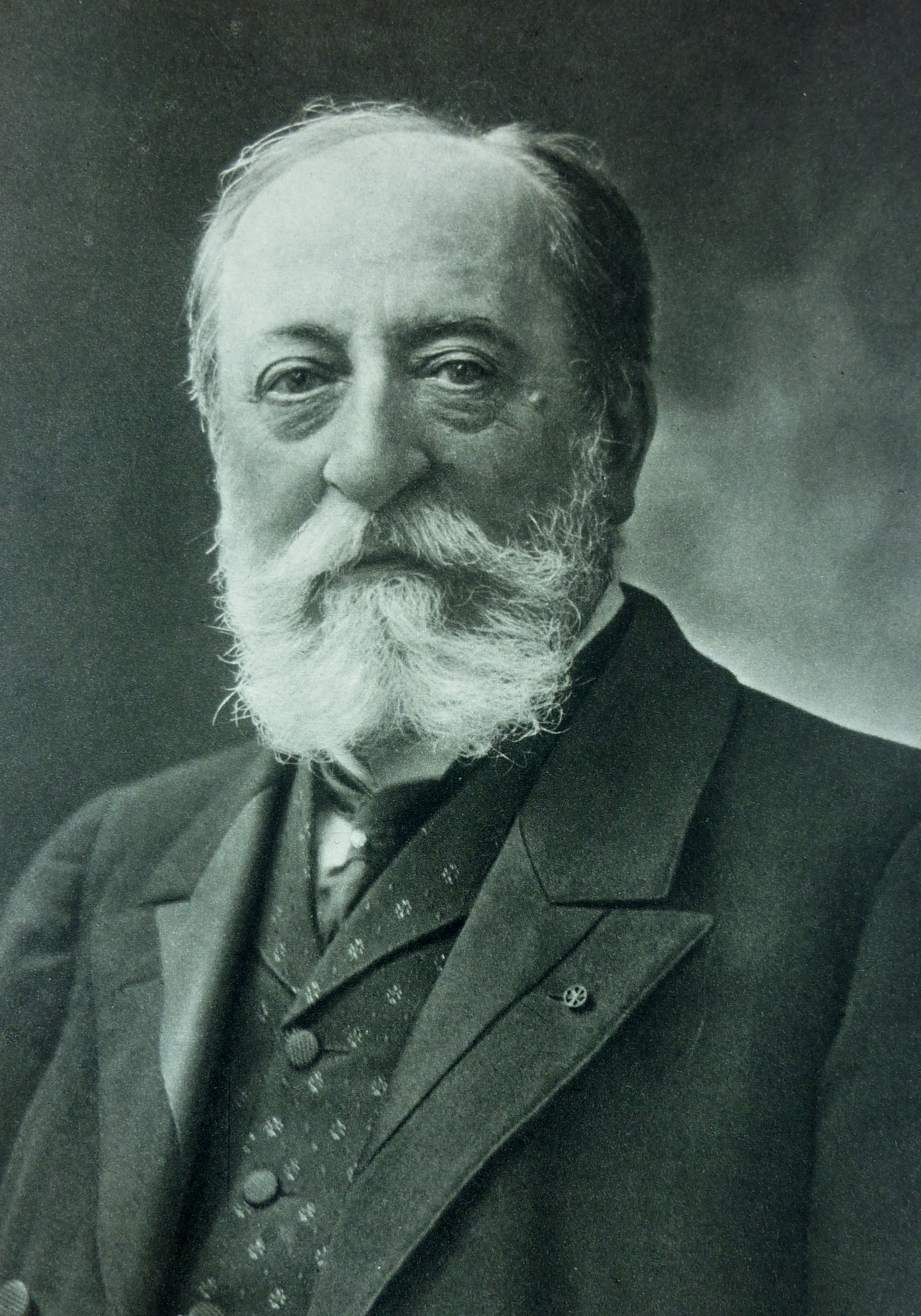
- The composer
- Librettist: Louis Gallet
- Language: French
- Premiere: 8 February 1879; Grand-Théâtre de Lyon

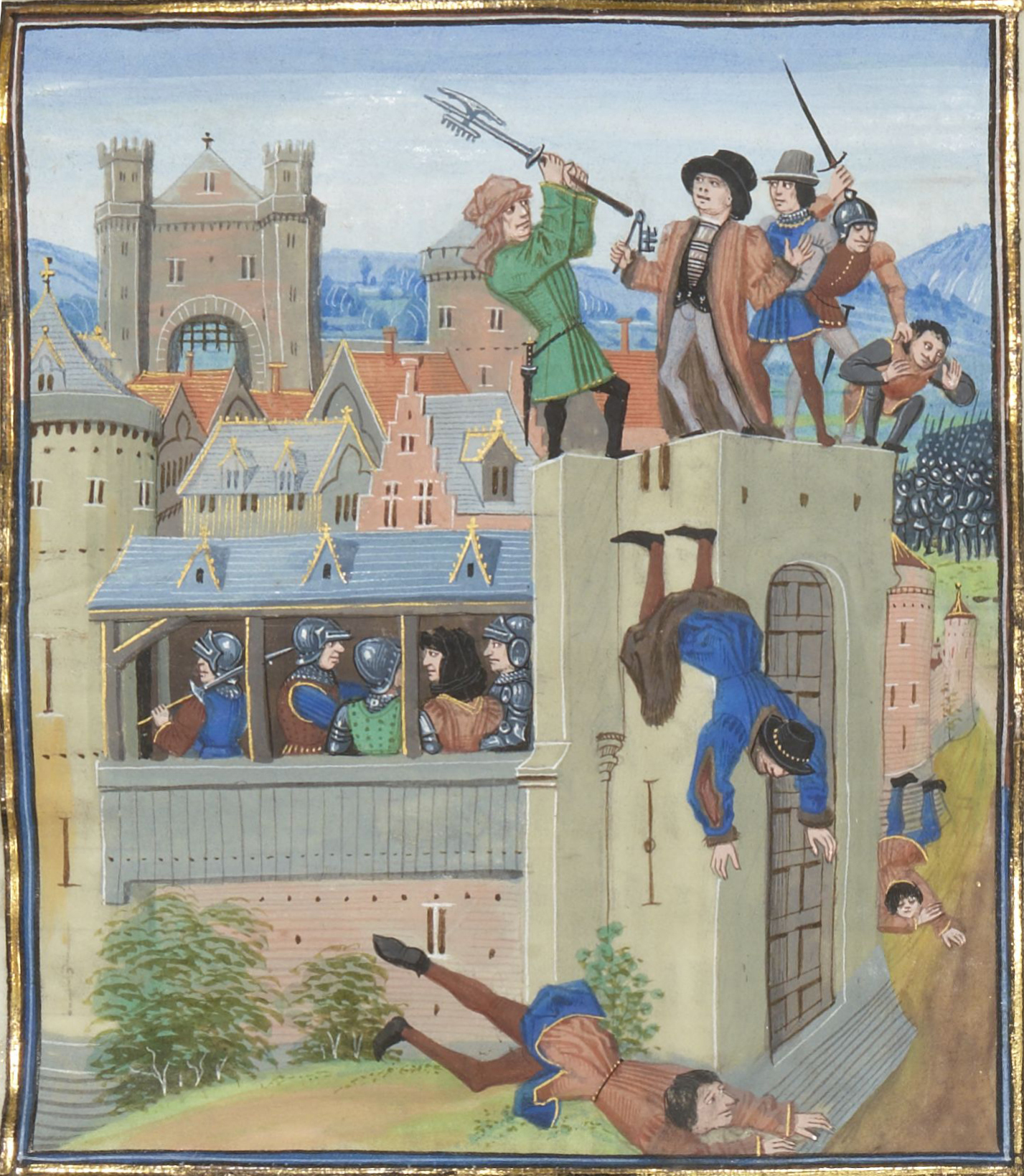
The assassination of Étienne Marcel in the course of the Jacquerie, 31 July 1358

Étienne Marcel is an 1879 opera in 4 acts by Camille Saint-Saëns to a libretto by Louis Gallet. It premiered at Lyon's Grand-Theatre on 8 February 1879, with further performances in Paris (14 October 1884, Théâtre du Château-d'Eau), Rouen (26 March 1885, Théâtre des Arts de Rouen) and Monaco (7 March 1918 Théâtre de Monte-Carlo). The action is set in Paris in the first half of 1358, during the English captivity of le bon roi John II of France.

== Roles ==
Roles, vice types, premiere cast
Role	Voice type	Premiere cast, 8 February 1879 Conductor: Alexandre Luigini
Étienne Marcel, prévôt des marchands	baritone	Delrat
Robert de Loris , écuyer du Dauphin	tenor	Stéphanne
Eustache	baritone	Pol Plançon
Robert de Clermont, maréchal de Normandie	basse chantant	De Grave
Jehan Maillard	bass	Echetto
Pierre, jeune seigneur, ami de Robert	tenor	Hans Baron (tenor)
L'Hôtelier	tenor	Nerval
Béatrix, fille d'Étienne Marcel	soprano falcon	Reine Mézeray
Le Dauphin Charles	contralto	Amélie Luigini
Marguerite, mère de Béatrix	Mezzo-soprano	Legénisel
Un héraut	tenor	
Un artisan	baritone	
Denis, serviteur d'Étienne Marcel	tenor	
Un soldat	tenor	

== Recordings ==
- Radio broadcast recording: Étienne Marcel – Alain Fondary; Béatrix – Michèle Lagrange; Eustache – Franck Ferrari; Robert de Loris – Daniel Galvez-Vallejo; Jean Maillard – Philippe Fourcade; Marguerite/le dauphin Charles – Alexandra Papadjakou; Choeur de l'Opéra national de Montpellier, Choir of the Opéra de Strasbourg, Orchestre national de Montpellier Languedoc-Roussillon, conductor Hubert Soudant, 11 July 1994
