= Constantin Esarcu =

Romanian naturalist, physician and teacher

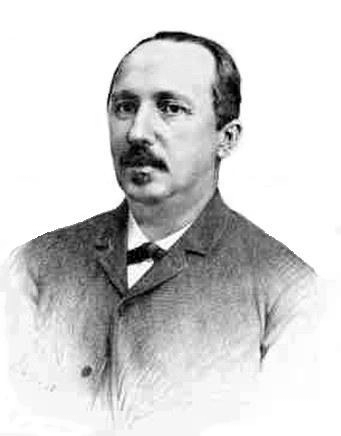

Minister of Foreign Affairs of Kingdom of Romania
- In office 21 February 1891 – 26 November 1891
- Monarch: Carol I of Romania
- Preceded by: Alexandru Lahovary
- Succeeded by: Alexandru Lahovary

Personal details
- Born: 5 November 1836 Bucharest
- Died: 8 June 1898 (aged 61) Govora, Mihăești, Vâlcea

Constantin Esarcu (5 November 1836 – 8 June 1898) was a naturalist, physician, teacher, politician and diplomat who served as the Minister of Foreign Affairs of Kingdom of Romania from 21 February until 26 November 1891.

Esarcu graduated from a university in Bucharest and Sorbonne University in Paris. In 1864, he received his doctoral degree in medicine. He also served as the Romanian ambassador to France. In 1884, he was elected a corresponding member of the Romanian Academy.

He died on 8 June 1898 in Govora, Mihăești, Vâlcea.

== See also ==
- Foreign relations of Romania
