= Ioan Lahovary =

Romanian politician (1844–1915)

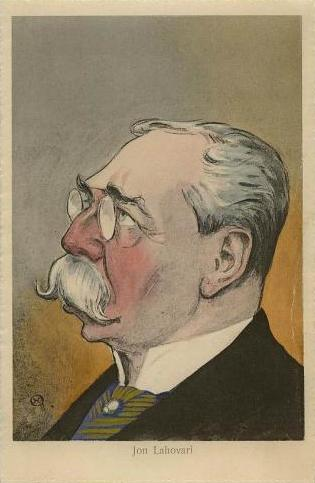
- Caricature by Nicolae Petrescu-Găină

President of the Romanian Senate
- In office 3 July 1913 – 11 January 1914
- Monarch: Carol I
- Preceded by: Theodor Rosetti
- Succeeded by: Basile M. Missir

Minister of Foreign Affairs of Romania
- In office April 11, 1899 – July 6, 1900
- Prime Minister: Gheorghe Grigore Cantacuzino
- Preceded by: Dimitrie A. Sturdza
- Succeeded by: Alexandru Marghiloman
- In office March 12, 1907 – December 27, 1908
- Prime Minister: Dimitrie Sturdza
- Preceded by: General Iacob Lahovary
- Succeeded by: Dimitrie A. Sturdza

Personal details
- Born: January 25, 1844 Bucharest, Wallachia
- Died: June 14, 1915 (aged 71) Bucharest, Kingdom of Romania
- Spouse: Emma Lahovary
- Children: Five, including Princess Marthe Bibesco
- Relatives: Alexandru Lahovary (brother); Iacob Lahovary (brother)

Ioan N. Lahovary or Ion Lahovari (January 25, 1844 – June 14, 1915) was a member of Romanian aristocracy, a politician and diplomat who served as the Minister of Foreign Affairs of Romania.

== Political career ==
Ioan Lahovary was the brother of Alexandru Lahovary, who also previously served as foreign minister and General Iacob Lahovary who was his predecessor in the post of Minister of Foreign Affairs and later Minister of War. He was elected deputy, being a member of the Conservative Party since 1871. Lahovary served two terms as foreign minister: from April 11, 1899, until July 6, 1900, in the Gheorghe Gr. Cantacuzino Cabinet and March 12, 1907, until December 27, 1908.

He was a member of the senate from the conservative party, and he also served as chairman of the Senate.

Ioan Lahovary died on June 14, 1915, in Bucharest.

== Personal life ==
He was married to Princess Emma Mavrocordato (1860–1920), daughter of Prince Alexandru Mavrocordato (1819–1895) and his wife Elise Millo. They had five children. Among them was Princess Marthe Bibesco, a famous Romanian writer.

== Gallery ==
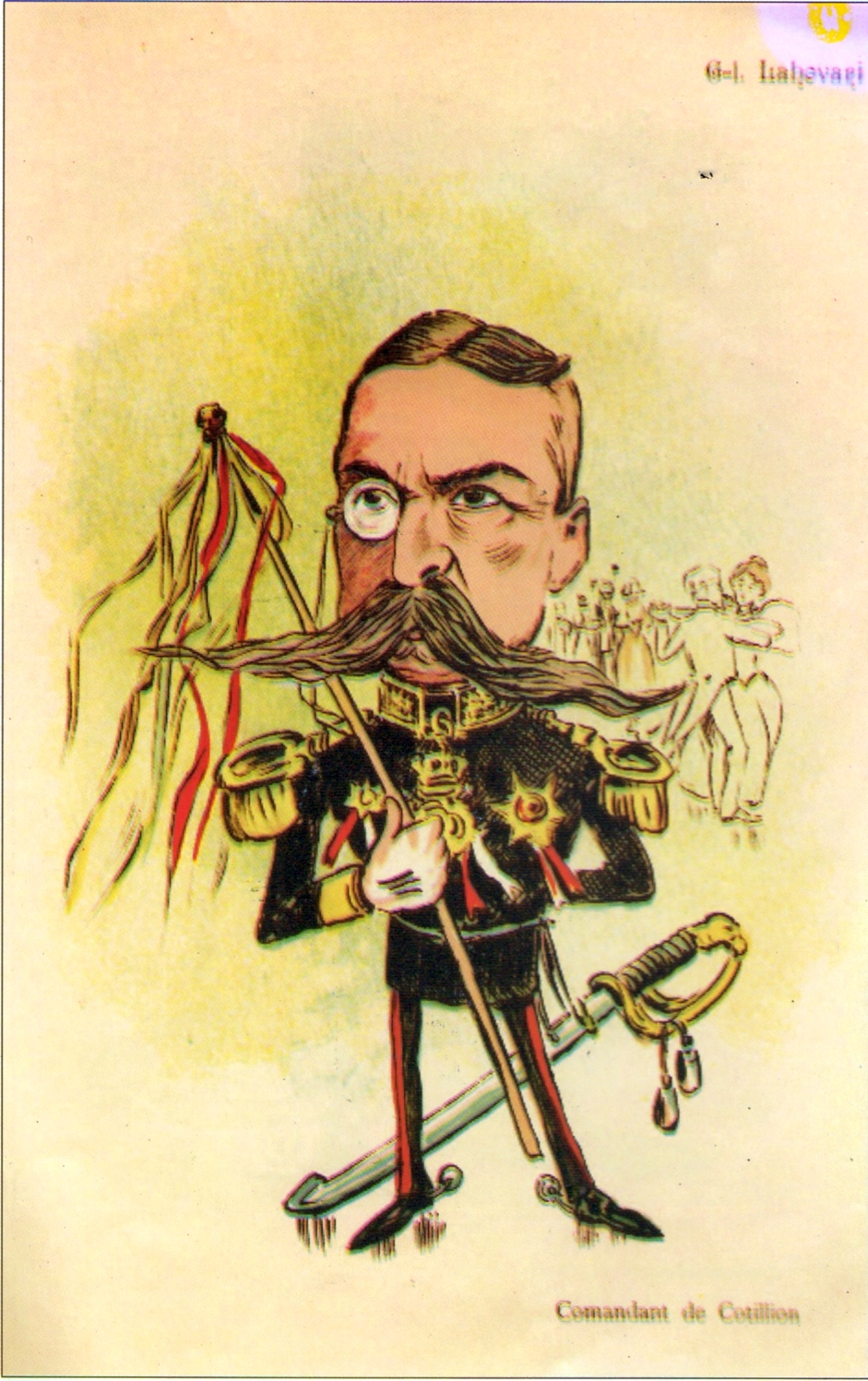
Ioan Lahovary - caricature by Nicolae S. Petrescu-Găină

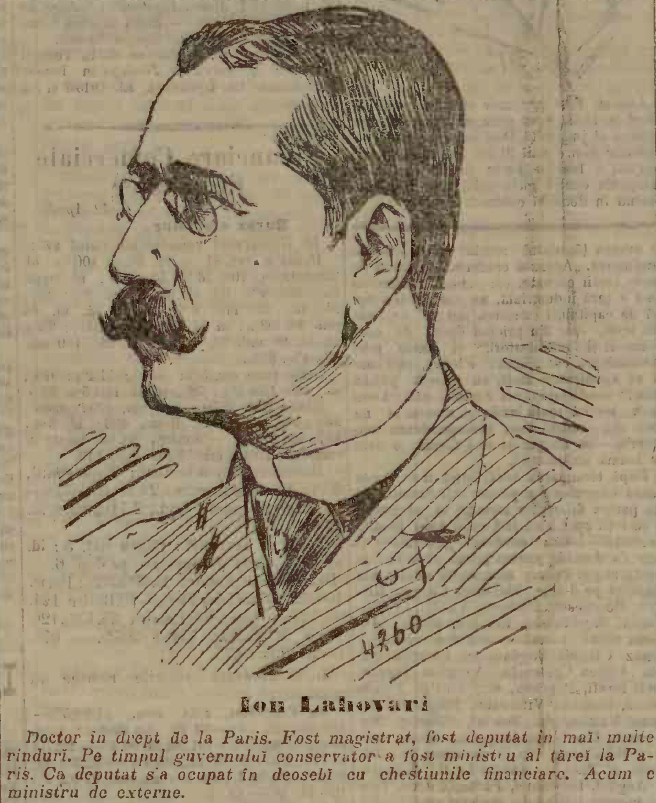
Ioan Lahovary's photo, appeared in the Adevărul newspaper in 1899

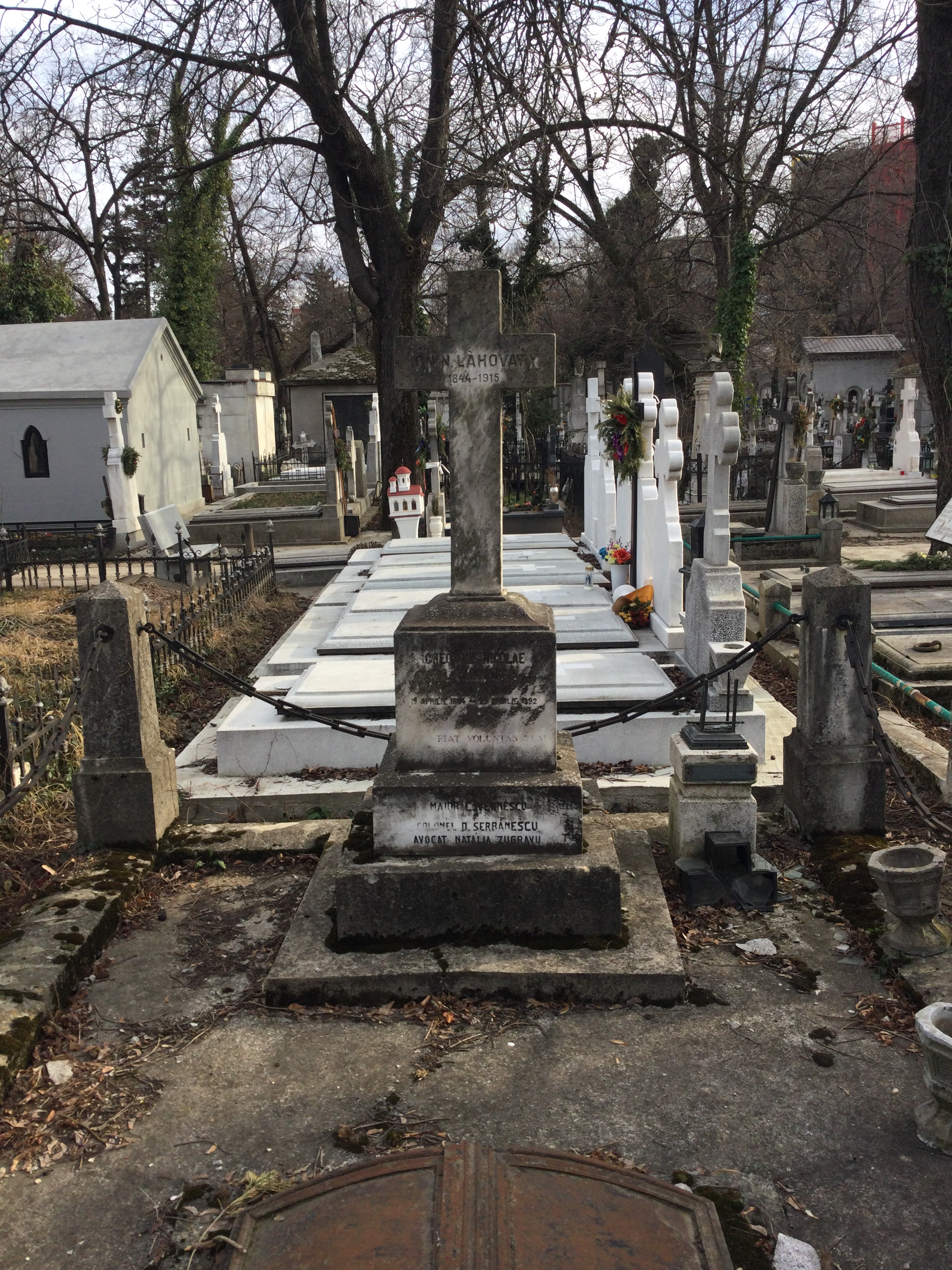
Grave at Bellu Cemetery

== See also ==
- Foreign relations of Romania

Political offices
Preceded by Dimitrie Sturdza	Minister of Foreign Affairs; 1899-1900	Succeeded by Alexandru Marghiloman
Preceded by Iacob Lahovary	Minister of Foreign Affairs; 1907-1908	Succeeded by Dimitrie Sturdza
Preceded by Theodor Rosetti	President of the Senate; 1913-1914	Succeeded by Basile M. Missir
