= Le Déluge (Saint-Saëns) =

Oratorio by Camille Saint-Saëns

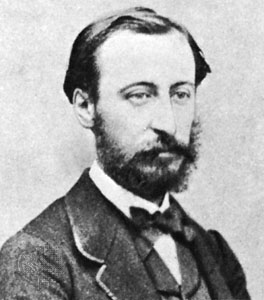
Camille Saint-Saëns in 1875

Le Déluge ('The Flood'), Op. 45, is a French oratorio written by Camille Saint-Saëns in 1875 and scored for orchestra, chorus, and soloists. The libretto, a "poème biblique" by Louis Gallet, is based on the biblical story of Noah and the flood. It was premiered at the Théâtre du Châtelet on 5 March 1876, under the direction of Edouard Colonne.

Stylistically, the work shows the influence of Berlioz and Wagner in its musical illustrations of the narrative and use of recurring motifs. It also displays Saint-Saëns's strong predilection for counterpoint; there are three fugues incorporated into the music.

The work is divided into three parts and a prelude:

- Prélude
- I. Corruption de l'homme — Colère de Dieu — Alliance avec Noé
- II. L'Arche — Le Déluge
- III. La Colombe — Sortie de l'Arche — Bénédiction de Dieu

The prelude is scored for strings only and contains a passage for solo violin. Part I describes the sinfulness of man and God's decision to destroy the world ("J'exterminerai cette race"). Part II is a long crescendo and decrescendo depicting the rain and rising waters of the flood. Part III evokes the flights of the dove and ends with God's promise not to curse the earth ("Je ne maudirai plus la terre") and a choral fugue ("Croissez donc et multipliez").

Although Le Déluge is sometimes listed among Saint-Saëns' best compositions, it is rarely performed today. The prelude is sometimes extracted as a concert piece.
