= Jean Conte =

French violinist and composer

Jean Conte (12 May 1830 – 1 April 1888) was a French violinist, composer, and music teacher.

== Career ==
Born in Toulouse, Conte attended the conservatory of Toulouse, founded shortly before as a branch of the Conservatoire de Paris, which at the time was directed by Louis Debrucq. After outstanding results in violin and solfège he was sent to Paris, where he studied violin with Jean-Delphin Alard and Lambert Massart and composition with Michele Carafa.

Conte financed his studies as a conductor at the Théâtre des Jeunes-Acteurs, founded by Louis Comte and directed by Jacques Offenbach in 1855. In that year, Conte won the Premier Grand Prix de Rome with the cantata Acis et Galatée after Camille du Locle. During his stay at the Villa Medici in Rome, traditionally associated with the prize, he composed a Messe solennelle (1856), the Italian opera Isabelle di Lara (1857) as well as a Dies irae and a symphony.

After his return to Paris Conte became a teacher at the music school of the Frères de Passy and in 1867 violist in the orchestra of the Paris Opera and the Orchestre de la Société des Concerts du Conservatoire. Together with Adrien Barthe he composed a double concerto for violin and piano based on Italian songs. At the Opéra-Comique, his opera Beppo was premiered in 1877 after a libretto by Louis Gallet. Furthermore, he composed a number of songs (Où vont donc les hirondelles, Le Grand Veneur, La Marchande de plaisirs) and published a Méthode de violon.
