= Alexandru Lahovary =

Romanian politician (1841–1897)

Alexandru N. Lahovary
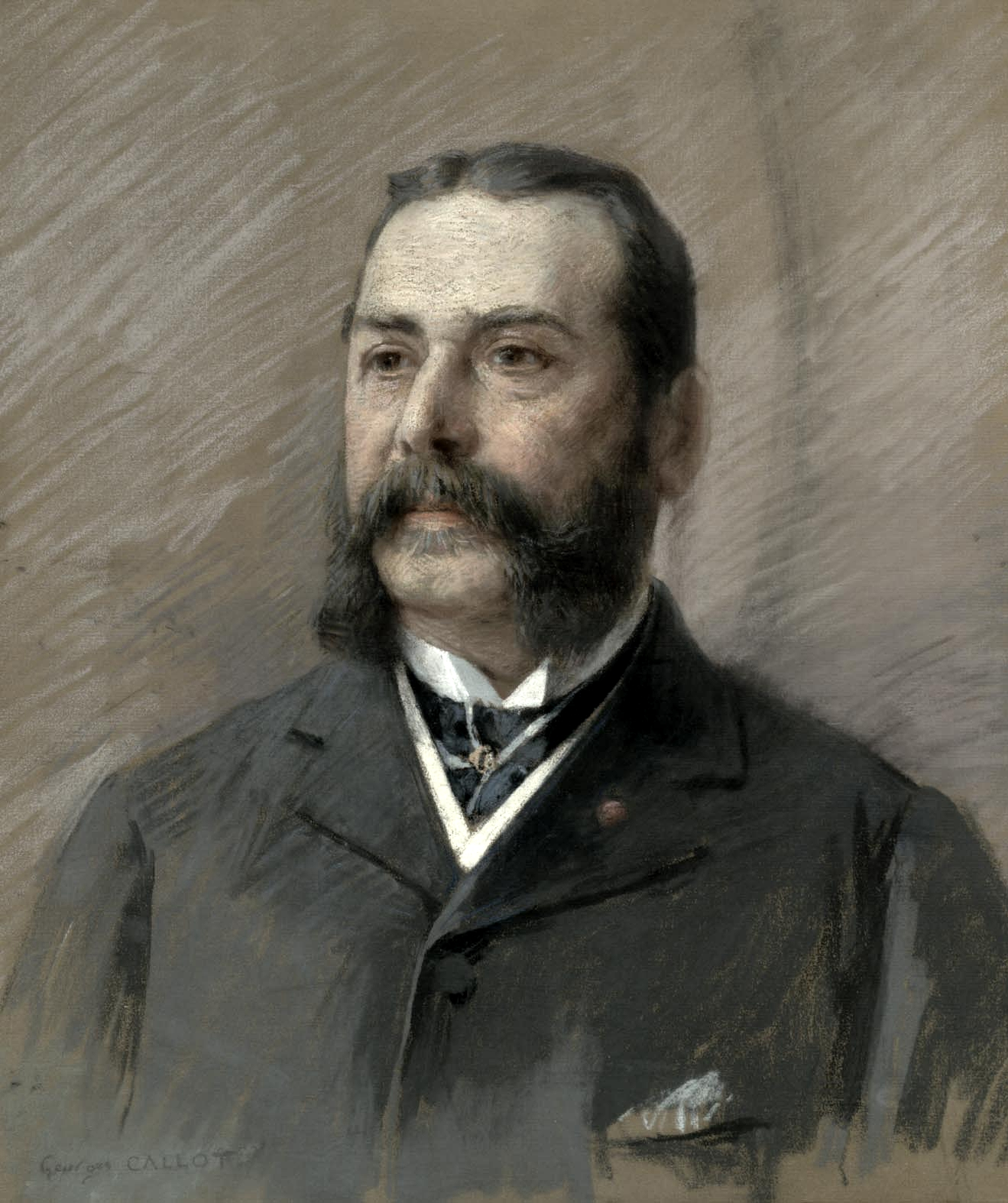

Minister of Justice
- In office April 20, 1870 – December 14, 1870
- Monarch: Carol I of Romania
- In office October 25, 1873 – March 30, 1876

Minister of Agriculture, Industry, Trade and Property
- In office November 12, 1888 – March 22, 1889
- Monarch: Carol I of Romania

Minister of Public Works
- In office March 29, 1889 – November 3, 1889
- Monarch: Carol I of Romania

Minister of Foreign Affairs of Kingdom of Romania
- In office November 5, 1889 – February 15, 1891
- Monarch: Carol I of Romania
- Preceded by: Petre P. Carp
- Succeeded by: Constantin Esarcu
- In office November 27, 1891 – October 3, 1895
- Preceded by: Constantin Esarcu
- Succeeded by: Dimitrie Sturdza

Personal details
- Born: August 16, 1841 Bucharest, Principality of Wallachia
- Died: March 4, 1897 (aged 55) Paris, France
- Relatives: Iacob Lahovary (brother); Ioan Lahovary (brother)

Alexandru N. Lahovary (surname also spelled Lahovari; August 16, 1841 – March 4, 1897) was a member of the Romanian aristocracy, a politician and diplomat who served as the Minister of Justice, Minister of Agriculture, Industry, Trade and Property, Minister of Public Works and Minister of Foreign Affairs of Kingdom of Romania.

== Life and political career ==
Alexandru Lahovary was the brother of Ioan Lahovary, who served as foreign minister within the Royal government, and General Iacob Lahovary, who also served as Minister of Foreign Affairs and later Minister of War. He was born as a member of the Lahovary family, an old noble Boyar family to Nicolae Lahovary (1816–1883), who served as Senator and his wife, Eufrosina Iacovache (1825–1884) from Râmnicu Vâlcea (maybe related to the House of Lackovic). After being tutored by private teachers, he moved to Paris to teach. In Paris, he also completed his doctoral studies in 1865. In July 1867, he entered foreign service and from July 30 until October 11, 1867, he was the general secretary of the Ministry of Foreign Affairs. Lahovary was then appointed the Minister of Justice and served in this capacity for two terms: from April 20 through December 14, 1870, and October 25, 1873, until March 30, 1876. From November 12, 1888, until March 22, 1889, he was Minister of Agriculture, Industry, Trade and Property and from March 29 through November 3, 1889, he served as the Minister of Public Works. His last ministerial position was at the Ministry of Foreign Affairs where he held the office for two terms from November 5, 1889, until February 15, 1891, and from November 27, 1891, until October 3, 1895.

Lahovary died on March 4, 1897, in Paris. The Alexandru Lahovari National College in Râmnicu Vâlcea is named after the diplomat. A square in central Bucharest is named after him; a statue of Lahovary (built by sculptor Antonin Mercié in 1901) is in the middle of the square.

== See also ==
- Foreign relations of Romania
- The works of Antonin Mercié
