= Cahen =

Cahen is a surname and/or a first name that may refer to:

- Cahen's constant, an infinite series of unit fractions, with alternating signs, derived from Sylvester's sequence
- Cahen–Mellin integral, an integral transform

== People ==
- Albert Cahen (1846–1903), French composer
- Claude Cahen (1909–1991), French orientalist and Islamic historian
- Coralie Cahen (1832–1899), philanthropist
- Ernest Cahen (1828–1893), French composer and organist
- Enrique Cahen Salaberry (1911–1991), Argentine film director
- Louis Cahen d'Anvers (1837–1922), French banker
- Mónica Cahen D'Anvers (born 1934), Argentine journalist, TV news host, and actress
- Fritz Max Cahén (1891–1966), German journalist, writer, and spy

== See also ==
- Cohen (surname), Kohen, Cohan, Cahan
