= Proserpine (Saint-Saëns) =

Drame lyrique in four acts by Camille Saint-Saëns

- Drame lyrique by Camille Saint-Saëns
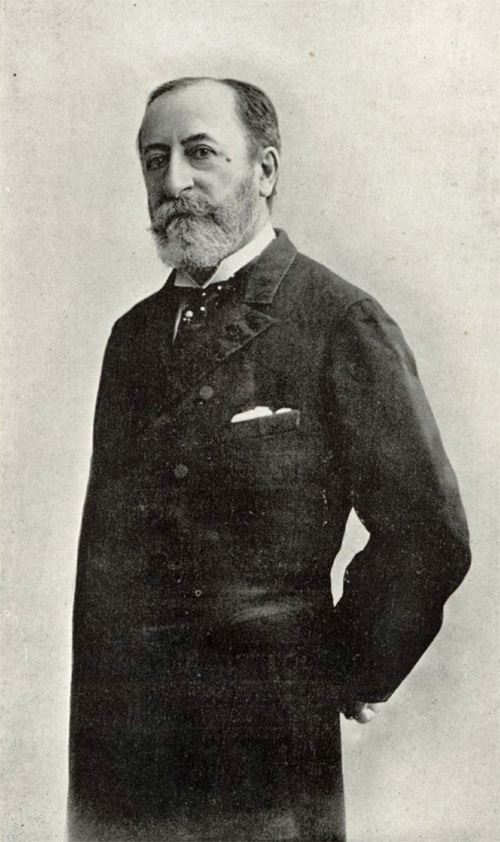
- The composer in 1880s
- Librettist: Louis Gallet
- Language: French

Proserpine is an 1887 drame lyrique in four acts by Camille Saint-Saëns to a libretto by Louis Gallet after Auguste Vacquerie. Its run time is 95 minutes.

== Background ==
After the Camille Saint-Saëns became intrigued by August Vacquerie's play (Proserpine, written in 1838) and the Italian aspects of it, Saint-Saëns and Vacquerie agreed on composing Proserpine in the Italian style. The project was never realized as initially intended, but was returned to a few years later after a dinner party brought the pair back together. They, with a third collaborator in librettist Louis Gallet, ended up writing the opera as a drame lyrique, though the story still takes place in Italy. A trip to Florence by Saint-Saëns inspired this setting and atmosphere of the opera.

== Roles ==
Role	Voice Type	Original cast conducted by Jules Danbé	2016 cast conducted by Ulf Schirmer
Proserpine	soprano	Caroline Salla	Veronique Gens
Angiola	soprano	Cécile Simonnet	Marie-Adeline Henry
Sabatino	tenor	Guillaume Albert Lubert	Frédéric Antoun
Squarocca	baritone	Émile-Alexandre Taskin	Andrew Foster-Williams
Renzo	bass	M. Cobalet	Jean Teitgen
Orlando	tenor	M. Herbert	Mathias Vidal
Ercole	baritone	M. Collin	Philippe-Nicolas Martin
Filippo	tenor	M. Caisso	Artavazd Sargsyan
Gil	tenor	M. Barnolt	Artavazd Sargsyan
A nun (une religieuse)	soprano	Mme. Perret	Clémence Tilquin
Three young girls (trois jeunes filles)	two sopranos, one contralto	Mmes. Mary, Augusta, Esposito	
Three novices (trois novices)	two sopranos, one contralto	Mmes. Balanqué, Barria, Nardi	
Lords, mendicants, nuns, soldiers (Seigneurs, mendiants, religieuses, soldats)	SATB choir		Flemish Radio Choir

== Instrumentation and composition ==
Along with vocal soloists and an SATB chorus, Proserpine features: an off-stage orchestra (flute, viola, violoncello, harp, organ, bell) and an on-stage orchestra (piccolo, 2 flutes, 2 oboes, English horn, 2 clarinets (A/B♭), 2 bassoons, contrabassoon, 4 horns (D/F/A/G), 2 cornets (A/B♭), 3 trombones, tuba, timpani, percussion (triangle, bass drum, cymbals), harp, strings).

Proserpine features no spoken dialogue.

Saint-Saëns used leitmotifs, a compositional technique commonly associated with Wagner, whom he greatly admired.

== Performance history ==
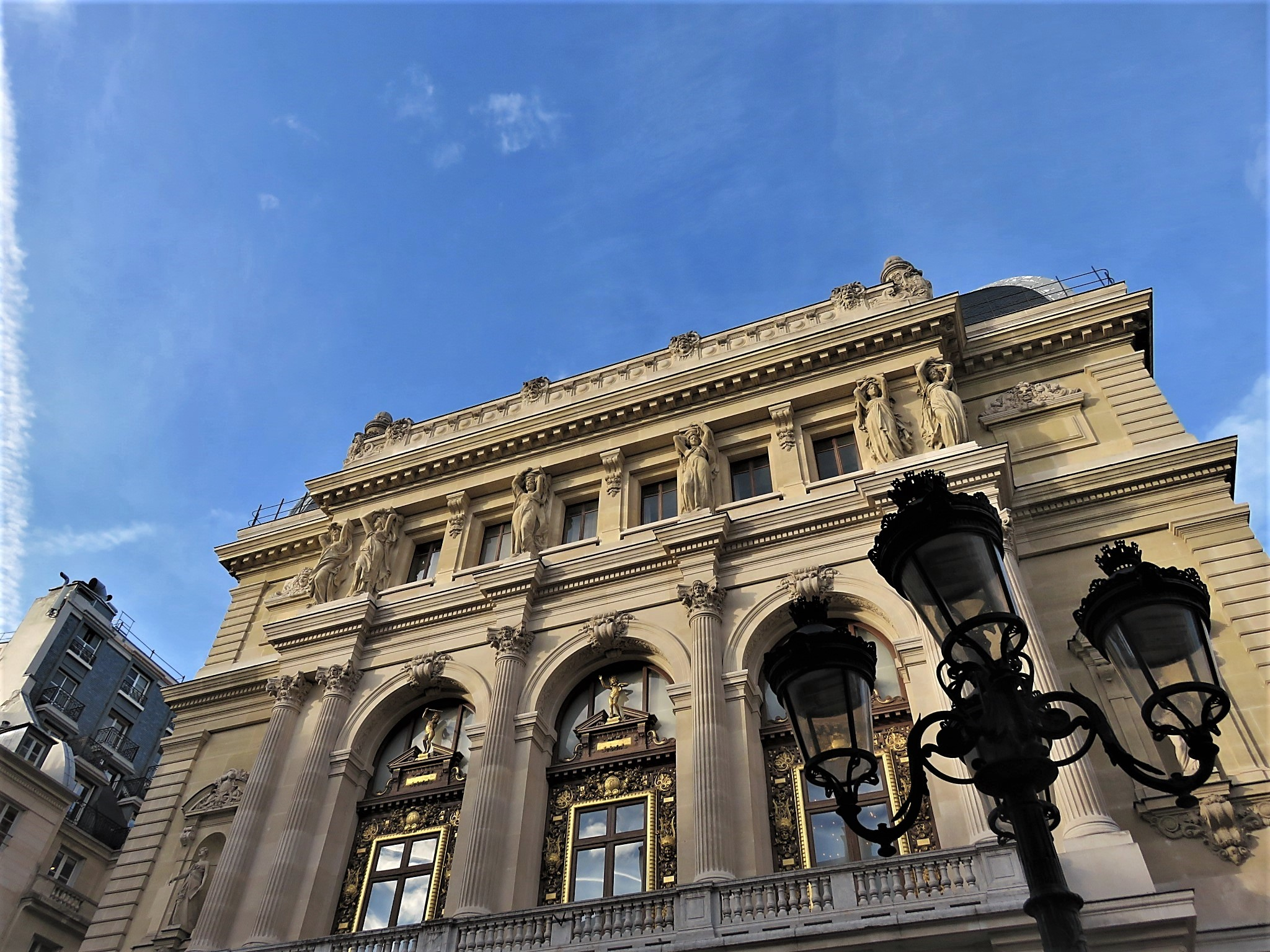
La Théâtre de l'Opéra-Comique in 2018

- On March 14th, 1887, Proserpine was performed for the first time in Paris at the Théâtre de l'Opéra-Comique.
- It was performed in concert and recorded on October 7th and 9th in Munich in 2016. The cast was joined by the Munich Radio Orchestra, the Flemish Radio Choir, and Ulf Schirmer as the conductor. The project was sponsored by Palazzetto Bru Zane, one of many of their recordings of lesser-known French operas.

== Reception ==
At the time of its premiere, critics of Proserpine, as well as the general public, found it unusual (due to a lack of spoken dialogue) and its composition inordinately complex for a theatrical work.
