= Les Guelfes =

1898 grand opéra by Benjamin Godard

Les Guelfes, Op. 70, is an 1898 French-language grand opéra by Benjamin Godard in five acts to a libretto by Louis Gallet. It premiered posthumously on 12 August 1902 at the Théâtre des Arts in Rouen.

== Recordings ==
- Aria "Là-bas, vers le palais", Véronique Gens, Münchner Rundfunkorchester, Hervé Niquet 2017
