= Les Érinnyes =

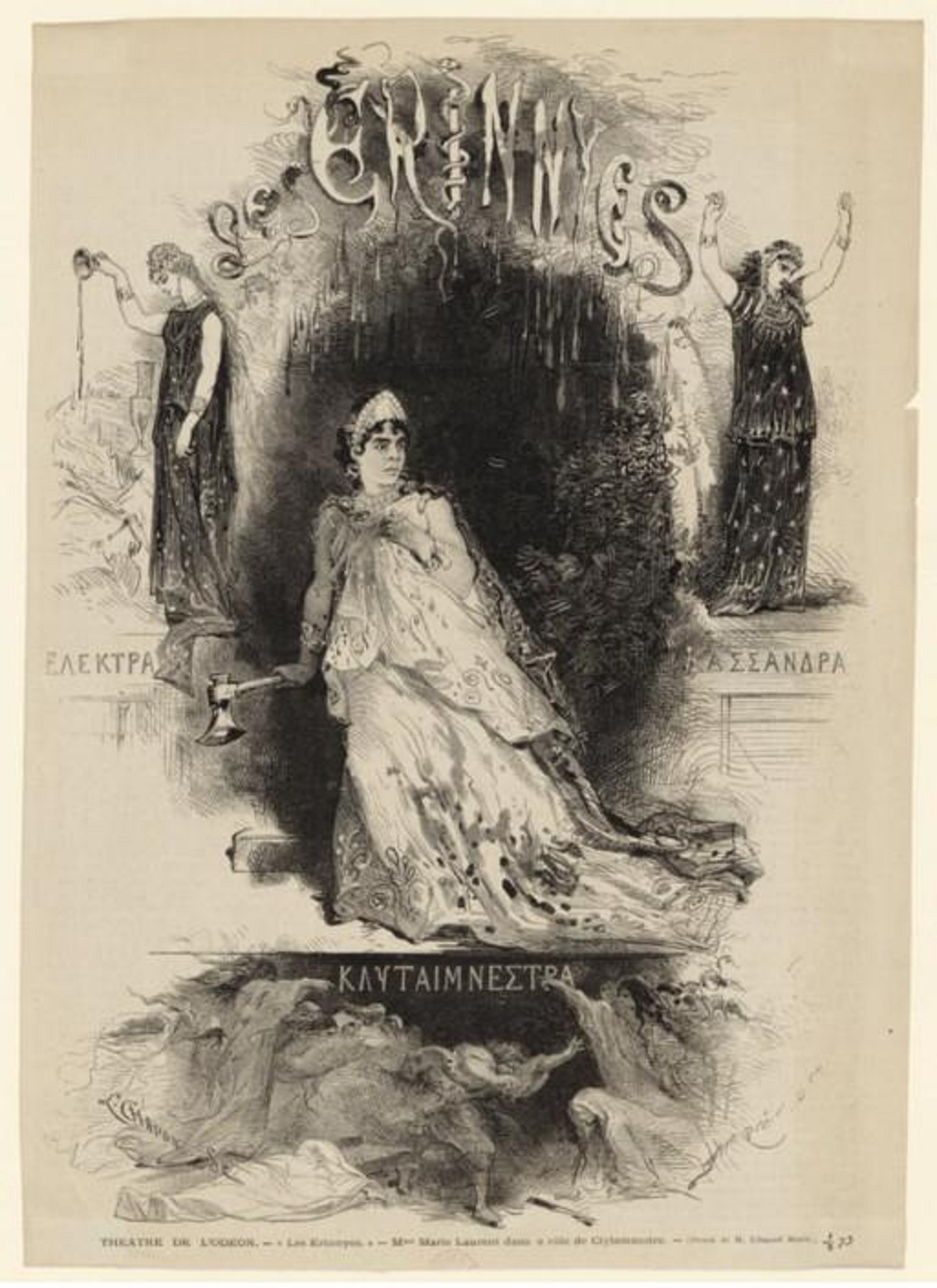

Les Érinnyes (The Erinyes) is a French language verse drama written by Leconte de Lisle and premièred at the Théâtre de l'Odéon in 1873. It is in the style of a Greek tragedy, in two acts: Klytaimnestra (Clytemnestra) and Orestès (Orestes). It was an adaptation of the first two parts of Aeschylus' Oresteia (Agamemnon and Libation Bearers). The text was printed in de Lisle's collection Poèmes Tragiques.

== Massenet's music ==
Félix-Henri Duquesnel produced a revival of the play in 1876 at the Théâtre du Gaité. He commissioned his friend Jules Massenet to write an overture, intermezzo, and incidental music (respectively a Prélude, Entr'acte, and two Mélodrames). The music (Opus number 10) was conducted at the première by Édouard Colonne. It was an early boost to Massenet's career. He wrote in his memoirs:

Dusquesnel placed forty musicians at my disposal, which, under the circumstances, was a considerable expense and a great favor. Instead of writing a score for the regular orchestra—which would have produced only a paltry effect—I had the idea of having a quartet of thirty-six stringed instruments corresponding to a large orchestra. Then I added three trombones to represent the three Erinnyes: Tisiphone, Alecto and Megere, and a pair of kettle-drums. So I had my forty.

The "Invocation'" accompanies Electra's pouring of libations on the tomb of Agamemnon in act 2. It was published separately as the Élégie for cello and orchestra (Op.10, no.5) as well as the song "O doux printemps d'autrefois" and still often performed and recorded. Massenet originally wrote it as part of a competition to score the opera La coupe du roi de Thulé, with libretto by Louis Gallet and Édouard Blau. Massenet's entry came second to that of Eugène Diaz.
