= Louis Gallet =

French writer (1835–1898)

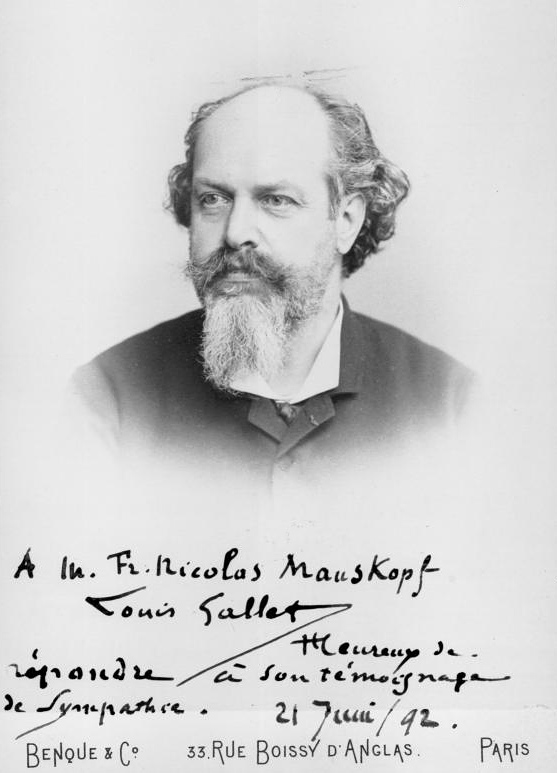
Louis Gallet in 1892

Louis Gallet (14 February 1835 in Valence, Drôme – 16 October 1898) was a French writer of operatic libretti, plays, romances, memoirs, pamphlets, and innumerable articles, who is remembered above all for his adaptations of fiction —and Scripture— to provide librettos of cantatas and opera, notably by composers Georges Bizet, Camille Saint-Saëns and Jules Massenet.

== Life and career ==
By day Gallet supported himself by a minor post in the Administration of Assistance to the Poor and positions, first as treasurer then as general administrator, at the Beaujon hospital, Paris, and other hospitals (ref. Saint-Saëns).

In 1871, Camille du Locle, the manager of the Paris Opéra-Comique, offered to produce a one-act work of Camille Saint-Saëns. He proposed as collaborator Louis Gallet, whom Saint-Saëns did not know, and the result was the slight piece La princesse jaune; it was notable as the first japonerie on the operatic stage, Japan having only very recently been opened to Western trade and the first Japanese woodblock prints having been seen in Paris only two years previously. The two worked together harmoniously for years, and it was Saint-Saëns who recommended Gallet as music critic for the Nouvelle Revue, though he was not a musician.

For Massenet, he first provided a libretto for the oratorio Marie-Magdeleine (1872) which proved to be Massenet's first major success and the first of his four dramatic oratorios.

Georges Bizet's one-act opera Djamileh to Gallet's libretto premiered successfully, 22 May 1872, at the Opéra-Comique, Paris), but two other Bizet operas by Gallet and Edouard Blau remained incomplete at Bizet's untimely death in 1875: La coupe du roi de Thulé (1869) and a five-act Don Rodrigue (1873).

In his libretto for Massenet's Thaïs, he employed an unrhymed free verse that he termed, in Parnassien fashion, poésie melique which, like its classical Greek predecessors, was designed for a declamation with accompaniment (melodrama). In Gallet's hands, declamation rose by degrees into a freely-structured aria that was raised above the level of prose by its sonorities and syntactical patterns, formulas that were finely suited to the musical techniques of both Saint-Saëns and Massenet. After Gallet's death, Saint-Saëns wrote:

I wish I knew what to say about the man himself, his unwearying goodness, his loyalty, his scrupulousness, his good humor, his originality, his continual common sense, and his intellect, alert to everything unusual and interesting.

== Works ==
=== Librettos ===
- Le Kobold, opera (Ernest Guiraud, 1870)
- Djamileh, opera (Georges Bizet, 1872)
- Marie-Magdeleine, oratorio (Jules Massenet, 1872)
- La princesse jaune, opera (Camille Saint-Saëns, 1872)
- La Coupe du Roi de Thulé, opera (Eugène Diaz, 1873)
- Ève, oratorio (Jules Massenet, 1875)
- Le Déluge, oratorio (Camille Saint-Saëns, 1876)
- La Clé d'Or; opera (Eugène Gautier, 1877)
- Le roi de Lahore, opera (Jules Massenet, 1877)
- Cinq-Mars, opera (Charles Gounod, 1877)
- Beppo, opera (Jean Conte, 1877)
- Étienne Marcel, opera (Camille Saint-Saëns, 1879)
- Le Vénitien, opera (Albert Cahen, 1880)
- Le Cid, opera (Jules Massenet, 1885)
- Patrie!, opera (Émile Paladilhe, 1886)
- Proserpine, opera (Camille Saint-Saëns, 1887)
- Michel Columb, opera (Louis Bourgault-Ducoudray, 1887)
- Ascanio, opera (Camille Saint-Saëns, 1890)
- Stratonice, opera (Émile-Eugène-Alix Fournier, 1892)
- Le Rêve, opera (Alfred Bruneau, 1891)
- Thamara, opera (Louis Bourgault-Ducoudray, 1891)
- Les Saintes-Maries-de-la-Mer, oratorio (Émile Paladilhe, 1892)
- L'Attaque du moulin, opera (Alfred Bruneau, 1893)
- Thaïs, opera (Jules Massenet, 1894)
- Frédégonde, opera (Ernest Guiraud and Camille Saint-Saëns, 1895)
- Le Chevalier Jean, opera (Victorin de Joncières, 1885)
- Photis, opera (Edmond Audran, 1895)
- Xavière, opera (Théodore Dubois, 1895)
- Ping-Sîn, opera (Henri Maréchal, 1895)
- La Femme de Claude, opera (Albert Cahen, 1896)
- Le Drac, opera (Paul and Lucien Hillemacher, 1896)
- Moïna, opera (Isidore de Lara, 1897)
- Le Spahi, opera (Lucien Lambert, 1897)
- Déjanire, tragedy, (incidental music by Camille Saint-Saëns, 1898)
- Lancelot, opera (Victorin de Joncières, 1900)
- Les Guelfes, opera (Benjamin Godard, 1902)
- Titania, opera (Georges Hüe, 1903)

=== Novels ===
- Les confidences d'un baiser
- Le Capitaine Satan
- Saltimbanques
- Le Petit Docteur

=== Travel notes ===
- Au pays des Cigaliers (1888)
- Fêtes cigalières et félibréennes (1891)

=== Others ===
- Notes d'un librettiste (1891)
- Guerre et Commune (1898)

== Bibliography ==
- Hervé, Lacombe (2002). "Autour de Louis Gallet—Profil d'une carrière de librettiste". Le livret d'opéra au temps de Massenet (in French). Publications de l'Université de Saint-Étienne. pp. 61–88. ISBN 2-86272-258-8.
