= Louise Janssen =

Danish-born French opera singer (1863–1938)

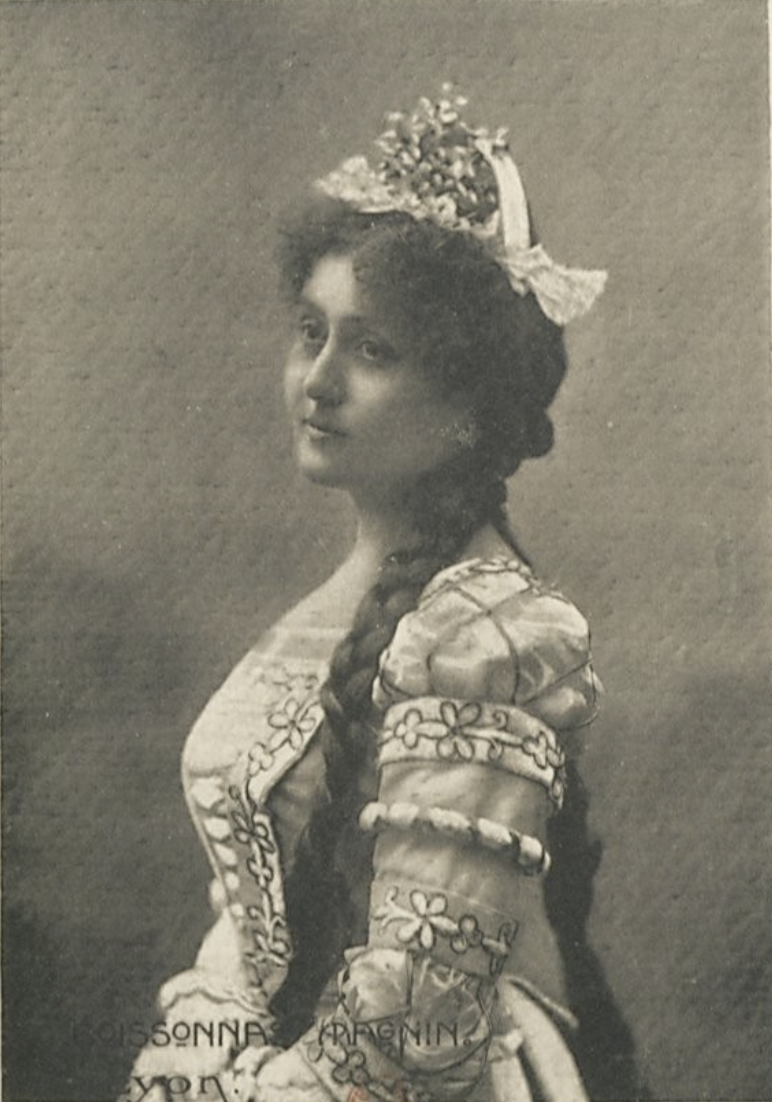
- Janssen as Eva in the first French Meistersinger in 1896
- Born: 5 October 1863; Sørbymagle near Slagelse, Denmark
- Died: 19 February 1938 (aged 74); Lyon, France
- Occupation: Operatic soprano
- Organization: Grand Théâtre de Lyon

Louise Amalie Janssen (5 October 1863 – 19 February 1938) was a Danish-born operatic soprano who spent most of her life in France. She is remembered for the many Wagnerian roles she sang principally at the Grand Théâtre de Lyon from 1890 to 1912, becoming known as Lyon's Wagnerian diva. The theatre was granted permission to hold the French premieres of some of Wagner's stage works, and she appeared there as the first Eva in Die Meistersinger von Nürnberg in 1896, and Brünnhilde in Götterdämmerung in 1903. In 1893, she took part in the premiere of the French version of Wagner's Die Walküre at the Paris Opera, as Siegrune. From 1906, she toured the United States and also sang in Monte-Carlo, but Lyon remained her centre where she taught voice and opera after her retirement in 1912.

== Early life and education ==
Born on 5 October 1863 in Sørbymagle near Slagelse, Janssen was the daughter of the cleric Carl Emil Janssen (1813–1884) and his wife, the diarist Sophie Frederikke née Luplau (1827–1895). She trained as a singer in Copenhagen, where she first performed, before moving to Austria where she was trained in piano and voice in Graz, returning later as a pupil of Amalie Materna in Vienna.

== Career ==
Janssen performed on stage at opera houses in France, most successfully at the Grand Théâtre de Lyon where she made her debut on 24 October 1890 as Marguerite in Gounod's Faust. She performed there in French premieres of Wagner's stage works which were performed in Lyon with permission from Cosima Wagner: as Eva in Die Meistersinger von Nürnberg in 1896, and as Brünnhilde in Götterdämmerung in 1903, part of the first complete Ring cycle in French. She also performed as Elsa in Lohengrin in 1891, Elisabeth in Tannhäuser in 1892, as Sieglinde in Die Walküre in 1895, and in the title role of Tristan und Isolde in 1900. She also appeared as Blanche de Sainte-Croix in Lalo's La jacquerie in 1895, as Chimène in Massenet's Le Cid.

In 1893, she performed at the Paris Opera as Siegrune in the French premiere of Die Walküre but she then broke off her contract in order to return to Lyon where, apart from an extensive tour of the United States in 1906 and several guest appearances in Monte-Carlo, she performed until her retirement in 1912. She remained in Lyon where she taught voice and opera to many pupils.

Louise Janssen died in Lyon on 24 February 1938.
