= Albert Cahen =

French composer (1846–1903)

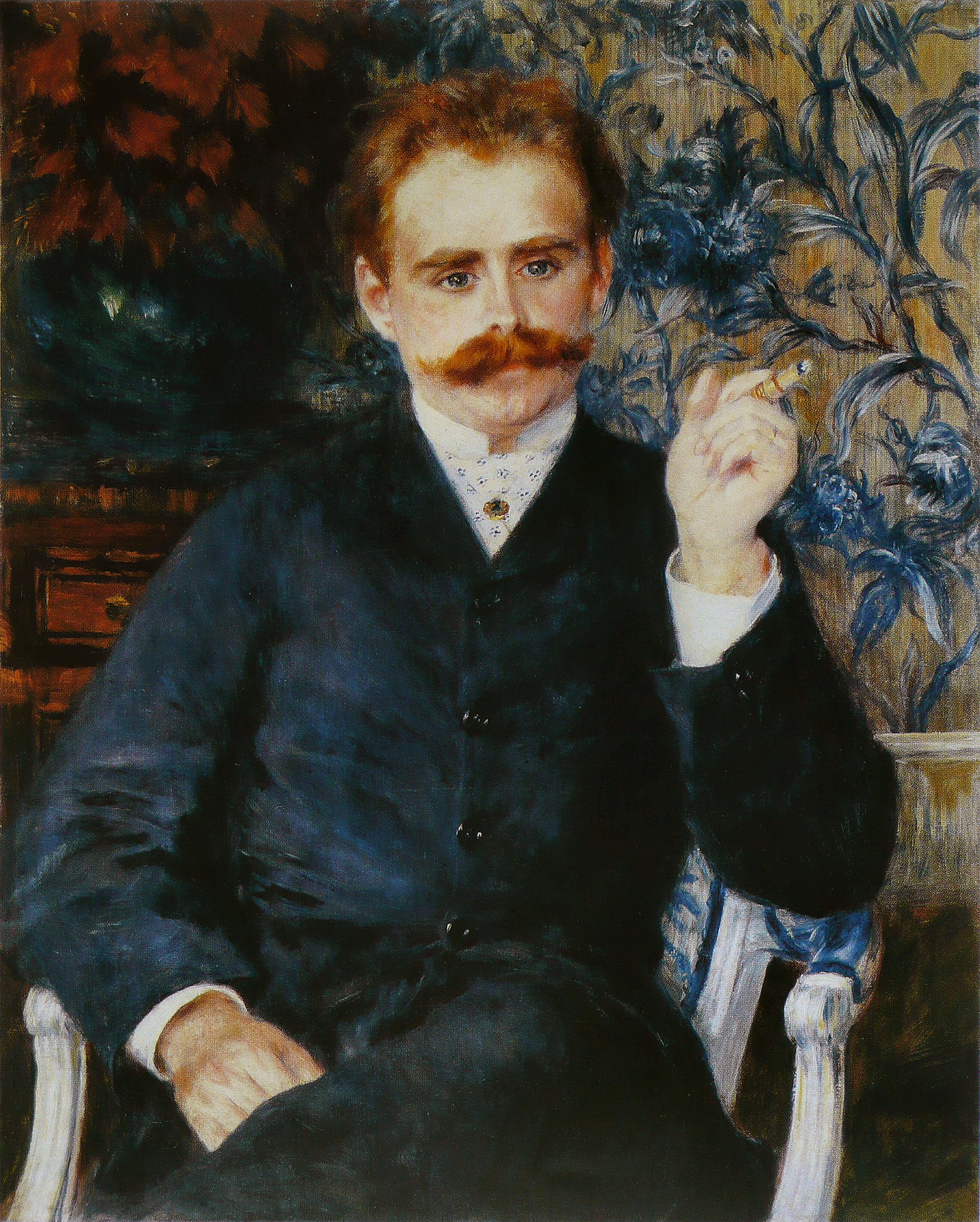
Composer Albert Cahen in a portrait by Auguste Renoir, 1881

Albert Cahen d'Anvers (8 January 1846 – 27 February 1903) was a French composer best known for light opera.

== Life ==
Born in Antwerp to a Belgian-Jewish banking family, Cahen was a pupil of César Franck (composition) and Mme. Szarvady (pianoforte). He enjoyed access to the elite social circles of his day, and made himself known to the musical world with the following compositions:

- Jean le précurseur, a biblical poem (1874)
- Le Bois, a comic opera (1880, Paris)
- Endymion, a mythological poem (1883, Paris)
- La Belle au bois dormant, a fairy operetta (1886, Geneva)
- Le Vénitien, a four-act opera (1890, Rouen)
- Fleur des neiges, ballet (1891)
- La Femme de Claude, a three-act lyric drama (1896, Paris)

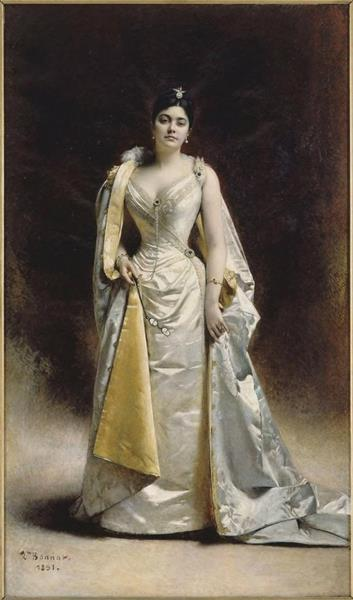
Portrait of Louise, Cahen d'Anvers, wife of Abert Cahen d'Anvers by Leon Bonnat

He died in La Turbie.
