= Iacob Lahovary =

Romanian general

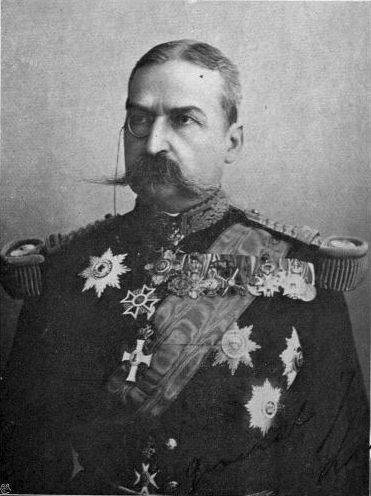

Minister of War of Kingdom of Romania
- In office 21 February 1891 – 22 February 1894
- Monarch: Carol I of Romania
- Preceded by: Matei Vlădescu
- Succeeded by: Lascăr Catargiu
- In office 11 April 1899 – 13 February 1901
- Preceded by: Anton Berindei
- Succeeded by: Dimitrie Sturdza

Minister of Foreign Affairs of Romania
- In office 22 December 1904 – 7 February 1907
- Preceded by: Ion I. C. Brătianu
- Succeeded by: Ioan Lahovary

Chief of the Romanian General Staff
- In office 1 October 1894 – 1 October 1895
- Prime Minister: Lascăr Catargiu
- Preceded by: Ștefan Fălcoianu
- Succeeded by: Constantin Barozzi

Personal details
- Born: 16 January 1846 Bucharest, Wallachia
- Died: 7 February 1907 (aged 61) Paris, France
- Resting place: Bellu Cemetery, Bucharest, Romania (1907–2008)
- Spouses: Elena Kretzulescu (div. 1883) Alexandrina Cantacuzino (m. 1883–1907)
- Children: Elena, Iacob, Leon
- Relatives: Alexandru Lahovary (brother); Ioan Lahovary (brother)
- Education: École Polytechnique; Sorbonne University
- Awards: Military Virtue Medal; Order of the Star of Romania; Order of Carol I

Military service
- Branch/service: Army
- Rank: General
- Battles/wars: Romanian War of Independence; Siege of Plevna

Iacob N. Lahovary (Romanian: Iacob N. Lahovari; 16 January 1846 – 7 February 1907) was a member of the Romanian aristocracy, a general, politician and diplomat who served as the Minister of War and Minister of Foreign Affairs of the Kingdom of Romania.

== Life and career ==
Iacob Lahovary was the brother of Alexandru Lahovary and Ioan Lahovary both of whom served as foreign ministers. He attended the Bucharest School of Officers from 1859 to 1864, École Polytechnique in Paris in 1864 to 1870. He also graduated from the Sorbonne University with a degree in mathematics in 1870. As soon as Lahovary entered military service, he quickly rose in the ranks of the Romanian Army: he became second lieutenant in 1864, lieutenant in 1870, captain in 1871, major in 1874, lieutenant colonel in 1877, colonel in 1883, brigadier general in 1891, and general in 1900.

During the Romanian War of Independence of 1877–1878, Lahovary fought at the battle of Vidin and at the Siege of Plevna. His awards include the War Medal of Military Virtue; the Order of the Star of Romania, Commander class; and the Order of Carol I, Grand Officer class.

His first wife was Elena Kretzulescu, with whom he had a daughter, Elena. Divorced in 1883, he remarried Alexandrina Cantacuzino, with whom he had two sons, Iacob and Leon.

He served as Minister of Foreign Affairs for a little more than two years before he died in February 1907 and was replaced by his brother Ioan Lahovary. Lahovary died in Paris of colon cancer. He was buried at Bellu Cemetery in Bucharest, in a tomb designed in 1905 by renowned architect Ion Mincu.

== Legacy ==
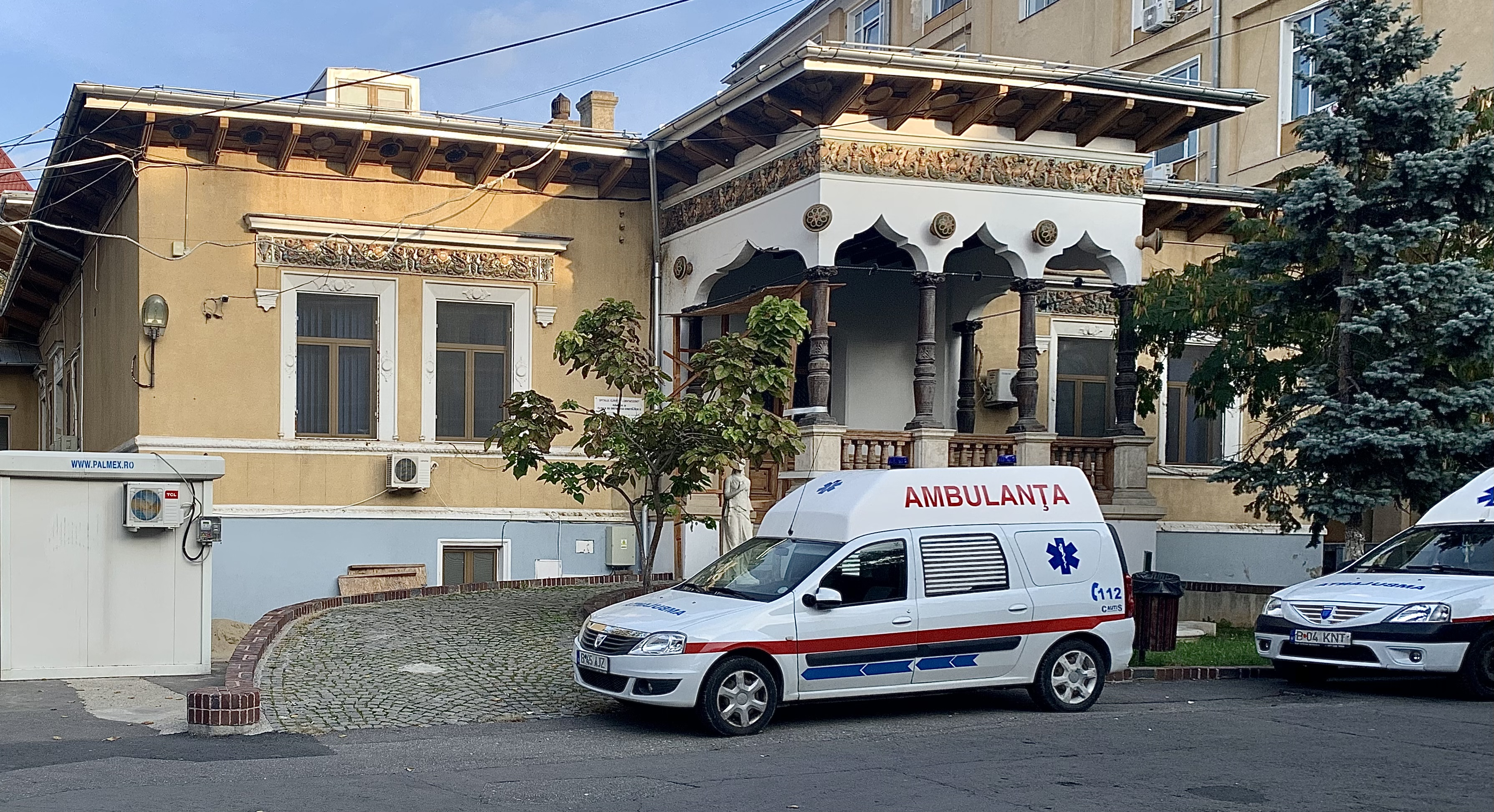
The Lahovary House in Bucharest

His resting place was vandalized in 1993, when his bust (the work of sculptor Oscar Späthe) was stolen. In 2008, Marian Vanghelie, the then-Mayor of Sector 5 of Bucharest, had Lahovary's remains removed, and his grandfather was buried there, instead.

A street in Galați is named after General Iacob Lahovary.

The Lahovary House was built by Ion Mincu between 1884 and 1886, at his request. Registered now as a historic monument, the house is considered to be one of the first significant Romanian Revival style buildings in the history of Romanian architecture.
