= Marie-Magdeleine =

Oratorio by Jules Massenet

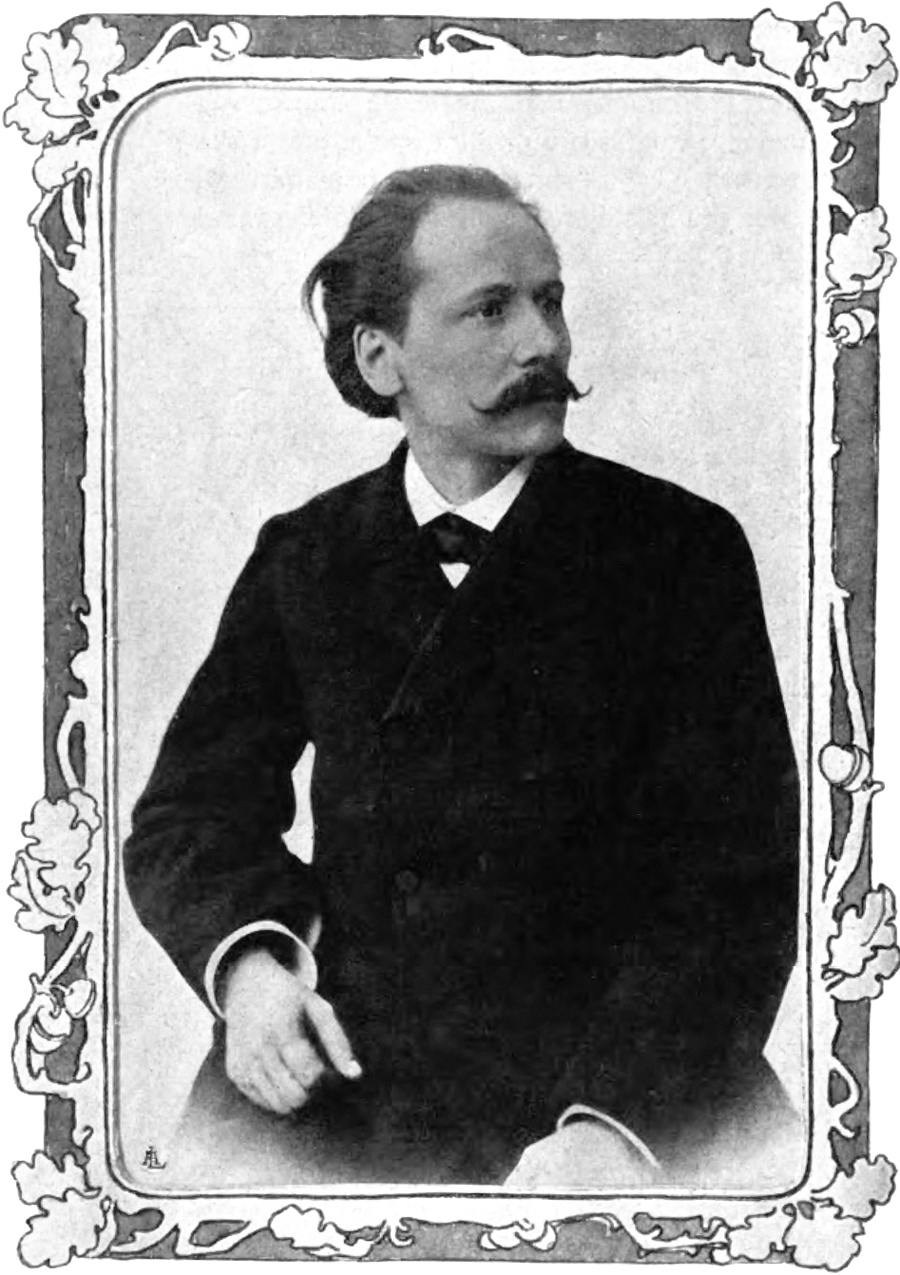
Jules Massenet in 1882

Marie-Magdeleine is an oratorio (Drame Sacré) in three acts and four parts by Jules Massenet to a French libretto by Louis Gallet. It was first performed at the Théâtre de l'Odéon in Paris on 11 April 1873, starring the famous contralto Pauline Viardot. The first staged performance took place in Nice on February 9, 1903. It was Massenet's first success and won him the praise of Tchaikovsky, Gounod, and Bizet.

The story concerns the last days of Jesus from the perspective of Mary Magdalene. The subject initially caused some controversy, as some believed that physical love was implied between Jesus and Mary Magdalene. From today's perspective, those implications are difficult to detect. While it contains some beautiful music and has been revived for certain singers, notably Régine Crespin, the work has not endured and is rarely performed.

== Principal characters ==
- Marie-Magdeleine (Méryem) – soprano
- Marthe – mezzo-soprano
- Jésus – tenor
- Judas – bass
