= Lapedatu =

Lapedatu is a Romanian surname. Notable people with the surname include:

- Alexandru Lapedatu (1876–1950), Romanian historian
- Ioan Alexandru Lapedatu (1844–1878), ethnic Romanian Austro-Hungarian poet and prose writer
- Ion Lapedatu (1876–1951), Romanian economist
