= Journal hijacking =

Predatory journal that impersonates an academic journal

Journal hijacking refers to the brandjacking of a legitimate academic journal by a malicious third party. Typically, the imposter journal sets up a fraudulent website for the purpose of offering scholars the opportunity to rapidly publish their research online for a fee. The term hijacked journal may refer to either the fraud or the legitimate journal. The fraudulent journals are also known as "clone journals". Similar hijacking can occur with academic conferences.

== Background ==
In 2012, cybercriminals began hijacking print-only journals by registering a domain name and creating a fake website under the title of the legitimate journals.

The first journal to be hijacked was the Swiss journal Archives des Sciences. In 2012 and 2013, more than 20 academic journals were hijacked. In some cases, scammers find their victims in conference proceedings, extracting authors' emails from papers and sending them fake calls for papers.

There have also been instances of journal hijacking wherein hijackers take over the journal's existing domain name after the journal publisher neglects to pay the domain name registration fees on time.

== List of hijacked journals ==
There are several hundred documented cases of journal hijackings, including:

- Academy of Management Annals
- Arctic
- Australian Journal of Herpetology
- Aut Aut
- Bothalia: African Biodiversity & Conservation
- British Journal of Canadian Studies
- Bulletin of Hispanic Studies
- Chelonian Conservation and Biology
- Comptes Rendus de l'Académie Bulgare des Sciences
- Entomologist's Gazette
- Epistemologia
- Iheringia
- International Journal of Central Banking
- International Journal of Multicultural Education
- Jökull
- Journal of Interdisciplinary Cycle Research
- Journal of Natural Products
- The Journal of Psychology
- Journal of Psychology & Theology
- Journal of Scientific Temper
- Journal of the IEST
- Journal of the West
- Journal of Vacuum Science and Technology
- Jundishapur Journal of Microbiology
- Levant
- Natural History
- The Nautilus
- Novy Mir
- Organization Development Journal
- Positif
- Pragmatics
- Preslia
- Research-Technology Management
- Salmagundi
- Scandia
- Social Evolution & History
- Specialusis Ugdymas
- Sylwan
- The Veliger
- Wulfenia
- Ymer

== See also ==
- Category:Hijacked journals
- Cybersquatting
- Confidence trick
- Passing off
- Predatory open access publishing

== Bibliography ==
- Jalalian, Mehrdad; Dadkhah, Mehdi (2015). "The full story of 90 hijacked journals from August 2011 to June 2015". Geographica Pannonica. 19 (2): 73–87. doi:10.5937/geopan1502073j. ISSN 0354-8724.
- Abalkina, Anna (21 June 2021). "Detecting a network of hijacked journals by its archive". Scientometrics. 126 (8): 7123–7148. arXiv:2101.01224. doi:10.1007/s11192-021-04056-0. ISSN 0138-9130. S2CID 230523913.
