= International Journal of Central Banking =

- Discipline: Economics
- Language: English
- Edited by: Christopher J. Waller

Publication details
- History: 2005–present
- Publisher: The Association of the International Journal of Central Banking (United States)
- Frequency: Quarterly

Standard abbreviations
- ISO 4: Int. J. Cent. Bank.

Indexing
- ISSN: 1815-4654 (print); 1815-7556 (web)
- LCCN: 2014207226
- OCLC no.: 60447457

Links
- Journal homepage

The International Journal of Central Banking (IJCB) is an open-access economic research journal that began publication in 2005 after the decision of several Central Banks to create a professional journal for policymakers and researchers in the field of monetary policy. In July 2004, the Bank for International Settlements (BIS), the European Central Bank, and each of the Group of Ten (G-10) central banks announced their plans to support the development of a new publication focused on central bank theory and practice. Other central banks were invited to participate in this joint project, and there are now some 50 sponsoring institutions.

The primary objectives of the IJCB are to widely disseminate the best policy-relevant and applied research on central banking and to promote communication among researchers both inside and outside of central banks.

Federal Reserve Vice Chairman Roger W. Ferguson Jr. first proposed the idea of such a journal and discussed the concept with several BIS colleagues and with Federal Reserve Board Governor Ben S. Bernanke, who served as the initial managing editor. John B. Taylor, Professor of Economics at Stanford University, was appointed managing editor in September 2005. Frank Smets of the European Central Bank became managing editor in January 2008. John Williams of the Federal Reserve Bank of San Francisco took over as managing editor in January 2011. Loretta J. Mester of the Federal Reserve Bank of Cleveland took over as managing editor in June 2016. Luc Laeven of the European Central Bank became managing editor in January 2020. Bank of England Chief Economist Charlie Bean strongly supported the project, and the journal's governing body, comprising representatives from the sponsoring institutions, was established. The current managing editor is Christopher J. Waller, from the board of governors of the Federal Reserve System.

Retraction Watch reports that the journal has been victim of hijacking, with the imposter website setup at https://ijocb.org/.

== Abstracting and indexing ==
The journal is indexed and abstracted in the following bibliographic databases:

- Business Source Ultimate
- EconLit
- Scopus
- Social Sciences Citation Index

According to Scopus, the journal has a 2024 CiteScore of 2.3, ranking 172th out of 317 journal in the category "Finance".

According to Raphael Auer, Giulio Cornelli and Christian Zimmermann, the journal is the most influential journal of economics published by policy institutions, followed by BIS Quarterly Review and IMF Economic Review.

== Annual conference ==
The journal organizes the Annual IJCB Research Conference, which focuses on a difference theme every year.

Theme	Host	Date
Assessing the Effectiveness of Monetary Policy during and after the COVID-19 Pandemic	Czech National Bank	23–24 June 2025
The Transmission of Monetary Policy in the Post-Pandemic World	Bank of Italy	24–25 June 2024
Global Supply Shocks, Trade Frictions, and Inflation	Central Bank of Ireland	22–23 June 2023
The New Financial Landscape for Central Banks	Bank of Canada	10–11 August 2022
The Macroeconomic Consequences of COVID-19	Bank of Korea and European Central Bank	9–10 August 2021
Structural changes in the financial system: new theory and evidence	Danmarks Nationalbank and European Central Bank	20–21 August 2020
Commodity Prices and Monetary Policy: New Theory and Evidence	Norges Bank	4–5 June 2019
Ten Years after the Global Financial Crisis: What Have We Learned about Ensuring Financial Stability	De Nederlandsche Bank	25–26 June 2018
The Interplay between Monetary Policy and Fiscal Policy	Czech National Bank	19–20 June 2017
Challenges to Financial Stability in a Low Interest Rate World	Federal Reserve Bank of San Francisco	21–22 November 2016
Challenges to Achieving Price Stability	Bank of Mexico	23–24 November 2015
Reflections on 25 Years of Inflation Targeting	Reserve Bank of New Zealand	1–3 December 2014
Policies for Macroeconomic and Financial Stability	Federal Reserve Bank of Philadelphia	26–27 September 2014
Inflation Targeting and Its Discontents	National Bank of Poland	6–7 September 2013
New Frameworks for Monetary Policy Analysis in an Era of Crises	Central Bank of Chile	27–28 September 2012
Financial Crises: Causes, Consequences and Policy Options	Hong Kong Monetary Authority	17–18 May 2012
Monetary Policy Issues in Open Economies	Bank of Canada	29–30 September 2011
The Real and Financial Effects of Basel III	Bank of England	26–27 May 2011
Monetary Policy Lessons from the Global Crisis	Bank of Japan	16–17 September 2010
The Theory and Practice of Macro-Prudential Regulation	Bank of Spain	17–18 June 2010
Monetary Policy Challenges in a Global Economy	Bank of France	24–25 September 2009
Provision and Pricing of Liquidity Insurance	Federal Reserve Bank of New York	11–12 June 2009

== Sponsoring institution ==
The journal is sponsored by over 50 central banks:

- Algeria
- Australia
- Belgium
- Brazil
- Canada
- China
- Columbia
- Czechia
- Denmark
- England
- Europe
- Finland
- France
- Germany
- Greece
- Hong Kong
- Iceland
- India
- Ireland
- Israel
- Italy
- Japan
- Korea
- Mexico
- Netherlands
- New Zealand
- Norway
- Philippines
- Poland
- Portugal
- Peru
- Romania
- Saudi Arabia
- Singapore
- Spain
- Sweden
- Switzerland
- Thailand
- Turkey
- United States Federal Reserve Board
  - Atlanta
  - Boston
  - Chicago
  - Cleveland
  - Dallas
  - Kansas City
  - Minneapolis
  - New York
  - Philadelphia
  - Richmond
  - San Francisco
  - St. Louis
- Bank for International Settlements
