= Ion Lapedatu =

Romanian finance minister

Ion Lapedatu Honorary Member of the Romanian Academy
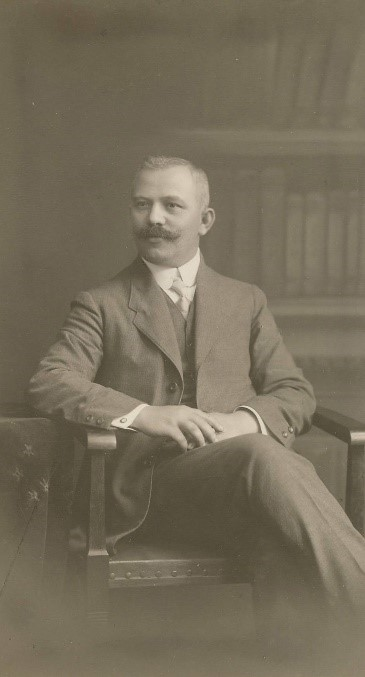

Minister of Finance
- In office 30 March 1926 – 19 March 1927
- Preceded by: Vintilă Brătianu
- Succeeded by: Alexandru Averescu

Governor of the National Bank of Romania
- In office 30 September 1944 – 14 March 1945
- Preceded by: Constantin Angelescu
- Succeeded by: Constantin Tătăranu

Personal details
- Born: September 14, 1876 Csernátfalu, Austria-Hungary (now Cernatul Săcelelor, Romania)
- Died: March 24, 1951 (aged 74) Bucharest, Romanian People's Republic

Ion Lapedatu (14 September 1876 – 24 March 1951) was finance minister of Romania (1926–1927), Governor of the National Bank of Romania (1944–1945), and honorary member of the Romanian Academy (since 1936).

== Family ==
Ion Lapedatu was the son of Ioan Alexandru Lapedatu, Ph.D. of the University of Brussels, Professor for classical languages at the Higher Greek-Orthodox Romanian College in Brassó (now, Andrei Șaguna National College, Brașov), Romanian poet, writer and journalist. He had a twin brother, Alexandru Lapedatu, historian, politician and President of the Romanian Academy. The twins became orphans when they were one and a half years old.

Lapedatu married Veturia Papp in March 1907; she was the daughter of the orthodox protopope from Belényes (now Beiuș, Romania). They had two children, a son (Ion, nicknamed Nelu, 1908-1929) and a daughter (Veturia, nicknamed Pica, 1916-2012).

== Education ==
Ion Lapedatu started primary school in 1883 in his hometown. He continued his primary studies in Brassó (Brașov), then finished it in the year 1888 in Iași, where his mother remarried after the death of his father. He then returned to Brassó, where he was admitted in the Higher Greek-Orthodox Romanian College, then continues his studies in Higher Commercial School in Brassó, obtaining his bachelor's degree "with distinction" in June 1898.

In the same year, he received scholarships from the Gojdu Foundation and from the Society "Transilvania" and was admitted to the Oriental Commercial Academy and the Law and Political Sciences School of the Budapest University and attended for the Seminar of higher commercial school professors. In 1900 – 1901 he was drafted and had to interrupt his studies. After his military service, he returned to Budapest, where he passed the fundamental examination in 1902; in 1904 he passed the specialty examination and obtained the Diploma of professor for higher commercial schools.

== Professional career ==
At the end of his studies at the Budapest University, Ion Lapedatu turned down a professor position in Buda preferring to return to Transylvania, where he accepted the position of second secretary at the "Transylvanian Association for Romanian Literature and the Culture of the Romanian People" (ASTRA) in Sibiu (1904–1905).

1906 he joined the "Ardeleana" bank in Szászváros (now, Orăștie) as secretary and then, after going through successive internships at banks in Nagyszeben (now, Sibiu), Kolozsvár (now, Cluj-Napoca), Budapest and Vienna, as director.

In 1911 Ion Lapedatu became director of the newly established "General Assurance Bank" (Banca Generală de Asigurare) in Sibiu.

On 1 January 1922 he was appointed Professor at the Chair for Public and Private Finances of the Academy for High Commercial Studies and Industry in Cluj, a position he held until 1938.

He had numerous appointments to various administrative councils, among which at the Albina Bank in Sibiu, at the Gojdu Foundation, and since 1925 at SONAMETAN, the national corporation established to exploit the methane gas deposits discovered in Transylvania, where he became Chairman.

From 1928 to 1944 he was director, then Vice-Governor and finally Governor of the National Bank of Romania (BNR).

== Political activity ==
Ion Lapedatu already showed his political talent as a student. In 1902, he was elected President of the Academic Society of Petru Maior, the society of the Romanian students in Budapest sustaining the Romanian language and culture through conferences, celebrations, debates, evocations of personalities. It also entertained a choir and a library and issued publications like the review "The Rose with Turns" and the "Society Almanac".

Lapedatu participated as representative of the Nocrich circumscription in the Great National Assembly of Alba Iulia that decided on 1 December 1918 the Union of Transylvania with Romania and was subsequently elected in the "Great National Council of Transylvania" (Marele sfat național din Transilvania). He received his first political appointment as general secretary of the finance department in the "Directory Council of Transylvania, Banat and the Romanian Counties in Hungary" (Consiliul Dirigent al Transilvaniei, Banatului și ţinuturilor românești din Ungaria). Among other contributions, he made the proposal to establish the "Agricultural Bank" (Banca Agrară), adopted by the Decree-Law No. 4167 of 12 September 1919.

Lapedatu was elected in the Arch-diocesan Synod in Sibiu (1909-1911; 1915-1917; 1918–1920), in the National Church Council (1917), and was a Council in the Senate of the arch-diocese (1912-1921) and since 1921 in the Metropolitan Council of Transylvania.

Between 1919 and 1931 he was repeatedly elected in the circumscriptions Nocrich and Crasna in the Romanian Parliament: four times as a member of the Chamber of Deputies, and twice as a member of the Senate.

Lapedatu joined early the Romanian National Party in Transilvania and Banat (Partidul Național Român din Ardeal). He left it in 1926 together with Vasile Goldiș and Ioan Lupaș before its merger with the Peasants' Party (Partidul Țărănesc) when he became Finance Minister in the Government of Alexandru Averescu (1926-1927).

"The Goldiș group" tried to launch the National Party of Transylvania, but it did not survive. After 1927, he did not participate in any other political party.

== Development of loan and insurance institutions in Transylvania ==
Lapedatu played the central role in the institutionalization of the "Conference of the Directors of the Romanian Loan Institutions" (Conferința directorilor institutelor românești de credit) initiated by Dr. Cornel Diaconovici in 1898, a model also adopted by the Hungarian and Saxon institutions in 1903 and by the Austrian and Czech ones in 1905.

He was elected in 1906 secretary of the "Romanian Banks Delegation" (Delegațiunea băncilor române) acting in between conferences; in this position he drove the development of the initiative from a consultative to an executive role. He elaborated the statutes of the future "Solidaritatea" Association in compliance with the Hungarian financial law in effect at that time, enrolled the support required for having it registered and approved in 1907; he became its secretary. Under his leadership, "Solidaritatea" functioned like a de facto "economic council" of the Romanian population in Transylvania. It was successful in imposing mandatory external controls through experts approved by "Solidaritatea"; this made redundant the control through Government experts, avoiding thereby potential tensions between the policy of consolidation of a centralized Hungarian nation state and the aspirations for self-determination of its ethnic minorities.

Lapedatu is credited as the founder of the insurance system for the Romanians in Transylvania. He authored the "Theory of the Life Insurance" published in 1902 in Brașov, the first work on this topic in Romanian in Transylvania. He embraced the idea of a Romanian insurance bank launched at the Conference of the Directors and, in his quality as secretary of "Solidaritatea", launched an appeal in the conference of 27 September 1909, elaborated the feasibility study, advocated the initiative both with potential participants and with the authorities, and published "clarifications" in the "Economic Review", explaining that the Romanian population was not able to meet the conditions imposed by the institutions already existent in Transylvania, and in particular in Sibiu, either founded locally by Saxons or Hungarians, or established as branches of insurance companies from Austria, Germany, Italy or France. Ion I. Lapedatu prepared the foundation documents, ran the successful subscription campaign, and obtained all necessary approvals. The "General Assurance Bank" has been established on 14 May 1911. He was appointed general director, later chairman, and led it to become one of the most important insurance institutions in the united Romania, changing its name first in "Romania", then in "Prima Ardeleană".

== International missions ==
Lapedatu was a delegate of Romania to the Brussels Financial Conference, 1920. He was nominated president and appointed by the members of the "Liquidation Commission in Budapest" (Comisiunii de Lichidare la Budapesta) in March 1920, in order to close open public and private issues between Hungary and Romania, and between their citizens that arose from the integration of Transylvania into Romania. In March 1921, the Commission was transformed into the "Romanian Financial and Economic Mission to Budapest" (Romanian: Misiunea Financiară și Economică la Budapesta); it was closed in May 1922, and the issues were solved in the subsequent "Bucharest Romanian-Hungarian Conference" (Conferința româno-ungară de la București) in 1923-1924, at which he participated as a member of the Romanian delegation.

Upon a request from the Ministry of External Affairs, he interrupted in November 1921 his mission to Budapest for a few weeks in order to join the Romanian delegation at the "Paris Reparations Commission" addressing the partition of the Austrian-Hungarian public debt.

In 1922 he was a member of the Romanian delegation in the Conference of the Successor States of the Former Habsburg monarchy in Rome, mandated to solve together with the Austrian and Hungarian representatives the issues arising from the peace treaties. In 1925 he also participated in the second Conference of the Successor States that took place in Prague.

In 1927-1928, Lapedatu assumed a leadership role in the plenipotentiary commission that negotiated in Berlin the closure of the financial disputes with Germany; he proposed the final version of the document, and signed the convention to end all financial contentious issues between Germany and Romania. It was ratified by the Rumanian Parliament on December 28, 1928, and promulgated on January 1, 1929; it was ratified by the German Reichstag on February 8, 1929. This Convention represents the first economic treaty between Germany and Romania in history, replacing the Treaty of Versailles as basis for the relationships between the two states. It also allowed Romania to obtain external loans for currency stabilisation.

In 1930, Lapedatu was elected as President of the Romanian delegation to address the question of the Gojdu Foundation, following the agreement between the Ministries of External Affairs of Romania and Hungary; he reached an amiable solution in 1936, ratified on 5 May 1938 by King Carol II of Romania and on 20 June 1940 by Regent Miklós Horthy of Hungary; it could not be enforced in the aftermath of the Second Vienna Award, and as of 2026 the issue is still open.

He participated as the representative of the National Bank of Romania in the four "Conferences of the Emission Banks of the Little Entente between Czechoslovakia, Yugoslavia and Romania in Bucharest (1934), Belgrade (1936), Prague (1936) and again Bucharest (1937); the activities have been interrupted 1938 by the German occupation of Czechoslovakia. In 1936 he participated as a member of the Romanian delegation in the first "Conference of the Emission Banks of the Balkan Entente" bringing together Romania, Yugoslavia, Greece and Turkey in Athens, and in 1937 he participated in the same capacity in the second conference in Ankara.

== Publishing, cultural and social activities ==
Ion Lapedatu started publishing in his college years, 1897 in Gazeta de Transilvania, and 1898 in Telegraful Român.

As a student he was among the founders of the Luceafărul magazine in Budapest in 1902, and he was a member of the redaction committee since inception together with Octavian Goga, Ioan Lupaș, Octavian C. Tăslăuanu, continuing in this capacity between the years 1906 – 1920 when the magazine was published bi-monthly in Sibiu.

He had an intensive publishing activity in his specialty. He started his long lasting collaboration with the Revista Economică ("Economic Magazine") in 1904 with the first article of a series on accounting; he became its director in 1906.

Ion Lapedatu published 18 books, 2 monographs, 298 studies, notes, general economic analyses and reports, 20 papers, 13 speeches on economic, social and political subjects.

He was elected honorary member of the Romanian Academy in 1936. In August 1948 he was purged by the communist regime and reinstated post-mortem in July 1990.

Ion Lapedatu had a passion for hiking; he was for more than 20 years an active member of the "Siebenbürgischer Karpathen Verein", the hiking association of the Saxons in Brașov. He was also a member in the "Turing Club of Romania", in "Admir", in the Hungarian "Brașov Touring Association", and in the "Enczian" society of the young Hungarian hand workers in Brașov; in addition, he was long time President of the Cultural and Sportive Association of BNR Employees, he described his ideas and his experience in the inaugural speech delivered at the opening of the BNR Chalet at Diham in 1945.

== Philanthropic work ==
In all his functions. Ion Lapedatu provided significant financial means to support artists, national schools and churches, among which the Administration of the Central Romanian Orthodox Schools (Romanian: Eforia Școalelor Centrale Ortodoxe Române) in Brașov, the Central High Commercial School in Brașov, the orthodox cathedral in Orăștie, the monument of WWI heroes in Săcele, the restoration of patrimony monuments including the monasteries Curtea de Argeș and Aninoasa, and the Golești architectural complex.

Ion Lapedatu was elected together with Valeriu Braniște, Ioan Lupaș, Octavian Goga and Ion Agârbiceanu in the administration council of the "Foundation for the Support of Romanian Journalists" established by Dr. Ioan Mihu in 1911. He assumed the task of collecting funds, and complemented contributions from significant donors with a "greetings fund" in which small contributions could be made instead of sending cards or gifts: the Foundation published the donation to inform the addressees of the greetings. In 1918, as Ion Lapedatu stopped his activity to dedicate his time and energy to the integration of Transylvania in the united Romania, the Foundation and its patrimony were transferred to the "Trade Union of Transylvanian Journalists".

On 14 September 1939 Ion Lapedatu registered the "Establishment Veturia I. Lapedatu" (Așezământul Veturia I. Lapedatu), a charitable institution for retired intellectuals with limited financial means and for meritorious students; the founding act put it under the Romanian Orthodox Archbishop of Alba Iulia and Sibiu. Ion Lapedatu contributed almost one third of the starting financial contributions, that included donations from sponsors and further contributions from former beneficiaries of the "Students’ Table" in Sibiu funded by the Albina bank that has been directed for several years by Veturia I. Lapedatu; in 1948, the patrimony of the Establishment was nationalized and its financial means lost their value following the 1947 monetary revaluation.

== Awards ==
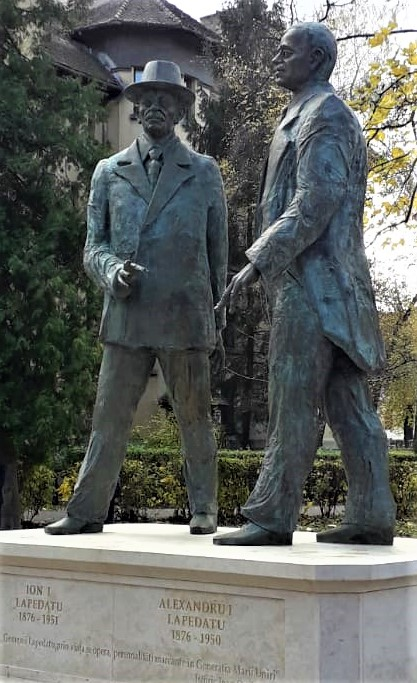
Double Monument Lapedatu Twins in Brașov

- Comandor of the "Order of the Crown" (Coroana României), 1921
- Grand cross with sash of the "Order of the Crown", 1927
- Grand cross of the "Order of the White Lion", Czechoslovakia, 1936

== Death ==
In 1945 Ion Lapedatu was dismissed from the National Bank of Romania at the installation of the Petru Groza cabinet in March 1945. His pensions as Bank Governor and University professor were cut under the pretext that he had revenues from his properties; however between 1945 and 1948 all his properties were nationalized, therefore, left without any means, he lived with his daughter's family.

After a bus accident from 1947, he was immobilized in bed; for this reason he was not arrested in the night of 5/6 May 1950 in the so-called "group of dignitaries", like his brother Alexandru, although he was under investigation by the Securitate.

He died on 24 March 1951 in Bucharest, after long suffering. He is buried in the Groaveri Cemetery in Brașov.

== Legacy ==
Ion Lapedatu has his name on plaques on the natal house in Săcele, in the National College Andrei Șaguna, and on the National Bank of Romania – Sibiu Agency.

The conference hall of the National Bank of Romania, Regional Branch Cluj, is named after him.

His portrait hangs in the Governor's Gallery in the National Bank of Romania. The Bank issued in 2016 a coin series commemorating three Governors, Ion I. Câmpineanu, Mihail Manoilescu, and Ion Lapedatu.

Babeș-Bolyai University in Cluj-Napoca organizes the "Ion I. Lapedatu" Symposium of Banking History and Civilization.

A double monument for "Lapedatu Twins - Outstanding Personalities in the Generation of the Great Union. Alexandru I. Lapedatu (1876-1950), Ion. I. Lapedatu (1876-1951)" has been inaugurated on November 8, 2019, in Brașov.
