= International reserves of the National Bank of Romania =

International reserves of the National Bank of Romania at end-November 2007, foreign exchange reserves of the National Bank of Romania amounted to EUR 25,441 million.

The EUR 230 million increase in the month under review owed to the following: EUR 641.4 million worth of inflows comprising incomes from international reserve management (including the rise in the market value of foreign bonds held with the National Bank of Romania), change in the foreign-exchange reserve requirements of commercial banks, a.s.o. EUR 411.4 million worth of outflows consisting of principal repayments and interest payments on public and publicly guaranteed external debt, the change in foreign-exchange reserve requirements of commercial banks, a.s.o. The gold stock stayed at 103.7 tonnes. However, following the developments in the world price of gold, its value dropped to EUR 1,792.98 million; as a result, the international reserves of the National Bank of Romania (foreign exchange and gold) stood at EUR 27.23 billion.

By end-2007, payments due on public and publicly guaranteed external debt amount to EUR 129 million.
