= Mihail C. Suțu =

Romanian historian

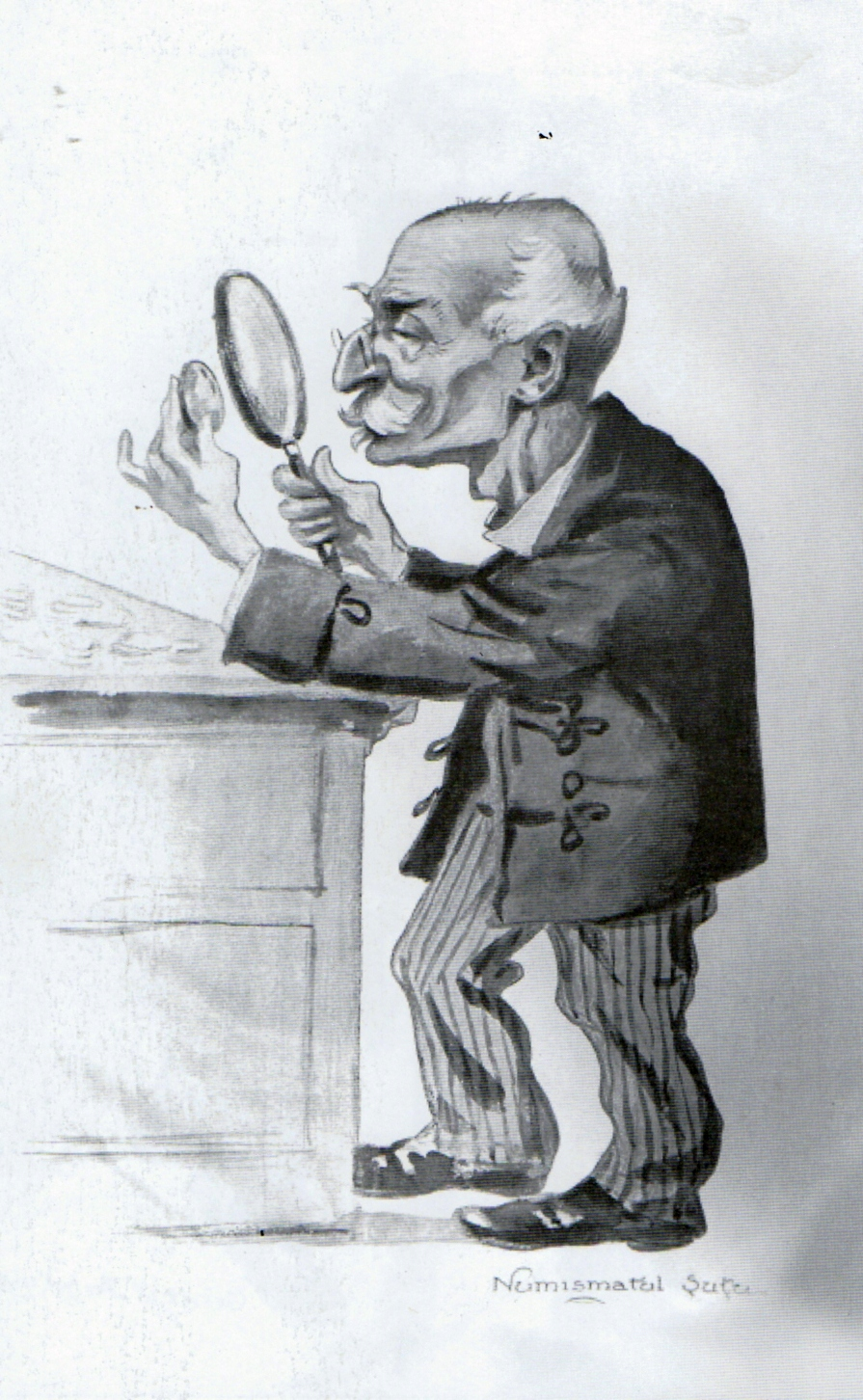
A 1913 caricature of Suțu the numismatist, by Nicolae Petrescu-Găină

Mihail C. Suțu (February 15, 1841–July 9, 1933), also known as Michel C. Soutzo or Soutzos, was a Romanian historian, numismatist and central banker.

== Life ==
Born in Bucharest as a member of the noble Soutzos family, he attended the École Centrale des Arts et Manufactures in Paris, graduating with an engineer's degree in 1864. Early in his career, he was a civil servant within the Agriculture and Domains Ministry. From 1881 to 1891, he was general director of Poșta Română, and from 1892 to 1894, he was a director at the National Bank of Romania. Following that, he was an adviser with the Court of Accounts.

From November 1899 to December 1904, he served as Governor of the National Bank. As such, he conducted negotiations with the Finance Ministry that led to a convention that modified the bank's statute and withdrew the government's share from its capital. He supported popular banks and worked to extend the central bank's presence around the country, endowing its branched with suitable buildings. His term coincided with a financial crisis that lasted from 1900 to 1901, and saw him clash with Prime Minister Petre P. Carp about how to help resolve the issue.

In 1903, he became the first president of the Romanian Numismatic Society. Elected a corresponding member of the Romanian Academy in 1884, he rose to titular status in 1909. From 1914 until his death, Suțu headed the academy's numismatic collection. He conducted systematic and scientific research into coinage, becoming among Southeastern Europe's most prominent experts in the field. He began by building a collection of Greco-Roman coins and antiquities, later commencing research. He studied ancient metrology, in particular the weight systems of Egypt, Chaldea, Asia Minor, Greece and Italy, expressing original perspectives about these topics.

== Works ==
He published studies of the weights used in the Greek colonies of Histria, Tomis and Callatis. In all, he wrote some forty works on ancient numismatics and metrology. Suțu donated his collection to the academy and the Dobruja Regional Museum.

== See also ==
- His portrait at the Romanian Wikipedia
