= The Old Army in Texas =

2000 history book about the US Army in Texas from 1849 to 1881

The Old Army in Texas: A Research Guide to the U.S. Army in Nineteenth-Century Texas
- Author: Thomas T. Smith
- Language: English
- Subject: Non-fiction
- Publisher: Texas State Historical Association (first edition); Texas A&M University Press (second edition)
- Publication date: 2000, 2020
- Publication place: United States
- Pages: 255 (2000); 264 (2020)
- ISBN: 978-1-62511-060-2

The Old Army in Texas: A Research Guide to the U.S. Army in Nineteenth-Century Texas is a 2000 military history book by Thomas T. Smith about the United States Army in Texas during the 19th century. The book was published by the Texas State Historical Association. The book received a second edition published by Texas A&M University Press in 2020.

== Content ==
The Old Army in Texas is made up of six parts, which follow a series of maps of the military frontier in Texas from 1849 to 1881 and an introduction. The first part of the book is an updated version of an article Smith wrote in 1996 for the Southwestern Historical Quarterly analyzing combat operations by the US Army in Texas against indigenous nations. The second part lists the different versions of the military department of Texas, its commanders, and the location of its headquarters. The third part is a dictionary of about 300 US Army posts in Texas. The fourth part of the book is a list of US Army regiments stationed at each post and their commanding for every year from 1849 to 1881. The fifth part is a summary of all 249 violent confrontations between the US Army and the indigenous nations of Texas in the same time period. The sixth part is a bibliography of books, articles, archives, and other resources for the study of Texas military history.

== Reception ==
Paul H. Carlson, reviewing The Old Army in Texas for the New Mexico Historical Review, called the book a "handy aid and useful compendium" and noted its "concise", "surgically sterile" style. Durwood Ball, editor for the New Mexico Historical Review, called The Old Army in Texas a "superb study" in his own review of the book for The Journal of Military History. Historian Allan O. Kownslar, writing for the Journal of the West, said that the book "should allow future scholars to research in more depth ... that 32-year period that led to [the] development of an agricultural empire in West Texas." Michael D. Pierce, writing for The Journal of Southern History, called the book "a very useful beginning point for reference and research".

== Editions ==
The second edition of The Old Army in Texas was published by Texas A&M University Press on October 15, 2020, with a foreword by historian Robert A. Wooster.

== Sources ==
- Ball, Durwood (October 2001). "The Old Army in Texas: A Research Guide to the U.S. Army in Nineteenth-Century Texas". The Journal of Military History. 65 (4): 1107–1108. ISSN 0899-3718.
- Carlson, P. H. (2002). "The Old Army in Texas: A Research Guide to the U.S. Army in Nineteenth-Century Texas". New Mexico Historical Review. 77 (2): 217–218. ISSN 0028-6206.
- Kownslar, Allan O. (2002). "THE OLD ARMY IN TEXAS: A Research Guide to the U.S. Army in Nineteenth-Century Texas". Journal of the West. 14 (1): 104. ISSN 0022-5169.
- Pierce, Michael D. (November 2001). "The Old Army in Texas: A Research Guide to the U.S. Army in Nineteenth-Century Texas". The Journal of Southern History. 67 (4): 919. ISSN 0022-4642.
- Smith, Thomas T. (2020). The Old Army in Texas: A Research Guide to the U.S. Army in Nineteenth-Century Texas (Second ed.). Texas State Historical Association. ISBN 978-1-62511-060-2.
