= Mihail Oromolu =

Romanian politician

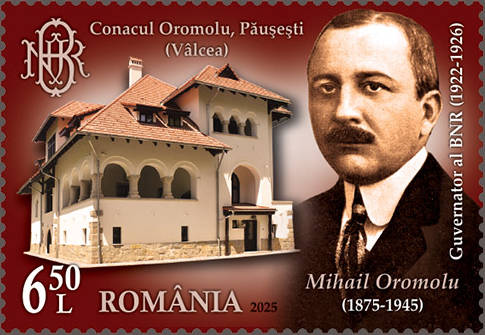
Oromolu on a 2025 stamp of Romania

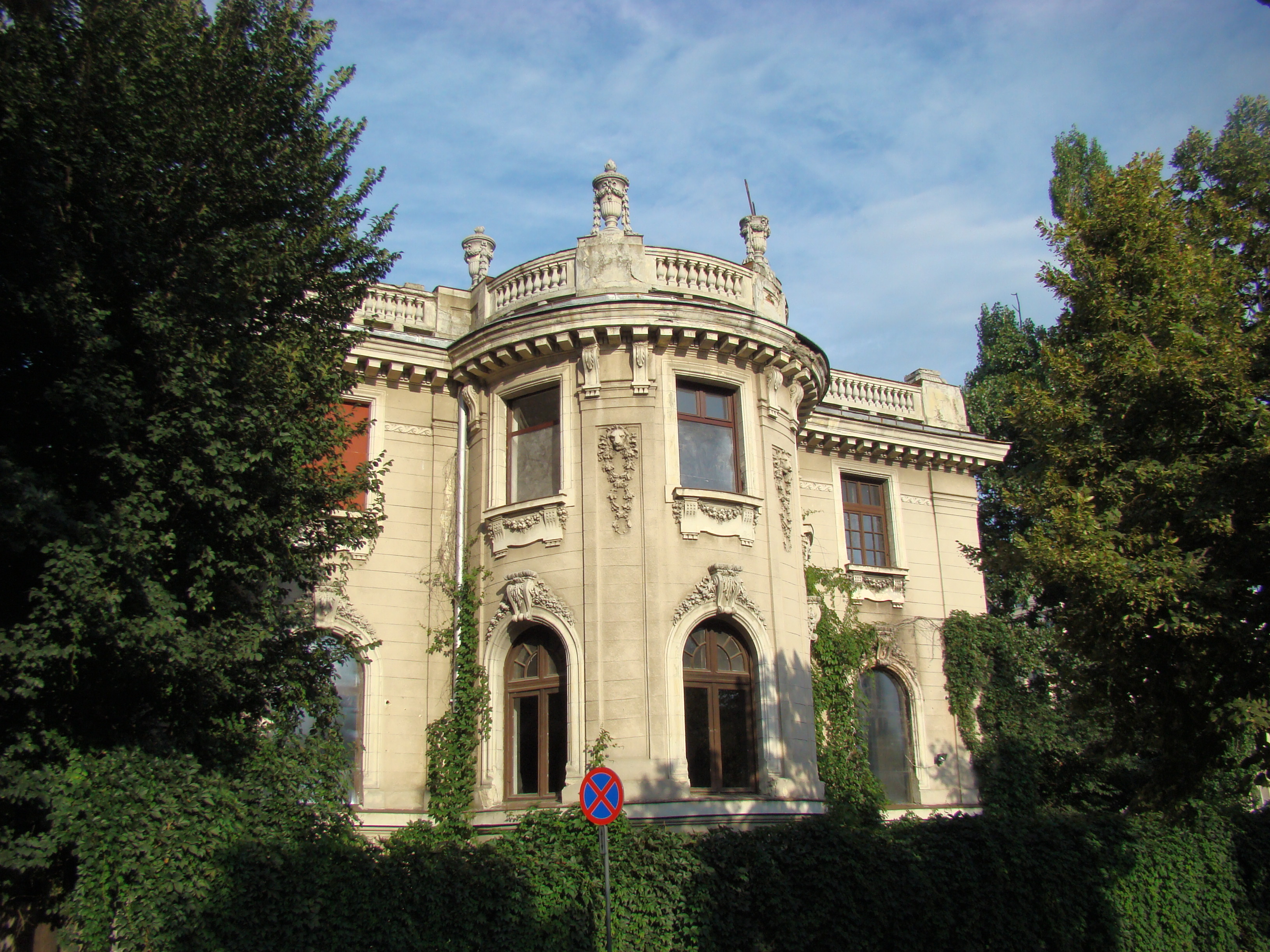
Oromolu's house in Bucharest

Mihail Oromolu (6 February 1875 – 29 March 1945) was a Romanian magistrate and politician.

Born in Râmnicu Vâlcea, he attended Saint Sava National College in Bucharest, followed by the University of Bucharest. He received a law degree from the University of Paris, and also studied literature and philosophy at the Ludwig-Maximilians-Universität München. Oromolu entered the magistracy in 1900 as a judge's assistant and substitute at Pitești, Târgoviște, Buzău, Constanța and Brăila. He served as magistrate at Craiova in 1903 and became state's attorney in 1904. From 1912 to 1913, he was prefect of Dolj County.

Oromolu entered political life in the Conservative Party (PC), and was both deputy and senator from 1914 to 1938. In 1918, upon the PC's dissolution, he entered the Conservative-Democratic Party (PCD). From December 1921 to January 1922, when this party was in government, he served as Minister of Industry and Commerce. When the PCD subsequently collapsed, Oromolu joined the National Liberal Party, serving as head of its Dolj County chapter during the interwar period.

From 1922 to 1926, he was Governor of the National Bank of Romania. He was later a member of Creditul Industrial institution, in which capacity he supported industrial development in his native Oltenia. In 1937, he joined the Higher Agricultural Council. In June 1940, he signed the memorandum written by Nicolae Iorga that urged Romania fight rather than accede to the ultimatum that forced the Soviet occupation of Bessarabia and Northern Bukovina. During World War II, he headed Amicii Americii and promoted the interests of the United States.

In 1922, Oromolu helped found Scrisul Românesc publishing house in Craiova, and financed the publication of several novels. A cultured man, he was a supporter of artists and writers. He was made a commander of the Legion of Honour and a grand cross of the Order of the Crown.
