= ABC-Clio =

American educational book publisher, founded 1955

ABC-Clio, LLC
- Parent company: Bloomsbury Publishing
- Status: Active
- Founded: 1955
- Founder: Eric Boehm
- Headquarters location: Santa Barbara, California
- Distribution: self-distributed (US); Edu Reference Publishers Direct (Canada); Ontario Library Association (Libraries Unlimited, Canada); Co Info (Australia); Inbooks (Libraries Unlimited, Australia); Marston Book Services (UK)
- Key people: Ron Boehm (CEO); Becky Snyder (President)
- Publication types: Books, databases, magazines, journals
- Nonfiction topics: History, social sciences
- Imprints: ABC-Clio; Greenwood Press; Praeger; Libraries Unlimited; Linworth
- Official website: www.abc-clio.com

ABC-Clio, LLC (stylized ABC-CLIO) is an American publishing company for academic reference works and periodicals primarily on topics such as history and social sciences for educational and public library settings. Since 2021, ABC-Clio and its suite of imprints are collectively imprints of British publishing house Bloomsbury Publishing.

ABC-Clio provides service to fifteen different online databases which contain over one million online textbooks. The company consults academic leaders in the fields they cover in order to provide authority for their reference titles. The headquarters are located in Santa Barbara, California.

== History ==
ABC-Clio was founded in 1955 as a privately held corporation by Eric Boehm with its first publication, Historical Abstracts. The name represents the company's two original divisions when it incorporated in 1969: ABC stands for American Bibliographical Center and Clio Press is named after Clio, the muse of history from ancient Greek mythology. According to Boehm, he had always been interested in history so when he noticed that there were not many good historical abstracting services available, he started publishing the Historical Abstracts.

During the 1960s, a sister bibliographic and abstract publication on American history was added, America: History and Life, which was considered an award-winning title. The company entered into digital publishing with electronic data in the 1960s and in 1975, it published its first online database called DIALOG. During the 1980s, ABC-Clio expanded into providing primary reference books such as encyclopedias and dictionaries and stopped publishing bibliographic books.

In the 1990s, ABC-Clio began to provide access to its humanities database on CD-ROM. The Exegy Current Events CD-ROM was named "Best Disc of the Year" by Library Journal. In 1998, ABC-Clio provided electronic access to America: History and Life. By the 2000s, one of the company's most popular products had become online databases for researching many topics in the field of the humanities. In 2001, ABC-Clio began to publish eBooks, initially providing 150 different titles to schools and libraries. The company's reference books had won numerous awards, and the company started a series of subject-related online databases for secondary school use. In 2004, the company acquired the quarterly historical journal, Journal of the West, which has been published since 1962.

In 1996, ABC-Clio merged with an electronic publishing company, Intellimation, which also produced educational software. The merger brought Becky Snyder, who by 2009 had become ABC-Clio's president, from Intellimation. In 2007, it sold two databases – Historical Abstracts and America: History and Life – to EBSCO Publishing; in addition, the companies also agreed a partnership through which nine additional ABC-Clio databases would be distributed through EBSCO Publishing.

In December 2021, Bloomsbury Publishing acquired ABC-Clio for US$22.9 million (equivalent to $26.1 million in 2024).

== Subsidiaries ==
- Intellimation
- Linworth Publishing, Inc.: On March 18, 2009, Libraries Unlimited announced the acquisition of Linworth Publishing, with partnership becoming effective immediately.
- Journal of the West

=== Imprints and series ===
==== ABC-Clio/Greenwood ====
In 2008, ABC-Clio acquired the Greenwood Publishing Group from Houghton Mifflin Harcourt. The deal gave ABC-Clio a "perpetual license" to use the imprints of Greenwood Press and publish all of its titles. Acquiring the publishing group gave ABC-Clio access to Greenwood Press, Praeger Publishers, Praeger Security International, and Libraries Unlimited. Greenwood focuses on publishing full-text reference works which are authoritative on various topics.

==== Libraries Unlimited ====
Libraries Unlimited came to ABC-Clio as part of a deal with Greenwood Press. In 2012, Kathyrn Suárez was named publisher for this division, which focuses on publishing for librarians and information professionals.

==== ABC-Clio Solutions ====
ABC-Clio databases are provided under the umbrella of ABC-Clio Solutions. There are fifteen different databases providing access to different subject areas. ABC-Clio Solutions provides digital curriculum with multimedia content, text-to-speech features, translation tools which covers various topics relating to history and the humanities. After ABC-Clio acquired Greenwood Press's databases, they revamped the look and feel of their interface in order to provide common access through the ABC-Clio interface. ABC-Clio also provided the ability to search across multiple databases through one search, also providing options for narrowing the search after revamping their interface. The new interface is considered user-friendly and provides access to personalized features.

==== Praeger Publishing ====
In 1950, American Frederick A. Praeger founded Frederick A. Praeger, Inc. Originally publishing books by disillusioned former Communists who had fled from behind the Iron Curtain, the publishing house became known for publishing "scholarly and professional books" in the subject areas of social sciences and the humanities.

In 1966, Praeger sold his firm to William B. Benton, an American senator and publisher and the chairman of Encyclopaedia Britannica. In 1976, it was sold to CBS, which had shortened the name to Praeger Publishing before selling it to Greenwood Press, Inc., in 1986.

When the renamed Greenwood Publishing Group (GPG) was acquired by ABC-Clio in 2009, Praeger Publishing became a standalone imprint of ABC-Clio, and remained such when, in December 2021, Bloomsbury Publishing bought ABC-Clio.
