= Hepatitis Monthly =

- Discipline: Gastroenterology, hepatology
- Language: English
- Edited by: Seyed-Moayed Alavian

Publication details
- History: 2002–present
- Publisher: Brieflands Publishing (fka Kowsar Publishing)
- Frequency: Monthly
- Open access: Yes
- License: CC-BY-NC 4.0
- Impact factor: 1.578 (2018)

Standard abbreviations
- ISO 4: Hepat. Mon.

Indexing
- CODEN: HMEOBM
- ISSN: 1735-143X (print); 1735-3408 (web)
- OCLC no.: 1076732860

Links
- Journal homepage; Online access; Online archive

Hepatitis Monthly is a monthly peer-reviewed open access medical journal published by Brieflands Publishing, formerly known as Kowsar Publishing. Kowsar was included on Beall's List prior to the list's shutdown in 2017. The journal was established in 2002 by Seyed-Moayed Alavian, who is the journal's editor-in-chief.

== Abstracting and indexing ==
The journal is abstracted and indexed in CAB Abstracts, CINAHL, EBSCO databases, Embase, Science Citation Index Expanded, and Scopus. According to the Journal Citation Reports, the journal has a 2018 impact factor of 1.578.

In August 2017, the United States National Library of Medicine, which manages the PubMed Central database, determined that the journal did not satisfy their Scientific Quality Standard, and delisted the journal.
