= Wulfenia (journal) =

- Discipline: Botany
- Language: English
- Edited by: Roland K. Eberwein

Publication details
- History: 1994-2022
- Publisher: Regional Museum of Carinthia (Austria)
- Frequency: Annually

Standard abbreviations
- ISO 4: Wulfenia

Indexing
- ISSN: 1561-882X
- OCLC no.: 311991108

Links
- Journal homepage; Online archives

Wulfenia: Mitteilungen des Kärntner Botanikzentrums is a print-only peer-reviewed scientific journal of botany published by the Regional Museum of Carinthia. It was established in 1998 and the editor-in-chief is Roland K. Eberwein (Carinthian Botanic Center).

The journal published its last volume in 2022 and has ceased publication.

== Scam ==
Wulfenia journal is one of the first hijacked journals. The journal was the subject of an online scam, with fake web addresses such as www.wulfeniajournal.at, www.wulfeniajournal.com, and www.multidisciplinarywulfenia.org illegally re-posting copies of the original journal articles and inviting scientists to pay large fees before their works are considered for "publication".

== Abstracting and indexing ==
The journal is abstracted and indexed in:

- Referativnyi Zhurnal
- Scopus
- EMBiology
- Elsevier BIOBASE
- Science Citation Index Expanded
- Biological Abstracts
- BIOSIS Previews
- The Kew Record of Taxonomic Literature

According to the Journal Citation Reports, the journal has a 2011 impact factor of 0.267, ranking it 178th out of 190 journals in the category "Plant Sciences".
