= Alexandru Lapedatu =

Romanian government minister

Alexandru I. Lapedatu Member of the Romanian Academy
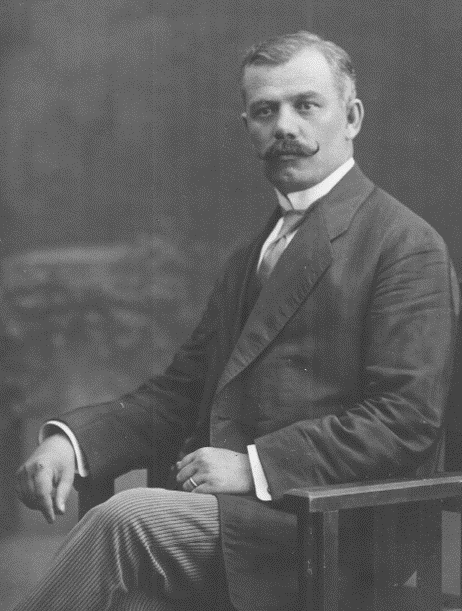
- Lapedatu in 1912

President of the Senate of Romania
- In office 16 November 1936 – 20 March 1937
- Monarch: Carol II of Romania
- Preceded by: Constantin Dimitriu-Dovlecel
- Succeeded by: Nicolae Iorga

Ministry of Cults and Arts
- In office 1923–1926; 1927–1928; 1934 – 1936

State Minister
- In office 1933–1934; 1936 – 1937

President of the Romanian Academy
- In office 1935–1938

Personal details
- Born: September 14, 1876 Csernátfalu, Austria-Hungary (now Cernatul Săcelelor, Romania)
- Died: August 30, 1950 (aged 73) Sighet Prison, Romanian People's Republic
- Citizenship: Romanian
- Spouse: Victoria Pană (1878–1965)
- Children: Ana Victoria ( Mica) (1914–1999)
- Profession: Historian, politician

Alexandru I. Lapedatu (14 September 1876 – 30 August 1950) was Cults and Arts and State minister of Romania, President of the Senate of Romania, member of the Romanian Academy, its president and general secretary.

== Family ==
Alexandru Lapedatu was the son of Ioan Alexandru Lapedatu, with a Ph.D. from the University of Brussels, Romanian poet, writer, journalist and professor for classical languages at the Higher Greek-Orthodox Romanian College in Brașov (today, Andrei Şaguna National College).

Alexandru Lapedatu had a twin brother, Ion Lapedatu, economist, politician and Governor of the National Bank of Romania. The twins became orphans when they were one and a half years old. Their mother could only rely on a modest social help from the Brașov municipality and some support from her family.

Alexandru Lapedatu married Victoria Pană (1878–1965) on 1 June 1911; a widow with two children from her first marriage, Mircea and Maria Lipăneanu. They had a daughter, Ana Victoria, also known as Mica (1914–1999).

== Education ==
Alexandru Lapedatu started 1883 the primary school in the village in which he was born, then he continued school in Brașov, moved from Austria-Hungary to the Kingdom of Romania, in Iași, came back to Brașov to start his college, but then returned to Iași and received his bachelor's degree from the Central College in Iași. He studied at the Faculty of Philology and Philosophy of the University of Bucharest, graduating in 1904 and getting a Diploma in Geography and History in 1910.

== Professional career ==
Alexandru Lapedatu sustained himself financially during his studies by giving private lessons or getting various jobs, like night corrector, then as columnist with the journal "România Jună (Young Romania)" (1899) and as a teacher for the Romanian language at the French College and the Lolliot College (1901–1903).

He started publishing national history studies already as a student, winning prizes set by University Foundation "Carol I" for his work on the Romanian princes Radu cel Frumos and Vlad-Vodă Călugărul, as well as being the university laureate and winner of the important "Hillel" price for his work "Istoria breslelor la români" ("The History of the Romanian Guilds").

Upon his graduation in 1903, Alexandru Lapedatu was offered an entry position as a clerk at the Library of the Romanian Academy, section for manuscripts, where he worked between 1903 and 1908; at the same time, he became a substitute professor at the Saint Sava National College in Bucharest.

He was appointed Secretary of the Historic Monuments Commission in 1904, becoming a member on 12 August 1919, being then nominated President of its Transylvania section (1921–1941) and elected President of the Historic Monuments Commission on 15 October 1941, performing this function until the commission has been disbanded by the communist regime in 1948.

Alexandru Lapedatu was active in a great number of commissions and associations. He was nominated secretary of the Romanian Historical Commission in 1909, and became member from 1911 to 1919, re-confirmed by royal decree in 1924.

He was the secretary of the Committee of the "Steaua" Association established by Spiru Haret, editing its last 27 monographs, from No. 20 to No. 47, mostly with historical content. He was elected in the Society "Arta Românească" in 1909, was an active member of the Romanian Royal Geographical Society (1915), was elected honorific member of the Romanian Numismatic Society (1920), held the Presidency of the Commission for Museum Reform in Transylvania (1921), was appointed by the Ministry of Public Education as President of the Commission for the Organization of the State Archives in Transylvania, was nominated in the Commission for Introducing National Toponyms in Transylvania, Banat and Partium, in the Commission for the Verification of the Valuable Assets and Public Goods of the Previous Hungarian Monarchy and from the other territories united with the Romanian State (1922). On 9 November 1922 he was proclaimed honorific member of the Religious Historical-Archaeological Society in Chișinău and he was a permanent delegate in the Committee of the Transylvanian Museum Society (Hungarian: Erdélyi Muzeum Egyesület) (1925).

In 1919, when the first Romanian University was established in Cluj by the Directory Council of Transylvania, Banat and Romanian Counties in Hungary (Romanian: Consiliul Dirigent al Transilvaniei, Banatului și ținuturilor românești din Ungaria), he was nominated professor for ancient history of Romanians on 23 August 1919, being confirmed by the King on 28 January 1920; he was a member of the faculty until 1940. He was elected dean (1921–1922) and vice-dean (1922–1923) of the Philology and Philosophy Faculty and was the co-founder, together with his colleague Ioan Lupaș, of the Institute of National History from Cluj, today the Institute of History "Gheorghe Barițiu" of the Romanian Academy, becoming in 1920–1938 its co-director, respectively in 1943–1945 its honorary director.

Alexandru Lapedatu was the general director of the State Archives of Romania (30 March 1923 – 24 March 1924).

In parallel with his academic activities, Alexandru Lapedatu gave history conferences in Folk High Schools: in the Summer School in Vălenii de Munte, initiated in 1914 by Nicolae Iorga; in the University Extension in Cluj, 1925, where he was elected Honorary President; and in Free University or Folk University Association under director Sabina Cantacuzino.

In 1910 Alexandru Lapedatu was elected correspondent member, then in 1918 active member of the History Section of the Romanian Academy. He was elected vice-president (1934–1935, 1938–1939), then President of the Romanian Academy (3 June 1935 – 31 May 1938), and at the end of his mandate was elected its Secretary General (30 May 1939 – 12 August 1948). Alexandru Lapedatu has been among the 113 members purged from the Romanian Academy (Decree Nr. 76 from 8 June 1948 of the communist regime). The General Assembly of the Romanian Academy from 3 June 1990 reinstated his full membership.

The list of the scientific publications by Alexandru Lapedatu contains 424 titles.

== Political activity ==
Descending from a family keeping "strong the awareness of the rights of the unbending man", remaining "tenacious in its aspirations", Alexandru Lapedatu participated already in his school years, as many of his generation, in Romanian protests and demonstrations like the ones in Iași, in solidarity with the authors of the Memorandum. During his University studies in Bucharest, he was an active member of the League for the Cultural Unity of All Romanians.

At the beginning of the World War I, in Bucharest, he was nominated secretary of the Support Committee for the Refugees from Transylvania, Banat and Bukovina (1914–1916). In January 1918 he co-founded in Odessa the National Committee of the Romanian Refugees from Austria-Hungary that elected him as president, moved to Iași and became a political platform bringing substantive contributions in preparing Romania for the peace negotiations.

In 1920, Alexandru Lapedatu was nominated as member of the Coronation Commission to organize the festivities consecrating Ferdinand I as the King of all Romanians, formally closing the political process of the Union of Transylvania with Romania. In 1927, upon King Ferdinand I's death, he was a member in the Senate delegation establishing the Regency and having it take the oath in front of the two Chambers of the Parliament.

He joined the National Liberal Party in 1920, when he was elected a member of the Central Committee and of the Permanent Delegation, becoming the undeniable leader of the liberals in Transylvania.

At the foundation of the new University of Cluj, Alexandru Lapedatu was elected as the first professor to represent it in the Romanian Senate from 1919 to 1920.

His first elected office as a member of the National Liberal Party was in 1922 as a member of the Assembly of Deputies from Ceica (Bihor). After this, he has been elected either in the Assembly of Deputies or in the Senate in all terms until 1940; he became Senator for life in 1936 and was elected President of the Romanian Senate (16 November 1936 – 20 March 1937). He lost his seat in the Senat when the Parliament has been dismantled by the military dictatorship, but after the war he was elected for the last time in the Chamber of Deputies in 1946–1947.

Alexandru Lapedatu was Arts and Cults Minister in the six Governments and State Minister in four Governments; from 9 June 1934, while State Minister in the Tătărescu (1) Government, he was also in charge of the Cults and Arts Department and the Minority Under-Secretariat; in addition to his mandate, he also was as ad-interim Minister of Labour, Cooperation and Social Assurance in the Barbu Știrbei Government (4-6 June 1927). As State Minister for Transylvania in the Ion G. Duca Government, he co-signed the Journal of the Council of Ministers from 9 December 1927 that outlawed the fascist Iron Guard; as revenge, members of the Iron Guard assassinated Ion G. Duca on 30 December 1933. His functions are listed in detail in the following table.

Government				Parliament			
From	To	Prime minister	Function	From	To	Chamber	Circum-scription
1.12.1919	12.3.1920	Vaida-Voievod (1) (Federation)		1919	1920	Senator	Uni. Cluj
19.1.1922	29.3.1926	I. I. C. Brătianu (6)	30.10.1923: Cults and Arts Minister	27.2.1922	27.3.1926	Deputy	Bihor
30.4.1926	4.6.1927	Averescu (3)		25.6.1926	6.6.1927	Senator	Uni. Cluj
4.6.1927	20.6.1927	Stirbey	Cults and Arts Minister	25.6.1926	6.6.1927	Senator	Uni. Cluj
21.6.1927	24.11.1927	I. I. C. Brătianu (7)	Cults and Arts Minister				
21.6.1927	9.11.1928	Vintilă Brătianu	22.6.1923: Cults and Arts Minister	17.7.1927	10.11.1928	Senator	Brașov
10.11.1928	6.6.1930	Maniu (1)		22.12.1928	30.4.1931	Senator	
7.6.1930	12.6.1930	Mironescu (1)		22.12.1928	30.4.1931	Senator	
13.6.1930	9.10.1930	Maniu (2)		22.12.1928	30.4.1931	Senator	
10.10.1930	17.4.1931	Mironescu (2)		22.12.1928	30.4.1931	Senator	
18.4.1931	5.6.1932	Iorga		15.6.1931	10.6.1932	Deputy	Brasov
6.6.1932	10.8.1932	Vaida Voievod (2)		30.7.1932	18.11.1933	Senator	Uni. Cluj
11.8.1932	19.10.1932	Vaida Voievod (3)		30.7.1932	18.11.1933	Senator	Uni. Cluj
20.10.1932	13.1.1933	Maniu (3)		30.7.1932	18.11.1933	Senator	Uni. Cluj
14.1.1933	13.11.1933	Vaida Voievod (4)		30.7.1932	18.11.1933	Senator	Uni. Cluj
14.11.1933	29.12.1933	Duca	State Minister for Transylvania				
30.12.1933	3.1.1934	Angelescu	State Minister				
5.1.1934	1.10.1934	Tătărăscu (1)	State Minister 9.6.1934: also Cults and Arts and Minorities	1.2.1934	19.12.1937 Since March 1936 16.11.1936- 20.3.1937	Senator Senator for life. President of the Senate	Cluj
2.10.1934	28.8.1936	Tătărăscu (2)	Cults and Arts Minister	1.2.1934	19.12.1937 Since March 1936 16.11.1936- 20.3.1937	Senator Senator for life. President of the Senate	Cluj
29.8.1936	14.11.1937	Tătărăscu (3)	State Minister	1.2.1934	19.12.1937 Since March 1936 16.11.1936- 20.3.1937	Senator Senator for life. President of the Senate	Cluj
6.3.1945	30.11.1946	Petru Groza (1)				End of the Senator for life mandate as the Senate is abolished	
1.12.1946	31.12.1947	Petru Groza (2)		1.12.1946	November 1947 (the National Liberal Party is interdicted)	Deputy in the unicameral legislatures	

Alexandru Lapedatu joined the National Renaissance Front established by King Carol II of Romania (Royal Decree Nr. 4321 from 15 December 1938) as the only political organization legally allowed in the country; Carol II transformed the Front into the Party of the Nation (Royal Decree Nr. 2056 from 22 June 1940) that was disbanded by the prime minister Ion Antonescu (Decree of 9 September 1940) three days after Carol's abdication.

After King Michael's Coup d'état from 23 August 1944 that removed Ion Antonescu from power, the political parties prepared to re-enter the political life and Alexandru Lapedatu assumed leadership for the effort to rebuild the National Liberal Party-Brătianu in Transylvania (a parallel effort with the same objective was led by Gheorghe Tătărăscu). Alexandru Lapedatu entered in some circumscriptions in Transylvania in an electoral cartel with the Peasants' Party obtaining a modest and ephemeral electoral success in the elections from 19 November 1946, when two candidates were elected: Lapedatu in Cluj and Vasile Netea in Satu Mare, in spite of the tremendous pressure and falsifications perpetrated by the so-called Bloc of Democratic Parties dominated by the Communists. He soon recognized that the communist repression would prevail, but did not give up hope: on 30 September 1949, it was reported to the Securitate that Alexandru Lapedatu "believes in the future of the nation and in the capitulation of Russia and of communism". His vision has been confirmed more than 50 years later, with the fall of the Berlin Wall.

=== International missions ===
In 1917, the Central Powers armies occupied Bucharest and were advancing towards Iași. The Romanian Government decided to move the State Treasury to Russia in two transports, delegating Alexandru Lapedatu to accompany the second one that included cultural goods. He left Iași for Moscow on 28 July 1917, and stayed there until 19 December 1917, experiencing the arrival of the Bolshevik revolution.

Alexandru Lapedatu was a member of the Romanian delegation to the Paris Peace Conference (1919), participating in the negotiations on three instances: December 1918 – June 1919, taking part in the signature ceremony of the Treaty of Versailles; again July – August 1919 participating in the incipient phase of the negotiations concerning Bessarabia; and finally December 1919 – March 1920, contributing to the negotiations with Hungary that will be concluded by the Treaty of Trianon.

On 31 March 1922, he was nominated as a delegate and technical adviser in the Romanian Delegation to the Genoa Economic and Financial Conference (10 April – 19 May 1922) in which representatives from 34 nations addressed the Europe restoration in the aftermath of World War I.

Alexandru Lapedatu was the head of the Romanian delegation to the Inter-Parliamentary Conferences in Rome (1936) and in Paris (1937), and also participated in the XXXV Conference in Oslo (15–19 August 1939), one of the last efforts to secure peace just a few days before the beginning of the World War II.

=== Romanian Participation in the Paris Peace Conference (1919) ===
Alexandru Lapedatu engaged politically in working for the Romanian unity in 1918, as President of the National Committee of the Romanian Refugees from Austria-Hungary, established in Odessa on 21 January 1918, then moved to Iași. It pursued the political unity of all Romanians and intended to represent them in Tomáš Garrigue Masaryk's Nationality Association in Kiev. Through this committee, Lapedatu connected with key political personalities in Romania and, thanks to the support from the French Ambassador, the Count of Saint-Aulaire, established contacts the Triple Entente's representatives. On 6 / 19 October the Committee issued a Declaration, distributed to all political actors including King Ferdinand I, contesting the manifesto of Charles I of Austria proclaiming the federalization of the Empire and demanding that all territories inhabited by Romanians be united with Romania. Experiencing the depressing installation of a German Mission in Iași as a consequence of the Treaty of Bucharest (1918), Alexandru Lapedatu published the paper "Chestiunea transilvană" ("The Transylvanian Issue") in Neamul Românesc, stating that the solution will be found when the situation of all nationalities will be addressed in the peace negotiations at the end of the war, expected to happen soon.

In his letter from 28 June 1918 to the President of the National Liberal Party, Ion I. C. Brătianu, Alexandru Lapedatu, convinced that the war was going to be ended soon, expressed the urgent need for a document summarizing the Romanian position in the upcoming peace negotiations, specifically addressing: 1) the geographical, ethnical, social, cultural and political situation of the Romanians in relationship with the other nationalities; 2) the historical and political evolution between Romanians and Hungarians; 3) the denationalization policies in Transylvania and Bukovina; and 4) the impossibility to implement autonomy, federalization and the unavoidable dismantling of the Danube monarchy to create new national states. In recognition to his competence, Alexandru Lapedatu was nominated between 1919 and 1922 as an expert in the Romanian delegation to the Paris Peace Conference (1918); the documents he authored were submitted by Romania to the Conference and were used by the Romanian Delegation as basis for the negotiations.

=== The Cultural Policy in the United Romania ===
Alexandru Lapedatu had cultural activities in various associations and foundations, such as in the Asociația Transilvană pentru Literatura Română și Cultura Poporului Român (ASTRA) (Transylvanian Association for the Romanian Literature and the Culture of the Romanian People) that proclaimed him honorific member (8/9 November 1924), then elected him member of the "demographic and ethnology-politic section" (14/15 September 1935). For ASTRA he provided funding, held conferences, supported the publication of the ASTRA library, and donated the Fund "Al. I. Lapedatu".

Alexandru Lapedatu expressed his conviction that promoting the cultural development is an essential mission of the State and the nation, and proposed and implemented policies pursuing the enhancement of the cultural and artistic prestige of all cities, and of the country as a whole. Alexandru Lapedatu formulated the principles of the monument preservation and restoration already in 1911. Under his leadership, the Transylvania Section of the Historical Monuments Commission executed in 1929–1948 more than 240 conservation and restoration projects, addressing Romanian heritage such as antiques Roman and Dacian vestiges, medieval stone churches and monasteries, wooden architecture, rear glass painted icons, the Hunedoara and Bran Castles, the Suțu Palace and the Filipescu House in Bucharest etc. After 1918, the Commission for Historic Monuments also undertook large restoration works on monuments belonging to Hungarian or Saxon minorities including Roman Catholic or Evangelical churches in Cluj-Napoca, Sibiu, Brașov, Alba Iulia, Sighișoara etc.

As Cults and Arts Minister for almost seven years, he pursued a wide the areas of activities:

- He initiated and/or supported the establishment of museums in Bucharest (National Pinacoteca, "Theodor Aman", "Kalinderu", "Simu"); in Cluj-Napoca (Ethnographic Museum, Museum of the Romanian Language, the National History Museum); in Vidra ("Avram Iancu" Museum); in Turnu Severin (remains of the Trajan's bridge across the Danube built by Apollodorus); in Alba Iulia (Museum of the Union), in Constanța (Dobrogea Museum); as well as in many other cities among which Turda, Sighișoara, Oradea, Arad, Sighetu Marmației, Timișoara, Dej, Băile Herculane, Caransebeș, Târgu Mureș, Sarmizegetusa, Năsăud, Bistrița, Brașov, Făgăraș, Blaj, Sibiu, Zalău, Satu Mare, Deva, Piatra Neamț etc.
- He supported financially and participated in the unveiling of public monuments dedicated to Romanian historic and cultural personalities among which Gheorghe Lazăr (Cluj, 1924); Avram Iancu (Baia de Criș, 1924); Ion Creangă, Nicolae N. Beldiceanu, Dimitrie Anghel, Nicolae Gane and Barbu Ștefănescu Delavrancea (Iași, 1924); Ioan Mihaly of Apșa (Sighetu Marmatiei, 1925); Stephen The Great (Chișinău, 1925); Michael the Brave (1926, Guruslău, dismantled in 1940 by the Hungarian authorities); B.P. Hasdeu (1927); D. Onciul (1927); Vasile Alecsandri (mausoleum in Mircești, 1928); Horia, Cloșca and Crișan (Alba Iulia 1929); Barbu Ștefănescu Delavrancea (Oradea, 1934); Ecaterina Teodoroiu (Târgu Jiu, 1935); Vasile Lucaciu (Satu Mare, 1935); Spiru Haret (1940) etc.
- To stimulate the development of the national culture, Alexandru Lapedatu as Minister of Cults and Arts institutes in 1925 the National Awards for Culture and Arts. Considering that establishing theatrical institutions in the national language is a moral duty in the new provinces, a direct contribution to the cultural unification, he collaborates with the dramatic authors, actors, directors and producers, submits to the Parliament for adoption and signs the Law Regarding the Organization and Administration of the National Theaters and the Performances Control in Romania adopted by the Parliament on 21 March 1926, establishing a safety net for the artists, with payment, retirement, litigation and other rights, and the obligation to also show original plays in Romanian language besides the international repertoire.

=== The General Regime of the Cults in Romania (1928–1948) ===
The first challenging task of Alexandru Lapedatu as a minister has been to establish a legal frame for the cults in the unified Romania.

He presented the statement of reasons for the law clarifying that in the united Romania, besides the Orthodox Church, the State recognized the following cults: Romanian Greek-Catholic (united), Catholic (of Latin, Greek and Armenian ritual), reformed (Calvin), evangelic-Lutheran, Unitarian, Mosaic, Muslim and finally Baptist (recognized only in Transylvania), each governed by a different legislation in the regions coming from Russia, Austria, Hungary, Bulgaria respectively the Kingdom of Romania.

The framework was set by the Constitution from 1923 that guaranteed absolute freedom of consciousness and equal treatment for all cults, except that it stipulated that the Orthodox Church was dominant, and the Greek-catholic cult has priority.

While acknowledging the historical merits of the two cults highlighted by the Constitution, Alexandru Lapedatu worked towards a legislation reinforcing State sovereignty and secularism.

- First, he proposed a law to elevate the status of the head of Romanian Orthodox Church to the rank of a Patriarch; it was adopted by the Parliament on 25 February 1925, with his signature as the responsible minister;
- Second, he worked with the Orthodox Church to define its Statute unifying the regional specificities; upon his proposal, the Parliament adopted the Statute by the law from 6 May 1925, with his signature as the responsible minister;
- Third, he collaborated with the Ministry of Foreign Affairs to restart the negotiations on a Concordat with the Holy See and concluded them on 15 January 1926 when an official text was agreed upon by both parties; the Concordat was signed by his follower on 10 May 1927 and ratified on 12 June 1929.

Since the two exceptions mentioned in the Constitution were no more in the position to challenge State prerogatives, it was now possible for Alexandru Lapedatu to submit to the Parliament, after animated consultations and debates, a project that obtained almost the unanimity of votes both in the Chamber of Deputy and in the Senate; it was adopted on 22 April 1928 and remained in power until 1948. It was an essential achievement toward the unification of the young Romanian State.

== Death ==
In 1950, the communist regime cancelled the pension of Alexandru Lapedatu, leaving him without any revenue. He was arrested in the night of 5/6 May 1950 in the so-called "group of dignitaries". He died on 30 August 1950 in the Sighet Prison and was buried in an unmarked common grave. His cenotaph is in the "Groaveri" cemetery in Brașov.

== Distinctions ==
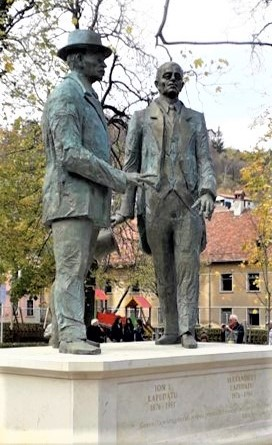
Double monument of the Lapedatu twins in Brașov

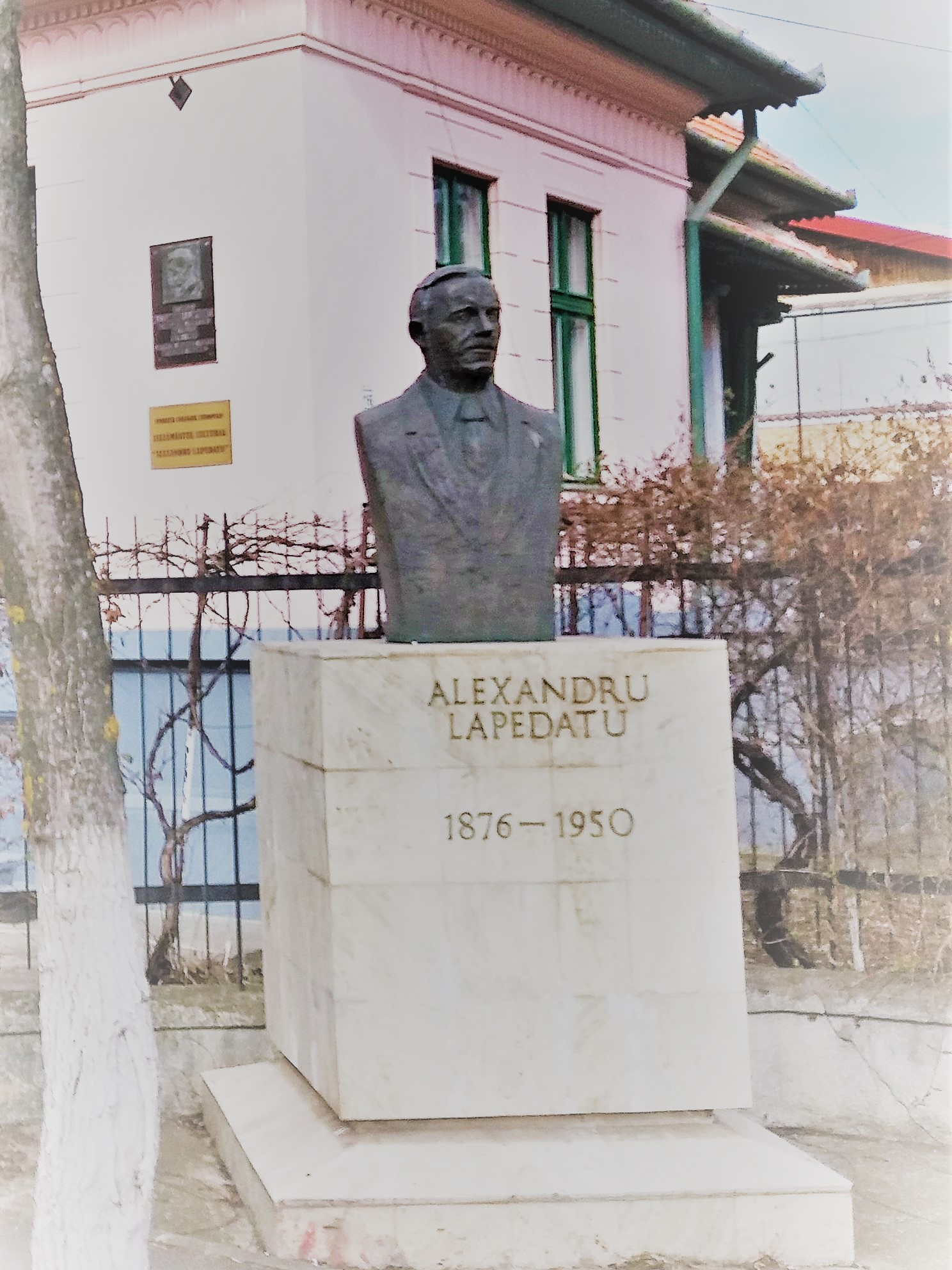
Bust of Alexandru Lapedatu in Cluj-Napoca, Romania

Alexandru Lapedatu received national and foreign distinctions:

National distinctions:

- Jubilee medal Carol I, Royal decree Nr. 5384/28, December 1905. Official Journal Nr. 218 / 1 January 1906 – 10 May 1906
- Order of Bene Merenti of the Royal House, Grade: Officer or 2nd Class, Royal Decree Nr. 885/24 March 1909
- Order of the Star of Romania, Grade: Commander, Royal Decree from 21 October 1922
- Order of the Crown (Romania), Grade: Grand Cross, Royal Decree from 22 January 1926
- Order of Bene Merenti of the Royal House, Grade: Commander or 1st Class, Royal Decree Nr. 2749/ 3 November 1928 for achievements in the fields of "history, literature and education"
- Medal "The Reward for the Work in Education", First Class, Royal Decree Nr. 4102 / 17 November 1930 "for services in the field of education"
- Honorific Sign "The Reward for the Work in the Public Service" for 25 years, Royal Decree Nr. 3994 / 10 December 1931
- The Order "The Cultural Merit" for literature, Grade: Officer or First Class, Royal Decree from 22 September 1931 "for services brought to education and religion, as well as contributions in the field of literature, arts, sciences and social endeavours"
- The "Peleș" Medal, established by Royal Decree Nr. 2305 / 16 August 1933; awarded: Decree Nr. 224 / 25 September 1933
- Honorific Sign "Eagle of Romania", Grade: Commander of Second Class, Royal Decree Nr. 2762 / 11 November 1933
- Order of Ferdinand I, Grade: Knight, Royal Decree from 15 March 1934
- Medal for the Centenary of King Carol I / Medalia Centenarul Regelui Carol I, Royal Decree Nr. 1915, 2036 / 1939 and Nr. 372 / 1940
- "For contributions to the army supply", Brevet issued by the Ministry of Supply / Ministerul inzestrarii armatei, Nr. 6272 / p March 1940
- "Cultural Merit" Order and Medal, Grade: Commander, Royal Decree Nr. 248 / 1 February 1943 "for literature"

Foreign :

- The Cross of Merit of the Holy Sepulchre with Collar, Jerusalem, decree Nr. 68 / 26 Jan. 1924
- Order of Polonia Restituta, class: Grand Cross, 1925
- Medal of the National Order of the Legion of Honour, grade: Commander, Paris, decree Nr. 56608 / 19 Dec 1927
- Order of the Crown of Italy, grade: Great Cross, Chancellery of Orders nr. 1067 / 8 June. 1928
- Order of St. Gregory the Great, Grade: Great Cross (civilian), Pontifical Decree of Pius XI / 10 September 1929
- Order of the White Lion, Grade: Great Cross, Decree of the Czechoslovakia President, 1937
- Order of the Yugoslav Crown, Grade: Great Cross, Decree Nr. 1116 / 20 Feb. 1937

== Legacy ==
Streets in Romania named after Alexandru Lapedatu:

- Alexandru Lapedatu Alley, Cluj-Napoca
- Alexandru Ion Lapedatu Street, Brașov
- Alexandru Ion Lapedatu Street, Săcele

Alexandru Lapedatu donated his library to the Central University Library of Cluj-Napoca; he is listed in the Golden Book of donors and the Professors' Reading Hall is named after him.

His bust is placed in front of the house he built in Cluj-Napoca, where today functions the "Alexandru Lapedatu" Cultural Establishment and the European College Foundation.

His name is on plaques on his native house in Săcele, in the National College Andrei Șaguna and in the National College Saint Sava. In 2019, a double monument dedicated to the Lapedatu brothers was unveiled under the aegis of the Romanian Academy, the National Bank of Romania and the City of Brașov.
