= Mugur Isărescu =

Governor of the National Bank of Romania

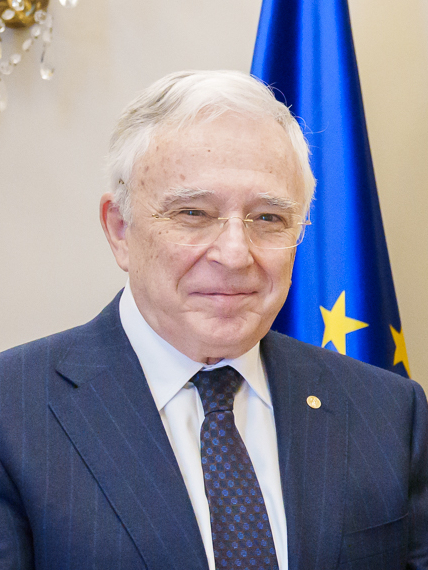
- Isărescu in 2025

Prime Minister of Romania
- In office 22 December 1999 – 28 December 2000
- President: Emil Constantinescu; Ion Iliescu
- Preceded by: Alexandru Athanasiu (Acting); Radu Vasile
- Succeeded by: Adrian Năstase

Governor of the National Bank of Romania
- Incumbent
- Assumed office 28 December 2000
- Preceded by: Emil Iota Ghizari (ad interim)
- In office 4 September 1990 – 22 December 1999
- Preceded by: Decebal Urdea
- Succeeded by: Emil Iota Ghizari (ad interim)

Personal details
- Born: Constantin Mugur Isărescu; 1 August 1949 (age 77) Drăgășani, Vâlcea County, Romanian People's Republic
- Party: Independent
- Spouse: Elena Isărescu
- Children: 2
- Education: Bucharest Academy of Economic Studies
- Awards: Order of the Star of Romania, Grand Cross rank

Constantin Mugur Isărescu (Note: Romanian pronunciation: [ˈmuɡur isəˈresku]) (born 1 August 1949) is the governor of the National Bank of Romania, a position he has been holding since September 1990, with the sole exception of a period of time of one year (22 December 1999 to 28 December 2000), during which he served as Prime Minister of Romania. In addition, he is also a member of the Romanian Academy. Isărescu is a member of The Trilateral Commission.

== Early life ==
Isărescu was born in Drăgășani, Vâlcea County, Romania. His father was a school teacher who, after the establishment of the Romanian People's Republic, studied at the Academy of Economic Studies in Bucharest (ASE), worked as a bank executive during the 1950s, and then was a professor of accounting for 20 years.

Isărescu studied international trade at the Academy of Economic Studies in Bucharest, which he graduated in 1971, and where he was an assistant professor between 1975 and 1989. In 1989, Isărescu defended his Ph.D. thesis on exchange rate policies under the supervision of Costin Kirițescu.

For 19 years, he worked as a researcher for the Institute of International Economics. He took a number of courses in the United States, writing several papers on capitalist economics. Isărescu claims it was as if he prepared for 20 years for the 1990 moment.

During this period he gave notes under several aliases to the Communist Secret Services about ladies with different problems, about colleagues at the institute, and about the foreigners he was meeting. One alias Isărescu used to sign the information notes to the Securitate was "Manole".

In February 1990, after the Romanian Revolution of 1989, he began working for the Ministry of Foreign Affairs. In March 1990, he was sent to work as an economic and monetary affairs secretary at the Romanian Embassy in the United States, being in charge of handling Romania's relations with the International Monetary Fund and the World Bank.

He expected that Romania would need IMF help within a couple of years, but he was surprised to find that the government depleted the foreign-exchange reserves within six months and, as such, he was recalled to Romania in July 1990 to head the National Bank.

== Governor of the National Bank of Romania ==
In September 1990, he was named Governor of the National Bank of Romania by the Romanian government. During the early years, he negotiated several agreements with the International Monetary Fund. His mandate was renewed by the Parliament of Romania in 1991, 1998, 2004, 2009, 2014, 2019 and 2024.

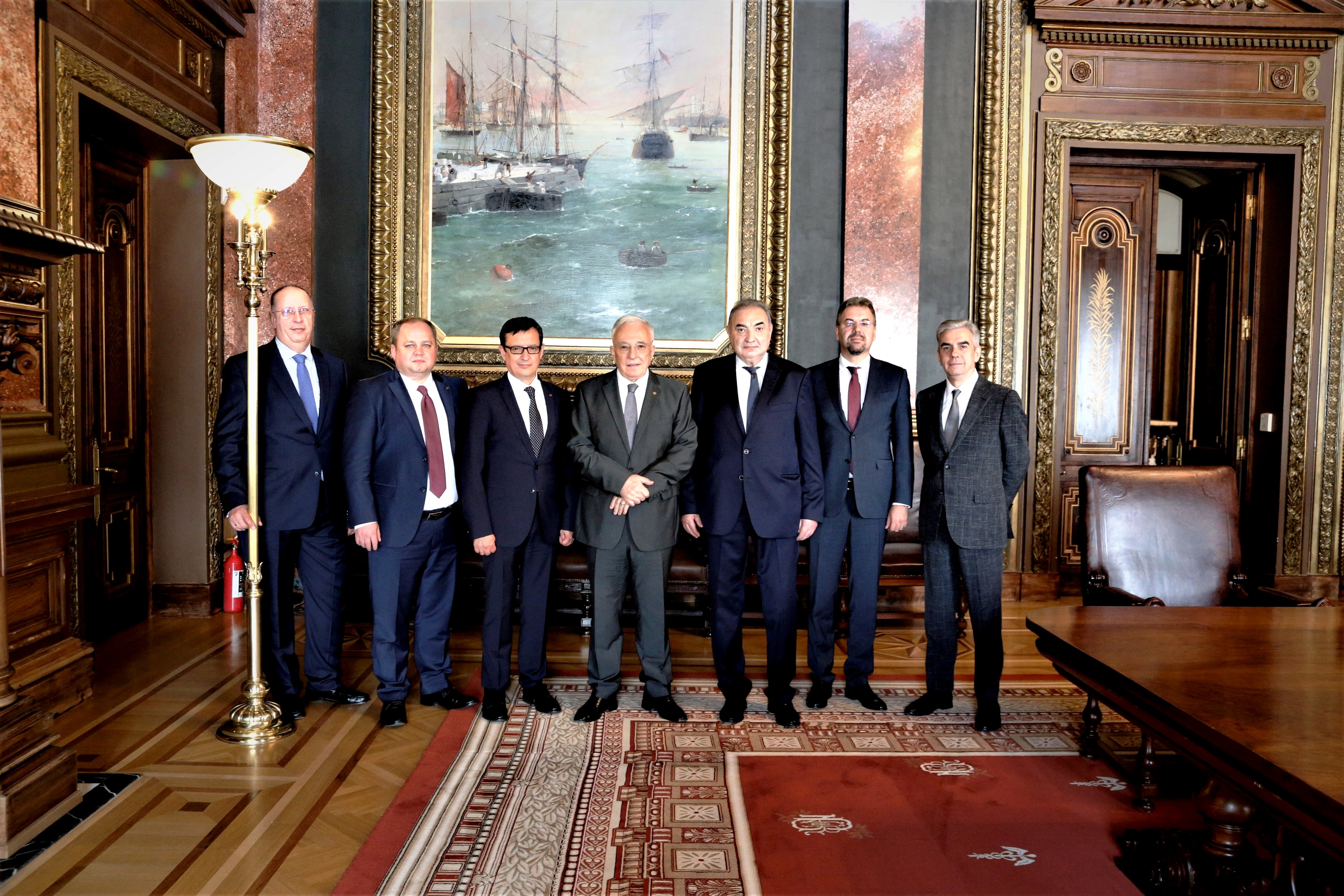
Isărescu during a visit by NBM governor Octavian Armașu among others, 20 September 2022

According to a World Record Academy article, Isărescu managed in 19 years of leadership at the National Bank of Romania to create and maintain a mysterious aura around the policies of the National Bank, and some pointed out that the agenda of the Bank remained independent from any Romanian Government. The same article states that some credit the National Bank team for saving Romania's economy from a Bulgarian-type collapse, raising the national gold and Euro reserves beyond needs, cutting down inflation to single-digit figures and introducing the New Leu. In 2009, the World Record Academy named him as the longest-serving governor of a central bank.

He was involved in a series of legislative debates regarding some consumer protection laws, as "datio in solutium" and Swiss franc to Romanian leu conversion, when he had a pronounced role, strongly supporting banks against Romanian debtors, in last two years. In March 2025, Octavian Armașu, the governor of the Moldovan national bank from 2018 to 2023, was appointed an advisor to Isărescu.

== Prime Minister of Romania ==
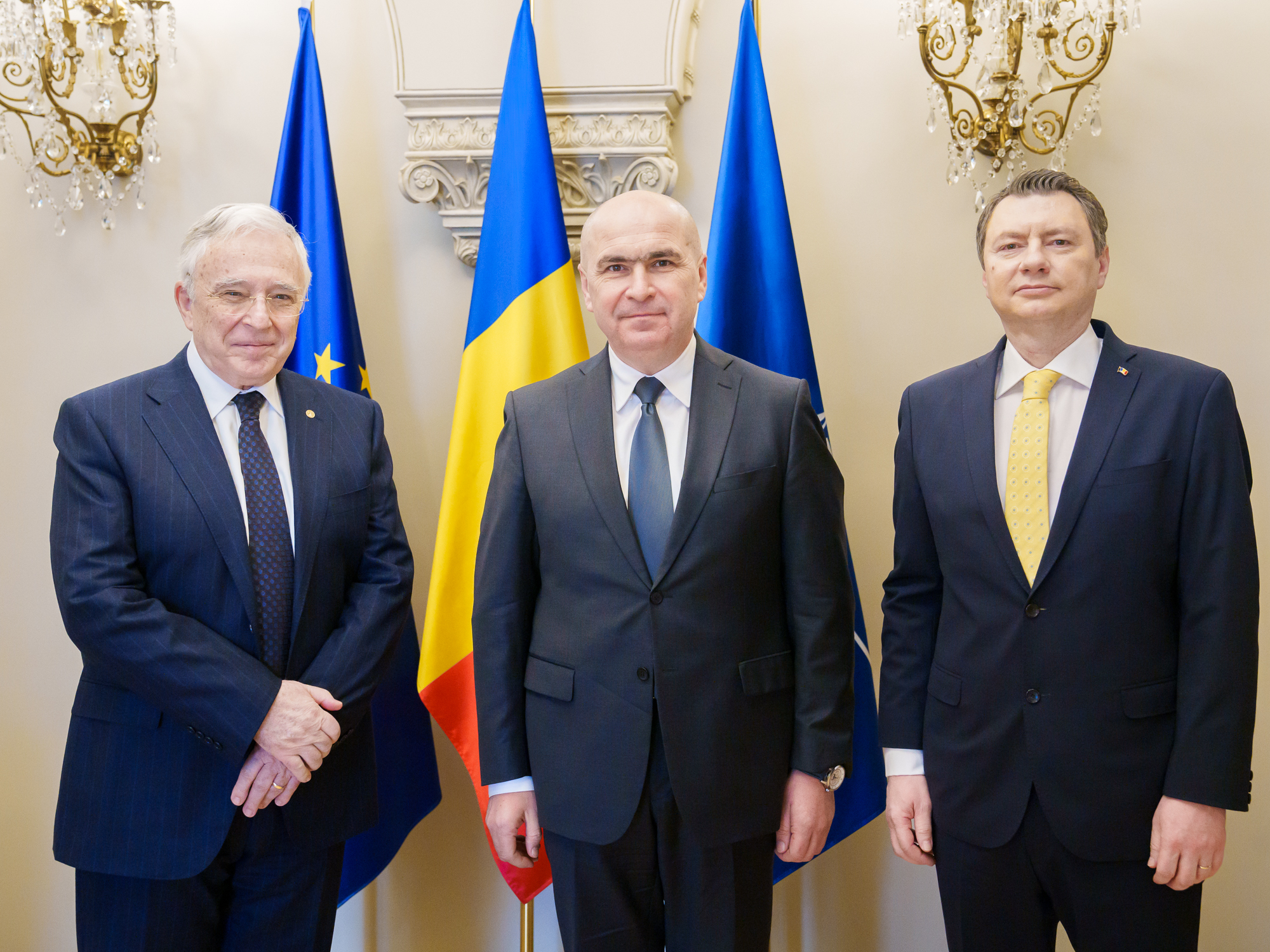
Isărescu meeting with acting Romanian president Ilie Bolojan (centre), 17 February 2025

In 1999, Isărescu was asked to become Prime Minister of Romania, which he accepted on the condition that he could return to the National Bank after it was over. Then-President Emil Constantinescu agreed with the terms and on 16 December 1999 Isărescu was sworn in as Prime Minister of Romania, but only for about a year, since in November 2000, the ruling coalition lost the election.

In November 2000 Isărescu ran for President of Romania but was soundly defeated, coming in fourth place and receiving 9% of the vote. Thereafter, he returned to the National Bank of Romania for another term as governor.

Although Isărescu served only one year as Prime Minister, Isărescu is considered to have started the reform process, continued later by Adrian Năstase and Călin Popescu-Tăriceanu. During his premiership, on 15 February 2000, Romania formally initiated negotiations with the European Union (a process started by the Romanian application in 1995 and European Commission approval on 13 October 1999). As governor of the National Bank of Romania, Mugur Isărescu has coordinated Romania's monetary policy since 1990.

Isărescu was considered several times between 2009 and 2012 as a suitable replacement for Emil Boc as Prime Minister of Romania. Isărescu declined the offer from President Băsescu, refusing to re-assume his former office in order to remain Governor of BNR.

== Other activities ==
=== International organizations ===
- European Systemic Risk Board (ESRB), Ex-Officio Member of the General Board
- International Monetary Fund (IMF), Ex-Officio Member of the Board of Governors

=== Non-profit organizations ===
- Club of Rome, Member
- Trilateral Commission, Member

== Recognition ==
Isărescu is a recipient of the Grand Cross and Sash ranks of the Order of the Star of Romania.

The Romanian Royal Family awarded him the title of Honorary Knight Commander of the Order of the Crown.

== Electoral history ==
=== Presidential elections ===
Election	Affiliation	First round			Second round		
Election	Affiliation	Votes	Percentage	Position	Votes	Percentage	Position
2000	Independent (supported by CDR 2000)	1,069,463	9.5%	4th			

Political offices
Preceded by Alexandru Athanasiu; Acting	Prime Minister of Romania; 1999–2000	Succeeded by Adrian Năstase
Government offices
Preceded by Decebal Urdea	Governor of the National Bank of Romania; 1990–1999	Succeeded by Eugen Ghizari; Acting
Preceded by Eugen Ghizari; Acting	Governor of the National Bank of Romania; 2000–present	Incumbent
