= Steven L. Danver =

American historian

Steven Laurence Danver (born October 17, 1967 in Orange County, California) is an American historian. He is managing editor of the Journal of the West and has taught widely and written numerous influential works on the history of the Western United States, Native Americans, environmental policy and other subjects.

== Biography ==
Steven L. Danver was born and raised in Southern California. He received his BA in religious studies from University of California, Santa Barbara, his MA in historical studies from the Graduate Theological Union, and his PhD in American history from the University of Utah. He is currently Dean of Arts & Sciences at Peninsula College in Port Angeles, Washington. During 2022-24, he was Assistant Dean for Instruction at Columbia Basin College in Pasco, Washington. During 2009-2020, he held a number of academic and administrative posts at Walden University, including being appointed as the founding executive director of the Centers for General Education and Competency-Based Education. Danver has taught at numerous colleges and universities, most recently at Washington State University Vancouver, Linfield University, The Chicago School of Professional Psychology and National University (California). He has also been managing editor of the Journal of the West since 2004. He lives in Washington.

Danver specializes in the history of the Western United States, in particular the relationship between Native Americans and American environmental policy. He has taught widely, and is the author of several works on indigenous peoples and other historical subjects. In 2013, Danver was given the Best of Reference Award by Library Journal for his book Native Peoples of the World, and the Outstanding Academic Title from the American Library Association for his work Encyclopedia of Water Politics and Policy in the United States.

Danver edited Popular Controversies in World History: Investigating History's Intriguing Questions, in 2011, in four volumes, which Teaching History rated "recommended" for college libraries, but with reservations.

== Selected bibliography ==
- Encyclopedia Water Politics and Policy in the United States, 2011
- Native Peoples of the World: An Encyclopedia of Groups, Cultures, and Contemporary Issues, 2012
- Encyclopedia of Politics of the American West, 2013
- The SAGE Encyclopedia of Online Education, 2016
