= Governor of the National Bank of Romania =

Head of the National Bank of Romania

Governor of The National Bank of Romania
- Guvernator al Băncii Naționale a României
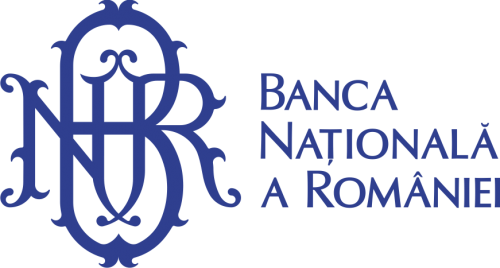
- Logo of the National Bank

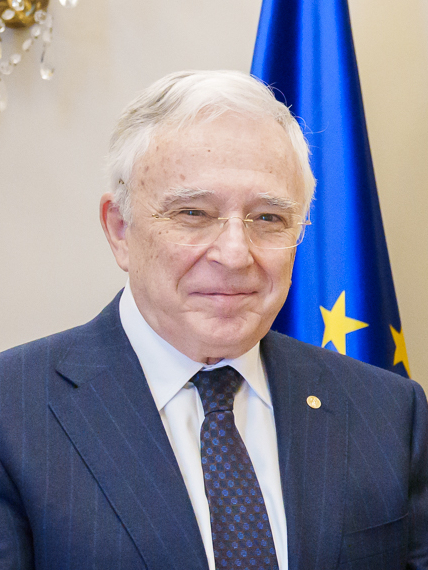
- Incumbent; Mugur Isărescu since 4 September 1990
- Nominator: Senate and the Chamber of Deputies
- Appointer: Senate and the Chamber of Deputies
- Inaugural holder: Ion Câmpineanu
- Formation: 15 July 1880
- Website: http://www.bnro.ro/

The governor of the National Bank of Romania (Guvernatorul Băncii Naționale a României) is the head of the National Bank of Romania, being also the president of the Council of Administration of the Bank. The governor is named at the same time as the Council of Administration by the Parliament in a joint session of the Senate and the Chamber of Deputies for a five-year term.

The current Council of Administration was voted (named) on 6 October 2009. The current governor is Mugur Isărescu, the longest continuously serving governor, with a one-year interruption between December 1999 and December 2000, when he served as prime minister. During his premiership the office was held ad interim by Emil Iota Ghizari.

== Council of Administration ==
The Council of Administration of the National Bank of Romania is composed by nine members appointed by the Parliament of Romania, for a five-year, renewable term.

The current Board of Directors of the National Bank of Romania was appointed by Decision of the Parliament of Romania:

- Governor - Mugur Isărescu
- First-Deputy-Governor - Florin Georgescu
- Deputy-Governor - Leonardo Badea
- Deputy-Governor - Eugen Nicolăescu
- Member - Csaba Bálint
- Member - Gheorghe Gherghina
- Member - Cristian Popa
- Member - Dan Radu Rușanu
- Member - Virgiliu Stoenescu

== List of governors ==
#	Name	Term start	Term end	Title	Signature
1	Ion Câmpineanu	15 July 1880	1 December 1882	Governor of the National Bank of Romania; Guvernator al Băncii Naționale a României	
2	Anton Carp	1 December 1882	27 February 1888	Governor of the National Bank of Romania; Guvernator al Băncii Naționale a României	
(1)	Ion Câmpineanu	28 February 1888	15 November 1890	Governor of the National Bank of Romania; Guvernator al Băncii Naționale a României	
3	Theodor Rosetti	19 November 1890	21 November 1895	Governor of the National Bank of Romania; Guvernator al Băncii Naționale a României	
(2)	Anton Carp	21 November 1895	17 November 1899	Governor of the National Bank of Romania; Guvernator al Băncii Naționale a României	
4	Mihail C. Șutzu	18 November 1899	31 December 1904	Governor of the National Bank of Romania; Guvernator al Băncii Naționale a României	
(2)	Anton Carp	1 January 1905	12 March 1907	Governor of the National Bank of Romania; Guvernator al Băncii Naționale a României	
5	Theodor Ștefănescu	12 March 1907	1 November 1909	Governor of the National Bank of Romania; Guvernator al Băncii Naționale a României	
(2)	Anton Carp	1 November 1909	21 January 1914	Governor of the National Bank of Romania; Guvernator al Băncii Naționale a României	
6	Ioan Bibicescu	21 February 1914	11 December 1916	Deputy-Governor of the National Bank of Romania; Viceguvernator al Băncii Naționale a României	
6	Ioan Bibicescu	11 December 1916	31 December 1921	Governor of the National Bank of Romania; Guvernator al Băncii Naționale a României	
7	Mihail Oromolu	1 January 1922	31 December 1926	Governor of the National Bank of Romania; Guvernator al Băncii Naționale a României	
8	Dimitrie Burillianu	1 January 1927	9 March 1931	Governor of the National Bank of Romania; Guvernator al Băncii Naționale a României	
10	Constantin Angelescu	9 March 1931	10 June 1931	Governor of the National Bank of Romania; Guvernator al Băncii Naționale a României	
11	Mihail Manoilescu	14 July 1931	27 November 1931	Governor of the National Bank of Romania; Guvernator al Băncii Naționale a României	
(10)	Constantin Angelescu	27 November 1931	3 February 1934	Governor of the National Bank of Romania; Guvernator al Băncii Naționale a României	
12	Grigore Dimitrescu	3 February 1934	26 July 1935	Governor of the National Bank of Romania; Guvernator al Băncii Naționale a României	
13	Mitiță Constantinescu	23 September 1935	17 September 1940	Governor of the National Bank of Romania; Guvernator al Băncii Naționale a României	
14	Alexandru Ottulescu	17 September 1940	1 April 1944	Governor of the National Bank of Romania; Guvernator al Băncii Naționale a României	
(10)	Constantin Angelescu	1 April 1944	30 September 1944	Governor of the National Bank of Romania; Guvernator al Băncii Naționale a României	
15	Ion Lapedatu	30 September 1944	14 March 1945	Governor of the National Bank of Romania; Guvernator al Băncii Naționale a României	
16	Constantin Tătăranu	14 March 1945	21 May 1946	Governor of the National Bank of Romania; Guvernator al Băncii Naționale a României	
17	Tiberiu Moșoiu	21 May 1946	8 November 1947	Governor of the National Bank of Romania; Guvernator al Băncii Naționale a României	
18	Aurel Vijoli	18 November 1947	5 March 1952	Governor of the National Bank of Romania; Guvernator al Băncii Naționale a României	
19	Anton Moisescu	5 March 1952	23 May 1953	President of the State Bank of the Romanian People's Republic; Președinte al Băncii de Stat a Republicii Populare Române	
20	Petre Bălăceanu	23 May 1953	4 February 1956	President of the State Bank of the Romanian People's Republic; Președinte al Băncii de Stat a Republicii Populare Române	
21	Marin Lupu	4 February 1956	27 March 1957	President of the State Bank of the Romanian People's Republic; Președinte al Băncii de Stat a Republicii Populare Române	
22	Petre Bălăceanu	27 March 1957	4 November 1957	President of the State Bank of the Romanian People's Republic; Președinte al Băncii de Stat a Republicii Populare Române	
23	Marin Lupu	4 November 1957	23 January 1959	President of the State Bank of the Romanian People's Republic; Președinte al Băncii de Stat a Republicii Populare Române	
24	Coloman Maiorescu	23 January 1959	1 April 1963	Delegated President of the State Bank of the Romanian People's Republic; Președinte cu delegație al Băncii de Stat a Republicii Populare Române	
25	Vasile Malinschi	1 April 1963	20 September 1977	Governor of the National Bank of the Socialist Republic of Romania; Guvernator al Băncii Naționale a Republicii Socialiste România	
26	Vasile Răuță	20 September 1977	16 March 1984	Governor of the National Bank of the Socialist Republic of Romania; Guvernator al Băncii Naționale a Republicii Socialiste România	
27	Florea Dumitrescu	16 March 1984	17 March 1989	Governor of the National Bank of the Socialist Republic of Romania; Guvernator al Băncii Naționale a Republicii Socialiste România	
28	Decebal Urdea	31 March 1989	4 September 1990	Governor of the National Bank of the Socialist Republic of Romania; Guvernator al Băncii Naționale a Republicii Socialiste România	
29	Mugur Constantin Isărescu	4 September 1990	22 December 1999	Governor of the National Bank of Romania; Guvernator al Băncii Naționale a României	
—	Eugen Iota Ghizari (interim)	22 December 1999	28 December 2000	Governor of the National Bank of Romania; Guvernator al Băncii Naționale a României	
(29)	Mugur Constantin Isărescu	28 December 2000		Governor of the National Bank of Romania; Guvernator al Băncii Naționale a României	
