= Kowsar Publishing =

Dutch publishing company

Kowsar
- Status: Active
- Founded: 2002
- Country of origin: The Netherlands
- Headquarters location: Den Bosch
- Distribution: Worldwide
- Key people: Seyyed Mohammad Miri (CEO)
- Publication types: Open access scientific journals
- No. of employees: 30 (in 2019)
- Official website: brieflands.com

Kowsar - now Brieflands - is an STM publishing company which was founded in 2002 by Seyyed Mohammad Miri and Seyed-Moayed Alavian. Kowsar journals have been peer reviewed and are published open access under a Creative Commons Attribution License Non Commercial 4.0. The company is a member of the Committee on Publication Ethics.

Brieflands is an official member of ORCID (Open Researcher and Contributor ID), supporting accurate author identification and metadata integrity through persistent digital identifiers. It preserves 69 of its e-journals in Portico, a trusted digital archiving service, ensuring long-term accessibility and content stability. As a member of the Copyright Clearance Center (CCC), Brieflands also facilitates collective copyright licensing to support the legal and ethical reuse of its published materials. Furthermore, several Brieflands journals are indexed in major international databases such as Web of Science (SCIE and ESCI), Scopus, and PubMed Central, including Hepatitis Monthly, Innovative Journal of Pediatrics, and the International Journal of Endocrinology and Metabolism, reflecting its adherence to rigorous academic publishing standards.

The publisher has been referenced in broader academic discussions about journal quality and was previously listed on Beall’s List, which was discontinued in 2017 due to concerns over insufficient evidence and a lack of transparency in its evaluation criteria. Importantly, the two cited studies did not specifically assess this publisher, but rather analyzed samples of journals that had appeared on Beall’s List. Furthermore, the author of the second study has been noted to have had a conflict of interest involving this publisher, which may have influenced the objectivity of the findings. In 2018, PubMed Central conducted a re-evaluation of 16 Kowsar journals indexed in the database; 14 were found to "no longer satisfy PMC's Scientific Quality Standard" and were accordingly delisted. Some of its journals, like Anesthesiology and Pain Medicine, incorrectly claimed to be included in the Directory of Open Access Journals. The issue has been resolved in December 2019.

In 2022, the company - formerly known as KowsarMedical Publishing - became Brieflands.

== List of journals ==
The first journal published by Brieflands (formerly Kowsar) was Hepatitis Monthly. As of October 2019, the publisher was producing 63 journals, although it had published more in previous years. The following is a list of journals that are or were published by Brieflands.

- Jundishapur Journal of Chronic Disease Care
- Health Scope
- Reports of Radiotherapy and Oncology
- Innovative Journal of Pediatrics
- IJ Pharmaceutical Research
- Journal of Critical Care Excellence
- Jundishapur Journal of Physiology
- Zahedan Journal of Research in Medical Sciences
- Journal of Health Reports and Technology
- Jundishapur Journal of Oncology
- International Journal of Cardiovascular Practice
- Journal of Medical Education for Future Demands
- Journal of Comprehensive Pediatrics
- Journal of Motor Control and Learning
- Thrita Journal of Neuron
- International Cardiovascular Research Journal
- Anesthesiology and Pain Medicine
- Asian Journal of Sports Medicine
- IJ Psychiatry and Behavioral Sciences
- Educational Research in Medical Sciences
- Journal of Clinical Research in Paramedical Sciences
- Interventional Pain Medicine and Neuromodulation
- Journal of Inflammatory Diseases
- Medical-Surgical Nursing Journal
- Multidisciplinary Cardiovascular Annals
- Mass Gathering Medical Journal
- Journal of Nursing and Midwifery Sciences
- Journal of Reports in Pharmaceutical Sciences
- Journal of Archives in Military Medicine
- Journal of Cellular & Molecular Anesthesia
- International Journal of High Risk Behaviors and Addiction
- Jundishapur Journal of Health Sciences
- Shiraz E-Medical Journal
- Nephro-Urology Monthly
- Artificial Intelligence in Precision Medicine
- Journal of Skin and Stem Cell
- International Journal of Endocrinology and Metabolism
- Middle East Journal of Rehabilitation and Health Studies
- Annals of Military and Health Sciences Research
- Jundishapur Journal of Natural Pharmaceutical Products
- International Journal of Cancer Management
- Koomesh
- Jentashapir Journal of Cellular and Molecular Biology
- Modern Care Journal
- Journal of Advanced Immunopharmacology
- Archives of Clinical Infectious Diseases
- Jundishapur Journal of Microbiology
- Journal of Microbiota
- Hepatitis Monthly
- International Journal of Infection
- IJ Radiology
- Journal of Kermanshah University of Medical Sciences
- Comprehensive Health and Biomedical Studies
- Archives of Pediatric Infectious Diseases
- Fertility, Gynecology and Andrology
- Applied Psychology for Health Promotion
- Gene, Cell and Tissue
- Archives of Neuroscience
- Trends in Advanced Technologies in Medicine
- Care Pathway Hospital to Home
