= International Journal of Multicultural Education =

- Language: English
- Edited by: Soon-Yong Pak

Publication details
- Former name: Electronic Magazine of Multicultural Education
- Publisher: Loeb School of Education, Eastern University (United States)
- Frequency: Triannual

Standard abbreviations
- ISO 4: Int. J. Multicult. Educ.

Indexing
- ISSN: 1934-5267

Links
- Journal homepage

The International Journal of Multicultural Education (IJME) is a peer-reviewed open access academic journal published by the Loeb School of Education at Eastern University (St. Davids, Pennsylvania, United States).

The IJME was founded in 1999 as Electronic Magazine of Multicultural Education. It offers a forum in which scholars, practitioners and students of multicultural education share ideas to promote educational equity, cross-cultural understanding and global awareness in all levels of education.

The IJME publishes qualitative empirical research reports, articles that advance multicultural education scholarship, praxis essays relating successful education programs or practical ideas and strategies for instruction. It also publishes a variety of reviews, including those of visual arts, professional and children's books and multimedia resources.
