= Specialusis Ugdymas =

- Discipline: Special education
- Language: English

Publication details
- Frequency: Monthly

Standard abbreviations
- ISO 4: Spec. Ugdym.

Indexing
- ISSN: 1392-5369

Links
- Journal homepage

Specialusis Ugdymas is an academic journal. "Specialusis Ugdymas" is Lithuanian for "special education".
