= Ion I. Câmpineanu =

Romanian statesman

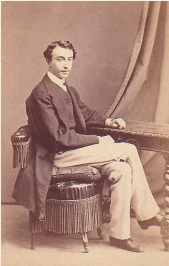

Minister of Justice
- In office January 27, 1877 – September 23, 1877
- Monarch: Carol I of Romania

Minister of Finance
- In office September 23, 1877 – November 25, 1878
- In office February 25, 1880 – July 15, 1880

Minister of Foreign Affairs
- In office November 25, 1878 – July 10, 1879
- Preceded by: Mihail Kogălniceanu
- Succeeded by: Vasile Boerescu
- In office February 2, 1885 – October 27, 1885
- Monarch: Carol I of Romania
- Preceded by: Dimitrie A. Sturdza
- Succeeded by: Ion Brătianu

Mayor of Bucharest
- In office November 1886 – April 1888
- Preceded by: Nicolae Manolescu
- Succeeded by: Emanoil Protopopescu-Pake

Personal details
- Born: October 10, 1841 Bucharest, Wallachia
- Died: November 13, 1888 (aged 47) Bucharest, Kingdom of Romania

Ion I. Câmpineanu (October 10, 1841 – November 13, 1888) was a Romanian statesman who served as the Minister of Justice from January 27, 1877, to September 23, 1877, Minister of Finance in two terms, from September 23, 1877, to November 25, 1878, and from February 25, 1880, to July 15, 1880, and Minister of Foreign Affairs from November 25, 1878, until July 10, 1879. He was one of the founders and most important members of the National Liberal Party.

After the proclamation of the Kingdom of Romania, Ion I. Câmpineanu was appointed the Minister of Foreign Affairs and held the office from February 2, 1885, until October 27, 1885. He was the Mayor of Bucharest from November 1886 to April 1888. He became the first Governor of the National Bank of Romania in July 1880, which he headed until his death on November 13, 1888.

His father was Ion Câmpineanu (1798–1863), a participant in the Wallachian Revolution of 1848. Câmpineanu was a member of the Macedo-Romanian Cultural Society.

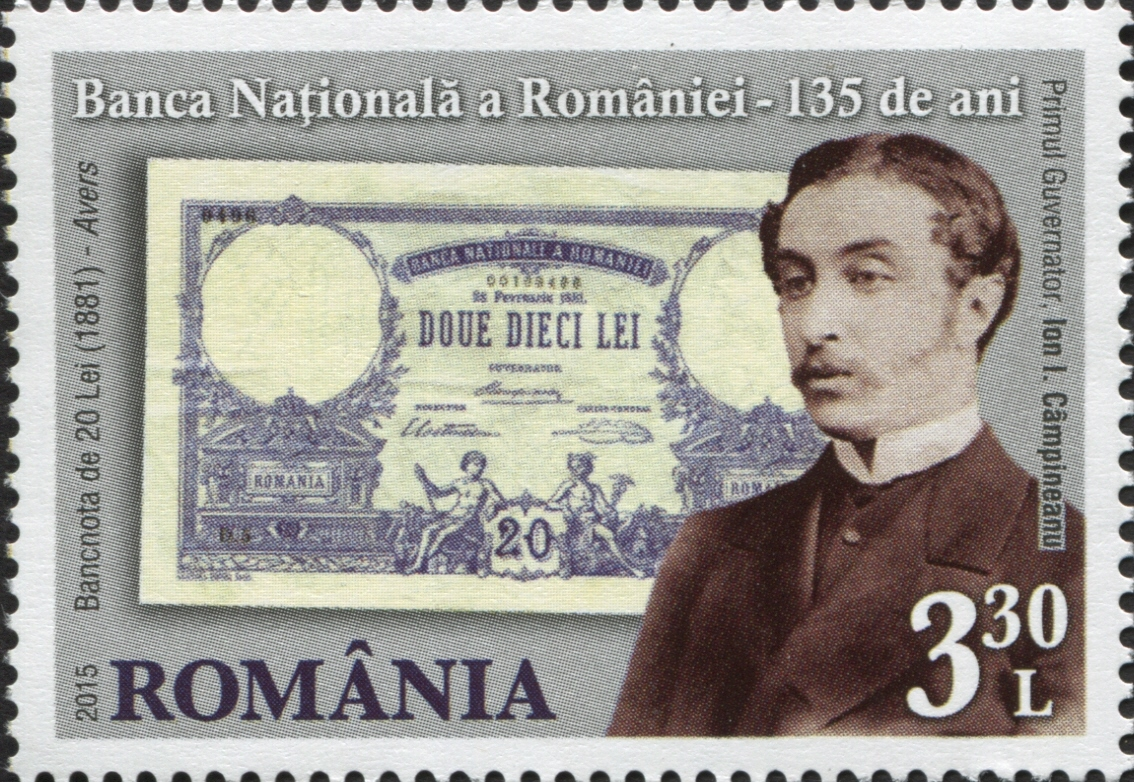
Romanian commemorative stamp depicting Câmpineanu

One of the central streets in Bucharest was named after Câmpineanu. In 2015, Poșta Română issued a 3.30 Lei stamp honoring Câmpineanu as the first Governor of the National Bank of Romania.
