= Ioan Alexandru Lapedatu =

Austro-Hungarian poet and writer

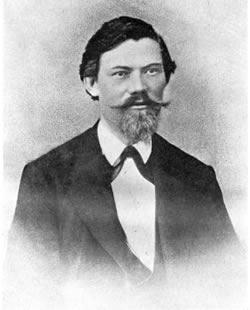
Ioan Alexandru Lapedatu

Ioan Alexandru Lapedatu (Romanian pronunciation: [iˈo̯an alekˈsandru lapeˈdatu]; July 6, 1844 – March 28, 1878) was an ethnic Romanian Austro-Hungarian poet, prose writer and newspaper contributor.

Born in Colun, Sibiu County, in the Transylvania region, his parents Alexa and Ana (née Panga) were peasants. He attended primary school in a nearby Hosman, followed by the Roman Catholic High School in Sibiu from 1860 to 1868. He received a scholarship from ASTRA to study philology at the University of Paris, which he did from 1868 to 1870, followed by the Free University of Brussels. He received a doctorate in philology and literature in 1871. A renowned professor of classical languages at Brașov's Orthodox High School, he came to be considered among the leading teachers in Transylvania. His first verses, which he wrote while in high school, appeared in Aurora română; he later contributed to magazines both in his native province and in the Romanian Old Kingdom: Albina Pindului, Familia, Revista literară și științifică, Timpul, Traian. He edited Orientul latin from 1874 to 1875 and Albina Carpaților from 1877 to 1878. He sometimes used the pseudonyms Narcis and Nouraș. He published two volumes: Încercări în literatură in 1874 and Asupra situațiunii in 1877. The short fiction he wrote in periodicals, particularly in Albina Carpaților, was published in the two-volume Nuvele istorice (1905–1906).

He was married twice; in 1876, his second wife bore twin sons Alexandru I. and Ion. He is buried in Brașov's Groaveri cemetery.
