= Journal of the West =

- Discipline: History, American History, Ethnohistory
- Language: English

Publication details
- History: 1962-present
- Publisher: ABC-CLIO (United States)

Standard abbreviations
- ISO 4: J. West

Indexing
- CODEN: JNLWA7
- ISSN: 0022-5169
- LCCN: 66084755
- OCLC no.: 60617157

Links
- Journal homepage

Journal of the West is a quarterly peer-reviewed academic journal covering the history and culture of the American West. Each issue of the journal is highlighted by a series of articles on a theme central to the history and life of the region. The journal is (was?) published by ABC-CLIO and, since 2004, the managing editor is Steven L. Danver.

== Hijacking ==
As of 2026, the journal has been hijacked. In other words, scammers took over the journal's expired domain and kept the site looking mostly the same. Inferior academics around the world pay the scammers money to publish their articles on topics nobody cares about with no fuss. In addition, the site features a very large number of fully AI-generated articles, probably to create the appearance that they are busy. The current table of contents features an extraordinary melange of wildly unrelated topics, while Danver is still listed as managing editor. The "archives" seem legit through Spring 2024, though the site demands money if you want to see any of those older (real) articles (SPOILER: you won't really get to see them). Issues after that feature only the crazy assortment of terrible, stupid, irrelevant papers. Tellingly, you are able to read these articles. If anyone paid money to these scammers to retrieve a true Journal of the West article, they would be ripped off.

| Issue | Publication date | Character of contents |
|---|---|---|
| Vol. 63, No. 2 | June 2024 | American Western history |
| Vol. 64, No. 1 | March 2025 | Ethiopian cinema, Iranian cinema, Arabic linguistics, architecture and other unrelated subjects |
| Vol. 64, No. 2 | December 2025 | Chinese cultural studies, children's literature, Algerian law and other subjects |
| Vol. 65, Nos. 1-3 | 2026 | An increasingly bizarre mixture of unrelated subjects, including numerous articles on acupressure |

== See Journal hijacking ==
More about how and why this happens:

Abalkina, A. (2024). Challenges posed by hijacked journals in Scopus. Journal of the Association for Information Science and Technology, 75(4), 395–422.

- Abalkina 2024
