= National Bank of Romania =

Central bank of Romania

National Bank of Romania Banca Națională a României

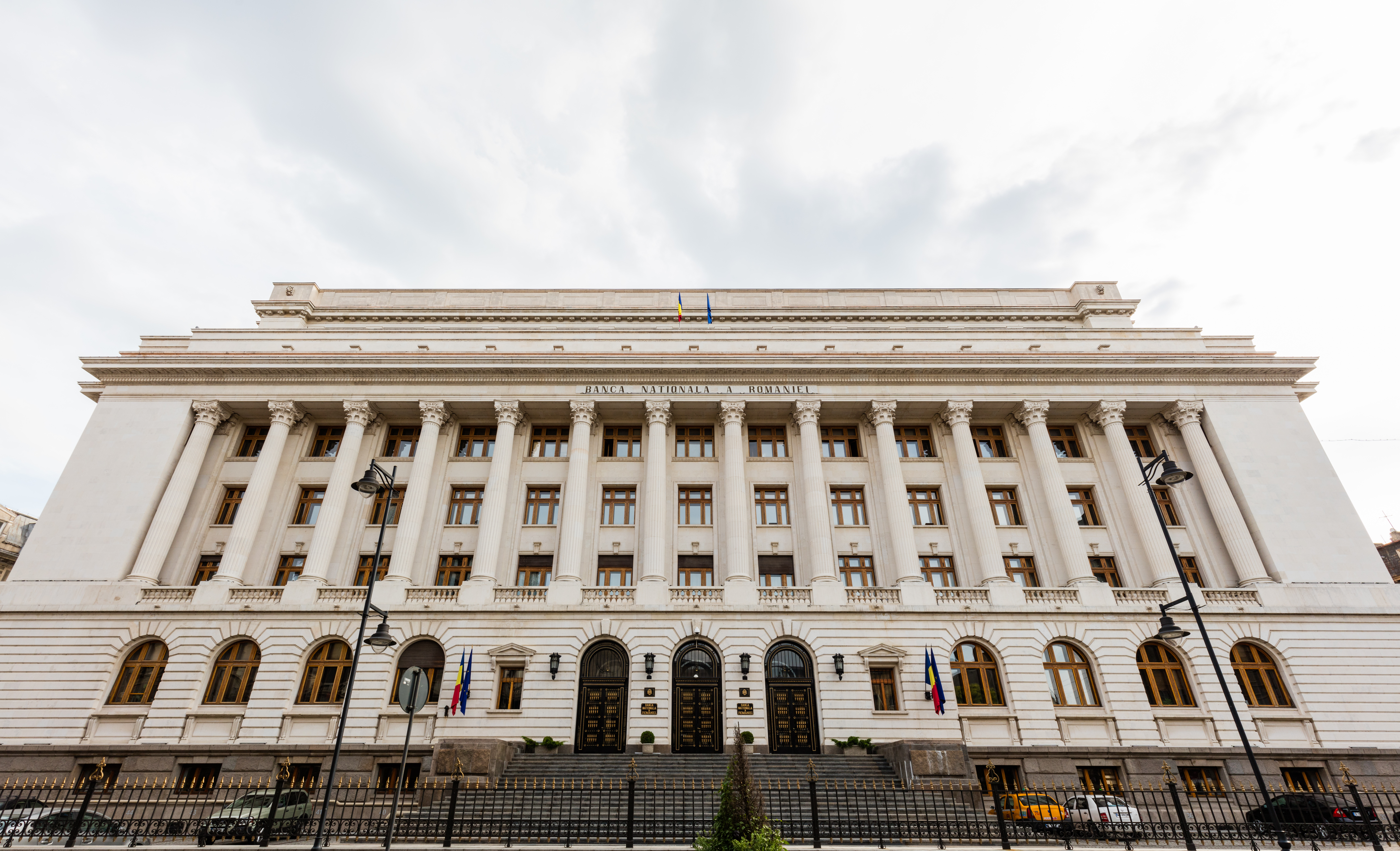
- BNR headquarters in Bucharest
- Central bank of: Romania
- Headquarters: Bucharest
- Coordinates: 44°25′59″N 26°5′59″E
- Established: 29 April 1880
- Ownership: State ownership
- Governor: Mugur Isărescu
- Currency: Romanian leu RON (ISO 4217)
- Reserves: ▼€60.060 billion (September 2026)
- Bank rate: 6.50%
- Interest on reserves: 5.50%
- Website: www.bnr.ro

The National Bank of Romania (Romanian: Banca Națională a României, BNR) is the central bank of Romania, established on 29 April 1880 and headquartered in Bucharest. It is responsible for maintaining price stability by formulating and implementing monetary policy, issuing the Romanian leu, managing foreign exchange reserves, and supervising the banking system.

Under European Union policy frameworks, the BNR is a voting member of the Board of Supervisors of the European Banking Authority (EBA). European Insurance and Occupational Pensions Authority (EIOPA), and European Securities and Markets Authority (ESMA). It also provides the permanent single common representative for Romania in the Supervisory composition of the General Board of the Anti-Money Laundering Authority (AMLA). It is also a member of the European Systemic Risk Board (ESRB).

== History ==
The bank's first governor was Ion Câmpineanu. Eugeniu Carada is associated to the National Bank, as he was the founder of the bank and he was elected director of the bank, but he never accepted the role of Governor.

In 1916, in the wake of the Central Powers' invasion, the valuables of the National Bank of Romania, together with many other valuables (the Romanian Treasure) were sent to Moscow for safekeeping, but were never returned (except for the Pietroasele treasure - now on display at the National Museum of Romanian History, the numismatic collection of the National Bank, some paintings and archives).

On 28 July 1959, an armed group of six Jewish Romanian, members of the Romanian Communist Party apparatus (the Ioanid Gang: Alexandru Ioanid, Paul Ioanid, Igor Sevianu, Monica Sevianu, Sașa Mușat and Haralambie Obedeanu) were alleged to have stolen from an armored car of the National Bank of Romania 1,600,000 lei (about 250,000 U.S. dollars at 1959 prices). It was allegedly the most famous bank robbery in the Eastern bloc. Beyond accusations based on various ideological guidelines, no reasons for the alleged robbery, or for the Ioanid group to have perpetrated it, were ever given at the trial.

Although the persons on trial were accused of intending to donate the money to Zionist organizations that would send Romanian Jews to Israel, the stolen sum was in lei, which at the time could not be exchanged for hard currency anywhere in the world. All these aspects, together with the numerous cases of sentences based on false accusations, have led most persons to doubt that any robbery actually took place or that those charged with the crime committed it.

On 11 June 2021, Mugur Isărescu and Octavian Armașu, governor of the National Bank of Moldova, renewed the cooperation agreement between the two central banks, expanding collaboration in institutional capacity building, supervision, crisis management, payment service providers and e-money issuers, and financial market infrastructure.

== Architecture ==
=== The Old BNR Palace ===
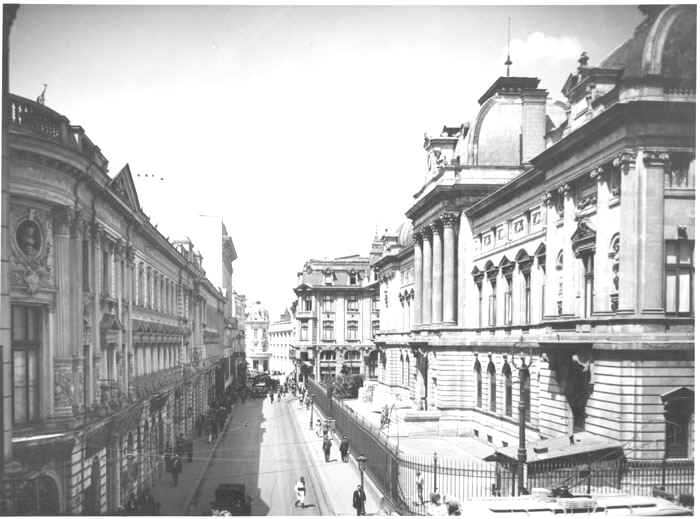
The Headquarters of the National Bank of Romania in the 1920s (Lipscani Street).

The head office of the National Bank of Romania with the view of Lipscani Street is one of the most imposing and massive bank edifices in Romania, nowadays a historic, art monument, and protected as such. It was erected on the former site of the inn built by Șerban Cantacuzino (1678–1688).

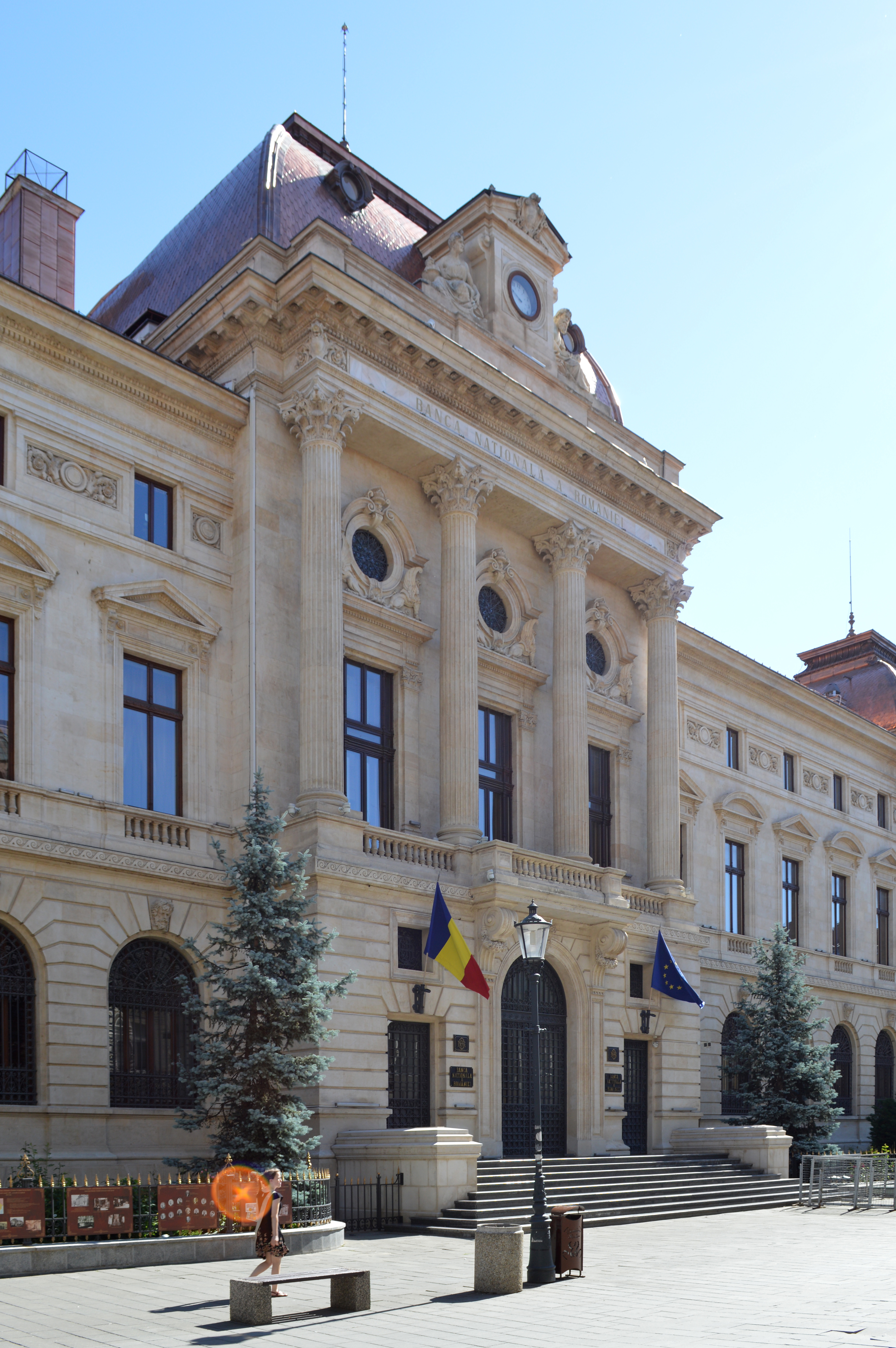
Old National Bank building, 2017.

On 26 February 1882, architects Cassien Bernard and Albert Galleron were assigned the task to blueprint the BNR Palace. The construction of the building in the eclectic style of the late 19th century, with some neo-classical elements, proceeded between 12 July 1884 (when the foundation stone was laid) and June 1890 under the direction of the architect engineer Nicolae Cerchez assisted by architect E. Băicoianu.

=== The New BNR Palace ===
With the façade on Doamnei Street, the new wing of the BNR Palace was built during World War II, after having laid the foundation stone back in 1937.

The construction works carried on between 1942-44 under the direction of architect Ion Davidescu assisted by two other architects, Radu Dudescu and N. Crețoiu.

The building is emblematic of the neo-classical style with rationalist influences that prevailed in the interwar period. It impresses by the monumental granite stairs, the huge Corinthian columns forming the façade, and the large, white marble-coated halls inside the building.

== Responsibilities ==
The main tasks of the National Bank of Romania are the following:

- to define and implement the monetary policy and the exchange rate policy;
- to conduct the authorisation, regulation and prudential supervision of credit institutions and to promote and oversee the smooth operation of the payment systems with a view to ensuring financial stability;
- to issue banknotes and coins as legal tender on the territory of Romania;
- to set the exchange rate regime and to supervise its observance;
- to manage the official reserves of Romania.

== Gallery ==
National Bank of Romania

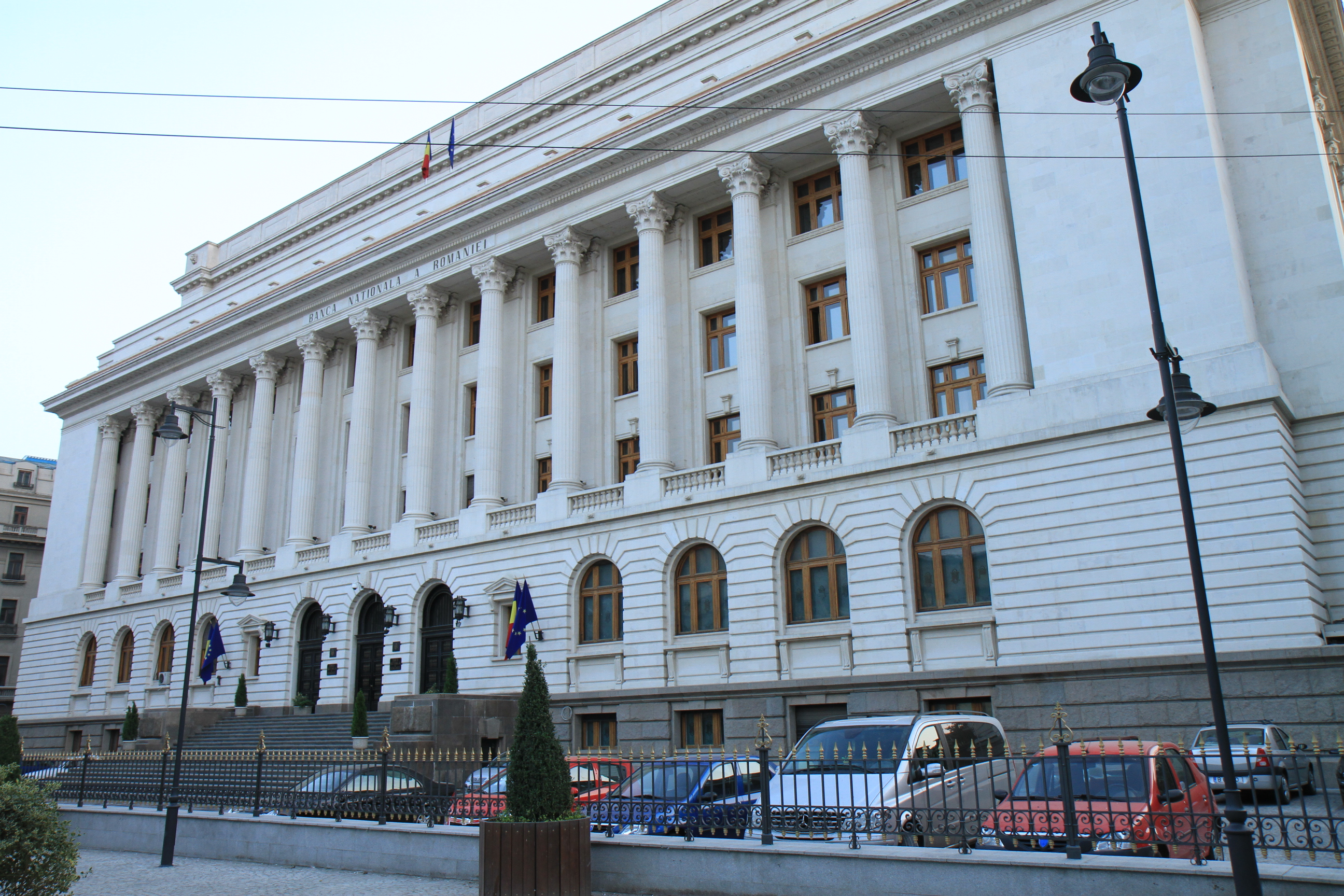

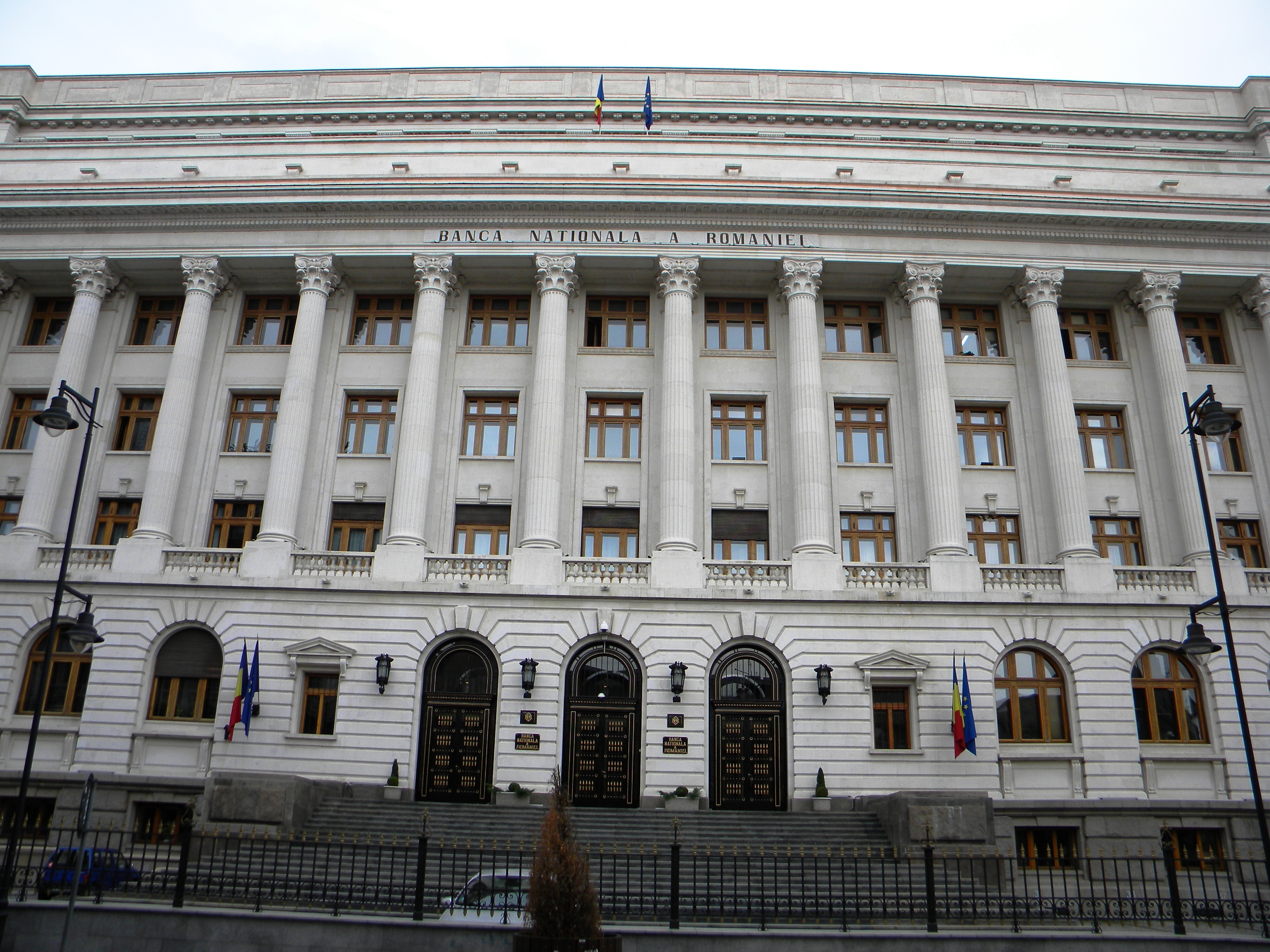

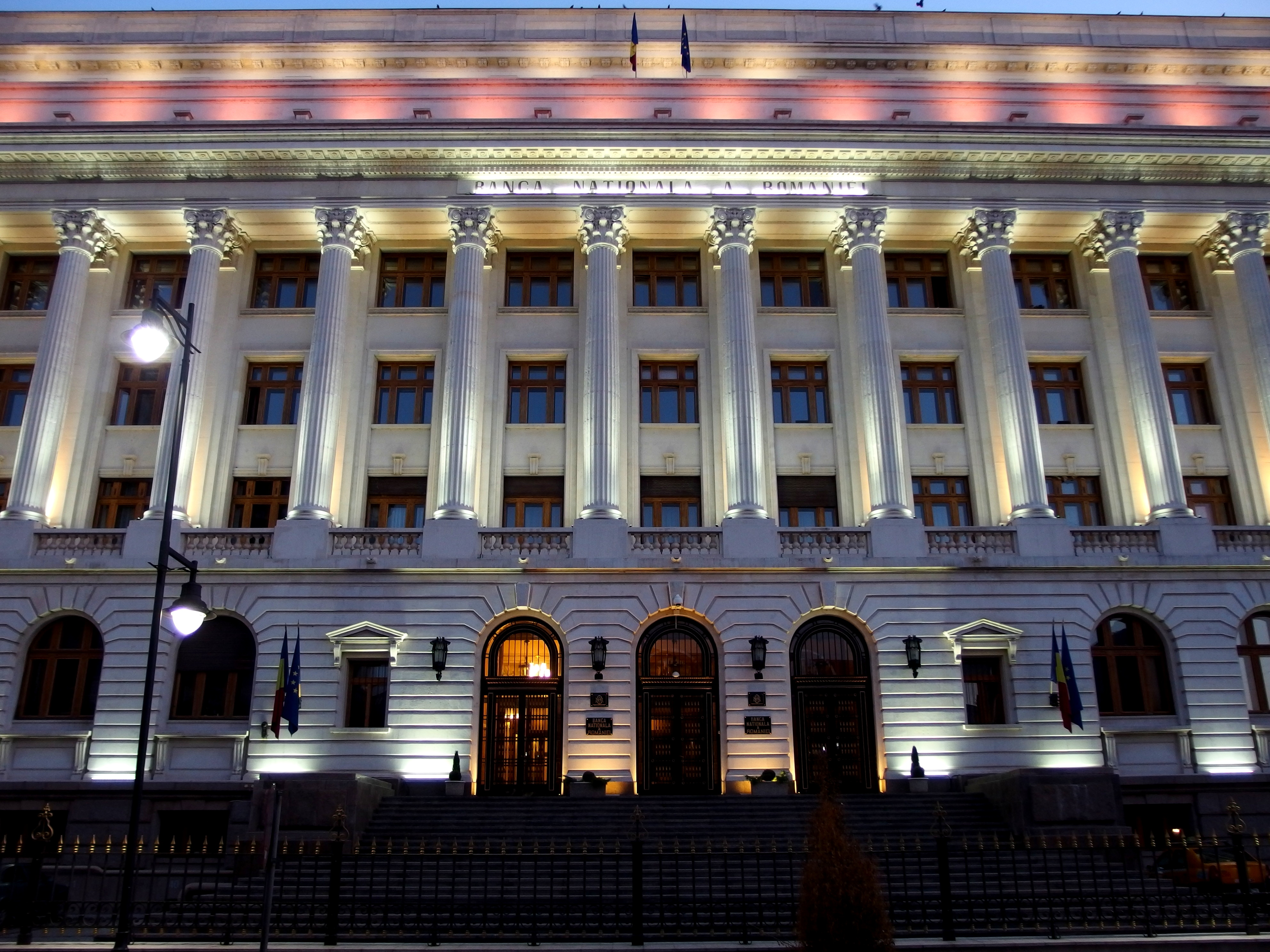

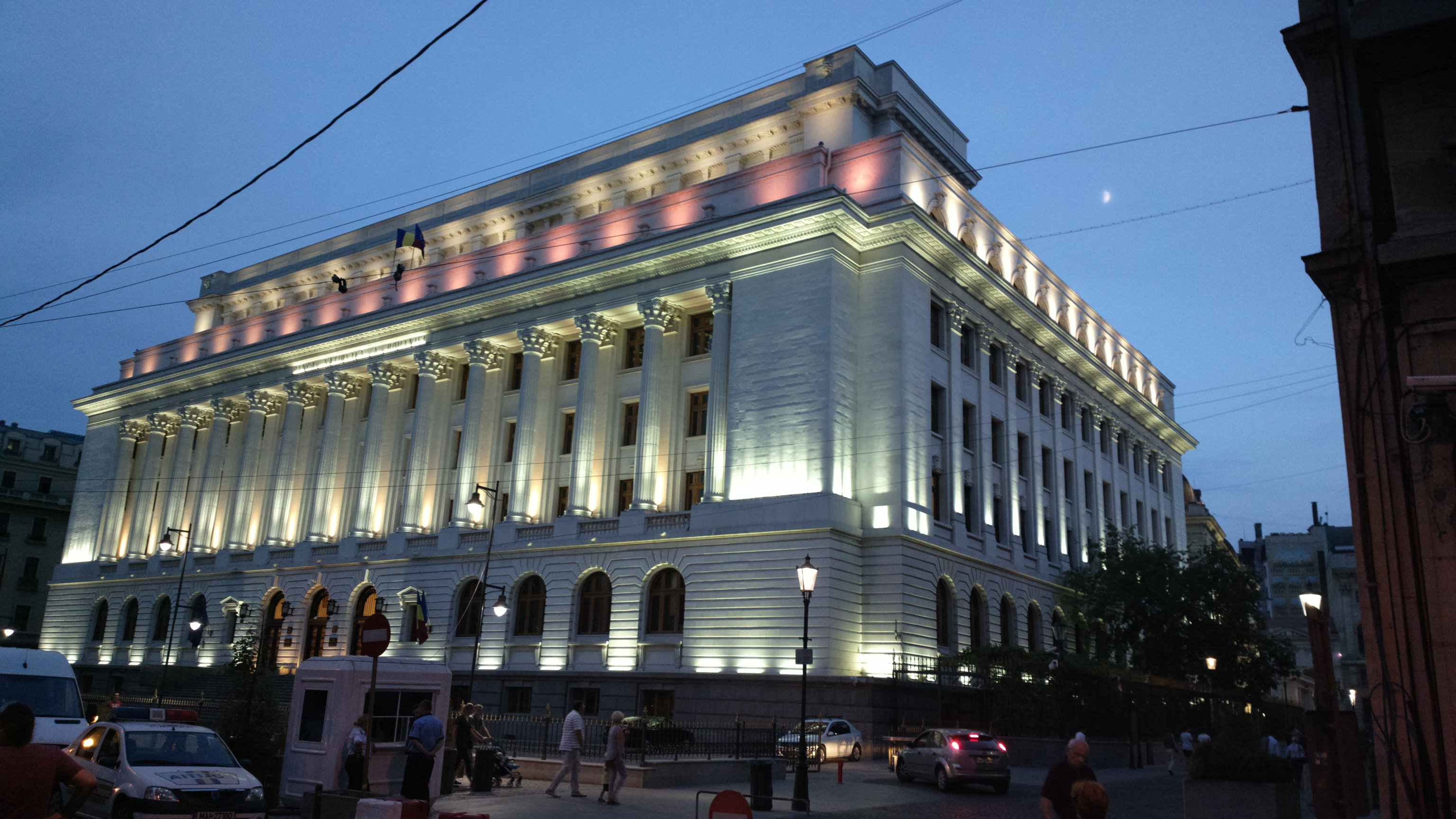

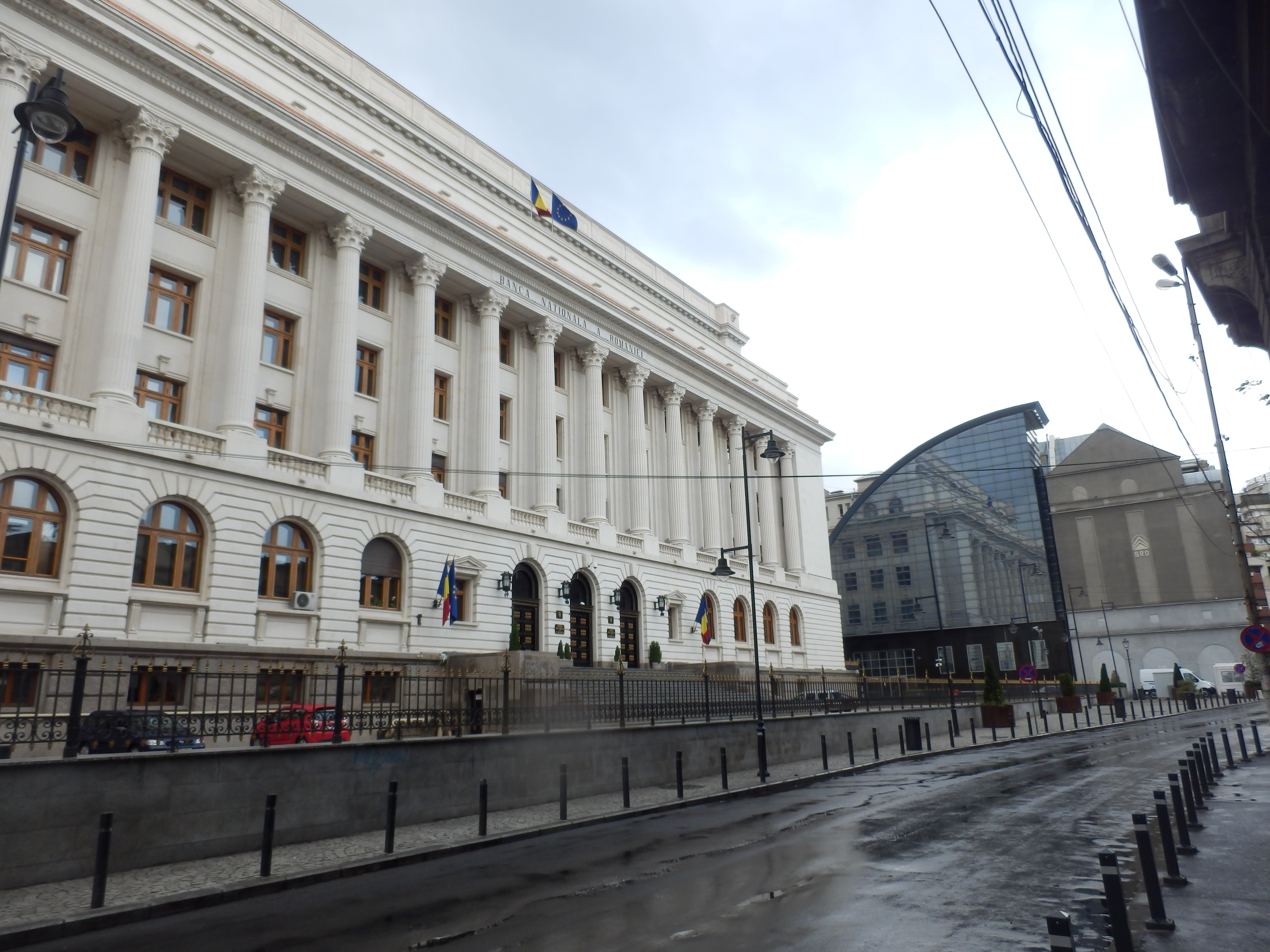

== See also ==
- Economy of Romania
- Romanian leu
- Romanian Treasure, Romanian gold reserves (alongside other valuable objects) sent to Russia for safekeeping in 1916 (during World War I) which haven't yet returned (as of 2026)
- List of central banks
- List of financial supervisory authorities by country
