= List of members of the European Parliament for Romania, 2007 =

Members of the European Parliament for Romania
Observers	(2005)
Delegation	(2007)
6th term	(2007)
7th term	(2009)
8th term	(2014)
9th term	(2019)

This is a list of the 35 appointed members of the European Parliament for Romania in the 2004 to 2009 session, from 1 January 2007 to 20 May 2007.

== List ==
Name	National party	EP Group
Roberta Alma Anastase	Democratic Party	EPP–ED
Alexandru Athanasiu	Social Democratic Party	PES
Tiberiu Bărbuleţiu	National Liberal Party	ALDE
Daniela Buruiană	Greater Romania Party	IST
Silvia Ciornei	Conservative Party	ALDE
Adrian Cioroianu	National Liberal Party	ALDE
Titus Corlăţean	Social Democratic Party	PES
Mircea Coşea	National Liberal Party	ALDE
Corina Creţu	Social Democratic Party	PES
Gabriela Creţu	Social Democratic Party	PES
Vasile Dîncu	Social Democratic Party	PES
Cristian Dumitrescu	Social Democratic Party	PES
Ovidiu Ganț	Democratic Forum of Germans in Romania	EPP–ED
Eduard Hellvig	Conservative Party	ALDE
Attila Kelemen	Democratic Union of Hungarians in Romania	EPP–ED
Sándor Konya-Hamar	Democratic Union of Hungarians in Romania	EPP–ED
Marian-Jean Marinescu	Democratic Party	EPP–ED
Eugen Mihăescu	Greater Romania Party	IST
Dan Mihalache	Social Democratic Party	PES
Viorica Moisuc	Greater Romania Party	IST
Alexandru Morţun	National Liberal Party	ALDE
Ioan Paşcu	Social Democratic Party	PES
Maria Petre	Democratic Party	EPP–ED
Radu Podgorean	Social Democratic Party	PES
Petre Popeangă	Greater Romania Party	IST
Monica Ridzi	Democratic Party	EPP–ED
Daciana Sârbu	Social Democratic Party	PES
Gheorghe Șerbu	National Liberal Party	ALDE
Adrian Severin	Social Democratic Party	PES
Ovidiu Silaghi	National Liberal Party	ALDE
Cristian Stănescu	Greater Romania Party	IST
Károly Szabó	Democratic Union of Hungarians in Romania	EPP–ED
Silvia Ţicău	Social Democratic Party	PES
Radu Ţîrle	Democratic Party	EPP–ED
Adina Vălean	National Liberal Party	ALDE
