= List of observers to the European Parliament for Romania, 2005–2006 =

Members of the European Parliament for Romania
Observers	(2005)
Delegation	(2007)
6th term	(2007)
7th term	(2009)
8th term	(2014)
9th term	(2019)

This is a list of the 35 observers to the European Parliament for Romania in the 2004 to 2009 session. They were appointed by the Chamber of Deputies to be observers from 25 September 2005 until 31 December 2006 (one day before the accession of Romania to the European Union). The observers group included 9 women. 12 of them joined EPP-ED, 12 joined PES, 7 joined ALDE, while the rest remained Non-Inscrits.

== List ==
Name	National party	EP Group
Roberta Alma Anastase	Democratic Party	EPP–ED
Alexandru Athanasiu	Social Democratic Party	PES
Tiberiu Bărbuleţiu	National Liberal Party	ALDE
Dumitru Becșenescu	Conservative Party	ALDE
Daniela Buruiană	Greater Romania Party	NI
Silvia Ciornei	Conservative Party	ALDE
Adrian Cioroianu	National Liberal Party	ALDE
Titus Corlăţean	Social Democratic Party	PES
Mircea Coşea	National Liberal Party	ALDE
Corina Creţu	Social Democratic Party	PES
Gabriela Creţu	Social Democratic Party	PES
Vasile Dîncu	Social Democratic Party	PES
Cristian Dumitrescu	Social Democratic Party	PES
Viorel Senior Duca	Greater Romania Party	NI
Ovidiu Ganț	Democratic Forum of Germans in Romania	EPP–ED
Vlad Hogea	Greater Romania Party	NI
Monica Iacob Ridzi	Social Democratic Party	PES
Attila Kelemen	Democratic Union of Hungarians in Romania	EPP–ED
Sándor Konya-Hamar	Democratic Union of Hungarians in Romania	EPP–ED
Marian-Jean Marinescu	Democratic Party	EPP–ED
Eugen Mihăescu	Greater Romania Party	NI
Alexandru Morţun	National Liberal Party	ALDE
Mona Musca	National Liberal Party	ALDE
Șerban Nicolae	Social Democratic Party	PES
Ioan Paşcu	Social Democratic Party	PES
Maria Petre	Democratic Party	EPP–ED
Radu Podgorean	Social Democratic Party	PES
Nicolae-Vlad Popa	Democratic Party	EPP–ED
Petre Popeangă	Greater Romania Party	NI
Daciana Sârbu	Social Democratic Party	PES
Adrian Severin	Social Democratic Party	PES
Ovidiu Silaghi	National Liberal Party	ALDE
Károly Szabó	Democratic Union of Hungarians in Romania	EPP–ED
Radu Ţîrle	Democratic Party	EPP–ED
Valeriu Zgonea	Social Democratic Party	PES

== Sources ==
- "Observers from Bulgaria and Romania". europarl.europa.eu. European Parliament. 2005-11-24. Archived from the original on 2019-06-05.
