= List of members of the European Parliament for Romania, 2014–2019 =

Members of the European Parliament for Romania
Observers	(2005)
Delegation	(2007)
6th term	(2007)
7th term	(2009)
8th term	(2014)
9th term	(2019)

This is a list of the 32 members of the European Parliament for Romania in the 2014 to 2019 session.

== List ==
Name	National party	EP group
Victor Boștinaru	Social Democratic Party	S&D
Daniel Buda	National Liberal Party	EPP
Cristian Bușoi	National Liberal Party	EPP
Corina Crețu (2014)	Social Democratic Party	S&D
Andi Cristea	Social Democratic Party	S&D
Viorica Dăncilă (2014–2018)	Social Democratic Party	S&D
Mircea Diaconu	Independent	ALDE
Damian Drăghici	Independent	S&D
Doru-Claudian Frunzulică	Social Democratic Party	S&D
Maria Grapini	Conservative Party	S&D
Eduard Hellvig (2014–2015)	National Liberal Party	EPP
Cătălin Ivan	Social Democratic Party	S&D
Monica Macovei	M10	ECR
Marian-Jean Marinescu	National Liberal Party	EPP
Ramona Mănescu	National Liberal Party	EPP
Sorin Moisă	Social Democratic Party	S&D
Siegfried Mureșan	National Liberal Party	EPP
Victor Negrescu (2014–2017)	Social Democratic Party	S&D
Dan Nica	Social Democratic Party	S&D
Norica Nicolai	Alliance of Liberals and Democrats	ALDE
Ioan Mircea Paşcu	Social Democratic Party	S&D
Emilian Pavel (2014–)	Social Democratic Party	S&D
Răzvan Popa (2017–)	Social Democratic Party	S&D
Cristian Preda	Independent	EPP
Laurențiu Rebega	Independent	NI
Daciana Sârbu	Social Democratic Party	S&D
Theodor Stolojan	National Liberal Party	EPP
Csaba Sógor	Democratic Union of Hungarians in Romania	EPP
Claudiu Ciprian Tănăsescu	Greater Romania Party	NI
Ana-Claudia Țapardel	Social Democratic Party	S&D
Mihai Țurcanu (2015–)	National Liberal Party	ALDE
Traian Ungureanu	National Liberal Party	EPP
Adina-Ioana Vălean	National Liberal Party	EPP
Renate Weber	Alliance of Liberals and Democrats	ALDE
Iuliu Winkler	Democratic Union of Hungarians in Romania	EPP
Gabriela Zoană	Social Democratic Party	S&D
