= List of members of the European Parliament for Romania, 2009–2014 =

Members of the European Parliament for Romania
Observers	(2005)
Delegation	(2007)
6th term	(2007)
7th term	(2009)
8th term	(2014)
9th term	(2019)

This is a list of the 33 members of the European Parliament for Romania in the 2009 to 2014 session.

== List ==
Name	National party	EP group
Elena Antonescu	Democratic Liberal Party	EPP
Elena Băsescu	Democratic Liberal Party (Independent)	EPP
George Becali (until 18 December 2012) Dan Zamfirescu (from 9 January 2013)	Greater Romania Party	NI
Sebastian Bodu	Democratic Liberal Party	EPP
Victor Boştinaru	Social Democratic Party	S&D
Cristian Buşoi (until 26 June 2013) Eduard Hellvig (from 4 September 2013)	National Liberal Party	ALDE
Corina Creţu	Social Democratic Party	S&D
Sabin Cutaş	Conservative Party	S&D
Vasilica Dăncilă	Social Democratic Party	S&D
Ioan Enciu	Social Democratic Party	S&D
Cătălin Ivan	Social Democratic Party	S&D
Petru Luhan	Democratic Liberal Party	EPP
Monica Macovei	Democratic Liberal Party	EPP
Marian-Jean Marinescu	Democratic Liberal Party	EPP
Roberto Dietrich Ovidiu Silaghi (from 4 September 2013 to 10 June 2014) Ramona Mănescu (from 14 July 2009)	National Liberal Party	ALDE
Iosif Matula	Democratic Liberal Party	EPP
Norica Nicolai	National Liberal Party	ALDE
Rareş Niculescu	Democratic Liberal Party	EPP
Ioan Mircea Paşcu	Social Democratic Party	S&D
Rovana Plumb (until 6 May 2012) Minodora Cliveti (from 18 May 2012)	Social Democratic Party	S&D
Cristian Preda	Democratic Liberal Party (until 8 December 2013) Independent (until 2 February 2014) People's Movement Party	EPP
Daciana Octavia Sârbu	Social Democratic Party	S&D
Adrian Severin	Social Democratic Party	S&D (until 22 March 2011) NI
Theodor Stolojan	Democratic Liberal Party	EPP
Csaba Sógor	Democratic Union of Hungarians in Romania	EPP
László Tőkés	Democratic Union of Hungarians in Romania (until 20 January 2014) Independent	EPP
Claudiu Ciprian Tănăsescu	Greater Romania Party (until 14 November 2010) Social Democratic Party	NI (until 14 November 2010) S&D
Silvia Adriana Ţicău	Social Democratic Party	S&D
Traian Ungureanu	Democratic Liberal Party	EPP
Corneliu Vadim-Tudor	Greater Romania Party	NI
Adina Ioana Vălean	National Liberal Party	ALDE
Renate Weber	National Liberal Party	ALDE
Gyula Winkler	Democratic Union of Hungarians in Romania	EPP
