= List of members of the European Parliament for Romania, 2019–2024 =

This is a list of the 32 members of the European Parliament for Romania in the 2019 to 2024 session. 33rd member was added after Brexit.

Members of the European Parliament for Romania
Observers	(2005)
Delegation	(2007)
6th term	(2007)
7th term	(2009)
8th term	(2014)
9th term	(2019)

These MEPs were elected at the 2019 European Parliament election in Romania.

== List ==
On the National Liberal Party list: (EPP Group)

1. Rareș Bogdan
2. Mircea Hava
3. Siegfried Mureșan
4. Vasile Blaga
5. Adina Vălean – until 30 November 2019
  Vlad Nistor – since 2 December 2019
6. Daniel Buda
7. Dan Motreanu
8. Gheorghe Falcă
9. Cristian Bușoi
10. Marian-Jean Marinescu

On the Social Democratic Party list: (S&D)

1. Rovana Plumb
2. Carmen Avram
3. Claudiu Manda
4. Cristian Terheș (since 12 May 2020 PNȚCD and ECR)
5. Dan Nica
6. Maria Grapini
7. Tudor Ciuhodaru
8. Dragoș Benea
9. Victor Negrescu – since 1 February 2020

On the Freedom, Unity and Solidarity Party+Save Romania Union list: (Renew)

1. Dacian Cioloș (PLUS)
2. Cristian Ghinea (USR) - until 23 December 2020
  Alin Mituța (PLUS) - since 28 December 2020
3. Dragoș Pîslaru (PLUS)
4. Clotilde Armand (USR) - until 3 November 2020
  Vlad Gheorghe (USR) - since 10 November 2020
5. Dragoș Tudorache (PLUS)
6. Nicolae Ștefănuță (USR)
7. Vlad Botoș (USR)
8. Ramona Strugariu (PLUS)

On the PRO Romania list: (S&D)

1. Corina Crețu
2. Mihai Tudose (since January 2020 PSD)

On the Democratic Alliance of Hungarians in Romania list: (EPP Group)

1. Iuliu Winkler
2. Lóránt Vincze

On the People's Movement Party list: (EPP Group)

1. Traian Băsescu
2. Eugen Tomac

== See also ==
- List of members of the European Parliament, 2019–2024
- 2019 European Parliament election
- Politics of Portugal
