= Norica =

Norica is a Romanian feminine given name. Notable people with the given name include:

- Norica Câmpean (born 1972), Romanian race walker
- Norica Nicolai (born 1958), Romanian lawyer and politician
