= Criștioru de Jos =

- Commune
- Location in Bihor County

- Location in Romania
- Coordinates: 46°26′N 22°32′E
- Country: Romania
- County: Bihor

Government
  - Mayor (2020–2024): Fănel Tulvan (PNL)
- Area: 105.76 km^{2} (40.83 sq mi)
- Elevation: 401 m (1,316 ft)
- Population (2021-12-01): 1,154
  - Density: 11/km^{2} (28/sq mi)
- Time zone: EET/EEST (UTC+2/+3)
- Postal code: 417215
- Area code: +(40) x59
- Vehicle reg.: BH
- Website: primariacristiorudejos.ro

Criștioru de Jos (Hungarian: Alsóbiharkristyór) is a commune in Bihor County, Crișana, Romania with a population of 1,154 people. It is composed of five villages: Bâlc, Criștioru de Jos, Criștioru de Sus (Felsőbiharkristyór), Poiana (Biharmező), and Săliște de Vașcău (Vaskohszeleste).

== Natives ==
- Radu Țârle (born 1967), politician
