= Ioan Enciu =

Romanian politician

Ioan Enciu MEP

Member of the European Parliament for Romania
- Incumbent
- Assumed office 8 June 2009 Serving with 32 others

Personal details
- Born: 14 April 1953 (age 72) Odorheiu Secuiesc, Romania
- Party: Social Democratic Party (Romania)

Ioan Enciu (born 14 April 1953) is a Romanian politician, who, since the 2009 election has been a Member of the European Parliament for Romania, representing the Social Democratic Party. He sits, along with his party colleagues in the Progressive Alliance of Socialists and Democrats group.

== Background ==
In 1976 he graduated from the Faculty of Hydrotechnics at the Institute of Construction. In 2003 he graduated from Faculty of Management, Academy of Economic Studies. Prior to entering politics he served in several consulting and management roles. He was also a local councillor in Bucharest from 1996 to 2007.

== Parliamentary Activities ==
He serves on the following Parliamentary committees:

- Committee on Civil Liberties, Justice and Home Affairs
- Delegation for relations with Canada

He previously served on the Committee on Industry, Research and Energy and the Special Committee on Organised Crime, Corruption and Money Laundering
