= Gheorghe Vergil Șerbu =

Romanian politician

Gheorghe Vergil Şerbu (born 29 March 1949) is a Romanian politician and Member of the European Parliament. Şerbu is a member of the National Liberal Party, part of the Alliance of Liberals and Democrats for Europe, and became an MEP on 1 January 2007 with the accession of Romania to the European Union.
