= Silvia Ciornei =

Romanian politician (born 1970)

Silvia Ciornei (born 27 August 1970 in Ploiești) is a Romanian politician who served as Member of the European Parliament. She is a member of the Conservative Party, part of the Alliance of Liberals and Democrats for Europe, and became an MEP on 1 January 2007 with the accession of Romania to the European Union.
