= Tiberiu Bărbulețiu =

Romanian politician

Tiberiu Bărbulețiu (born 1 December 1963 in Blaj) is a Romanian politician. He is a member of the National Liberal Party. He was a member of the Romanian Chamber of Deputies between 2004 and 2008, and was also a Member of the European Parliament from 2007 to 2009, part of the Alliance of Liberals and Democrats for Europe.
