= Iuliu Winkler =

Romanian engineer, economist and politician

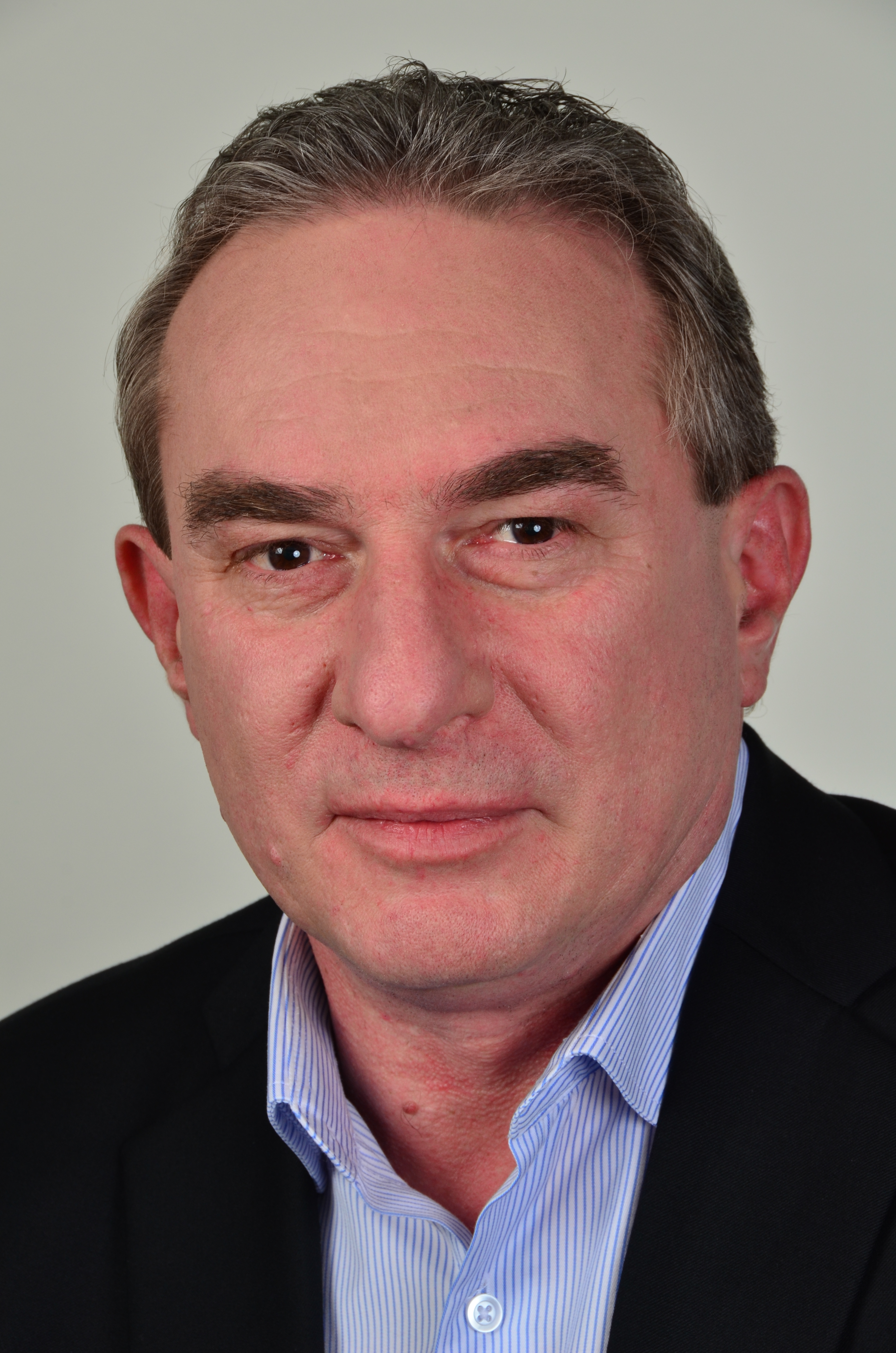
Official portrait, 2014

Iuliu Winkler (born 14 March 1964) is a Romanian engineer, economist and politician. A member of the Democratic Union of Hungarians in Romania (UDMR), he was a member of the Romanian Chamber of Deputies for Hunedoara County from 2000 to 2004. In the Călin Popescu-Tăriceanu cabinet, he was Minister-Delegate for Commerce from December 2004 to April 2007, and Minister of Communications and Information Society from July to December 2007. Since that time, he has been a Member of the European Parliament (MEP).

== Biography ==
He was born to ethnic Hungarian parents in Hunedoara and holds two graduate degrees. He obtained the first in 1988 from the Electrical Engineering Faculty of the Traian Vuia Polytechnic Institute of Timișoara, with a specialty in electronics and telecommunications. He received the second in 2001 from the Science Faculty of the University of Petroșani, in finance and insurance. From 1988 to 1992, Winkler worked as an engineer at a telecommunications assembly factory in Hunedoara, including as coordinating metrologist from 1990. From 1993 to 1998 he was the delegate for a private property fund. From 1996 to 1999 he was director of development at a Hunedoara construction firm.

Winkler joined the UDMR in 1991, joining its municipal bureau in his native city in 1994 and its Hunedoara County chapter bureau in 1996. Since 2000, he has sat on the party's representative's council, and has belonged to its permanent council since 2007. From 2000 to 2001, he was vice president of its Hunedoara County chapter, and has been president since that year. His first elective office was on the Hunedoara County Council from 1996 to 1999. Then from 1999 to 2000, he was deputy prefect of the county. Elected to the Chamber in 2000, while there he was on the committees for budget, finance and banks (2000–2004) and European integration (2003–2004). He had two stints in the Tăriceanu cabinet: as Minister-Delegate for Commerce (2004–2007), serving until the position was eliminated, and as Communications and IT Minister (2007). In the months between, he was secretary of state for commerce at the Ministry of Small and Medium Enterprises, Commerce and Business Environment. Elected to the European Parliament in 2007, 2009 and 2014, he sits on that body's Committee on International Trade.

He is married and has one child.
