= Radu Podgorean =

Romanian politician

Member of the European Parliament
- In office 1 January 2007 – 9 December 2007
- Parliamentary group: Socialists and Democrats

Member of the Chamber of Deputies
- In office 2000–2008
- Constituency: Sibiu County

Personal details
- Born: 22 March 1955 (age 71) Bucharest, Romania
- Citizenship: Romanian
- Party: Social Democratic Party
- Occupation: Politician

Radu Podgorean (born 22 March 1955 in Bucharest) is a Romanian politician. From 2000 to 2008, he represented Sibiu County in the Chamber of Deputies. During 2007, he served as a Member of the European Parliament. He is a member of the Social Democratic Party, part of the Party of European Socialists, and became an MEP on 1 January 2007 with the accession of Romania to the European Union. He was on the Committee of Agriculture and Rural Development, Committee for Petitions, and Delegation for Relations with Iran.
