= Sorin Moisă =

Romanian politician

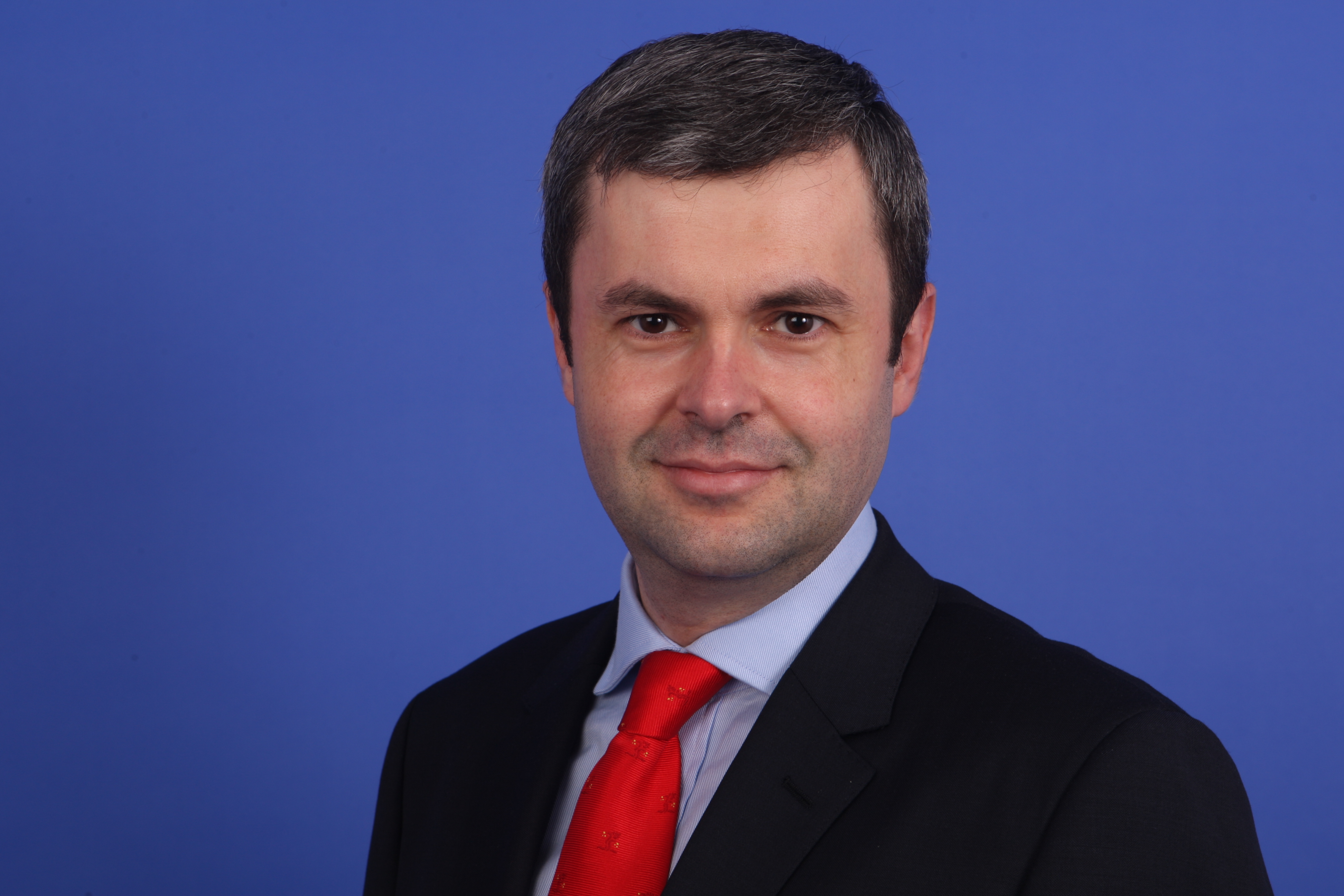
Sorin Moisă, Member of the European Parliament

Ionel Sorin Moisa (born 1976) is an independent Romanian politician who served as a Member of the European Parliament (MEP) during the 2014–2019 legislature. The Romanian press also floated his name as possible Prime Minister on several occasions.

He was elected on the ticket of the Social Democratic Party (Romania) (PSD), but left that party to become an independent in November 2017, citing concerns that under the leadership of Liviu Dragnea the party was slipping towards nationalism and populism reminiscent of the communist era. In the European Parliament he was a member of the Socialists and Democrats (S&D) group until November 2017, when he joined the centre-right European People’s Party (EPP) as an independent following his resignation from the PSD. Moisa was selected twice, in 2016 and 2017, by Politico Europe, as one of the most influential 40 MEPs, ranking 31st each time.

Before being elected to the European Parliament, he was Deputy Head of Cabinet of EU Agriculture Commissioner Dacian Cioloș (2010–2014), Political Advisor of the European Commission Delegation in Romania (2002–2006), and a journalist with the Monitorul network (1997–2002).

== European politics ==
In the European Parliament, Moisa served in the International Trade Committee and the Delegation for Relations with the United States of America. He was also Chairman of the Friends of Singapore Group in the European Parliament.

As an S&D MEP, he was responsible for the Comprehensive Economic and Trade Agreement (CETA) between the European Union and Canada within his political group.

CETA was controversial in Europe and had a tortuous ratification process, being seen as a precursor to the Transatlantic Trade and Investment Partnership (TTIP), the mammoth agreement between the EU and the USA.

Moisa is also widely credited for having successfully negotiated, as part of the CETA political package, the removal of the visa regime for Romanians (and Bulgarians) travelling to Canada on tourism or business. On this issue he worked in close coordination with the Romanian government of the day, run by Prime Minister Dacian Ciolos. In April 2016 he resigned as CETA Rapporteur for the S&D Group in the European Parliament in protest over what he called ‘Canada's disappointing and unjust behaviour on the issue of visas.’ The Canadian press noted his resignation as a ‘straining allies Canada needs to pass trade deal’. He resumed that role after in October 2016 Canada accepted to fully remove visas on 1 December 2017.

As Chairman of the Friends of Singapore Group in the European Parliament, he championed the cause of the much-delayed EU-Singapore Free Trade Agreement, with Singapore seen as a key economic and strategic partner for the EU. His contribution to achieving ratification by the European Parliament was publicly acknowledged by the Singapore Minister-in-charge of Trade Relations S. Iswaran.

On trade matters, as long as he was a member of the Socialists & Democrats in the European Parliament, Moisa served as the EP’s Rapporteur for the Free Trade Agreement with Mexico. The negotiation with Mexico was concluded in April 2018, and it included the new Investment Court System. He was also in charge of trade relations with the Republic of Moldova, overseeing the Deep and Comprehensive Free Trade Agreement with the EU, autonomous trade preferences and macro-financial assistance from the EU. After joining the EPP, he became an EP Rapporteur for the Free Trade Agreement negotiation between the EU and Australia. In this role, he made a strong argument for Australia to stay committed to the climate agenda and fulfil its Paris climate agreement obligations.

== Romanian politics ==
According to his own statements, Moisa became a member of the Social Democratic Party (PSD) at the invitation of then PSD leader and Prime Minister, Victor Ponta, implicitly in the run-up to the 2014 European elections campaign.

After the legislative elections of December 2016, won by the PSD in a landslide, PSD leader Liviu Dragnea installed Sorin Grindeau as Prime Minister on 4 January 2017. Shortly thereafter, on the night of 31 January 2017, the Government officially adopted the infamous Emergency Ordinance 13, essentially attempting to roll back a decade of fight against corruption and bring back impunity through amendments to the criminal codes. Hundreds of thousands of people took to the streets. On 3 February, Moisa published a message whose first sentence was ‘there comes a moment when silence becomes guilty’, expressing support for the protestors’ key request that Ordinance 13 should be repelled.

Moisa eventually resigned from the PSD on 18 November 2017, after the party’s leader, Liviu Dragnea, was indicted for embezzlement of EU funds following an investigation by OLAF, the EU’s anti-fraud office. In his long message of resignation from the PSD, he also asked Dragnea to resign, accusing him of having revived ‘some of the long-groomed reflexes of national-communism’ and pulling Romania on an authoritarian path to save himself from the judiciary. He also announced his resignation from the Socialists and Democrats Group in the European Parliament, arguing that many parties in that family had in recent years ‘shifted to a radical left with which I have no affinities’, and said that he would join the centre-right European People’s Party (EPP) as an independent.

The Romanian press floated Moisa’s name as a likely Prime Minister of Romania in the run-up to the legislative elections of December 2016.

== Education ==
Sorin Moisa has a doctorate in international relations from St Antony's College, Oxford (2017).
