= Radu Țârle =

Romanian politician

Radu Ţîrle (born 17 May 1967 in Criștioru de Jos, Bihor County) is a Romanian politician. He served in the European Parliament from 2005 to 2007, first as an Observer (before Romania joined the EU) and then as a Member of the European Parliament on behalf of the Democratic Party (EPP-ED). He later served as President of the County Council of Bihor, from 2008-2012. From 2004-2008, he served in the Romanian Parliament as a Senator.
