= Daniela Buruiană =

Romanian politician

Daniela Buruiană Aprodu (born 19 July 1953) is a Romanian politician and Member of the European Parliament.

Born in Brăila, she was a member of the Greater Romania Party, part of the Identity/Sovereignty/Transparency group, and became an MEP on 1 January 2007 with the accession of Romania to the European Union.
