= 2014 European Parliament election in Romania =

- 25 May 2014

All 32 Romanian seats in the European Parliament
- Turnout: 32.44%
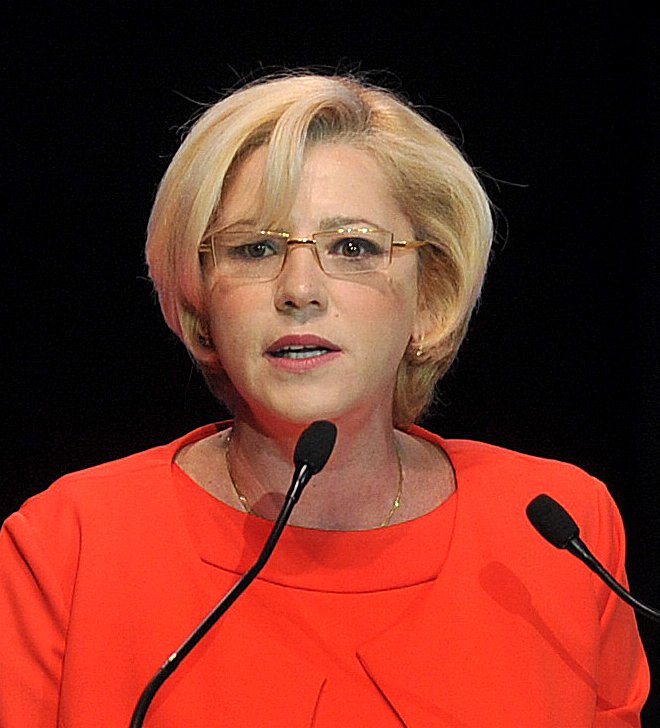

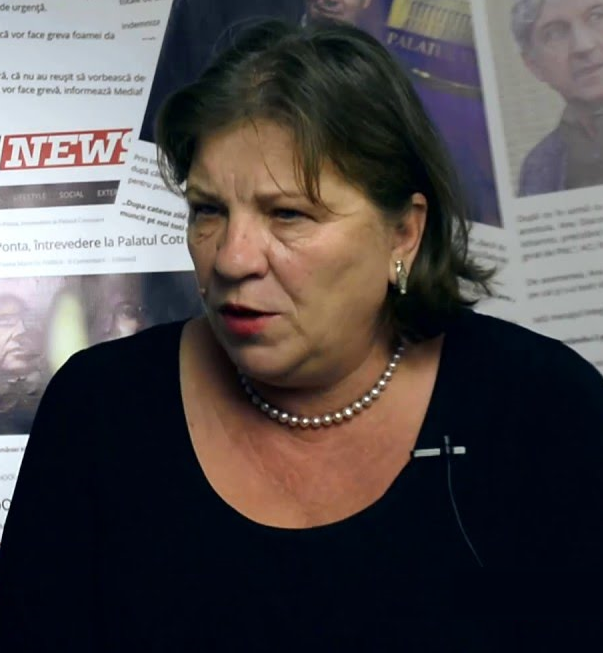

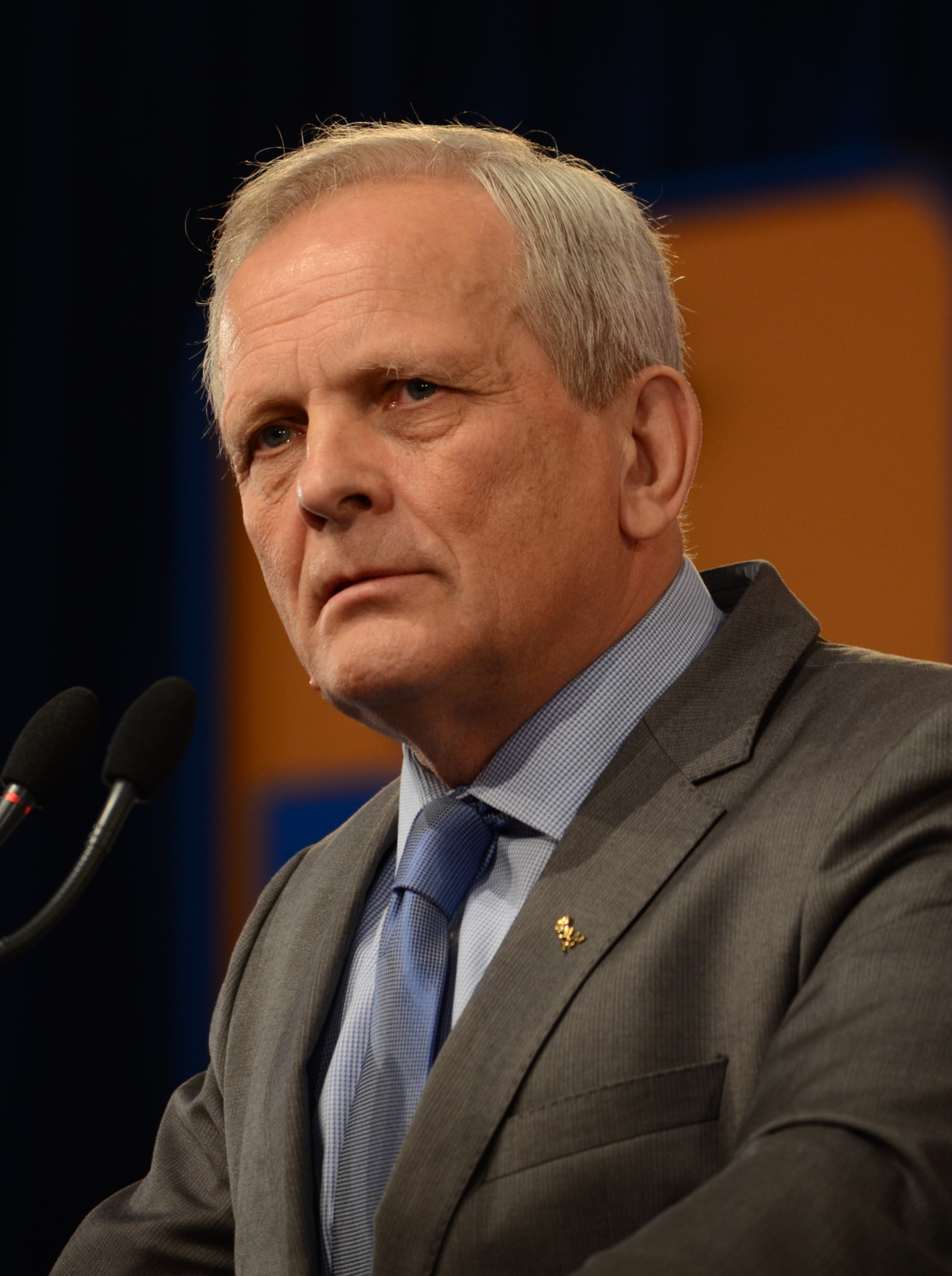

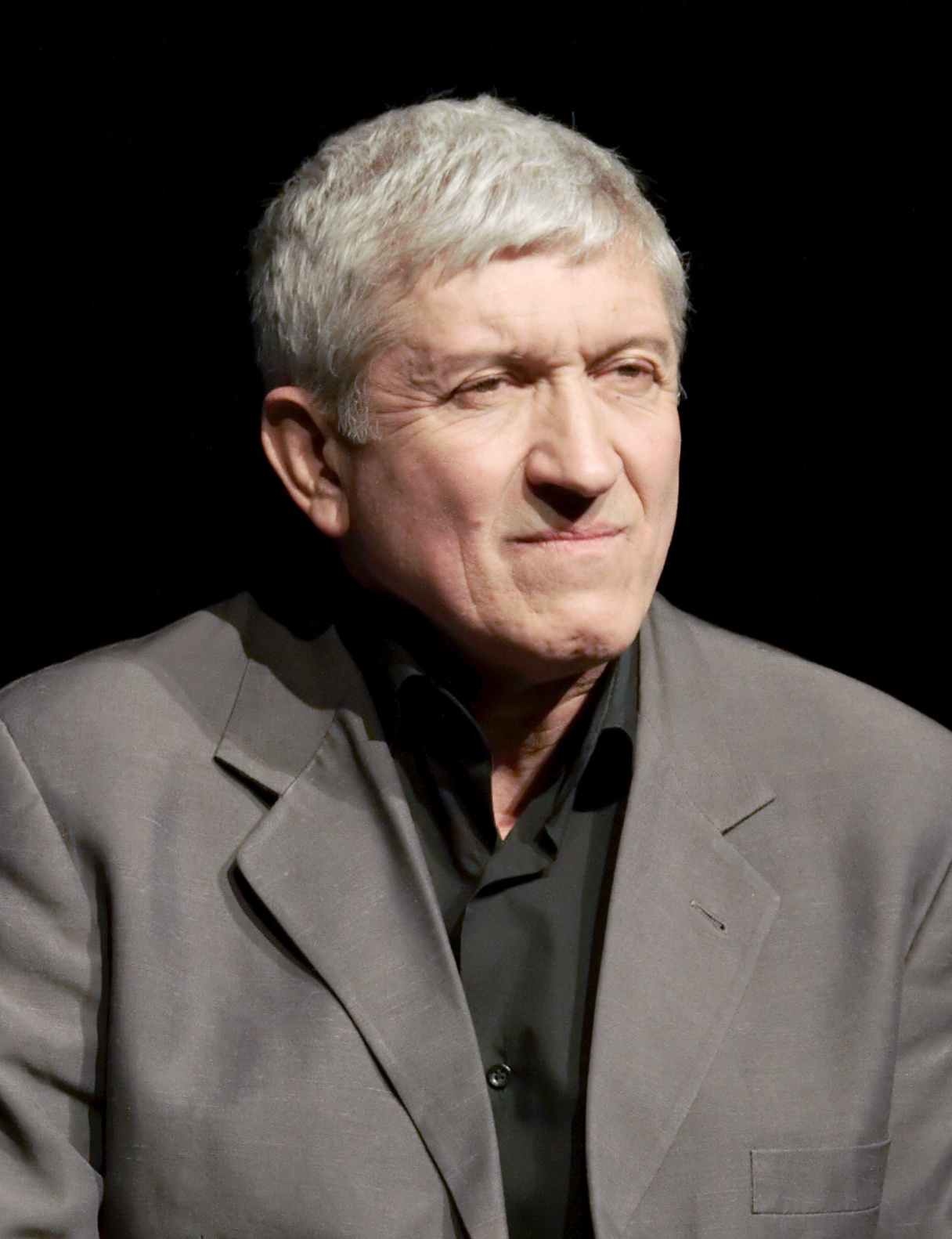

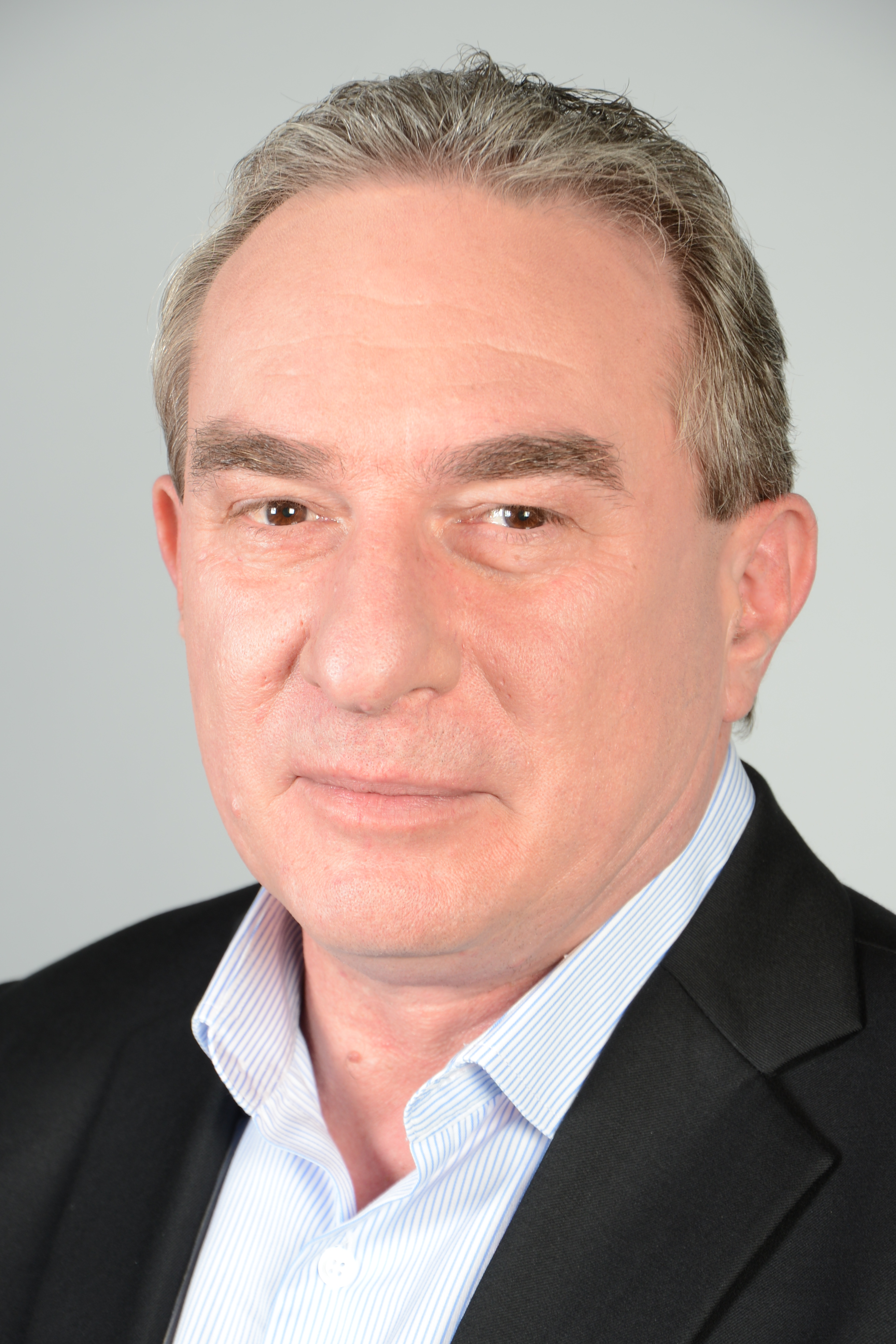

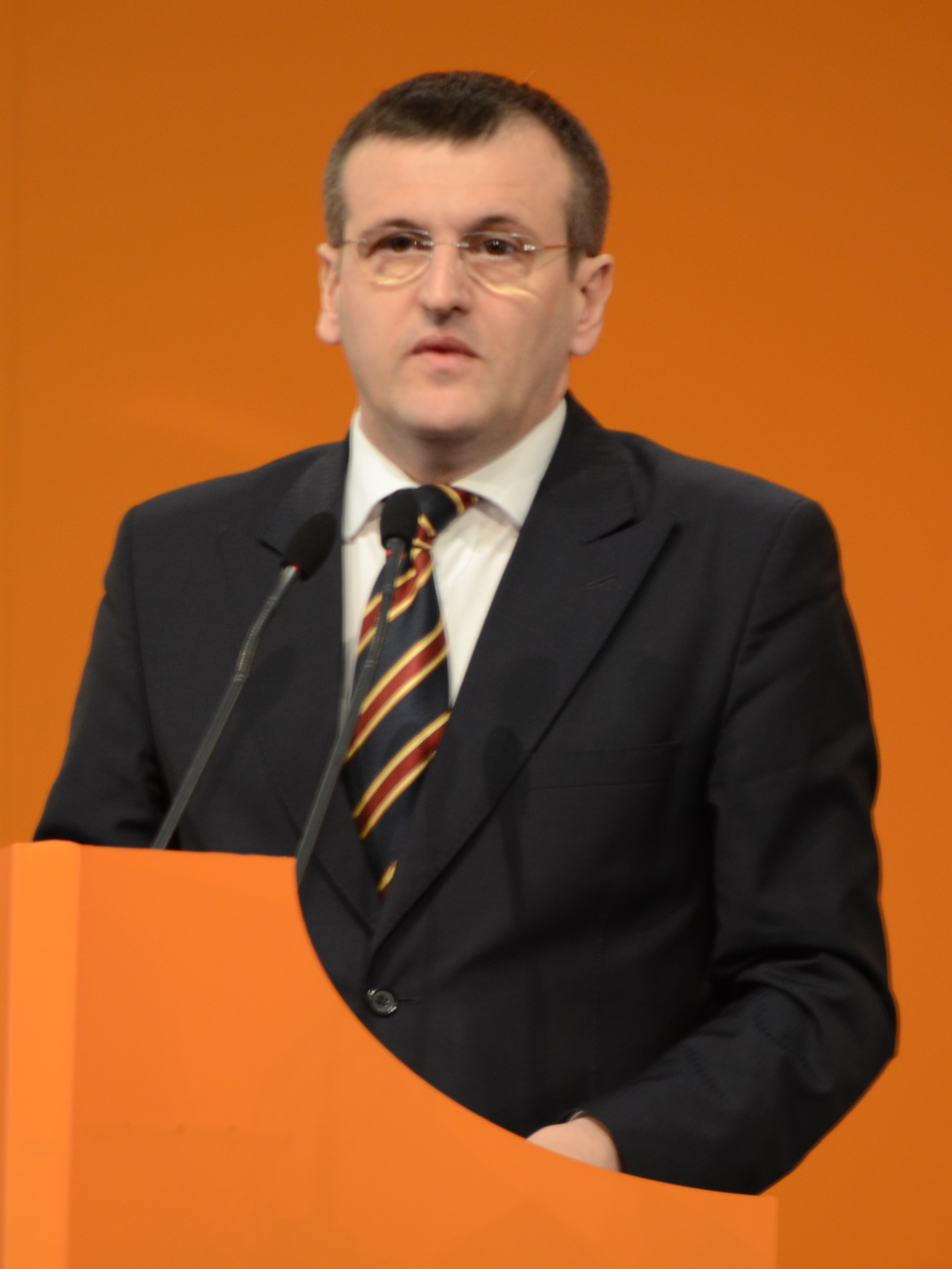
	First party	Second party	Third party
Leader	Corina Creţu	Norica Nicolai	Theodor Stolojan
Party	USD	PNL	PDL
Last election	11	5	10
Seats won	16	6	5
Seat change	▲5	▲1	▼5
Percentage	37.60%	15.01%	12.23%
EP Group	S&D	ALDE	EPP
	Fourth party	Fifth party	Sixth party
Leader	Mircea Diaconu	Iuliu Winkler	Cristian Preda
Party	Independent	UDMR	PMP
Last election	–	3	–
Seats won	1	2	2
Seat change	New	▼1	New party
Percentage	6.28%	6.30%	6.22%
EP Group	ALDE	EPP	EPP
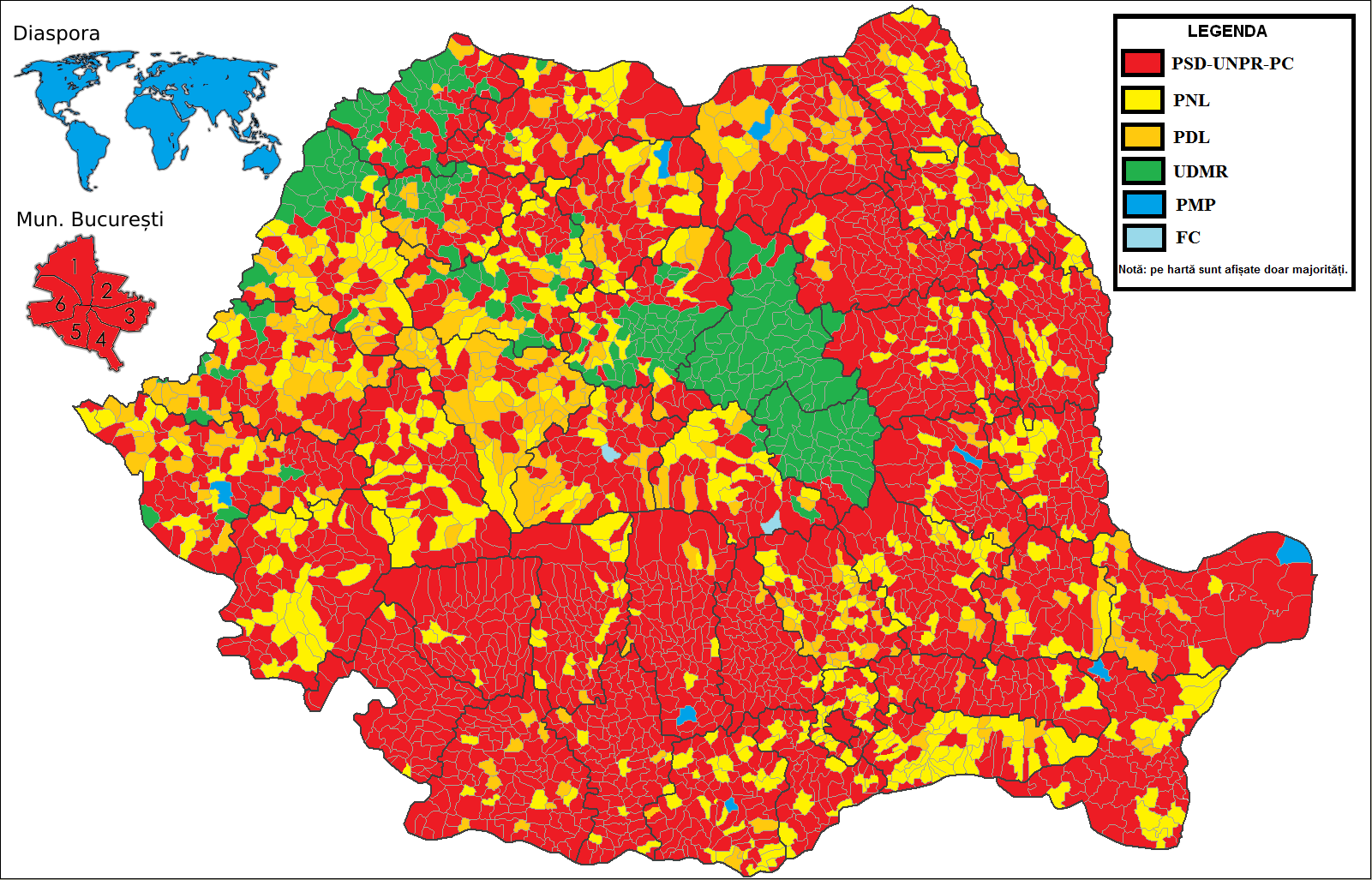

The 2014 European Parliament election in Romania was held in Romania on 25 May 2014.

== Candidates and elected MEPs ==
For the PSD–UNPR–PC Alliance:

1. Corina Crețu
2. Ecaterina Andronescu
3. Cătălin Ivan
4. Dan Nica
5. Maria Grapini – PC
6. Damian Drăghici – UNPR
7. Daciana Sârbu
8. Ioan-Mircea Pașcu
9. Vasilica Dăncilă
10. Sorin Moisă
11. Victor Boștinaru
12. Claudiu-Ciprian Tănăsescu
13. Doru-Claudian Frunzulică – UNPR
14. Constantin-Laurențiu Rebega – PC
15. Ana-Claudia Țapardel
16. Andi-Lucian Cristea

For the National Liberal Party (PNL):

1. Norica Nicolai
2. Adina Vălean
3. Ramona Mănescu
4. Cristian Bușoi
5. Renate Weber
6. Eduard Hellvig

For the Democratic Liberal Party (PDL):

1. Theodor Stolojan
2. Monica Macovei
3. Traian Ungureanu
4. Marian-Jean Marinescu
5. Daniel Buda

Independent candidate:

1. Mircea Diaconu

For the Democratic Alliance of Hungarians in Romania (UDMR):

1. Iuliu Winkler
2. Csaba Sógor

For the People's Movement Party (PMP):

1. Cristian Preda
2. Siegfried Mureșan

== Results ==
Largest party by county

Party	Votes	%	Seats	+/–
Social Democratic Union	2,093,234	37.60	16	+5
National Liberal Party	835,531	15.01	6	+1
Democratic Liberal Party	680,853	12.23	5	–5
Democratic Alliance of Hungarians in Romania	350,689	6.30	2	–1
People's Movement Party	345,973	6.22	2	New
People's Party – Dan Diaconescu	204,310	3.67	0	New
Greater Romania Party	150,484	2.70	0	–3
Civic Force	145,181	2.61	0	0
Ecologist Party of Romania	64,232	1.15	0	New
National Alliance of Farmers	53,273	0.96	0	New
Christian Democratic National Peasants' Party	49,983	0.90	0	0
Green Party	19,148	0.34	0	New
New Republic	15,419	0.28	0	New
Social Justice Party	13,537	0.24	0	New
Socialist Alternative Party	9,803	0.18	0	New
Independents	534,966	9.61	1	0
Total	5,566,616	100.00	32	–1
Valid votes	5,566,616	94.16		
Invalid/blank votes	345,011	5.84		
Total votes	5,911,627	100.00		
Registered voters/turnout	18,221,061	32.44		
Source: ROAEP

=== Results by county ===
County	PSD	PNL	PDL	Mircea Diaconu	UDMR/RMDSZ	PMP	PP-DD	PRM	FC	PER
Alba	27.54%	17.15%	27.61%	4.85%	3.39%	5.39%	2.67%	2.13%	1.88%	1.27%
Arad	26.83%	12.38%	24.74%	5.65%	7.62%	4.24%	5.45%	2.19%	2.30%	0.83%
Argeș	46.87%	10.59%	10.86%	9.99%	0.15%	6.83%	3.97%	3.65%	1.87%	0.77%
Bacău	45.85%	17.40%	7.78%	5.76%	0.38%	5.92%	4.05%	2.50%	2.90%	2.36%
Bihor	26.49%	17.71%	13.43%	4.61%	21.58%	3.03%	1.99%	1.93%	1.97%	0.61%
Bistrița-Năsăud	39.67%	16.97%	18.86%	3.02%	4.70%	4.58%	2.40%	1.85%	2.18%	0.92%
Botoșani	41.58%	20.25%	11.18%	6.51%	0.17%	3.39%	3.83%	3.12%	3.31%	1.26%
Brașov	30.44%	14.05%	15.62%	9.80%	6.89%	5.24%	2.08%	2.47%	4.31%	2.52%
Brăila	42.29%	11.04%	12.43%	8.24%	0.18%	5.38%	6.48%	3.57%	2.25%	0.95%
București	31.81%	10.04%	9.80%	16.00%	0.25%	11.35%	2.41%	3.29%	4.77%	1.52%
Buzău	41.52%	22.40%	8.19%	6.81%	0.13%	5.77%	4.37%	3.79%	1.22%	0.92%
Caraș-Severin	39.62%	22.34%	10.29%	5.20%	0.92%	3.93%	4.92%	2.47%	1.69%	0.78%
Călărași	32.55%	34.93%	11.70%	4.66%	0.08%	3.83%	4.35%	2.07%	1.13%	0.57%
Cluj	24.96%	13.76%	16.14%	6.29%	16.44%	6.54%	2.40%	1.87%	2.95%	1.24%
Constanța	34.48%	14.75%	10.49%	9.54%	0.19%	11.18%	4.25%	3.29%	4.10%	1.37%
Covasna	7.81%	2.99%	3.10%	2.18%	76.11%	1.41%	0.95%	1.46%	0.83%	0.47%
Dâmbovița	50.31%	10.15%	14.15%	5.29%	0.09%	5.15%	4.30%	3.58%	2.17%	0.76%
Dolj	55.99%	9.39%	14.93%	5.09%	0.10%	4.67%	3.17%	2.02%	1.26%	0.46%
Galați	46.51%	16.99%	7.77%	6.78%	0.21%	6.19%	4.72%	2.31%	2.12%	1.17%
Giurgiu	55.17%	18.58%	5.76%	4.22%	0.09%	6.98%	2.91%	2.24%	0.62%	0.56%
Gorj	43.89%	13.74%	11.84%	5.40%	0.42%	5.23%	8.20%	5.11%	1.90%	0.65%
Harghita	3.84%	1.36%	1.50%	0.90%	87.22%	1.12%	0.67%	0.94%	0.43%	0.32%
Hunedoara	37.00%	21.59%	7.43%	7.60%	3.85%	4.99%	3.81%	3.62%	2.65%	0.93%
Ialomița	47.25%	13.75%	11.17%	6.42%	0.11%	5.39%	4.50%	3.65%	1.40%	0.72%
Iași	37.57%	16.94%	8.91%	7.15%	0.13%	5.72%	4.19%	2.62%	9.08%	1.22%
Ilfov	36.31%	29.47%	8.63%	5.83%	0.09%	6.56%	2.48%	2.27%	2.18%	0.80%
Maramureș	34.86%	16.98%	12.03%	5.79%	6.21%	7.59%	3.82%	2.87%	1.52%	1.80%
Mehedinți	51.02%	15.11%	9.40%	4.47%	0.33%	5.59%	5.25%	2.37%	0.81%	0.40%
Mureș	20.74%	11.40%	8.14%	4.35%	40.26%	3.27%	2.09%	3.17%	1.81%	0.71%
Neamț	43.16%	10.62%	9.29%	7.46%	0.15%	9.32%	3.86%	3.05%	2.92%	2.94%
Olt	58.51%	15.67%	7.03%	3.18%	0.07%	4.75%	4.50%	2.83%	0.60%	0.28%
Prahova	33.06%	16.78%	17.17%	7.75%	0.12%	7.29%	4.19%	3.22%	2.62%	1.13%
Satu Mare	28.47%	6.32%	9.66%	2.37%	35.54%	3.64%	5.36%	0.97%	2.79%	2.00%
Sălaj	26.38%	10.89%	15.76%	3.79%	27.43%	3.90%	2.85%	1.32%	1.56%	0.60%
Sibiu	31.20%	17.92%	16.80%	6.95%	2.11%	6.36%	3.67%	1.73%	3.81%	2.90%
Suceava	40.13%	9.77%	23.07%	6.33%	0.34%	4.48%	3.03%	2.95%	1.66%	1.10%
Teleorman	47.97%	22.85%	12.21%	3.55%	0.07%	3.93%	3.36%	2.06%	0.71%	0.37%
Timiș	32.57%	14.53%	15.85%	7.83%	3.85%	7.98%	3.64%	2.04%	2.78%	1.40%
Tulcea	34.72%	15.35%	16.36%	5.87%	0.13%	7.68%	6.04%	3.42%	2.64%	0.83%
Vaslui	44.63%	14.86%	11.52%	5.94%	0.75%	6.05%	4.03%	3.03%	1.79%	1.55%
Vâlcea	40.91%	20.56%	12.79%	6.03%	0.38%	5.57%	3.27%	3.42%	2.06%	0.58%
Vrancea	46.1%	15.94%	10.25%	5.40%	0.09%	7.14%	4.90%	2.45%	2.41%	0.84%
Diaspora	11.05%	8.69%	15.72%	6.38%	1.23%	28.64%	5.49%	2.21%	6.47%	3.86%
