= Sándor Kónya-Hamar =

Romanian politician (born 1948)

Sándor Kónya-Hamar (born September 5, 1948, in Lunca Mureșului, Alba County) is an ethnic Hungarian politician in Romania and Member of the European Parliament. He is a member of the Democratic Union of Hungarians in Romania, part of the European People's Party–European Democrats, and became an MEP on 1 January 2007 with the accession of Romania to the European Union.

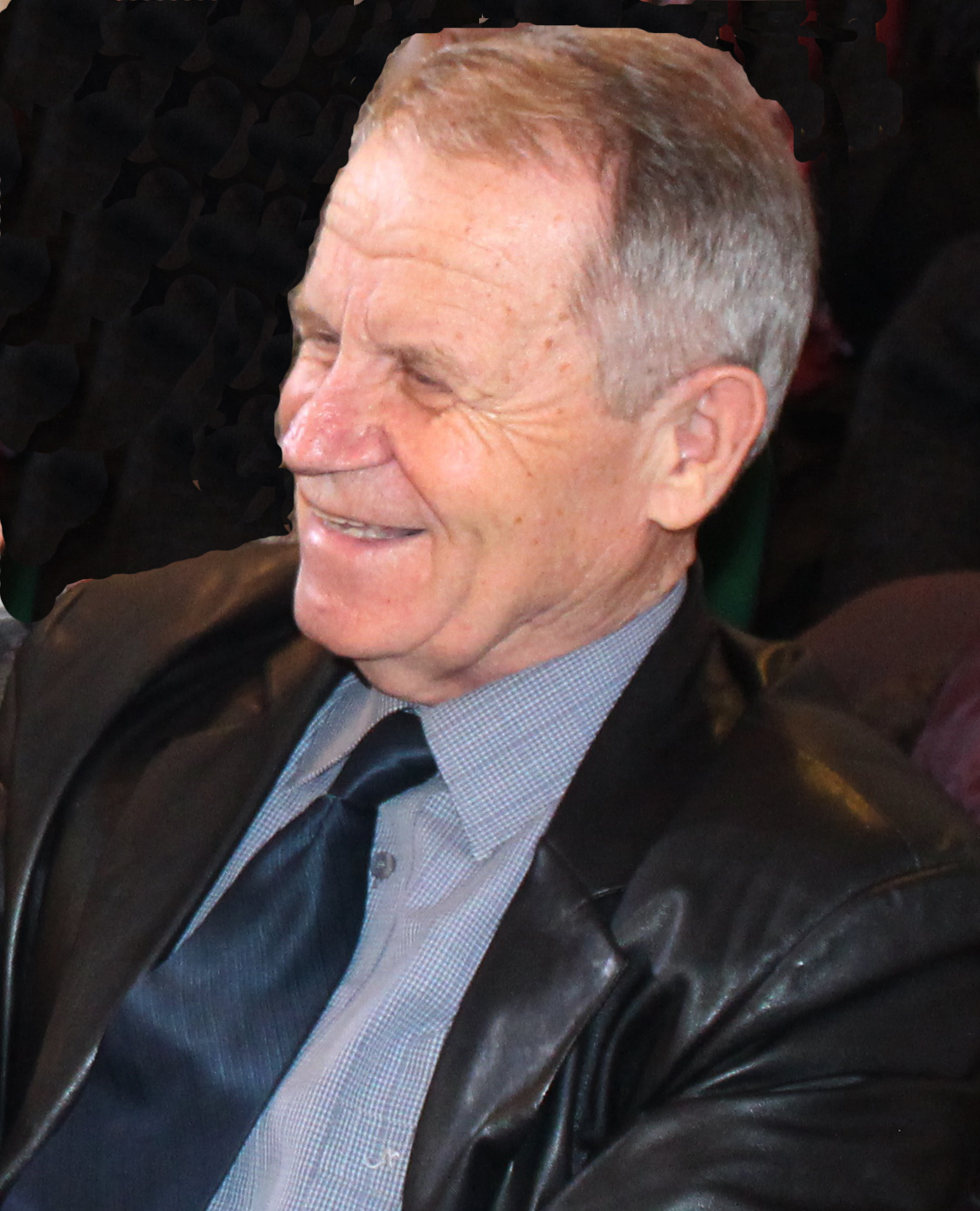
Image: László Horváth
