= Siegfried Mureșan =

Romanian economist and politician (born 1981)

Siegfried Mureșan MEP
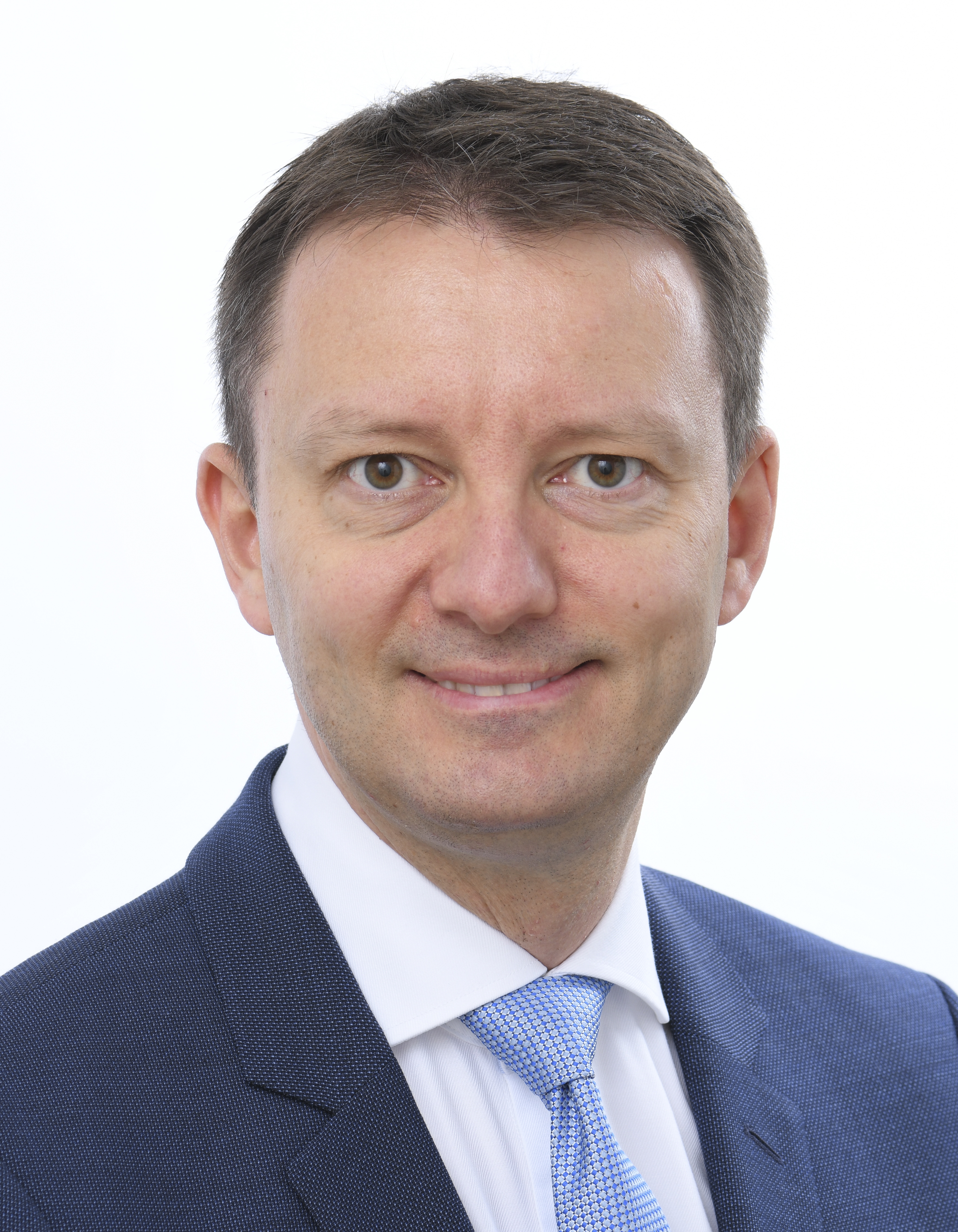
- Official portrait, 2024

Member of the European Parliament for Romania
- Incumbent
- Assumed office 1 July 2014

Vice-President of European Peoples Party
- Incumbent
- Assumed office 12 November 2019

Personal details
- Born: 20 September 1981 (age 45) Hunedoara, Hunedoara County, Socialist Republic of Romania
- Party: National Liberal Party (2018–present); European People's Party (2014–present)
- Other political affiliations: People's Movement Party (2014–2018)
- Education: Bucharest Academy of Economic Studies (ASE); Humboldt University of Berlin (HU Berlin)
- Website: siegfriedmuresan.eu

Siegfried Vasile Mureșan (born 20 September 1981) is a Romanian economist and politician, vice-president of the European People's Party (EPP) since November 2019, vice-president of the European People's Party Group (EPP Group) in the European Parliament and member of the National Liberal Party (PNL). He was elected as Member of the European Parliament (MEP) from Romania in 2014 and 2019. He was previously affiliated with the Democratic Liberal Party (PDL) before joining the People's Movement Party (PMP), where he served from 2014 to 2018. He was set to become Prime Minister of Romania in 2026 but failed to win the confidence vote of Parliament.

== Early life and education ==
Siegfried Mureșan was born on 20 September 1981 in Hunedoara, Romania, to a Romanian Orthodox father and an ethnic German Catholic mother from the Transylvanian Saxon community. He was raised in a bilingual environment, speaking both Romanian and German.

He graduated in economics from the Bucharest Academy of Economic Studies in 2004. He then received an International Parliamentary Scholarship from the German Parliament, and went on to earn a master's degree in economics and management from the Humboldt University of Berlin in 2006.

== Early career ==
Mureșan began his professional career serving for three years as an advisor to Gunther Krichbaum, the Chair of the Committee on European Affairs in the German Parliament. He subsequently worked briefly in the European Parliament.

In 2011, he joined the headquarters of the European People's Party (EPP) as a political advisor for economics and social policy. He was promoted to senior political advisor in January 2014 and, in January 2015, was appointed as the political spokesperson of the EPP.

== Political career ==
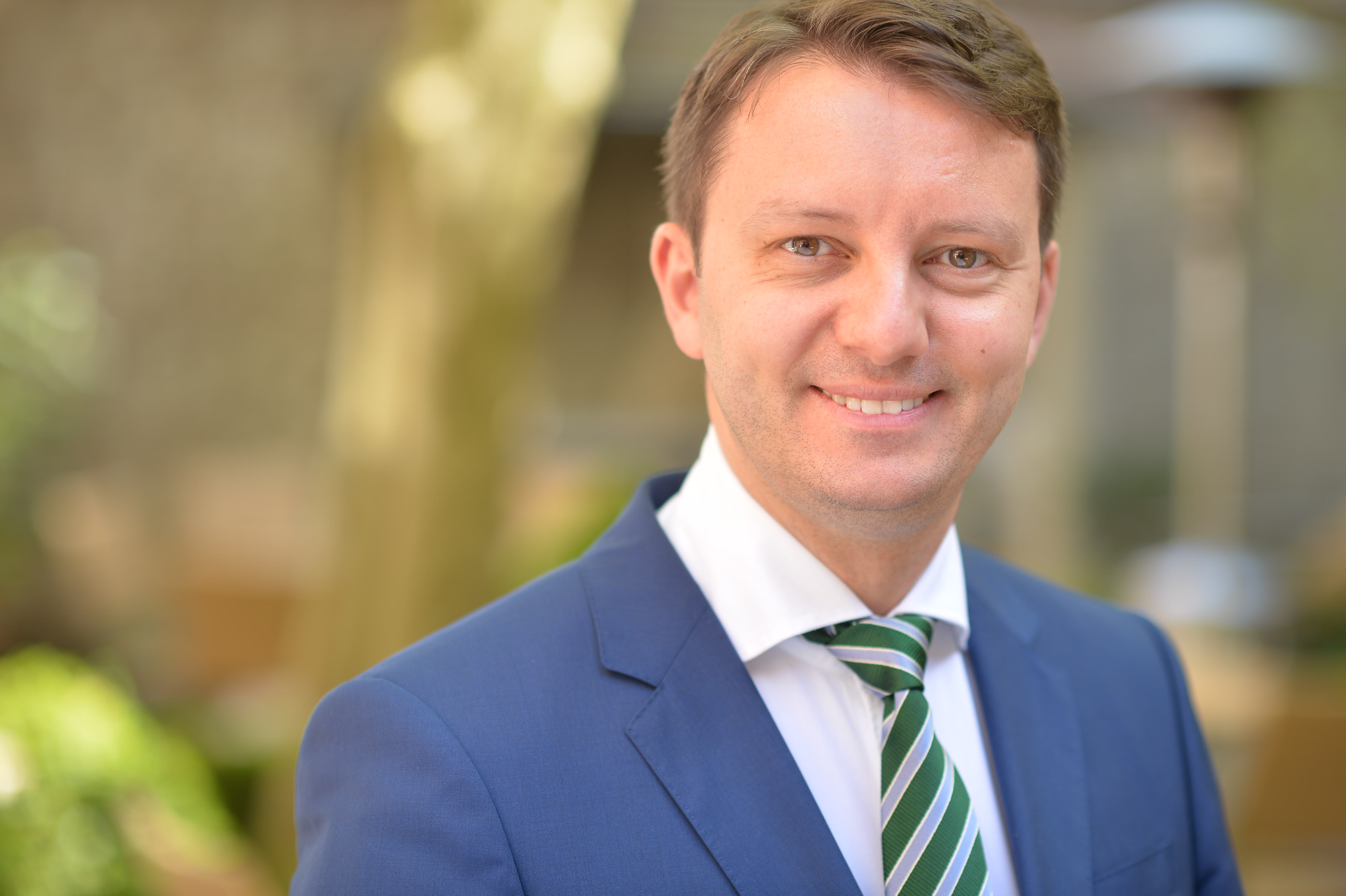
Romanian MEP Siegfried Mureșan in 2016

=== First term as Member of the European Parliament ===
In March 2014, Mureșan joined the People's Movement Party (PMP), and took part in the European Parliament elections which were held on 25 May 2014. He was the second candidate on the list and was elected for a five-year term in the European Parliament. Later on, Mureșan was elected as vice-president of the Committee on Budgets, substitute member of the Committee on Economic and Monetary Affairs and member of the Delegation to the EU - Moldova Parliamentary Association Committee.

In July 2014, Mureșan was appointed interim President of the PMP's youth organization. On 22 January 2015, the President of the European People's Party (EPP), Joseph Daul, announced Mureșan as the newly appointed spokesperson of the EPP. On 7 May 2018 he joined the National Liberal Party (PNL), the largest member party of the EPP in Romania.

==== Rapporteur on redundancies from Câmpia Turzii ====
The European Parliament approved Mureșan's report on redundancies from Câmpia Turzii in September 2014, allocating EUR 3.57 million in European Globalisation Adjustment Fund that were needed in order to offer support to redundant workers from Mechel Steel Plant from Câmpia Turzii.

==== Support for Romania following 2014 floods ====
In July 2015, the Parliament approved financial aid worth EUR 66.5 million in order to compensate the damage caused by the floods of 2014 in Romania, Italy and Bulgaria in response to a report coordinated by Mureșan.

==== EPP Group Negotiator for the 2017 EU Budget ====
In 2016, Mureșan was appointed as main negotiator of the EPP Group for the 2017 EU Budget.

==== European Parliament Rapporteur for the 2018 EU Budget ====
On 24 November 2016, the Committee on Budgets designated Mureșan as the European Parliament's rapporteur for the EU Budget 2018, the first Romanian to take on this role.

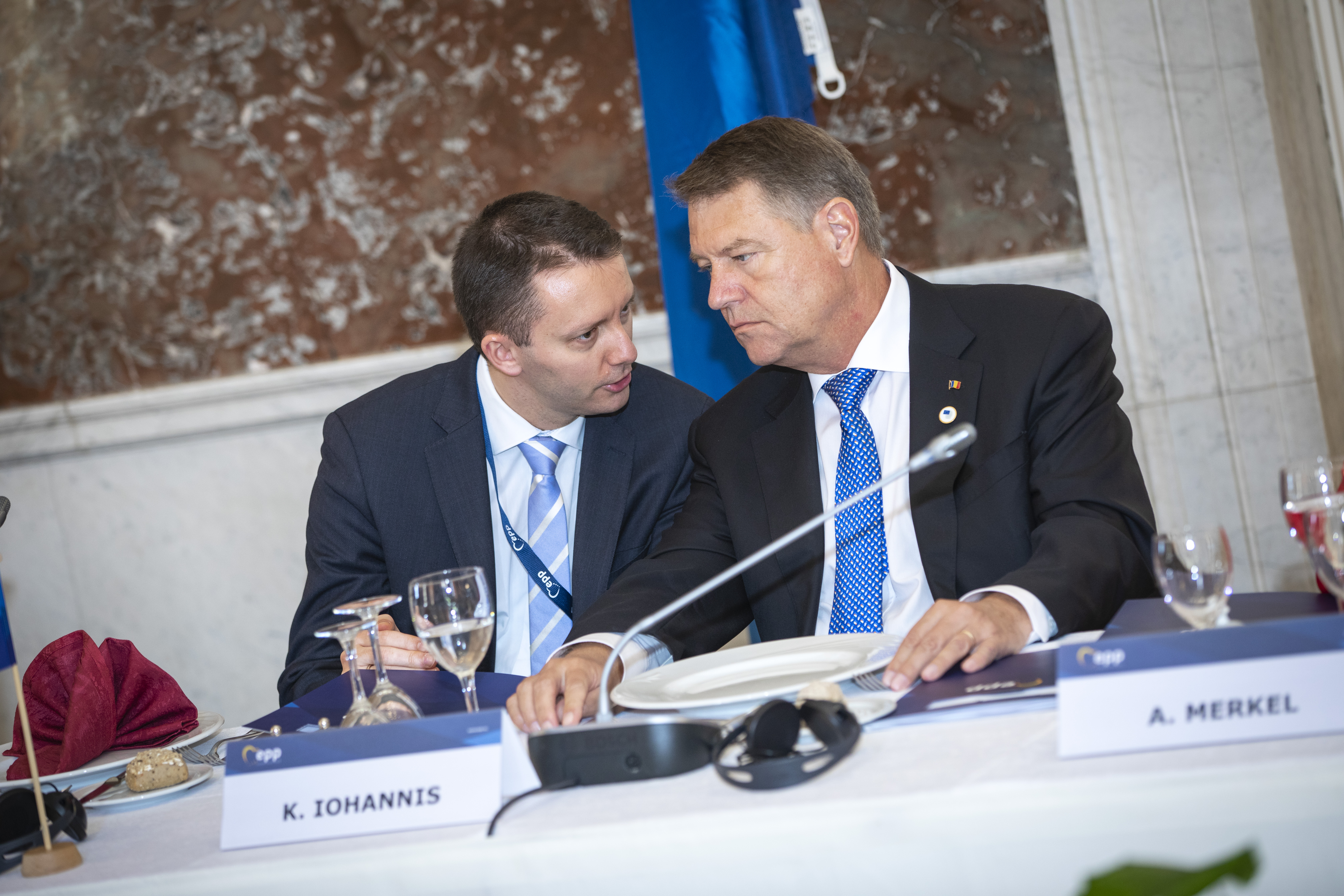
Mureșan with former Romanian president Klaus Iohannis in 2019 at the European People's Party (EPP) Summit in Brussels, Belgium.

As Chief Negotiator of the European Parliament for the EU Budget 2018, one of Mureșan's main priorities for the negotiations was the increase of the budget allocations for the Eastern Neighbourhood countries, including the Republic of Moldova.

==== Representing the European Parliament ====
Mureșan participated as a European Parliament representative at the 2016 World Bank-IMF annual meeting in Washington DC. He participated as an international observer in the Election Observation Mission of the European Parliament during the two rounds of the 2016 presidential election in Moldova.

==== EPP Group Rapporteur on the activity of the European Investment Bank and the European Central Bank ====
During his first mandate as a member of the European Parliament, Mureșan was also EPP Group rapporteur on the 2016 annual report on the financial activities of the European Investment Bank and EPP Group rapporteur on the report on the 2016 annual report of the European Central Bank.

==== Positions in the European Parliament on the rule of law in Romania ====
Mureșan criticised the measures taken by the Romanian Government and Romanian Parliament in 2017 and 2018 to amend judicial legislation. He took part in protests against the Romanian Government organised between January 2017 and February 2018 in Bucharest.

On 7 February 2018, during the debate of the European Parliament on "Threats to the Rule of Law Caused by the Judicial Reform in Romania" Mureșan emphasized his support for the protesters, saying "the reality in Romania is as follows: there is a major discrepancy between what people want and what the ruling coalition wants. People want justice and rule of law. They want European values, while the politicians from the Government want to weaken state institutions and put justice under their control."

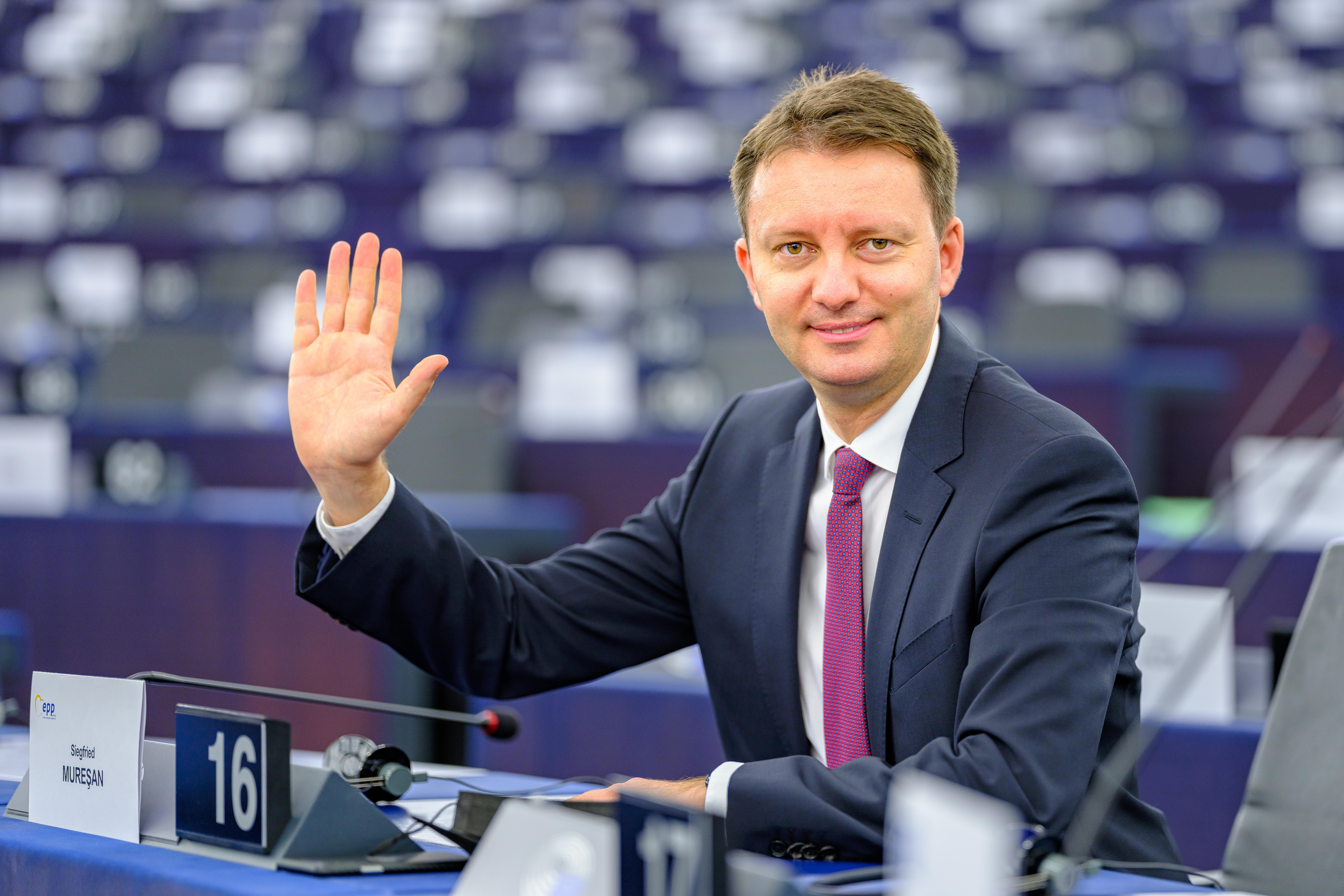
Siegfried Mureșan in the European Parliament in 2021

=== Second term as Member of the European Parliament ===
On 24 September 2018, Mureșan submitted to the National Liberal Party (PNL) his application file as candidate for a new mandate in the European Parliament. In his application file, he defined as his most important objectives for the upcoming parliamentary term the protection of Romania's interests throughout his activity in the Committee on Budgets of the European Parliament and the securing of the highest level of financial allocations for Romania. At the same time, he emphasized his commitment to obtain sufficient financial allocations from the EU Budget for "Erasmus" scholarships and researchers, as well as for farmers and cohesion policy.

Mureșan also outlined his plans to actively take part in the debates on the future of the Eurozone, so that the decisions adopted at EU level would not affect in a negative way the economy of Romania. Moreover, he clearly committed to protecting the rights and interests of the non-euro area Member States that have expressed their will to join the euro.

On 14 March 2019, the enlarged presidency of the National Liberal Party (PNL) approved the list of candidates for the European Parliament elections taking place on 26 May 2019. Mureşan was placed on the third position on the National Liberal Party candidates' list.

On 27 March 2019, the National Liberal Party officially submitted to the Central Electoral Bureau the list of candidates and the necessary support signatures for the European Parliament elections, taking place on 26 May 2019. Mureșan thus became an official candidate for a new mandate in the European Parliament. The National Liberal Party won the elections of 26 May 2019 by obtaining 27% of the votes cast and Mureșan was elected for a new term in the European Parliament.

==== Vice-Chair of the EPP Group in the European Parliament ====
Shortly after the elections, on 5 June 2019, Mureșan became Vice-Chair of the EPP Group in the European Parliament (the largest political group of the European Parliament). He was elected by 141 out of 158 votes cast. On 19 September 2019, the EPP Group in the European Parliament decided that Siegfried Mureșan, in his capacity as Vice-Chair of the EPP Group, will coordinate the Group's activity in the areas relating to the EU budget, regional development, agriculture and budgetary control. He was re-elected as Vice-Chair of the EPP Group in October 2021, with the highest number of votes among the 10 Vice-Chairs elected.

==== Vice-President of the European People's Party ====
On 12 November 2019 Mureșan was elected as Vice-President of the European People's Party (EPP). One of the main priorities during his mandate will be to advocate for EPP to be the European party that contributes decisively to strengthening Romania's position as part of the European Union.

On 1 June 2022, he was re-elected as Vice-President during the EPP Congress in Rotterdam.

==== Rapporteur on the financing of the European Green Deal ====
In January 2020, Mureșan was appointed as the European Parliament's rapporteur on the financing of the European Green Deal. The report on the Sustainable Europe Investment Plan (the Green Deal), coordinated by Mureşan, was adopted in October 2020 in a joint session of the European Parliament's Budgets and Economic and Monetary Affairs Committees. In the Report, the European Parliament requests an adequate financing of the Green Deal to help reduce the gaps between Eastern and Western European countries in the transition to an emission-neutral economy.

Since 2021, he has been part of the Parliament's delegation to the Conference on the Future of Europe.

==== Co-Rapporteur for the European Recovery and Resilience Facility (RRF) ====
In July 2020, Mureșan was elected co-rapporteur of the European Parliament for the European Recovery and Resilience Facility (RRF), a tool designed to help EU member states finance their national economic recovery plans in the context of the COVID-19 pandemic. In February 2021, following a report coordinated by Mureșan as co-rapporteur, the European Parliament adopted the RRF legislation. According to the report, Member States would receive EUR 672.5 billion to finance their recovery plans. The investments and reforms financed by RRF must be started by 31 December 2023. Romania would benefit from approximately EUR 30 billion from the Facility.

In December 2021, Mureșan was also appointed co-rapporteur of the European Parliament for the report on the implementation of the European Recovery and Resilience Facility.

The first Report on the implementation of the European Recovery and Resilience Facility was adopted in the European Parliament Plenary on 23 June 2022. The Report recommends the use of unspent funds from the Recovery and Resilience Facility, about EUR 200 billion, for investments in cross-border energy projects.

==== Rapporteur on the adoption by Croatia of the euro on 1 January 2023 ====
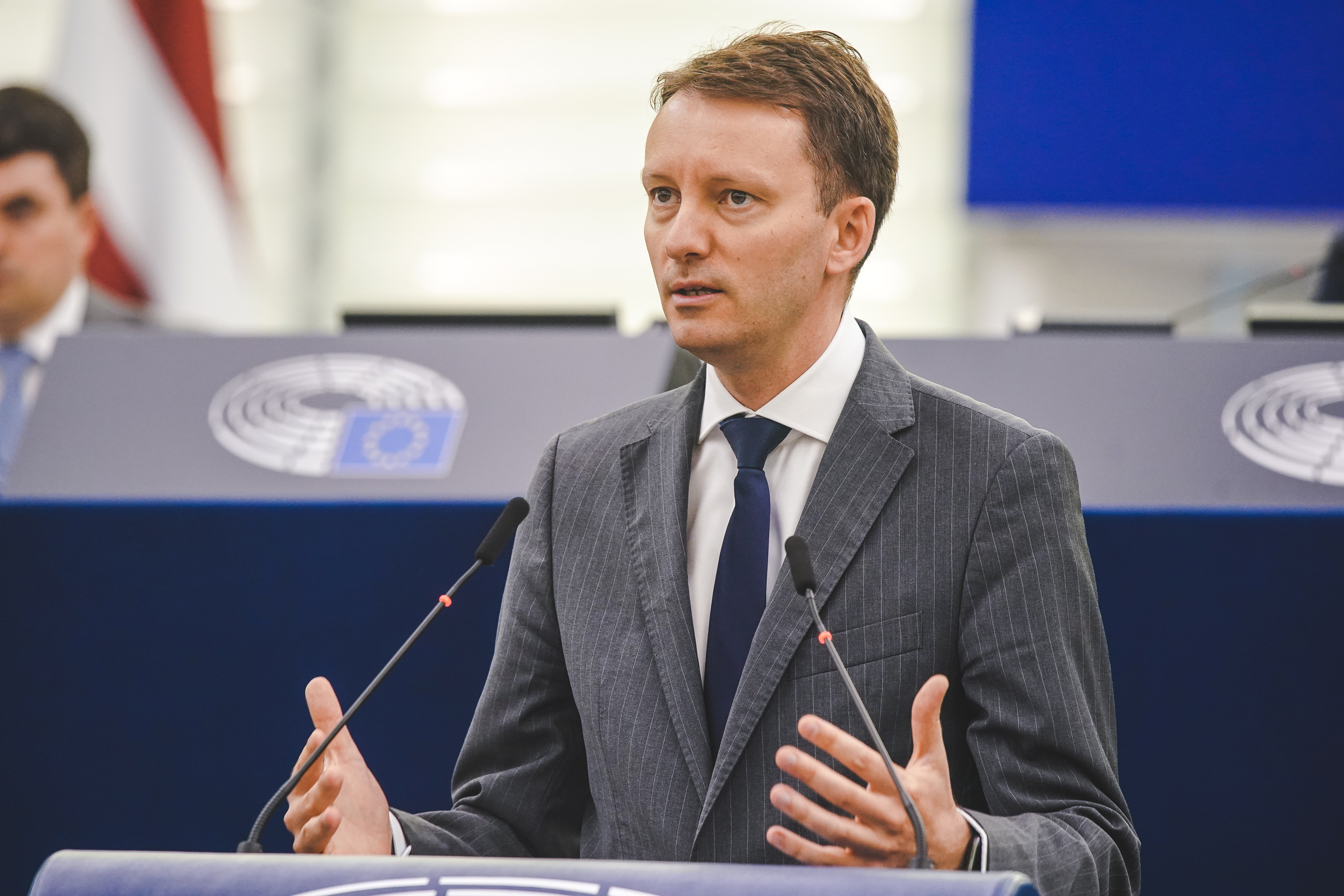
Mureșan in the European Parliament in June 2022

Mureșan was the rapporteur on the opinion of the European Parliament for the accession of Croatia to the Euro area. Mureșan's report, which supports Croatia's accession to the Eurozone, was adopted by the European Parliament's plenary in July 2022.

==== EU - Republic of Moldova relations ====
In addition to his committee work, Mureșan has been chairing the European Parliament's delegation to the EU-Moldova Parliamentary Association Committee since 26 September 2019.

=== Third Term in the European Parliament ===
On 9 June, Mureșan was re-elected for a new 5-year term in the European Parliament, on behalf of the National Liberal Party (PNL).

==== Vice-Chair of the EPP Group in the European Parliament ====
At the beginning of this new term, Mureșan was re-elected as Vice-Chair of the EPP Group in the European Parliament, receiving 151 out of 170 valid votes cast.

==== Vice-President of the European People's Party ====
Mureșan was re-elected as Vice-President of the European People's Party (EPP) with a large majority—over 70% of the valid votes—during the Congress held in Valencia in April 2025.

The EPP Congress in Valencia gathered over 1,700 delegates, guests, and journalists from the European Union and neighboring countries, including delegations from the National Liberal Party. Among the European leaders attending the Congress were the President of the European Commission, Ursula von der Leyen; the President of the European Parliament, Roberta Metsola; the designated Chancellor of Germany, Friedrich Merz; the Prime Minister of Greece, Kyriakos Mitsotakis; the Prime Minister of Croatia, Andrej Plenković; the Prime Minister of Sweden, Ulf Kristersson; the Prime Minister of Finland, Petteri Orpo; the President of the Republic of Moldova, Maia Sandu; and the Deputy Prime Minister of Italy, Antonio Tajani.

As Vice-President of the European People’s Party, his responsibilities include negotiations on behalf of the EPP on the EU’s long-term budget, the implementation of the European Recovery and Resilience Facility (which funds the National Recovery and Resilience Plans—NRRPs—of Member States), coordinating the EPP finance ministers' meetings ahead of ECOFIN Council sessions, managing relations with the Republic of Moldova, and liaising with the European Committee of the Regions.

==== Coordination of the EU’s Long-Term Budget ====
Mureșan is leading negotiations on the future Multiannual Financial Framework (MFF) of the European Union, which will be implemented after 2027. The EU’s seven-year budget, worth approximately €1.3 trillion, is the main instrument through which Romania receives the largest share of its non-reimbursable European investment and agricultural subsidy funds.

Mureșan is the first Romanian MEP to hold this role.

The report on the European Parliament’s priorities for the next Multiannual Financial Framework 2028–2034, coordinated by MEP Siegfried Mureșan (EPP/PNL) as chief negotiator of the Parliament, was adopted in plenary on 7 May 2025. The report calls for an appropriate increase of the EU budget for 2028–2034, taking into account new priorities such as defence and strengthening the economy, without negatively impacting traditional areas like agriculture and cohesion.

==== Support for the Republic of Moldova ====
Mureșan was re-elected on 3 October 2024 for a new five-year term as Chair of the European Parliament’s Delegation for relations with the Republic of Moldova. In this role, he co-chairs the EU-Moldova Parliamentary Association Committee, which brings together Members of the European Parliament and the Parliament of the Republic of Moldova. His main objective is to support the Republic of Moldova in preparing for EU accession, including through alignment of national legislation with the EU acquis.

Mureșan was also appointed co-rapporteur for the European Growth Plan for the Republic of Moldova, a €1.9 billion financial package aimed at modernizing infrastructure and improving living standards in the country.

In March 2025, the European Parliament approved the Moldova Growth and Reform Facility, worth €1.9 billion, with a broad majority: 499 votes in favour, 117 against, and 44 abstentions.

==== Co-Rapporteur for the Implementation of the Recovery and Resilience Facility (RRF) ====
Mureșan was appointed co-rapporteur of the European Parliament for the report on the implementation of the Recovery and Resilience Facility by the Committee on Economic and Monetary Affairs. In this role, he assesses the efficiency of the implementation by the European Commission and Member States and proposes measures to ensure that the funds are directed toward investments and reforms that improve long-term quality of life.

The report on the implementation of the RRF, which funds Romania’s National Recovery and Resilience Plan (NRRP), coordinated by MEP Siegfried Mureșan as co-rapporteur, was adopted in the European Parliament’s plenary session in June, thereby becoming the official position of the European Parliament.

The report calls on the European Commission to propose an 18-month extension for mature NRRP projects. Simultaneously, it urges Member States to prioritize mature projects during implementation and avoid risking the loss of funds by starting reforms or investments that are unlikely to be completed. It also calls for greater involvement of local and regional authorities in NRRP implementation. If there are unused funds left in the RRF, the report asks the European Commission to find a solution to redirect these funds towards EU priorities such as economic strengthening, defence, and cohesion.

== Personal life ==
In 2016, Mureșan married Cătălina Manea, an anti-fraud expert who has worked at the European Investment Bank in Luxembourg since 2019.

Outside of politics, Mureșan is a tennis enthusiast and a fan of Spanish player Rafael Nadal.

== Awards and distinctions ==
Mureșan was awarded the Order of Honour of the Republic of Moldova by President Maia Sandu in December 2021, "as a sign of appreciation for supporting the goal of European integration and efforts to strengthen democratic processes in the Republic of Moldova".

== Publications ==
- It's Our Job Reforming Europe's Labour Markets (4 May 2015) together with Eoin Drea.
