= Norica Nicolai =

Romanian lawyer and politician

Norica Nicolai MEP
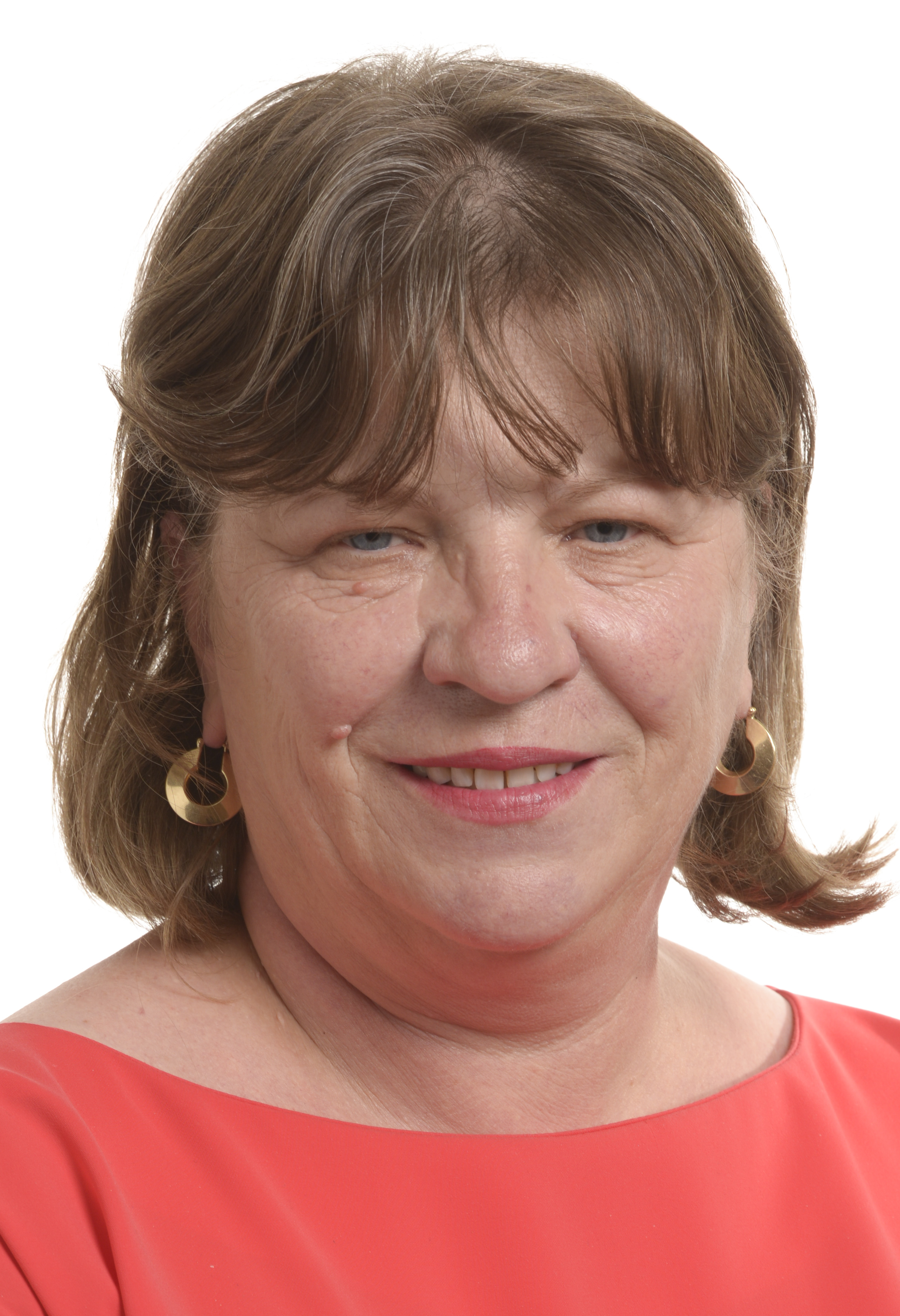

Member of the European Parliament for Romania
- In office 1 July 2009 – 1 July 2019

Senator
- In office November 2000 – November 2008 Serving with four others
- President: Ion Iliescu; Traian Băsescu
- Prime Minister: Adrian Năstase; Eugen Bejinariu; Călin Popescu-Tăriceanu
- Constituency: No. 13 Cluj

Personal details
- Born: Norica Clinci; 27 January 1958 (age 68) Sinaia, Romania
- Party: Christian Democratic National Peasants' Party (PNȚ-CD); National Liberal Party (PNL); Independent; Alliance of Liberals and Democrats (ALDE)
- Education: University of Bucharest
- Profession: Lawyer
- Website: www.noricanicolai.ro

Norica Nicolai (born January 27, 1958) is a Romanian lawyer and politician. An independent who previously belonged to the National Liberal Party (PNL) and before that the Christian Democratic National Peasants' Party (PNŢ-CD), she was a member of the Romanian Senate for Cluj County from 2000 to 2008, and a Member of the European Parliament between 2009 and 2019. She was at the centre of a conflict between Prime Minister Călin Popescu-Tăriceanu and President Traian Băsescu in early 2008, with the latter rejecting, ultimately successfully, the former's nomination of Nicolai to be Justice Minister.

She is married and has one child.

== Biography ==
=== Early career ===
She was born in Sinaia, and, following secondary studies at the town's George Enescu High School, in 1983 she graduated from the Law Faculty of the University of Bucharest. From 1983 to 1991, she was a prosecutor at the Olteniţa courthouse, and from 1991 to 1993 was legal adviser to a rural trucking company in Călăraşi. She worked as a lawyer in the same city from 1991 to 1997. From 1998 to 2001, Nicolai was president of the Economic and Social Council, a public institution that facilitates dialogue between employers, unions and the government; and was a secretary of state at the Labour Ministry from 1997 to 2000. She belonged to the Christian Democratic National Peasants' Party (PNŢ-CD) from 1997 until August 2000, when it expelled her for signing a declaration in support of then-PNL member Theodor Stolojan; the PNŢ-CD supported Mugur Isărescu in the upcoming presidential election.

In autumn 2000, by then a PNL member, she was elected to the Senate, being re-elected in 2004. In 2006, she was the subject of controversy when cameras caught her niece in her Senate chair with a voting card in her hand, although Nicolai stated her niece did not actually cast a vote. The following year, she became a vice president both of her party and of the Senate; she was the first woman to preside over a session of that chamber. While in the Senate, she served on the defence, anti-corruption, equal opportunity, and judiciary committees, including as president of the last from March 2008. During Tăriceanu's time in office from 2004, her name was floated for the Justice, Interior and Defence portfolios, but she was only offered the Labour Ministry when his second cabinet was formed, a nomination she declined.

=== Nomination as Justice Minister ===
In December 2007, following the resignation of Tudor Chiuariu, she was nominated as Justice Minister by Prime Minister Călin Popescu-Tăriceanu; the latter was initially said to have had misgivings about her connections with the secret services and her Communist-era judgeship, but went ahead after public pressure from party colleagues and a near-unanimous vote of approval from the PNL political bureau. Upon being nominated, she vowed to increase the independence of the judiciary and improve its image, to push a new penal code through Parliament (the last one dating to 1969), and to fight corruption. The following month, a series of events ultimately derailed her nomination. President Traian Băsescu began by asking Tăriceanu to withdraw Nicolai, claiming the negative image she had acquired as senator, in particular through the affair involving her niece, would not be conducive to increased public trust in the judiciary. The prime minister responded that, as no legal argument for barring her from the position had been raised, the president had no power to veto the appointment.

Băsescu then declared he would never name Nicolai as Justice Minister, and his office released documents relating to two procedural errors it said she had committed while a prosecutor in Olteniţa. (This came after Tăriceanu refused several telephone calls from Băsescu, and the entire affair formed part of a larger power struggle between the two.) The first referred to a 1987 case where she drew up an indictment and an innocent person was held under arrest for eighteen days as a result—this individual had the same name as the one being sought by the authorities (wanted for wheat theft), but upon realising this, Clinci altered his arrest warrant to match the other man's information rather than reveal the mistake. In a 1991 case (following the 1989 fall of the Communist regime), she represented a foreign citizen in an adoption case, despite her status as prosecutor, and then claimed not to know that the law forbade this; she left her position a month later. Nicolai in turn produced a document indicating the individual in the 1987 case did not spend any time in prison (and calling Băsescu's version of events an "insolent lie"), and said she appeared in the adoption case as a private individual, not a prosecutor, and did not violate the law. Nicolai further opined that the document release was reminiscent of the methods of the Securitate secret police; the PNL's UDMR government partners also weighed in on the prime minister's side, as did the opposition PSD. Others too viewed the document release as "questionable", with several lawyers stressing the confidential nature of the files.

Later, Băsescu asked Tăriceanu to name an interim minister until a permanent officeholder could be found; Defence Minister Teodor Meleşcanu assumed that role. Băsescu and Tăriceanu then held an inconclusive meeting about the Justice portfolio; afterwards, the latter took the case to the Constitutional Court, reiterating his claim that Băsescu lacked the authority to stop the appointment. In early February 2008, the court ruled that Băsescu could legally reject the prime minister's nominee for a vacant ministerial position once, and that Tăriceanu was obliged to choose someone else for the position. By the end of the month, the two had agreed on a new minister, and Cătălin Predoiu took office.

=== Subsequent career ===
At the 2008 election, Nicolai was defeated in her bid for a third Senate term: she finished first in her constituency but failed to obtain a seat under the mixed member proportional representation system introduced at that election. She was re-elected as a PNL vice president at a party congress in March 2009, and at the same time supported Crin Antonescu's successful bid to become party president. In what some saw as a quid pro quo, she was placed first on the party's lists at the June 2009 European Parliament election, where she won a seat. During the subsequent five-year term, she sat on the Committee on Foreign Affairs, where she was vice president of the Subcommittee on Security and Defence. At the May 2014 European Parliament election, again running first on the PNL list, she won another term as an MEP. When her party subsequently left the Alliance of Liberals and Democrats for Europe Group (ALDE) for the European People's Party (EPP), Nicolai opted to remain with the former caucus, which assigned her to the Fisheries Committee. In May 2015, the PNL decided to remove Nicolai as a party member due to her decision to remain with ALDE.
