= Adina-Ioana Vălean =

Romanian politician (born 1968)

Adina-Ioana Vălean MEP
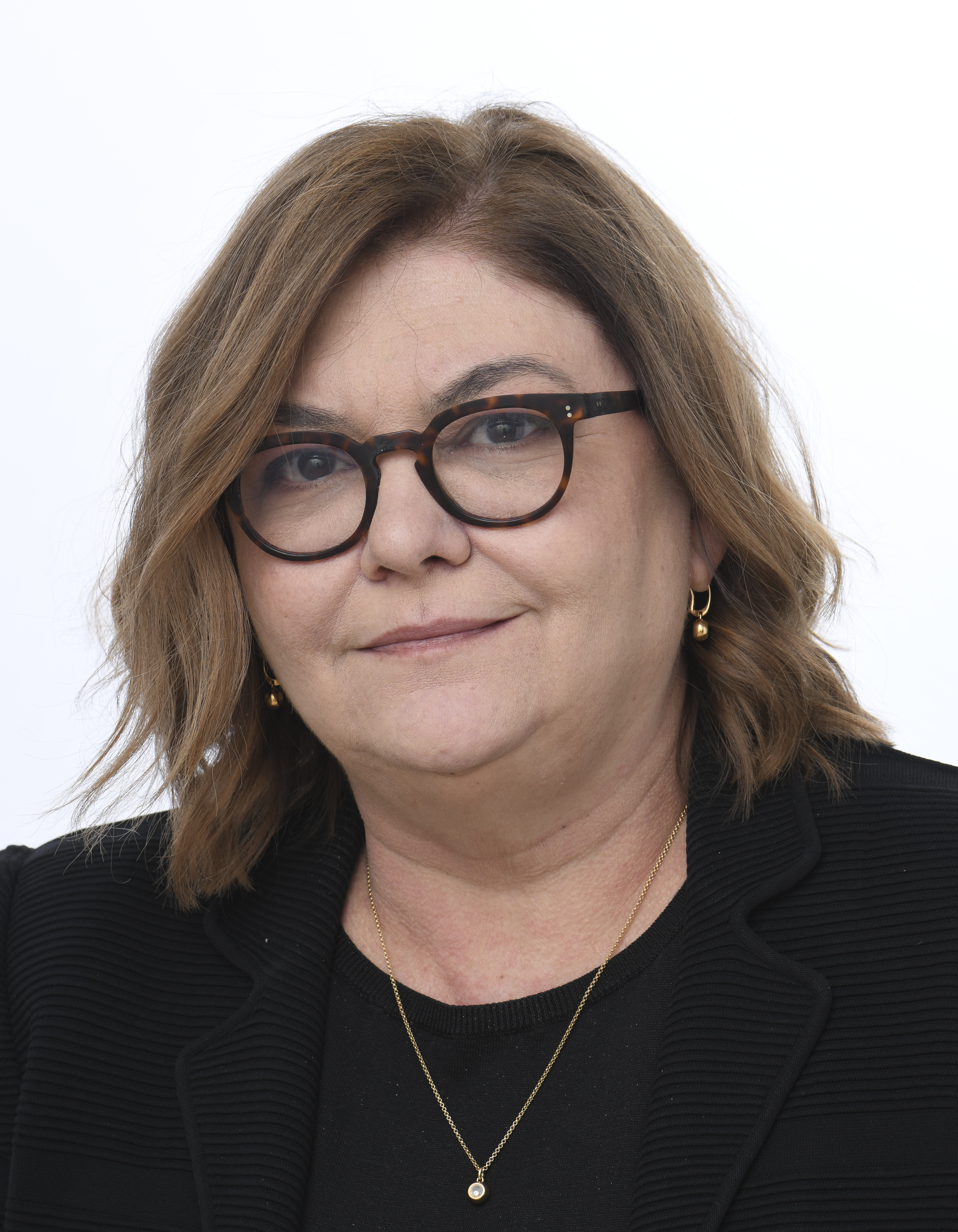
- Official portrait, 2024

Member of the European Parliament for Romania
- Incumbent
- Assumed office 16 July 2024

European Commissioner for Transport
- In office 1 December 2019 – 15 June 2024
- Commission: Von der Leyen I
- Preceded by: Violeta Bulc
- Succeeded by: Apostolos Tzitzikostas

Vice President of the European Parliament
- In office 1 July 2014 – 18 January 2017
- President: Martin Schulz; Antonio Tajani
- Preceded by: Roberta Angelilli
- Succeeded by: Ryszard Czarnecki

Member of the European Parliament for Romania
- In office 1 January 2007 – 1 December 2019

Member of the Chamber of Deputies for Călărași County
- In office 28 November 2004 – 1 January 2007

Personal details
- Born: 16 February 1968 (age 58) Băicoi, Prahova County, Romania
- Party: PNL (since 1999)
- Spouse: Crin Antonescu (m. 2009)
- Children: 1
- Education: University of Bucharest
- Occupation: Mathematician • Politician
- Awards: Order of Merit of Ukraine (2022)
- Website: Official website

Adina-Ioana Vălean (born 16 February 1968) is a Romanian politician who served as European Commissioner for Transport under the leadership of President of the European Commission Ursula von der Leyen from 2019 until June 2024. She served as a Member of the European Parliament from 2007 until 2019, where she chaired the European Parliament Committee on Industry, Research and Energy in 2019. In the 2024 European elections she was again elected and became a member of the European Parliament.

== Education ==
Vălean has a master's degree in European Integration and Security Studies, postgraduate studies in National Security and Defence Management and a bachelor's degree in Mathematics.

== Political career ==
=== Career in national politics ===
A member of the National Liberal Party (PNL), and a member of the European Peoples Party, Vălean was elected to the Chamber of Deputies on the Justice and Truth list for Călărași County (during the 2004 elections).

=== Member of the European Parliament, 2007–2019 ===
Vălean became a Member of the European Parliament on 1 January 2007, with the accession of Romania to the European Union. Throughout her time in parliament, she served on the Committee on Industry, Research and Energy; in 2019, she became the committee's chairwoman. During her time on the committee, she was the Parliament's rapporteur for the Connecting Europe Facility (CEF) and the European Union roaming regulations.

From 2014 to 2017, Vălean was one of the Vice-Presidents of the European Parliament under the leadership of President Antonio Tajani; in that capacity, she was in charge of information and communications technology (ICT). She also chaired the Committee on the Environment, Public Health and Food Safety from 2017 until 2019 and served on the Committee on Petitions from 2009 until 2014.

In addition to her committee assignments, Vălean was part of the Parliaments delegations with the countries of Southeast Europe (2007–2009); the Euronest Parliamentary Assembly (2009–2014); and the United States (since 2014). She was also a member of the Transatlantic Legislators' Dialogue (TLD); the European Internet Forum; and the European Parliament Intergroup on Long Term Investment and Reindustrialisation.

=== European Commissioner for Transport, 2019–2024 ===
In November 2019, the center-right government under Prime Minister Ludovic Orban put Vălean and Siegfried Mureșan forward as candidates to be the country's next European Commissioner. Vălean was subsequently picked to be the European Commissioner for Transport by President of the European Commission Ursula von der Leyen.

In early March 2020, Vălean was appointed by von der Leyen to serve on the commission's special task force to coordinate the European Union's response to the COVID-19 pandemic.

=== Member of the European Parliament, 2024–present ===
In the 2024 European elections, Vălean was re-elected to the European Parliament. In order to fulfil her mandate, she resigned from her position as EU Commissioner on 15 July 2024. Her duties were temporarily taken over by Wopke Hoekstra, Commissioner for Climate Action.

== Personal life ==
Vălean is married to Crin Antonescu and has one child.

She was born in Băicoi.

Political offices
Preceded by Corina Crețu	Romanian European Commissioner; 2019–2024
