= 2007 European Parliament election in Romania =

- November 25, 2007

All 35 seats of Romania in the European Parliament
- Turnout: 29.46%
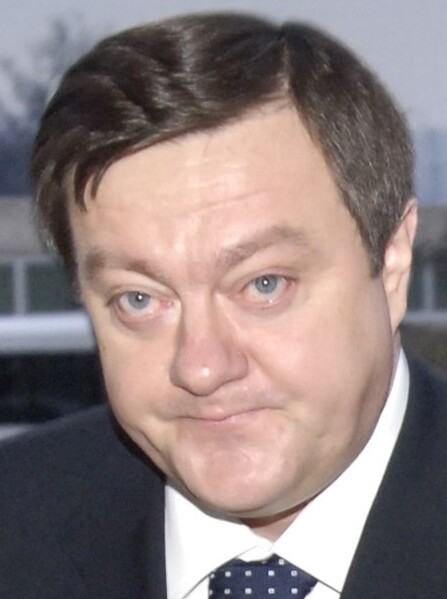

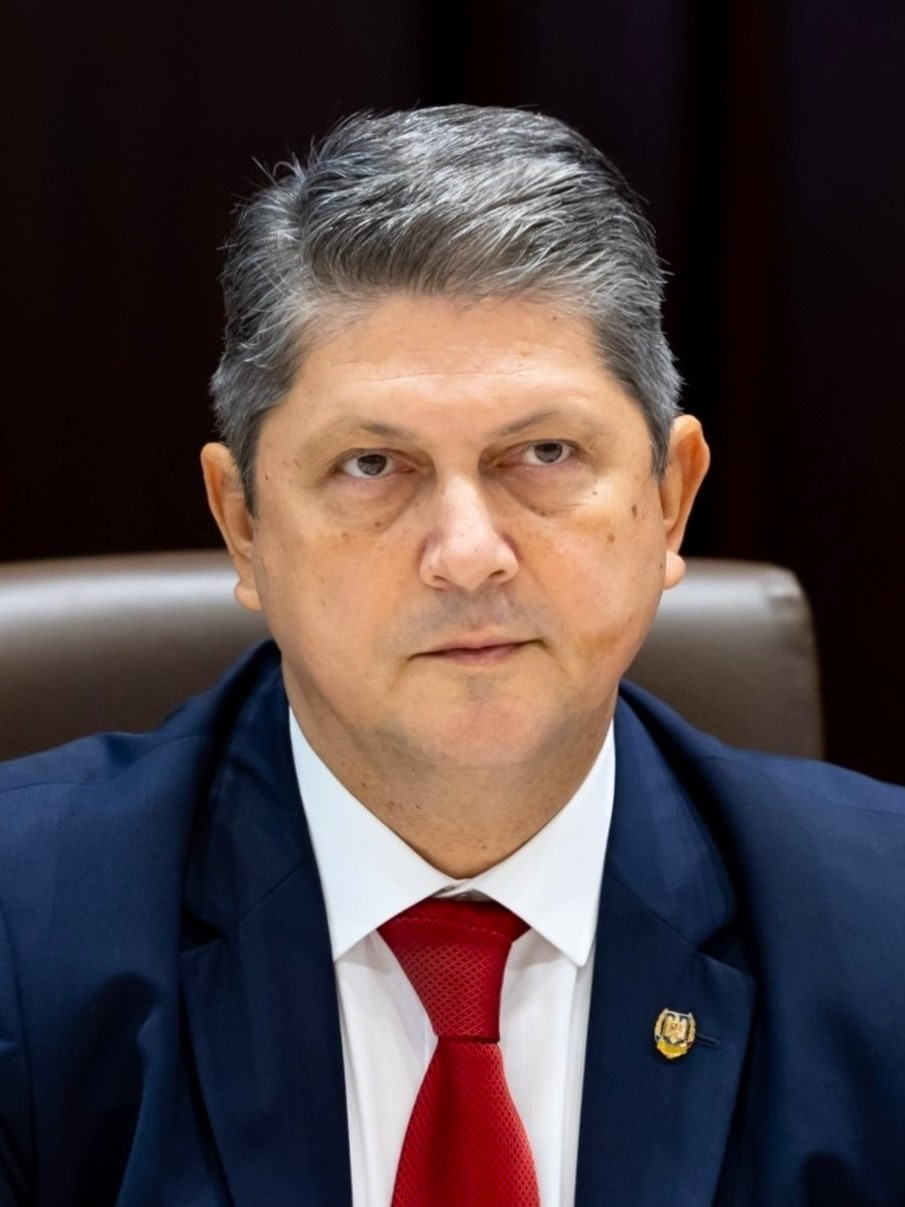

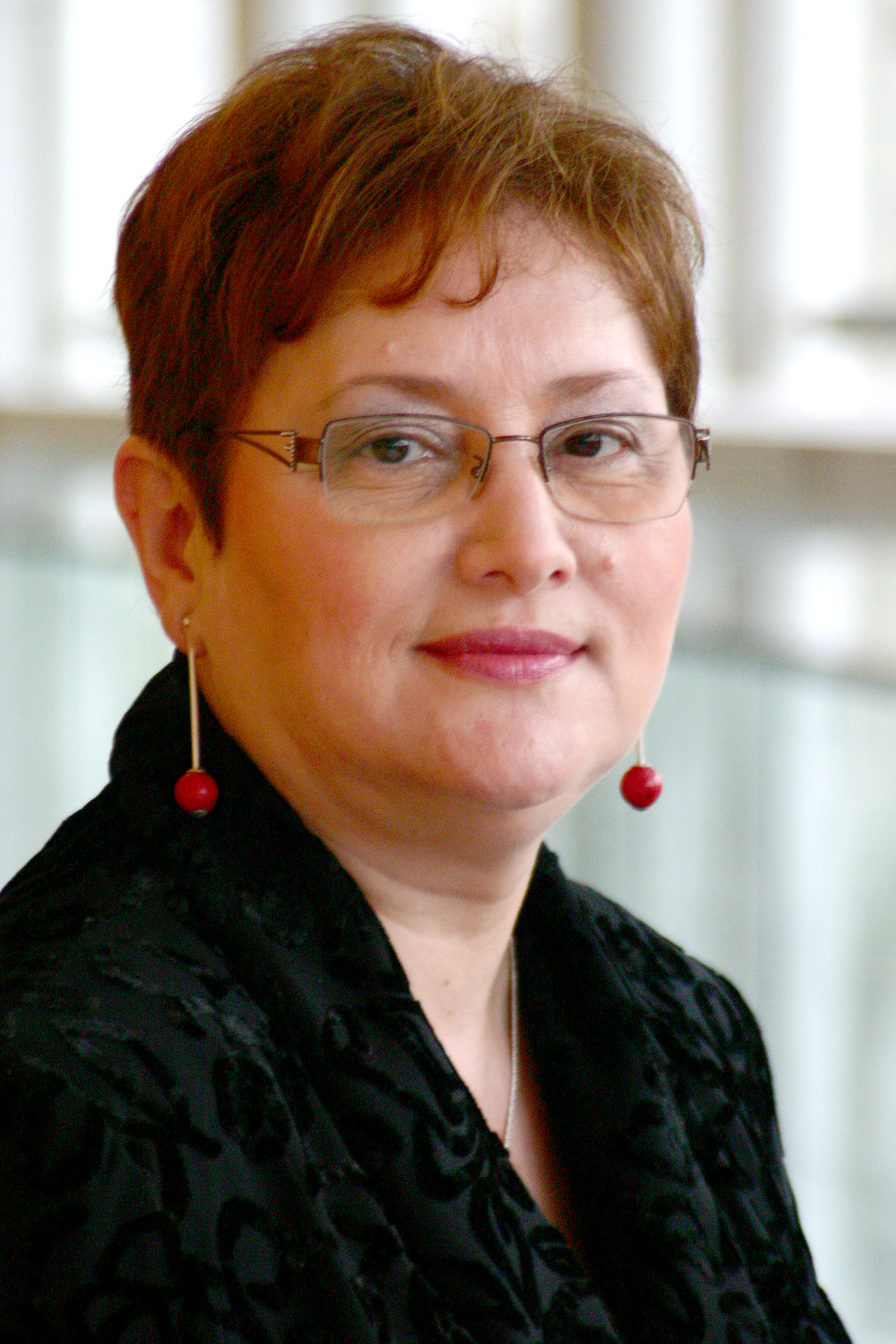

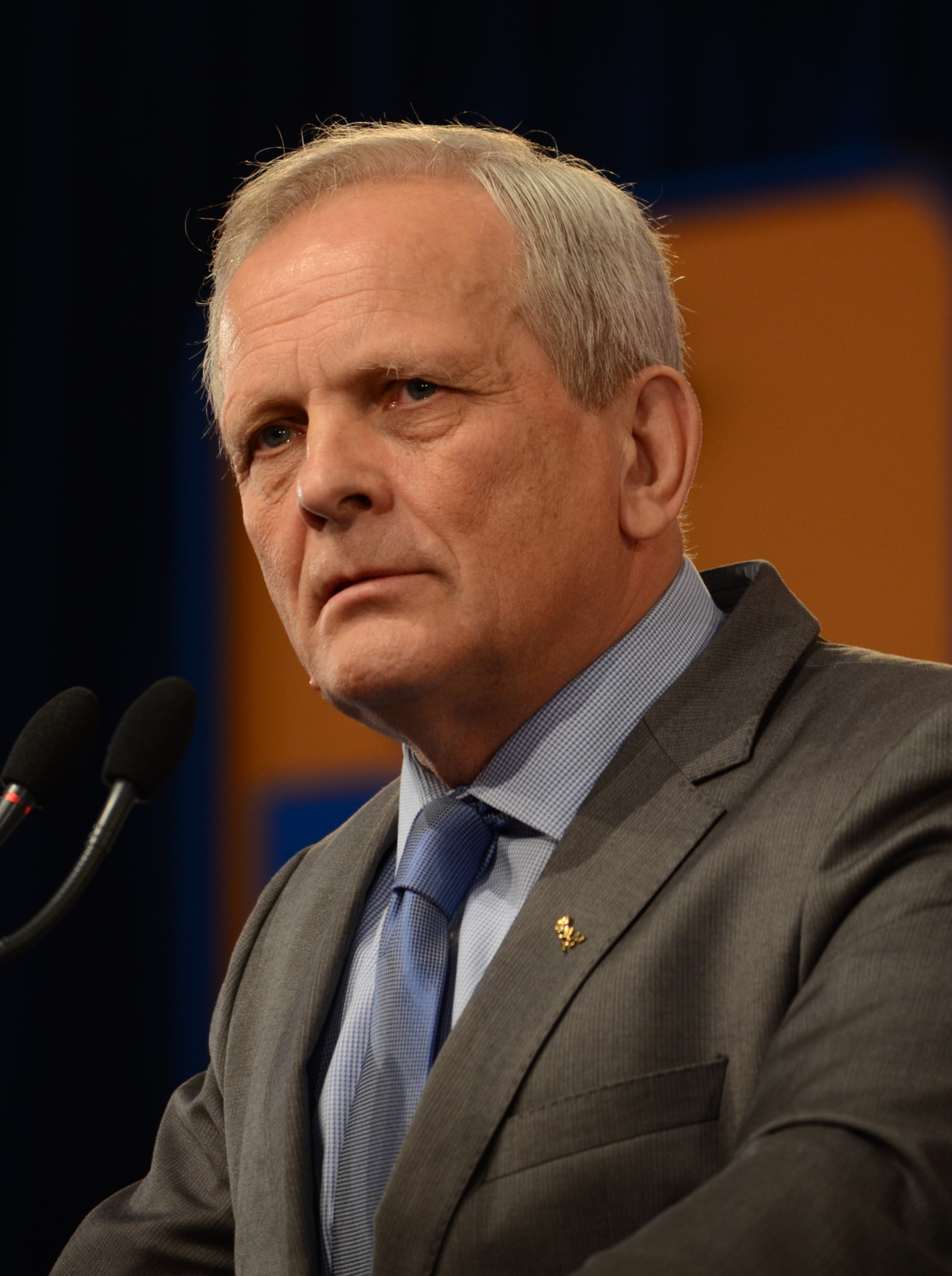

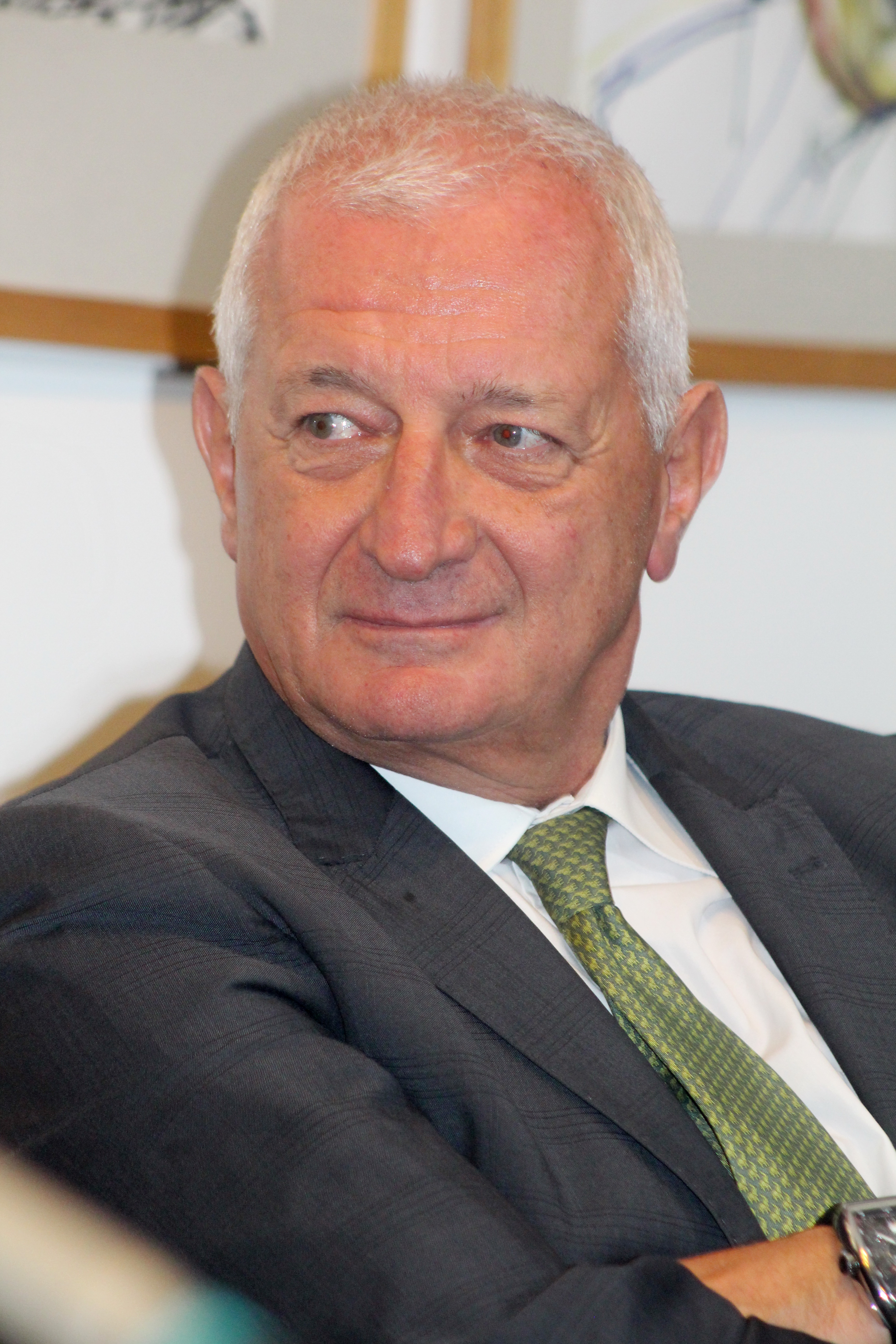
	First party	Second party	Third party
Leader	Sorin Frunzăverde	Titus Corlățean	Renate Weber
Party	PD	PSD	PNL
Seats won	13	10	6
Popular vote	1,476,105	1,184,018	688,859
Percentage	28.81%	23.11%	13.44%
	Fourth party	Fifth party
Leader	Theodor Stolojan	György Frunda
Party	PLD	RMDSZ
Seats won	3	2
Popular vote	398,901	282,929
Percentage	7.78%	5.52%

Romania elected its members of the European Parliament for the first time on 25 November 2007; the election was initially scheduled for 13 May, but the PM postponed it for domestic political reasons. A referendum on a new voting system for national parliamentary elections was held on the same day.

== Pre-election situation ==
Romania joined the European Union on 1 January 2007, and was initially represented in the European Parliament by 35 observers as follows:

Party	Group	Seats
Social Democratic Party	PES	12
National Liberal Party	ALDE	6
Democratic Party	EPP-ED	5
Greater Romania Party	ITS/NI	5
Democratic Union of Hungarians in Romania	EPP-ED	3
Conservative Party	ALDE	2
Democratic Forum of Germans in Romania	EPP-ED	1
Independent	ITS/NI	1

== Opinion polls ==
Polling Firm	Date	Source	PD	PSD	PNL	PNG	PRM	UDMR/RMDSZ	PLD	PC	Undecided
CURS	1 July 2007		43%	10%	12%	8%	5%	5%	<5%	<5%	—N/a
IMAS	1 August 2007		31.7%	12.8%	9.4%	9.3%	3.4%	2.7%	2.2%	—N/a	26.3%
CURS	5 September 2007		35%	24%	13%	8%	5%	5%	<5%	<5%	—N/a
CCSB	21-29/9/2007		37.2%	21.5%	12.6%	8.4%	5.6%	3.9%	<5%	4.1%	—N/a
Insomar	10-17/10/2007		42%	19%	13%	5%	5%	5%	3%	3%	—N/a
IMAS	10-22/10/2007		37%	18%	16%	8%	6%	6%	5%	—N/a	—N/a
CIVIS	24 October 2007		27.1%	20.7%	20.6%	8.8%	4.8%	4.4%	5.7%	1.9%	—N/a
ATLE	6-11/11/2007		33.5%	25.0%	9.5%	5.5%	5.9%	4.9%	4.7%	4.5%	—N/a
Insomar	8-13/11/2007		40%	19%	13%	5%	6%	5%	6%	4%	—N/a
BCS	10-15/11/2007		35%	23%	14%	5.6%	4%	4%	4.7%	3.3%	—N/a
ATLE	13-18/11/2007		32.1%	26.0%	9.5%	4.9%	6.3%	4.6%	5.2%	5.1%	—N/a
CSOP	17-19/11/2007		38.2%	19.5%	12.9%	7.3%	4.8%	4.6%	6.2%	2.2%	—N/a

== Results ==
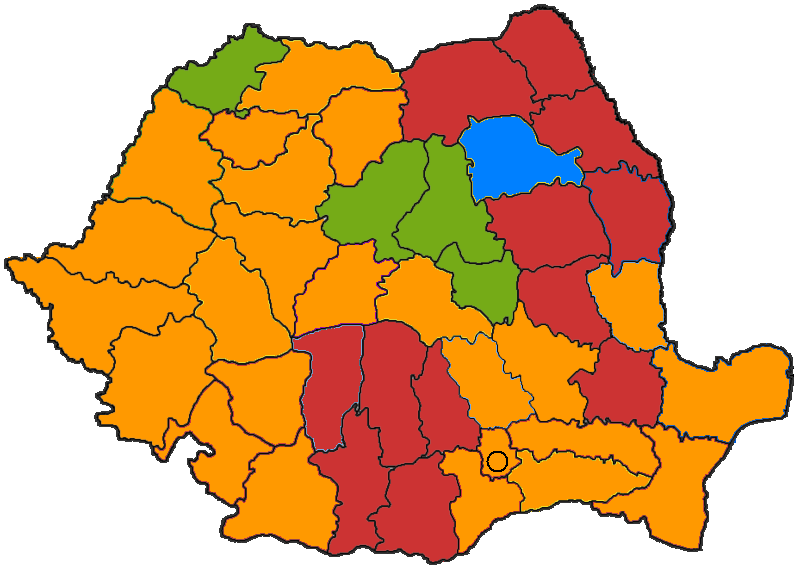
Map of the Romanian counties based on the winning party Democratic Party Social Democratic Party Democratic Union of Hungarians in Romania Liberal Democratic Party

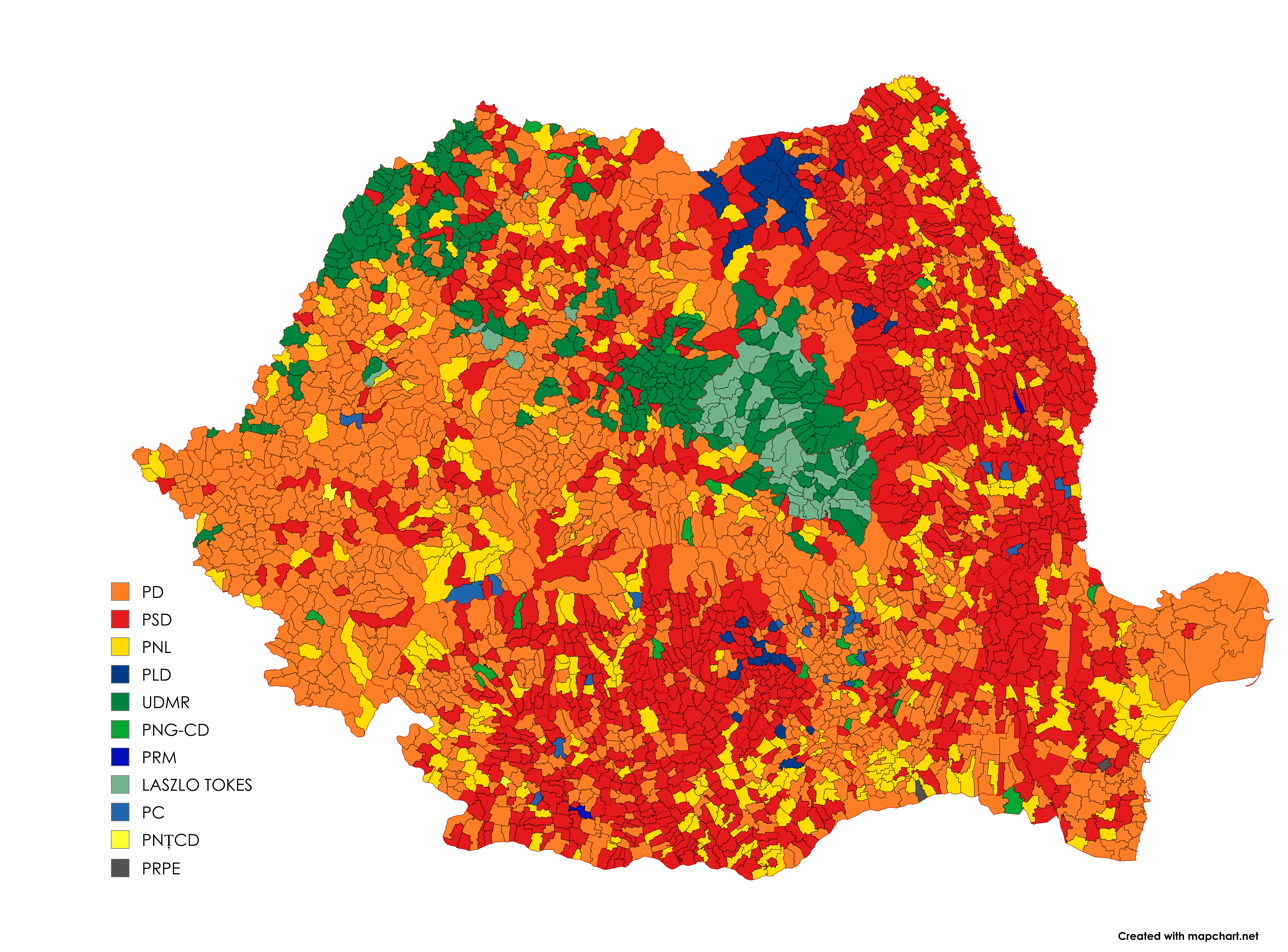
Results of the 2007 European Parliament elections in Romania, showing the number of votes for the party that won a plurality in each locality.

35 MEPs were appointed by Rom

ania to serve as observers in the Parliament before the country joined in 2007. Since then up until the election, the observers served as full MEPs.

Party	Votes	%	Seats
Democratic Party	1,476,105	28.82	13
Social Democratic Party	1,184,018	23.12	10
National Liberal Party	688,859	13.45	6
Liberal Democratic Party	398,901	7.79	3
Democratic Union of Hungarians in Romania	282,929	5.52	2
New Generation Party – Christian Democratic	248,863	4.86	0
Greater Romania Party	212,596	4.15	0
Conservative Party	150,385	2.94	0
National Initiative Party	124,829	2.44	0
Christian Democratic National Peasants' Party	71,001	1.39	0
Party of the Roma Pro-Europa	58,903	1.15	0
Socialist Alliance Party	28,484	0.56	0
Green Party	19,820	0.39	0
Independents	176,533	3.45	1
Total	5,122,226	100.00	35
Valid votes	5,122,226	95.41	
Invalid/blank votes	246,555	4.59	
Total votes	5,368,781	100.00	
Registered voters/turnout	18,224,597	29.46	
Source: ROAEP

== See also ==
- Elections in Romania
- Elections in the European Union
- 2007 European Parliament election in Bulgaria
- Romania (European Parliament constituency)
