= Corina Crețu =

Romanian politician (born 1967)

Corina Crețu KSR
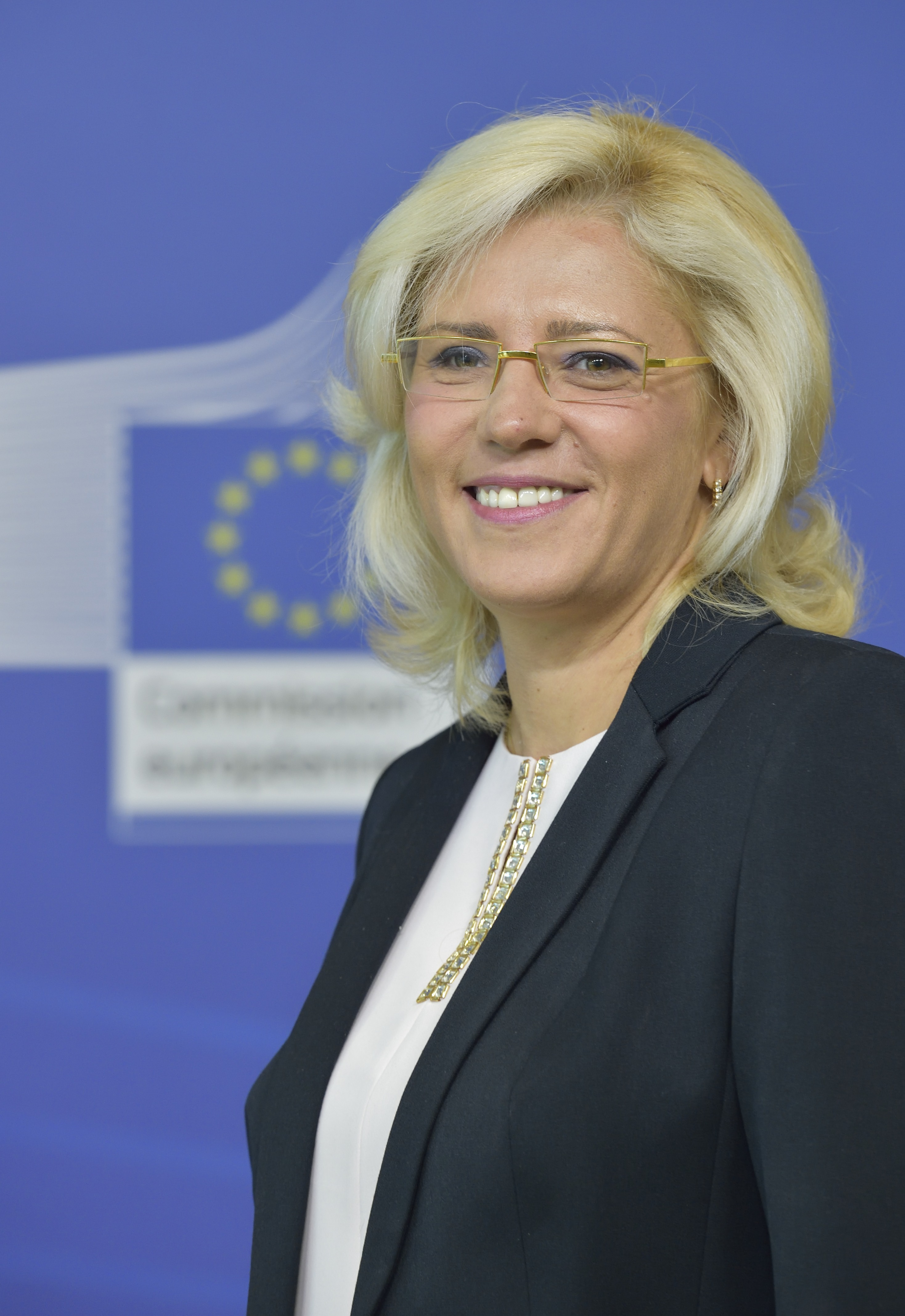
- Official portrait, 2014

European Commissioner for Cohesion and Reforms
- In office 1 November 2014 – 1 July 2019
- Commission: Juncker
- Preceded by: Johannes Hahn
- Succeeded by: Johannes Hahn (Acting)

Personal details
- Born: 24 June 1967 (age 59) Bucharest, Socialist Republic of Romania
- Party: Social Democratic Party (Before 2019); PRO Romania (2019–2024); Independent (2024-)
- Spouse: Ovidiu Rogoz (m. 2012)
- Education: Bucharest University of Economic Studies

Corina Crețu KSR (born 24 June 1967) is Consul General, head of the Consulate General of Romania in Thessaloniki, Hellenic Republic.

Crețu is a former European Commissioner for Cohesion and Reforms. and Member of the European Parliament (sitting with the Progressive Alliance of Socialists and Democrats). Between June 2014 and October 2014, she served as a Vice-President of the European Parliament.

== Political career ==
Crețu studied at the Academy of Economic Studies, Faculty of Cybernetics, graduating in 1989. She spent a year working as an economist at a factory in Blaj until 1990. She then worked as a journalist and political commentator between 1990 and 1992 for newspapers Azi, Curierul Național, and Cronica Română before joining the Spokesperson's office of the Cabinet of President Ion Iliescu (1992-1996).

In 1996, she became a member of the Romanian Social Democratic Party (PDSR).

Between 2000 and 2004, Crețu was Presidential Advisor, Presidential Spokesperson and Head of the Public Communication Department during Ion Iliescu's second mandate as Romanian president.

In 2000 she was elected Deputy in Romania's Parliament and, in 2004, to the Romanian Senate. As a Senator, she sat on the Foreign Policy Committee, and was a full member of the Romanian Delegation to the Parliamentary Assembly of the OSCE. In January 2005, at the invitation of the Jordanian Government, she conducted a training seminar at Amman for appointees to spokesperson positions in Iraq. Crețu was also an OSCE observer to the parliamentary election of March 2005 in Moldova and to the general election of 2006 in Bosnia and Herzegovina.

In 2005, Crețu was appointed a member of the Romanian parliamentary delegation to the European Parliament. She was elected Member of the European Parliament (MEP), sitting with the Progressive Alliance of Socialists and Democrats on January 1, 2007 following the accession of Romania to the European Union, being re-elected as an MEP in 2009 and 2014.

In 2013, she was elected vice-president of the Romanian Social Democratic Party (PSD).

Crețu announced on 17 January 2019 that she would be a candidate in the European Parliament election on behalf of the party Pro Romania. She was at the second position in the list after Victor Ponta.

She joined Victor Ponta's PRO Romania in March 2019.

== Personal life ==
Her father, Traian Crețu (1937–1995), was Professor of Physics at the Politehnica University of Bucharest. Her mother, Verginia Crețu is a child development psychologist and was a professor at the University of Bucharest.

In 2012, Crețu married Ovidiu Rogoz, a Romanian businessman, at the New Church of St Spyridon in Bucharest.

Personal e-mails Cretu had exchanged with then U.S. Secretary of State Colin Powell were accessed by the hacker Guccifer, who broke into Powell’s personal email account and posted a link to some of the correspondence on Powell’s Facebook page. Powell said in a statement that he had stayed in touch with Cretu by email since stepping down as secretary of state in 2005, and that "over time the emails became of a very personal nature, but did not result in an affair.” He added that "those types of emails ended a few years ago. There was no affair then and there is not one now.”

== Honours ==
- Cavaler, Order of the Star of Romania (2013)

Political offices
Preceded by Dacian Cioloş	Romanian European Commissioner; 2014–2019	Succeeded by Adina-Ioana Vălean; Nominee
Preceded by Johannes Hahn	European Commissioner for Regional Policy; 2014–2019	Succeeded by Johannes Hahn; Acting
