= Alliance of Liberals and Democrats for Europe =

Former liberal European political alliance

Alliance of Liberals and Democrats for Europe Alliance des Démocrates et des Libéraux pour l'Europe
- Founded: 20 July 2004
- Dissolved: 2019
- Ideology: Liberalism; Pro-Europeanism
- Political position: Centre to centre-right
- European Parliament group: Renew Europe; European Conservatives and Reformists (Jaak Madison)
- International affiliation: Liberal International

The Alliance of Liberals and Democrats for Europe (ALDE; French: Alliance des Démocrates et des Libéraux pour l'Europe, ADLE) was a transnational alliance between two European political parties, the Alliance of Liberals and Democrats for Europe Party and the European Democratic Party. ALDE had political groups in the European Parliament, the EU Committee of the Regions, the Parliamentary Assembly of the Council of Europe and the NATO Parliamentary Assembly. There were assorted independents in these groups as well as national-level affiliate parties of the European-level parties.

The pro-European platform of ALDE espoused liberal economics, and supported for European integration and the European single market.

Following the 2019 European Parliament election, Renew Europe replaced the Alliance of Liberals and Democrats for Europe group from the 2014−2019 Parliament, and ALDE, as a political alliance between the ALDE Party and the EDP, ceased to be mentioned.

== Committee of the Regions ==
=== Foundation ===
Following the creation of the ALDE group in the European Parliament, which occurred half-way during the third mandate of the Committee of the Regions (CoR), the members of the ELDR Group in the CoR rapidly entered into talks with the CoR members belonging to the EDP Party with a view to replicating a similar arrangement within the CoR. Under the presidency of Kent Johansson, Executive Member of the Swedish Region of Västra Götaland, the ELDR Group of the Committee of the Regions unanimously agreed in February 2005 to change its name to the ALDE Group and to accept the EDP members to the group. In doing so, the group adopted a new mission statement (see below). The current president of the group is Bart Somers, Mayor of Mechelen and leader of the liberal group in the Flemish Parliament.
