= List of ministers of finance of Romania =

A list of ministers of finance of Romania:

== Before independence (1862–1877) ==
- Alexandru C. Moruzi – 22 January 1862 – 27 January 1862
- Grigore Balș – 27 January 1862 – 1 March 1862
- Alexandru Catargi – 11 March 1862 – 24 March 1862
- Teodor Ghica – 24 March 1862 – 12 July 1862
- Alexandru Cantacuzino – 12 July 1862 – 30 September 1862
- Alexandru Cantacuzino – 30 September 1862 – 16 March 1863
- Constantin I. Iliescu – 16 March 1863 – 31 July 1863
- Constantin I. Iliescu – 31 July 1863 – 11 October 1863
- Ludovic Steege – 11 October 1863 – 21 January 1865
- Nicolae Rosetti-Bălănescu – 21 January 1865 – 26 January 1865
- Ion Strat – 26 January 1865 – 14 June 1865
- Nicolae Kretzulescu – 14 June 1865 – 30 January 1866
- Ioan Oteteleșanu – 30 January 1866 – 11 February 1866
- Dimitrie A. Sturdza – 11 February 1866 – 16 February 1866
- Petre Mavrogheni – 16 February 1866 – 10 May 1866
- Ion C. Brătianu – 11 May 1866 – 13 July 1866
- Petre Mavrogheni – 15 July 1866 – 21 February 1867
- Alexandru Văsescu – 1 March 1867 – 4 August 1867
- Ludovic Steege – 17 August 1867 – 1 October 1867
- Grigore Arghiropol – 1 October 1867 – 27 October 1867
- Ion C. Brătianu – 27 October 1867 – 13 November 1867
- Ion C. Brătianu – 13 November 1867 – 29 April 1868
- Ion C. Brătianu – 1 May 1868 – 12 August 1868
- Ion C. Brătianu – 12 August 1868 – 16 November 1868
- Alexandru G. Golescu – 16 November 1868 – 27 January 1870
- Ioan A. Cantacuzino – 2 February 1870 – 30 March 1870
- Constantin Grădișteanu – 20 April 1870 – 14 December 1870
- Dimitrie A. Sturdza – 18 December 1870 – 11 March 1871
- Petre Mavrogheni – 11 March 1871 – 7 January 1875
- Gheorghe Grigore Cantacuzino – 7 January 1875 – 30 January 1876
- Ion Strat – 30 January 1876 – 31 March 1876
- Gen. Christian Tell – 4 April 1876 – 26 April 1876
- Ion C. Brătianu – 27 April 1876 – 27 January 1877
- Dimitrie A. Sturdza – 27 January 1877 – 21 February 1877
- Ion C. Brătianu – 21 February 1877 – 20 August 1877

== Independence to World War I (1878–1918) ==
- Ion Câmpineanu – 20 August 1877 – 23 September 1877
- Ion Câmpineanu – 23 September 1877 – 25 November 1878
- Dimitrie A. Sturdza – 25 November 1878 – 16 February 1880
- Ion C. Brătianu – 16 February 1880 – 25 February 1880
- Ion Câmpineanu – 25 February 1880 – 15 July 1880
- Ion C. Brătianu – 15 July 1880 – 24 October 1880
- Ion C. Brătianu – 24 October 1880 – 5 April 1881
- Col. Nicolae Dabija – 10 April 1881 – 11 April 1881
- Dimitrie A. Sturdza – 11 April 1881 – 8 June 1881
- Ion C. Brătianu – 9 June 1881 – 1 December 1881
- Gheorghe Chițu – 1 December 1881 – 25 January 1882
- Gheorghe Lecca – 25 January 1882 – 30 August 1885
- Constantin Nacu – 13 September 1885 – 16 December 1885
- Constantin Nacu – 16 December 1885 – 1 March 1888
- Dimitrie A. Sturdza – 1 March 1888 – 20 March 1888
- Menelas Ghermani – 23 March 1888 – 26 March 1889
- George D. Vernescu – 29 March 1889 – 3 November 1889
- Menelas Ghermani – 5 November 1889 – 15 February 1891
- George D. Vernescu – 21 February 1891 – 25 November 1891
- Alexandru B. Știrbei – 27 November 1891 – 18 December 1891
- Menelas Ghermani – 18 December 1891 – 3 October 1895
- Gheorghe Cantacuzino-Râfoveanu – 4 October 1895 – 13 March 1897
- Vasile Lascăr – 13 March 1897 – 26 March 1897
- Gheorghe Cantacuzino-Râfoveanu – 31 March 1897 – 1 October 1898
- George D. Pallade – 1 October 1898 – 30 March 1899
- Gen. Gheorghe Manu – 11 April 1899 – 9 January 1900
- Take Ionescu – 9 January 1900 7 July 1900
- Petre P. Carp – 7 July 1900 – 13 February 1901
- George D. Pallade – 14 February 1901 – 9 January 1902
- Dimitrie A. Sturdza – 9 January 1902 – 18 July 1902
- Emil Costinescu – 18 July 1902 – 20 December 1904
- Take Ionescu – 22 December 1904 – 12 March 1907
- Emil Costinescu – 12 March 1907 – 15 December 1910
- Petre P. Carp – 29 December 1910 – 28 March 1912
- Theodor Rosetti – 28 March 1912 – 14 October 1912
- Alexandru Marghiloman – 14 October 1912 – 31 December 1913
- Emil Costinescu – 4 January 1914 – 11 December 1916
- Victor Antonescu – 11 December 1916 – 10 July 1917
- Nicolae Titulescu – 10 July 1917 – 26 January 1918
- Fotin Enescu – 29 January 1918 – 27 February 1918
- Mihail Seulescu – 6 March 1918 – 4 September 1918
- Constantin C. Arion – 4 September 1918 – 24 October 1918
- Fotin Enescu – 24 October 1918 – 29 October 1918
- Oscar Kiriacescu – 29 October 1918 – 12 September 1919

== Interwar era and World War II (1918–1945) ==
- Gen. Ioan Popescu – 27 September 1919 – 6 October 1919
- Ion Angelescu – 6 October 1919 – 28 November 1919
- Aurel Vlad – 1 December 1919 – 23 February 1920
- Mihai Popovici – 23 February 1920 – 13 March 1920
- Constantin Argetoianu – 13 March 1920 – 13 June 1920
- Nicolae Titulescu – 13 June 1920 – 13 December 1921
- Take Ionescu – 17 December 1921 – 17 January 1922
- Vintilă Brătianu – 19 January 1922 – 27 March 1926
- Ion Lapedatu – 30 March 1926 – 19 March 1927
- Gen. Alexandru Averescu – 19 March 1927 – 4 June 1927
- Barbu Știrbey – 4 June 1927 – 6 June 1927
- Mihai Popovici – 6 June 1927 – 20 June 1927
- Vintilă Brătianu – 22 June 1927 – 3 November 1928
- Mihai Popovici – 10 November 1928 – 15 October 1929
- Iuliu Maniu – 15 October 1929 – 26 October 1929
- Virgil Madgearu – 26 October 1929 – 14 November 1929
- Virgil Madgearu – 14 November 1929 – 7 June 1930
- Ion Răducanu – 7 June 1930 – 8 June 1930
- Mihai Popovici – 13 June 1930 – 8 October 1930
- Mihai Popovici – 10 October 1930 – 4 April 1931
- Constantin Argetoianu – 18 April 1931 – 31 May 1932
- Gheorghe Mironescu – 6 June 1932 – 17 October 1932
- Virgil Madgearu – 20 October 1932 – 12 January 1933
- Virgil Madgearu – 14 January 1933 – 9 November 1933
- Dinu Brătianu – 14 November 1933 – 3 January 1934
- Victor Slăvescu – 5 January 1934 – 1 February 1935
- Victor Antonescu – 1 February 1935 – 29 August 1936
- Mircea Cancicov – 29 August 1936 – 14 November 1937
- Mircea Cancicov – 17 November 1937 – 28 December 1937
- Eugen Savu – 28 December 1937 – 10 February 1938
- Mircea Cancicov – 10 February 1938 – 1 February 1939
- Mitiță Constantinescu – 1 February 1939 – 4 July 1940
- Gheorghe N. Leon – 4 July 1940 – 14 September 1940
- George Cretzianu – 14 September 1940 – 27 January 1941
- Gen. Nicolae N. Stoenescu – 27 January 1941 – 8 April 1942
- Ion C. Marinescu – 8 April 1942 – 25 September 1942
- Alexandru D. Neagu – 25 September 1942 – 1 April 1944
- Gheron Netta – 1 April 1944 – 23 August 1944
- Gen. Gheorghe Potopeanu – 23 August 1944 – 13 October 1944
- Gen. Constantin Sănătescu – 13 October 1944 – 4 November 1944
- Mihail Romniceanu – 4 November 1944 – 28 February 1945
- Dumitru Alimănișteanu – 6 March 1945 – 11 April 1945
- Mircea Duma – 11 April 1945 – 24 August 1945
- Alexandru Alexandrini – 23 August 1945 – 7 November 1947

== Socialist Republic of Romania (1947–1989) ==
- Vasile Luca – 7 November 1947 – 9 March 1952
- Dumitru Petrescu – 9 March 1952 – 3 October 1955
- Manea Mănescu – 3 October 1955 – 19 March 1957
- Aurel Vijoli – 19 March 1957 – 16 July 1968
- Virgil Pîrvu – 16 July 1968 – 19 August 1969
- Florea Dumitrescu – 19 August 1969 – 7 March 1978
- Paul Niculescu-Mizil – 7 March 1978 – 30 March 1981
- Petre Gigea – 30 March 1981 – 26 August 1986
- Alexandru Babe – 26 August 1986 – 7 December 1987
- Gheorghe Paraschiv – 7 December 1987 – 28 March 1989
- Ion Pățan – 28 March 1989 – 22 December 1989

== Post-communist Romania (1989–present) ==
Minister of Finance of Romania	Term start	Term end	Number of days in office
Ion Pățan	26 December 1989	28 June 1990	184
Theodor Stolojan	28 June 1990	30 April 1991	306
Eugen Dijmărescu	30 April 1991	26 September 1991	149
George Danielescu	26 September 1991	19 November 1992	420
Florin Georgescu	19 November 1992	11 December 1996	1483
Mircea Ciumara	12 December 1996	5 December 1997	358
Daniel Dăianu	5 December 1997	23 September 1998	292
Decebal Traian Remeș	23 September 1998	28 December 2000	827
Mihai Tănăsescu	28 December 2000	28 December 2004	1461
Ionuț Popescu	29 December 2004	22 August 2005	236
Sebastian Vlădescu	22 August 2005	5 April 2007	591
Varujan Vosganian	5 April 2007	22 December 2008	627
Gheorghe Pogea	22 December 2008	23 December 2009	366
Sebastian Vlădescu	23 December 2009	3 September 2010	254
Gheorghe Ialomițianu	3 September 2010	9 February 2012	524
Bogdan Alexandru Drăgoi	9 February 2012	7 May 2012	88
Florin Georgescu	7 May 2012	21 December 2012	228
Daniel Chițoiu	21 December 2012	3 March 2014	437
Ioana Petrescu	4 March 2014	17 December 2014	288
Darius Vâlcov	17 December 2014	30 March 2015	103
Eugen Teodorovici	30 March 2015	17 November 2015	232
Anca Dragu	17 November 2015	4 January 2017	414
Viorel Ştefan	4 January 2017	29 June 2017	176
Ionuţ Misa	29 June 2017	29 January 2018	214
Eugen Teodorovici	29 January 2018	4 November 2019	644
Florin Cîțu	4 November 2019	23 December 2020	395
Alexandru Nazare	23 December 2020	8 July 2021	187
Florin Cîțu ad interim	8 July 2021	18 August 2021	41
Dan Vîlceanu	18 August 2021	25 November 2021	99
Adrian Câciu	25 November 2021	15 June 2023	567
Marcel Boloș	15 June 2023	23 December 2024	558
Barna Tánczos	23 December 2024	23 June 2025	183
Alexandru Nazare	23 June 2025	present	
