= Decebal Traian Remeș =

Romanian politician (1949–2020)

Minister of Finance
- In office 23 September 1998 – 28 December 2000
- President: Emil Constantinescu
- Prime Minister: Radu Vasile; Mugur Isărescu
- Preceded by: Daniel Dăianu
- Succeeded by: Mihai Tănăsescu

Minister of Agriculture, and Rural Development
- In office 4 April 2007 – 11 October 2007
- President: Traian Băsescu
- Prime Minister: Călin Popescu-Tăriceanu
- Preceded by: Dan Motreanu
- Succeeded by: Dacian Cioloș

Personal details
- Born: 26 June 1949 Băsești, Maramureș County, Romanian People's Republic
- Died: 14 February 2020 (aged 70) Baia Mare, Romania
- Party: National Liberal Party (PNL)
- Other political affiliations: Christian Democratic National Peasants' Party (PNȚ-CD)
- Spouse: Steliana Remeș
- Education: University of Iași
- Occupation: Economist

Decebal Traian Remeș (26 June 1949 – 14 February 2020) was a Romanian economist and politician. A member of the National Liberal Party (PNL), he was a member of the Romanian Chamber of Deputies for Maramureș County from 1996 to 2000. In the Radu Vasile and Mugur Isărescu cabinets, he served as Finance Minister from 1998 to 2000, while in the Călin Popescu-Tăriceanu cabinet, he was Minister of Agriculture during 2007.

== Biography ==
Born in Băsești, Maramureș County, he graduated from the Economic Studies Faculty of the University of Iași in 1971. From that year until 1978, he was an economist at an electronics factory in Săcele, and from 1973 to 1978, he taught as assistant professor at the University of Brașov. From 1978 to 1980, he was an inspector at a firm in his native county, followed by a position as chief accountant at a railway parts manufacturer there, from 1980 to 1990. Following the 1989 Revolution, he was economic director and then director of a Baia Mare firm. From 1995 to 1996, he headed a bank in that city. He has eleven published articles about finance and accounting in an economic magazine.

Joining the PNL in 1991, he was vice president of its Maramureș County chapter from 1992 to 1993 and president from 1993 to 1996. His first elective office came in 1992–1995, when he was vice president and then president of the Maramureș County Council. Elected to the Chamber in 1996 on the lists of the victorious Romanian Democratic Convention (CDR), he served a four-year term there, sitting on the budget, finance and banking committee, including as president from 1997 to 1998. During this period, he was named Finance Minister in September 1998, following the dismissal of Daniel Dăianu, serving in the Vasile and Isărescu cabinets until December 2000, when the CDR lost power following an election. As minister, he had to deal with the fallout from the 1998 Russian financial crisis, which threatened to bankrupt Romania. During the summer of 2000, he submitted his resignation as minister due to the PNL's intention to form a left-wing alliance at the forthcoming elections; Isărescu rejected this, but he nonetheless left the PNL due to a perceived leftward shift in policy, to the party's nomination of Teodor Stolojan and not Isărescu to contest the upcoming presidential election, and to a rivalry with leading party figure Valeriu Stoica.

From 2001 to 2007, Remeș returned to private life, working as economic director for a Baia Mare agricultural firm. He also belonged to a number of political parties after quitting the PNL. He became head of a PNL splinter group in 2000, then joined the Christian Democratic National Peasants' Party (PNȚ-CD) in 2002 and People's Action (AP), of which he was vice president, in 2003. He rejoined the PNL in 2005, serving as secretary general in 2006–2007, as well as head of the Maramureș County chapter during that period. Recalled to government, he served as Agriculture Minister under Tăriceanu from April to October 2007. Prosecutors from the National Anticorruption Directorate (DNA) allege that businessman Gheorghe Ciorbă sent former Agriculture Minister Ioan Avram Mureșan to meet with Remeș and offer him €15,000, an Audi Q7, and products worth 1,500 lei: 100 L of palinka and 20 kg of pork offal sausage called caltaboși. In exchange, Remeș was to steer contracts to Ciorbă's businesses at public bids organised by his ministry. During its prime-time newscast, Romanian Television (TVR) broadcast a video featuring Remeş allegedly accepting the bribe, leading to an outcry and his resignation. In the aftermath, Tăriceanu, rather than focus on what Remeș did, criticised TVR for carrying out the minister's "public execution", presaging a wider debate on the legitimacy of the airing. Suspended from the PNL for a year, Remeş had criminal charges of influence peddling filed against him in June 2008. The following year, he announced his intention to sue DNA, TVR and the Presidency in order to find out who leaked the video that prompted his resignation, asserting that he was the victim of a political order for his elimination. In February 2012, he and Mureșan were both sentenced to three years' imprisonment, with Remeș ordered to pay restitution. He was freed in February 2014, and died six years later.

He was married to Steliana Remeș.

== See also ==
- List of corruption scandals in Romania
