= Anca Dragu =

Romanian economist and politician

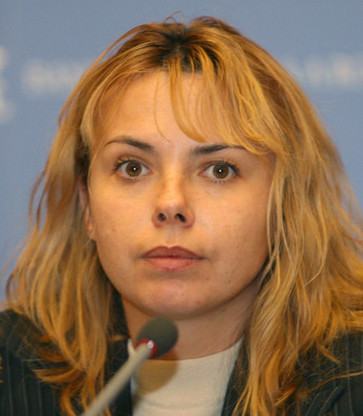
- Dragu in 2015

President of the Senate of Romania
- In office 21 December 2020 – 23 November 2021
- Preceded by: Robert Cazanciuc (acting)
- Succeeded by: Florin Cîțu

Member of the Senate of Romania
- In office 21 December 2020 – 29 December 2023
- Constituency: Bucharest

Minister of Public Finance
- In office 17 November 2015 – 4 January 2017
- Prime Minister: Dacian Cioloș
- Preceded by: Eugen Teodorovici
- Succeeded by: Viorel Ștefan

Governor of the National Bank of Moldova
- Incumbent
- Assumed office 22 December 2023
- Preceded by: Octavian Armașu

Personal details
- Born: 3 May 1972 (age 54)
- Citizenship: Romania; Moldova
- Party: PLUS (2018–2021); USR (2021–present)
- Education: Bucharest Academy of Economic Studies; National University of Political Studies and Public Administration
- Occupation: Economist, politician

Anca Dana Paliu Dragu (born 3 May 1972) is a Romanian economist and politician. She was Minister of Public Finance of Romania, as well as President of the Senate of Romania from 21 December 2020 to 23 November 2021. Dragu was the first woman in the history of the Senate to hold this position. In December 2023, she obtained Moldovan citizenship and was appointed Governor of the National Bank of Moldova.

== Biography ==
Anca Dana Paliu Dragu was born on 3 May 1972. She graduated from the Bucharest Academy of Economic Studies in 1996. From 1999 to 2000, she studied at Georgetown University in Washington, D.C., United States. She obtained an MA degree in public administration from the National University of Political Studies and Public Administration in Bucharest in 2007 and a PhD in economics from the Bucharest Academy of Economic Studies in 2010.

Between 1996 and 2001, Dragu was an economist for the National Bank of Romania before working for the International Monetary Fund in Bucharest. In 2013, she became an economist in the Directorate-General for Economic and Financial Affairs of the European Commission before becoming the European Investment Bank Governor for Romania as well as Minister of Public Finance of Romania in November 2015 as a technocrat, a position she held until January 2017.

Standing for election as a politician in the December 2020 Romanian parliamentary election, Dragu was elected to the Senate of Romania for the USR PLUS party. Selected as President of the Senate in December 2020 with the backing of the alliance between USR PLUS, PNL and UDMR, she kept this post until the alliance ended and was replaced in November 2021 by a PNL candidate. In 2021, USR PLUS became the Save Romania Union (USR) party.

On 22 December 2023, Dragu was appointed governor of the National Bank of Moldova (NBM), after Octavian Armașu had been dismissed the previous day. She was granted Moldovan citizenship. She resigned from her position, as senator on the same day, ending her mandate. The Senate officially registered her resignation on 29 December.

== See also ==
- List of ministers of finance of Romania

Political offices
Preceded by Eugen Teodorovici	Minister of Public Finance; 2015–2017	Succeeded by Viorel Ștefan
Preceded by Robert Cazanciuc; Acting	President of the Senate of Romania; 2020–2021	Succeeded by Florin Cîțu
Preceded by Octavian Armașu	Governor of the National Bank of Moldova; 2023–present	Incumbent
