= List of members of the European Parliament for Romania, 2007–2009 =

Members of the European Parliament for Romania
Observers	(2005)
Delegation	(2007)
6th term	(2007)
7th term	(2009)
8th term	(2014)
9th term	(2019)

This is a list of the 35 members of the European Parliament for Romania in the 2004 to 2009 session, replacing the members who were appointed by the Romanian Parliament.

== List ==
Name	National party	EP Group
Roberta Alma Anastase	Democratic Party (PD)	EPP–ED
Sebastian Valentin Bodu	Democratic Party (PD)	EPP–ED
Victor Boştinaru	Social Democratic Party (PSD)	PES
Nicodim Bulzesc	Democratic Party (PD)	EPP–ED
Cristian Buşoi	National Liberal Party (PNL)	ALDE
Titus Corlăţean	Social Democratic Party (PSD)	PES
Corina Creţu	Social Democratic Party (PSD)	PES
Gabriela Creţu	Social Democratic Party (PSD)	PES
Magor Csibi	National Liberal Party (PNL)	ALDE
Daniel Dăianu	National Liberal Party (PNL)	ALDE
Dragoş Florin David	Democratic Party (PD)	EPP–ED
Constantin Dumitriu	Democratic Party (PD)	EPP–ED
Petru Filip	Democratic Party (PD)	EPP–ED
Sorin Frunzăverde	Democratic Party (PD)	EPP–ED
Monica Iacob Ridzi	Democratic Party (PD)	EPP–ED
Ramona Mănescu	National Liberal Party (PNL)	ALDE
Marian-Jean Marinescu	Democratic Party (PD)	EPP–ED
Cătălin Ioan Nechifor	Social Democratic Party (PSD)	PES
Rareş Lucian Niculescu	Democratic Party (PD)	EPP–ED
Dumitru Oprea	Liberal Democratic Party	EPP–ED
Ioan Mircea Paşcu	Social Democratic Party (PSD)	PES
Maria Petre	Democratic Party (PD)	EPP–ED
Rovana Plumb	Social Democratic Party (PSD)	PES
Mihaela Popa	Liberal Democratic Party (PD)	EPP–ED
Nicolae-Vlad Popa	Liberal Democratic Party	EPP–ED
Daciana Octavia Sârbu	Social Democratic Party (PSD)	PES
Adrian Severin	Social Democratic Party (PSD)	PES
Csaba Sógor	Democratic Alliance of Hungarians in Romania (UDMR)	EPP–ED
Theodor Stolojan	Liberal Democratic Party	EPP–ED
Silvia Adriana Ţicău	Social Democratic Party (PSD)	PES
László Tőkés	Independent	G–EFA
Adina Ioana Vălean	National Liberal Party (PNL)	ALDE
Renate Weber	National Liberal Party (PNL)	ALDE
Gyula Winkler	Democratic Alliance of Hungarians in Romania (UDMR)	EPP–ED
Marian Zlotea	Democratic Party (PD)	EPP–ED
