= Viorel Ștefan =

Romanian politician (born 1954)

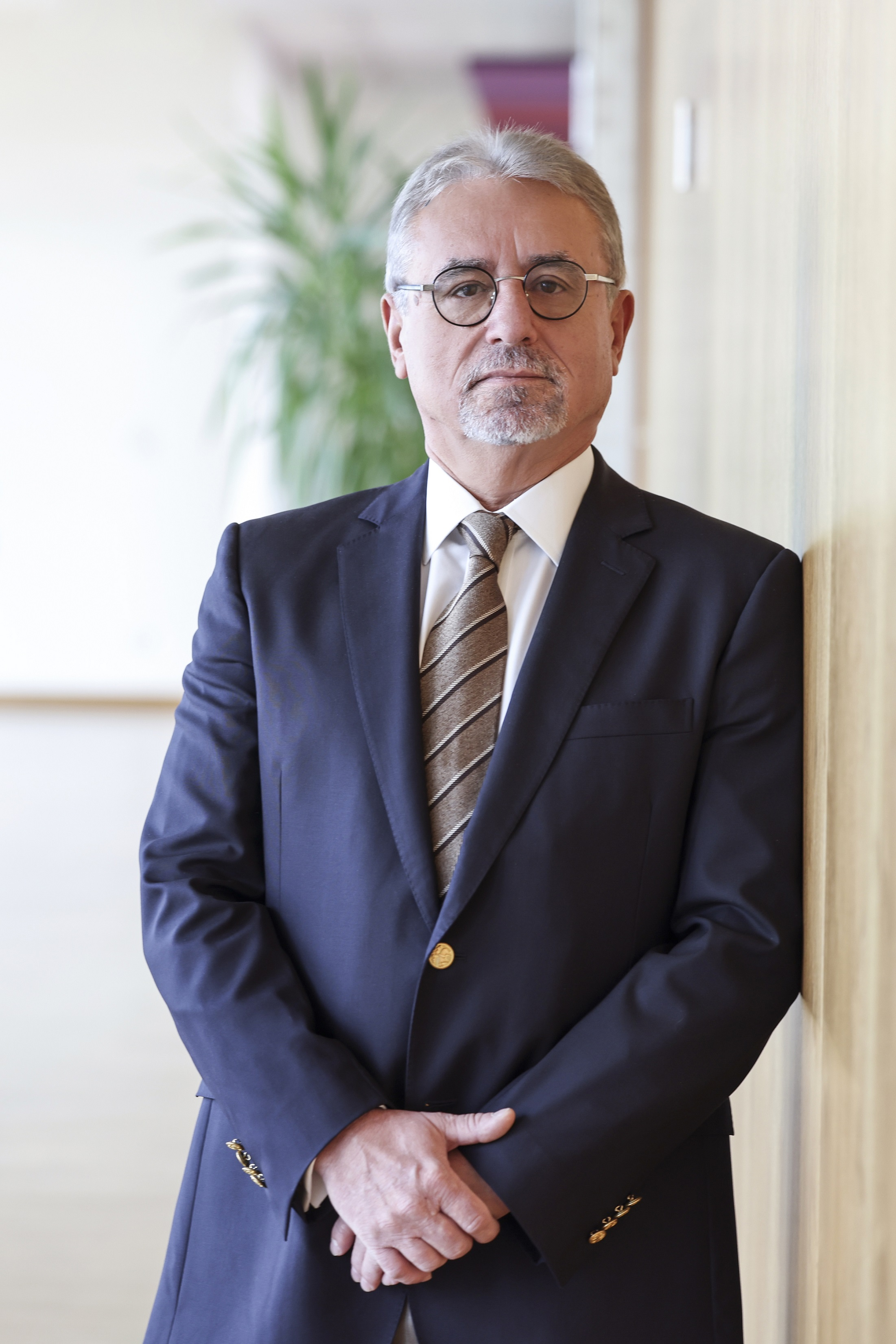
- Official portrait, 2023

Member of the European Court of Auditors for Romania
- In office 1 July 2019 – 30 June 2025
- President: Klaus-Heiner Lehne; Tony Murphy
- Preceded by: George Pufan
- Succeeded by: Lucian Romașcanu

Deputy Prime Minister of Romania
- In office 29 January 2018 – 3 July 2019
- President: Klaus Iohannis
- Prime Minister: Viorica Dăncilă
- Preceded by: Marcel Ciolacu
- Succeeded by: Eugen Teodorovici (acting)

Minister of Public Finance
- In office 4 January 2017 – 29 June 2017
- Prime Minister: Sorin Grindeanu
- Preceded by: Anca Dragu
- Succeeded by: Ionuţ Misa

Personal details
- Born: 24 July 1954 (age 71) Mitoc, Romania
- Party: PSD
- Children: 3

Viorel Ștefan (born 26 July 1954) is a Romanian politician and economist who served as a Member of the European Court of Auditors for Romania from 2019 to 2025. He previously served as Deputy Prime Minister of Romania from 2018 to 2019 and as Minister of Public Finance from January to June 2017.

== Education and career ==
Ștefan graduated in economics from the Alexandru Ioan Cuza University in 1980. He later worked as an accountant at the state company for river navigation, the NAVROM in Galați. After the 1989 revolution, he was appointed the general manager of NAVROM SA and became its president in 1996. He stopped working in 2002, while he was a senator. He was also a shareholder of Transport Trade Services.

== Political career ==
=== Parliamentary ===
A member of the PSDR since 1993, he was elected to the Senate in 1996 and was reelected in 2000 and 2004. He was Chairman of the Budget and Finance commission during his tenure as a Senator.

After serving three terms in the Senate, he was elected to the Chamber of Deputies in 2008. He was reelected to the constituency of Galați in both 2012 and 2016. In March 2015, he was linked to become the next Finance Minister in order to replace Darius Vâlcov but Prime Minister Victor Ponta chose Eugen Teodorovici instead.

Ștefan was elected as one of the 14 Vice Presidents of the PSD in October 2015 following the election of Liviu Dragnea as the party President.

=== Minister of Finance ===
Ștefan was appointed the Minister of Finance in the Grindeanu government in January 2017. He was not reappointed to the Tudose government in June of the same year.

=== Deputy Prime Minister ===
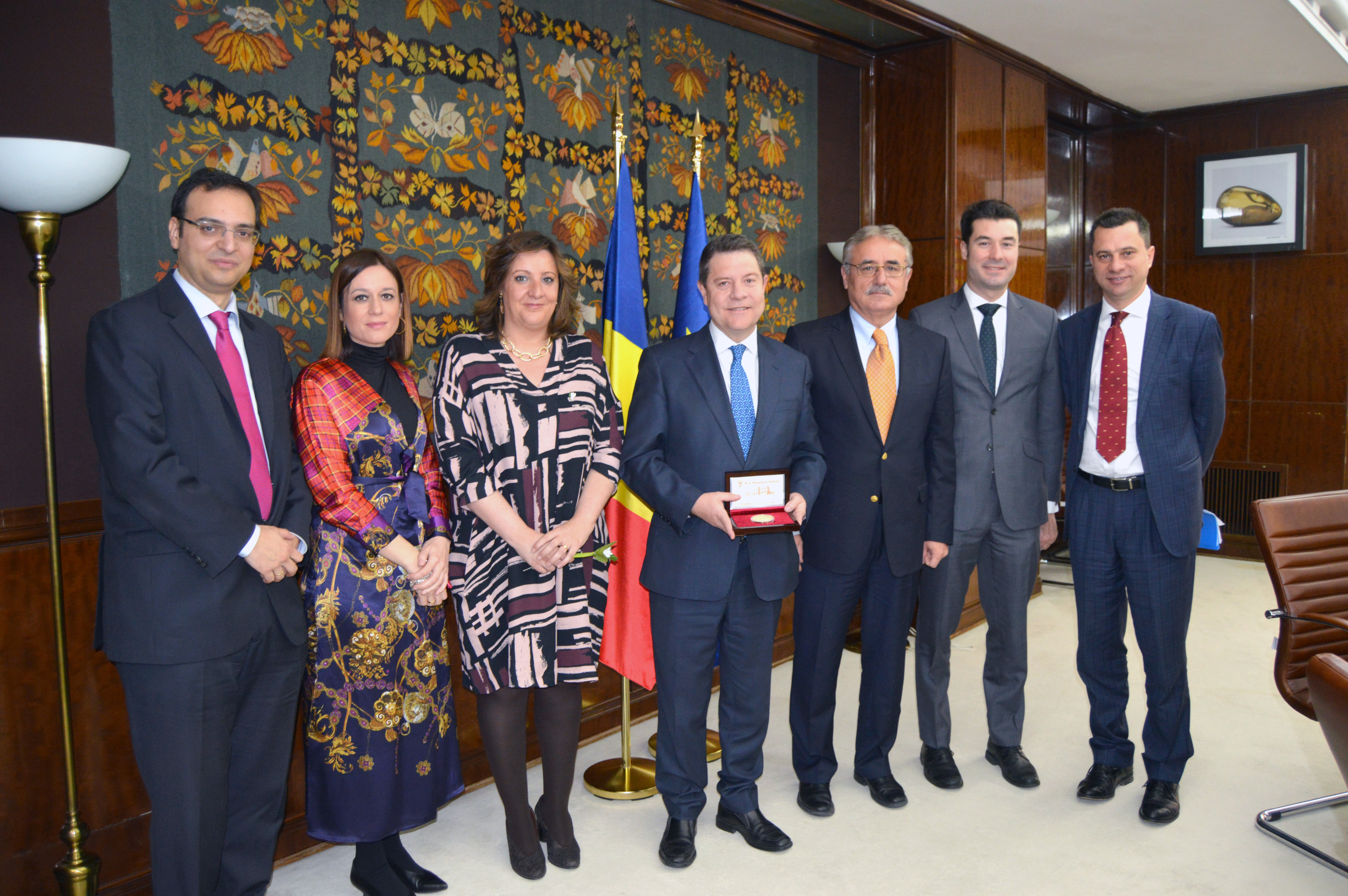
Ștefan with Emiliano García-Page in the Victoria Palace on 1 March 2019

He was appointed Deputy Prime Minister of Romania on 29 January 2018 and held the position until 3 July 2019 under Prime Minister Viorica Dăncilă.

=== European Court of Auditors ===
In 2019, he was proposed to become a member of the European Court of Auditors. He took office on 1 July, and will serve until 30 June 2025.

== Personal life ==
Ștefan is married with 3 children. He was bestowed the National Order for Merit in the rank of Knight.
