= Marcel Boloș =

Romanian politician (born 1968)

Marcel Boloș PhD

Minister of European Investments and Projects
- In office 23 December 2024 – 23 June 2025
- President: Klaus Iohannis; Ilie Bolojan (acting); Nicușor Dan
- Prime Minister: Marcel Ciolacu; Cătălin Predoiu (acting)
- Preceded by: Adrian Câciu
- Succeeded by: Dragoș Pîslaru
- In office 3 May 2022 – 15 June 2023
- President: Klaus Iohannis
- Prime Minister: Nicolae Ciucă
- Preceded by: Dan Vîlceanu
- Succeeded by: Adrian Câciu
- In office 4 November 2019 – 23 December 2020
- President: Klaus Iohannis
- Prime Minister: Ludovic Orban
- Preceded by: Roxana Mînzatu
- Succeeded by: Cristian Ghinea

Minister of Finance
- In office 15 June 2023 – 23 December 2024
- President: Klaus Iohannis
- Prime Minister: Marcel Ciolacu
- Preceded by: Adrian Câciu
- Succeeded by: Barna Tánczos

Minister of Research, Innovation and Digitalisation
- In office 28 January 2022 – 3 May 2022
- President: Klaus Iohannis
- Prime Minister: Nicolae Ciucă
- Preceded by: Florin Roman
- Succeeded by: Sebastian Burduja

Personal details
- Born: 1 April 1968 (age 58) Poieni, Cluj, Romania
- Party: PNL
- Education: University of Oradea

Marcel-Ioan Boloș (Note: Romanian pronunciation: [marˈt͡ʃel iˈo̯an ˈboloʃ]) (born 1 April 1968) is a Romanian economist and politician who has served as Minister of European Investments and Projects from 23 December 2024 until 23 June 2025. He had previously held the same position twice, once under Prime Minister Ludovic Orban (2019–2020) and once under Prime Minister Nicolae Ciuca (2022–2023). Between June 2023 and December 2024, he served as Minister of Finance under Prime Minister Marcel Ciolacu's first cabinet.

== Early life and education ==
Boloș was born on 1 April 1968 in Poieni, Cluj in Romania. From 1982 to 1986, he studied at Huedin Industrial High School where he received a Baccalaureate diploma. From 1993 to 1997, he studied at the Bachelor Programme of Economic Sciences in University of Oradea where he obtained a bachelor's degree as an economist specialised in insurance finance. From 1992 to 1997, he studied at the Bachelor Programme of Electrical Engineering and Informatics as an Engineer specialised in electromechanics earning a bachelor's degree. From 1997 to 1999, he studied at the University of Oradea where he received a Diploma of Advanced Studies, specialising in the Management of Banking Financial Institutions.

From 2000 to 2005, he studied at the West University of Timişoara at the Programme of Economic Sciences where he obtained a PhD in accounting.

== Career ==
=== Teaching ===
From 1999 to 2001, Marcel Boloș was a teaching assistant at the Programme of Economic Sciences at the University of Oradea.Between 2001 and 2008 he worked as a university lecturer at the department of Finance and Accounting . From 2008 to 2015, he was an associate professor and in 2015 became a university professor at the same department. In June 2017, he obtained the qualification certificate in the field of finance, at the Bucharest Academy of Economic Studies.

=== 1993-2019 ===
Boloș became inspector in the Public Relations Service at Oradea City in 1993 and remained in the position until 1997. He became head of office in 1997 and served until 1998. He served as the chief accountant at the Real Estate Department from 1998 to 2000 and then economic director within the real estate administration at Oradea Local Council from 2005 to 2008. He became executive director at the Internationally Funded Projects Management Directorate at Oradea City Hall in 2008 serving until 2012.

From 2012 to 2013, he served as State Secretary at the Ministry of Regional Development and Tourism and from 2013 until November 2015 he was the Director General, Coordinator of the POST Managing Authority and of the General Directorate for Management and Strategies. From November 2015 to January 2017, he was State Secretary at the Ministry of Transport. From January 2017 to November 2019, he was Director General at ADR Nord Vest.

=== Ministerial career (2019-2023) ===
Boloș served as Minister of European Projects and Investment from 4 November 2019 to 23 December 2020 in the successive first and second Orban cabinets. On 14 December 2021, he was appointed honorary advisor to Prime Minister Nicolae Ciucă in the field of Finance, budget and European Funds.

On 28 January 2022, Boloș was appointed Minister of Research, Innovation and Digitalisation. He was formally sworn in as Minister at the Cotroceni Presidential Palace before President Klaus Iohannis with Florin Cîțu, Marcel Ciolacu and Nicolae Ciucă amongst those in attendance. He was formally dismissed from the position after being appointed Minister of European Projects and Investment on 3 May.

=== Finance Minister (2023-2024) ===
Boloș was appointed Minister of Finance on 15 June 2023 as part of the First Ciolacu Cabinet, following a successful vote of confidence in Parliament, where the cabinet received the support of 290 senators and deputies. Prior to his appointment, Boloș received a favourable recommendation from the Parliamentary Committee for Budget and Finance, securing 30 votes in favour of his nomination. His term as Minister of Finance ended on 23 December 2024, when he resumed his role as Minister of European Investments and Projects in the Second Ciolacu Cabinet.

== Other activities ==
- International Monetary Fund (IMF), Ex-Officio Alternate Member of the Board of Governors (since 2023)
