= Florea Dumitrescu =

Romanian economist and diplomat (1927–2018)

Governor of the National Bank of Romania
- In office March 17, 1984 – March 17, 1989
- Preceded by: Vasile Răuță
- Succeeded by: Decebal Urdea

Ambassador of Romania to China
- In office July 6, 1978 – April 15, 1983
- Preceded by: Nicolae Gavrilescu
- Succeeded by: Angelo Miculescu

Ambassador of Romania to Burma
- In office May 7, 1979 – Mar 9, 1987

Minister of Finance of Romania
- In office August 19, 1969 – March 7, 1978
- Preceded by: Virgil Pârvu
- Succeeded by: Paul Niculescu-Mizil

Personal details
- Born: April 4, 1927 Necșești, Teleorman County, Kingdom of Romania
- Died: April 16, 2018 (aged 91) Bucharest, Romania
- Party: Romanian Communist Party
- Education: Bucharest Academy of Economic Studies

Florea Dumitrescu (April 4, 1927 – April 16, 2018) was a Romanian economist and diplomat. Dumitrescu held the positions of Minister of Finance of Romania from 1969 to 1978 and Governor of the National Bank of Romania from 1984 until 1989 under President Nicolae Ceaușescu during the country's Communist era. He served as Ambassador of Romania to China from 1978 to 1983.

In parallel, he also served as Ambassador of Romania to Myanmar from 1979 to 1987.

Dumitrescu, the son of farmers, wanted to become an economist and financier to escape the rural poverty in which he was raised. He graduated from the Bucharest Academy of Economic Studies in 1949.

He was appointed Governor of the National Bank of Romania from 1984 until his dismissal by Ceaușescu in March 1989.

Dumitrescu died at his home in Bucharest on April 16, 2018, at the age of 91.
