= Săulescu =

Săulescu is a Romanian surname. Notable people with the surname include:

- Mihai Săulescu (1861–1929), Romanian jurist and politician
- Mihail Săulescu (1888–1916), Romanian poet and playwright
- Nicolae N. Săulescu (born 1939), Romanian agronomist
