= Theodor Stolojan =

Romanian politician

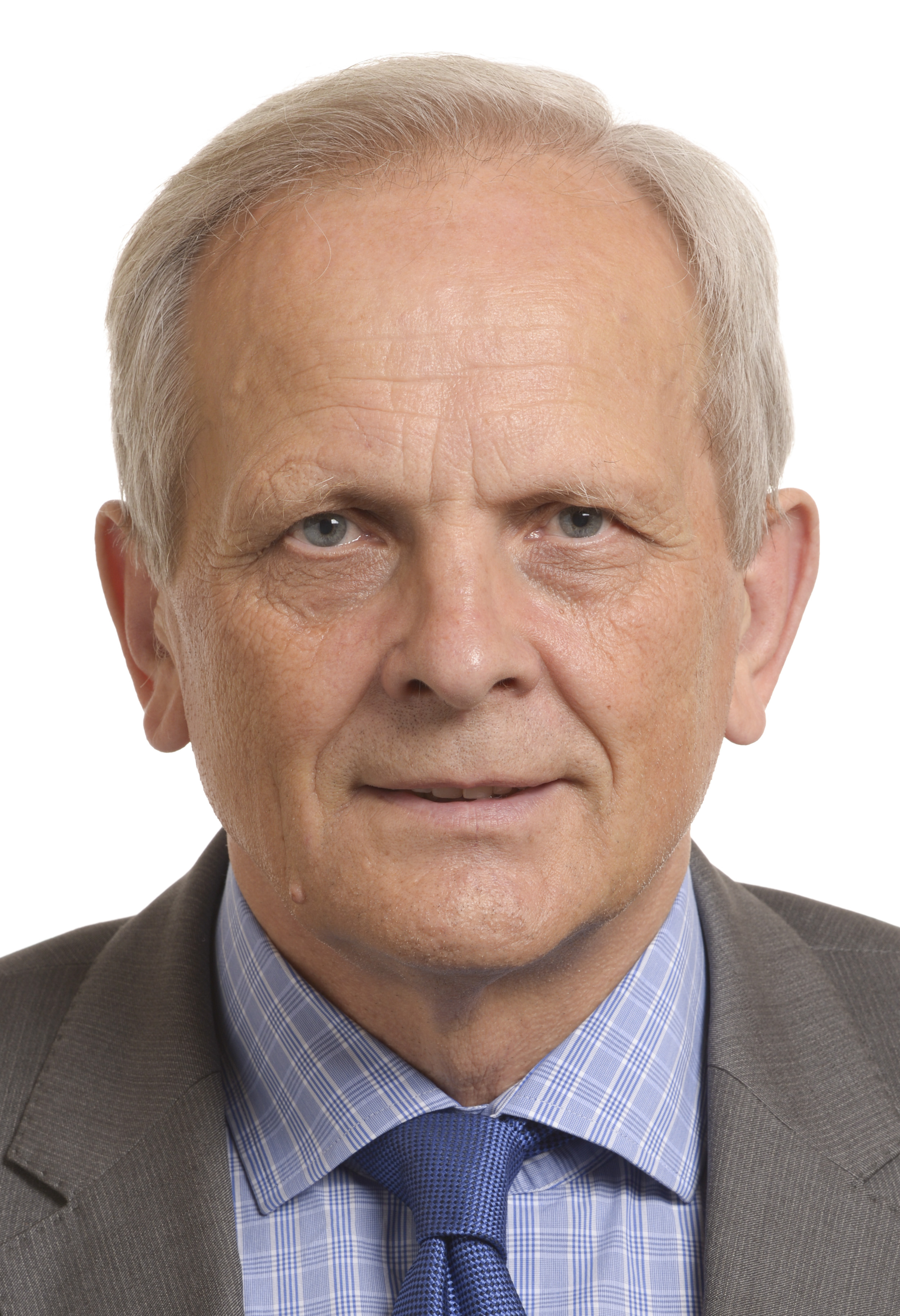

Prime Minister of Romania
- In office 1 October 1991 – 19 November 1992
- President: Ion Iliescu
- Preceded by: Petre Roman
- Succeeded by: Nicolae Văcăroiu

Member of the European Parliament for Romania
- In office 10 December 2007 – 1 July 2019

Minister of Public Finance
- In office 28 June 1990 – 30 April 1991
- Prime Minister: Petre Roman
- Preceded by: Ion Pățan
- Succeeded by: Eugen Dijmărescu

Leader of the National Liberal Party
- In office 24 August 2002 – 2 October 2004
- Preceded by: Valeriu Stoica
- Succeeded by: Călin Popescu-Tăriceanu

Leader of the Liberal Democratic Party
- In office 31 March 2007 – 15 December 2007
- Succeeded by: Emil Boc (merged into the Democratic Liberal Party)

Personal details
- Born: 24 October 1943 (age 83) Târgoviște, Romania
- Party: National Liberal Party (2000–2006; 2014–present); European People's Party (2007–present)
- Other political affiliations: Romanian Communist Party (before 1989); Independent (1989–2000); Liberal Democratic Party (2006–2007); Democratic Liberal Party (2007–2014)
- Spouse: Elena Stolojan
- Education: Bucharest Academy of Economic Studies (ASE)
- Profession: Economist

Theodor Dumitru Stolojan (Romanian pronunciation: [teˈodor stoloˈʒan]; born 24 October 1943) is a Romanian politician who was Prime Minister of Romania from October 1991 to November 1992. An economist by training, he was also one of the presidents of the National Liberal Party (PNL) before being the founding leader of the Liberal Democratic Party (PLD) and then the Democratic Liberal Party (PDL). He was a Member of the European Parliament for Romania, representing the Democratic Liberal Party (PDL) and then the National Liberal Party (PNL; both EPP-ED-affiliated). He was also professor at the Transilvania University of Brașov between 2002 and 2012.

== Career ==
Before the Romanian Revolution, Stolojan worked at the Committee for State Planning, together with Nicolae Văcăroiu, who subsequently became President of the Senate between 20 December 2000 and 14 October 2008.

During the rule of Nicolae Ceaușescu, he worked at the Ministry of Finances between 1972 and 1977 as an economist in the State Budget Department, then between 1978 and 1982 as Chief of Accountancy of State Budget and then as deputy director of the Department for Foreign Exchange and International Financial Relations until the Romanian Revolution.

He was the Prime minister of Romania from September 1991 to November 1992, then worked for the World Bank and for a Romanian private company. In 1992, the Stolojan government began an austerity plan, limiting wages and further liberalising prices. The economic situation deteriorated and inflation as well as unemployment increased substantially. After his term ended, he worked at the World Bank.

In 2000, he re-entered politics as a member of the National Liberal Party (PNL); he ran for the presidency of Romania in the November 2000 elections, but came in third, behind Ion Iliescu and Corneliu Vadim Tudor. He was named president of the PNL in August 2002.

In 2003, his party approached the Democratic Party leader Traian Băsescu, at that time the mayor of Bucharest, and initiated an alliance named "D.A. - Dreptate şi Adevăr" (Justice and Truth Alliance). In February 2004, he was chosen as the alliance's candidate in the Romanian presidential election of November 2004.

On 2 October 2004, Stolojan surprisingly stepped down from the leadership of the PNL and also withdrew from the presidential race. He cited serious health problems as a reason for his decision. Stolojan became a senior advisor to Băsescu after the latter was inaugurated as president on 20 December 2004.

On 10 October 2006, Stolojan was expelled from the PNL, and in December he formed a new party, the Liberal Democrats (PLD), whose president he was elected at the first PLD congress on 31 March 2007. In January 2008, the PLD merged with the Democratic Party to form the Democratic Liberal Party (PDL), of which Stolojan was then a member.

The PDL won the most seats in the 2008 election, and on 10 December 2008, Stolojan was designated prime minister of Romania by President Traian Băsescu. Five days later, he withdrew his acceptance, saying he was stepping down in favour of a younger candidate; Emil Boc was then selected.

== Personal life ==
He and his wife Elena have a son, Vlad Stolojan, and a daughter, Ada Palea.

== Electoral history ==
=== Presidential elections ===
Election	Affiliation	First round			Second round		
Election	Affiliation	Votes	Percentage	Position	Votes	Percentage	Position
2000	PNL	1,321,420	11.8%	3rd	not qualified		

Political offices
Preceded by Ion Pățan	Minister of Finance; 1990–1991	Succeeded by Eugen Dijmărescu
Preceded by Petre Roman	Prime Minister of Romania; 1991–1992	Succeeded by Nicolae Văcăroiu
Party political offices
Preceded by Valeriu Stoica	President of the National Liberal Party; 2002–2004	Succeeded by Călin Popescu-Tăriceanu
New political party	President of the Liberal Democratic Party; 2006–2008	Party dissolved
