= Roxana Mînzatu =

Romanian politician (born 1980)

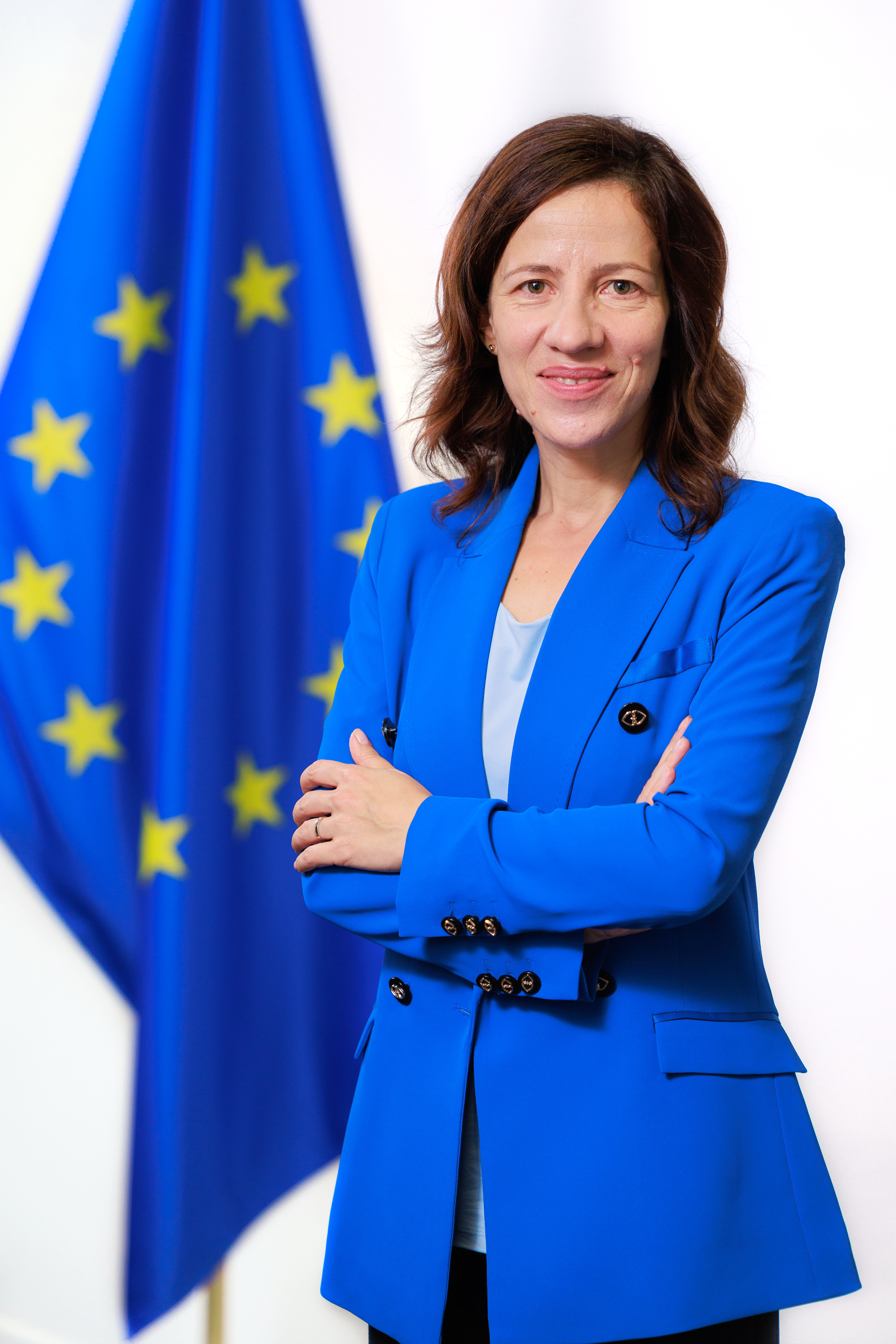
- Official portrait, 2024

Executive Vice-President for Social Rights and Skills, Quality Jobs and Preparedness
- Incumbent
- Assumed office 1 December 2024
- Commission: Von der Leyen II
- Preceded by: Nicolas Schmit

Member of the European Parliament for Romania
- In office 16 July 2024 – 30 November 2024
- Succeeded by: Andi Cristea

Secretary of State for Programs Financed by Public and European Funds
- In office 3 May 2022 – 15 July 2024
- Prime Minister: Nicolae Ciucă; Marcel Ciolacu
- Minister: Marcel Boloș; Adrian Câciu

Minister of European Funds
- In office 7 June 2019 – 4 November 2019
- Prime Minister: Viorica Dăncilă
- Preceded by: Rovana Plumb
- Succeeded by: Marcel Boloș

Member of the Chamber of Deputies
- In office 20 December 2016 – 6 December 2020
- Constituency: Brașov County

Personal details
- Born: 1 April 1980 (age 46) Brașov, Romania
- Party: Social Democratic Party (2000–present)
- Education: University of Bucharest
- Occupation: Political scientist • Politician

Roxana Mînzatu (Romanian pronunciation: [roˈksana mɨnˈzatu]; born 1 April 1980) is a Romanian politician, local government official and manager of European Union projects in Romania. In 2016, she was elected to the Romanian Chamber of Deputies and in 2019, was appointed as Minister of European Funds. In 2024 she was elected as a Member of the European Parliament. Since December 2024 she serves as Vice-President of the European Commission and Commissioner for Social Rights and Skills, Quality Jobs and Preparedness under the Second Von der Leyen Commission.

== Early life and education ==
Mînzatu was born on 1 April 1980 in Brașov. She obtained a BA in political science in 2002 from the University of Bucharest and an MA in European integration in 2005, from the Dimitrie Cantemir Christian University. From 2004 to 2006, she was employed at the Ministry of European Integration. She later worked as a manager and consultant for several projects, particularly those financed by the European Union. Her activities also included running a non-profit business school.

== Political career ==
Mînzatu became involved in local political activities within the Social Democratic Party (PSD). She was a member of the Brasov district council (2004–2008, 2011–2012, 2016). In 2015, she was appointed Secretary of State at the Ministry of European Funds, and then headed the National Agency for Public Procurement (ANAP).

In 2016, Mînzatu was elected to the Romanian Chamber of Deputies, where she became secretary of the Committee for Industries and Services and a member of the Committee for European Affairs. In June 2019 she was appointed as Minister for European Funds in the government of Viorica Dăncilă, with the particular aim of accelerating development in key sectors, such as water and waste water infrastructure and digitalization. However, the government was ousted in October of the same year following a vote of no confidence. She was not a candidate in the 2020 national election and returned to business activities until she was elected in the 2024 European Parliament elections, when her party formed an alliance with the National Liberal Party (PNL). In the parliament she became part of the Progressive Alliance of Socialists and Democrats grouping and a member of the Committee on Regional Development.
