= Daniel Dăianu =

Romanian politician and economist

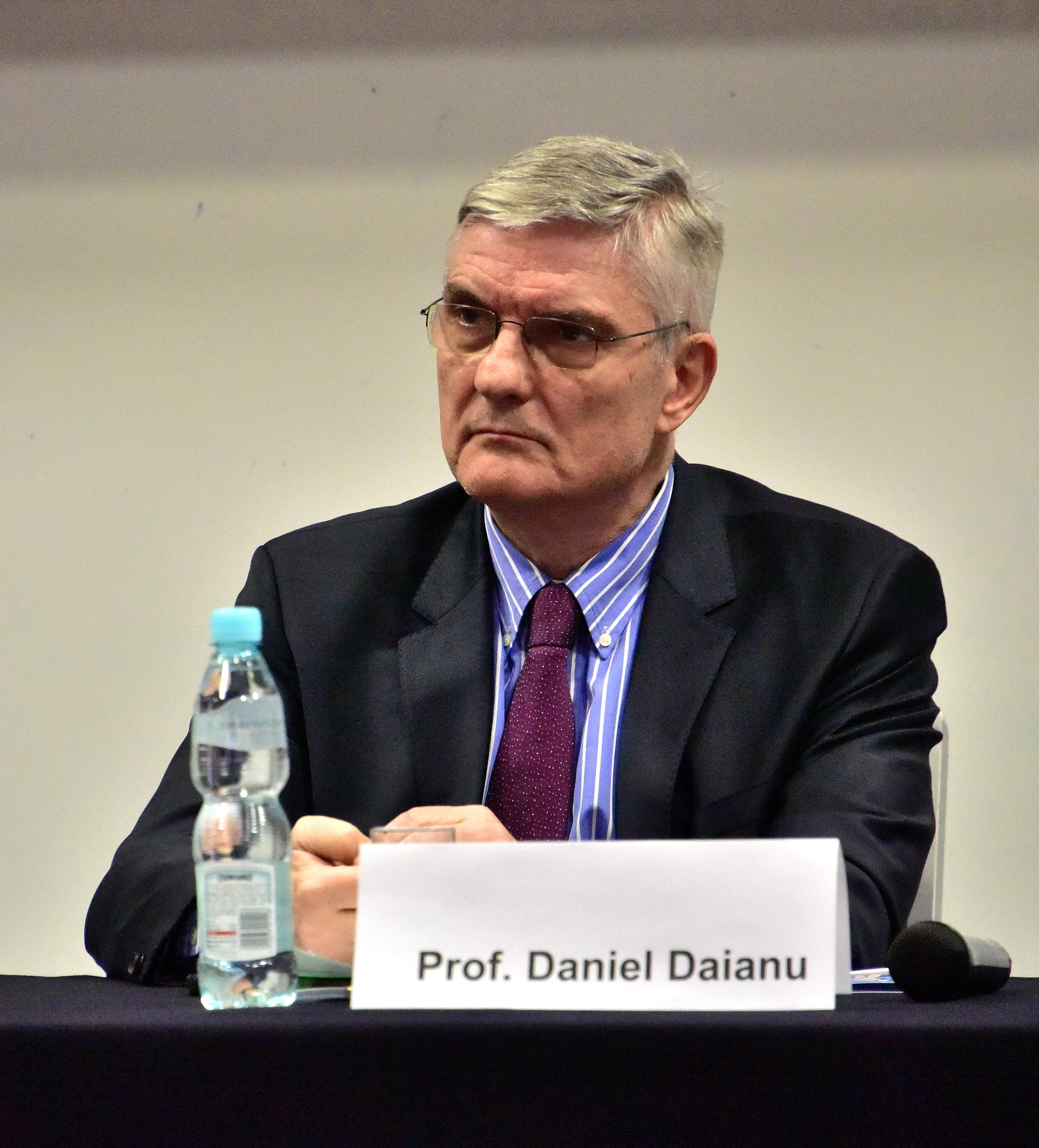

Minister of Finance
- In office 5 December 1997 – 23 September 1998
- Prime Minister: Victor Ciorbea; Radu Vasile
- Preceded by: Mircea Ciumara
- Succeeded by: Decebal Traian Remeș

Member of the European Parliament for Romania
- In office 10 December 2007 – 13 July 2009

Personal details
- Born: 30 August 1952 (age 74) Bucharest, Romania
- Party: National Liberal Party (PNL)
- Education: Academy of Economic Studies (ASE)
- Occupation: Economist, professor

Daniel Dăianu (born 30 August 1952) is a Romanian economist, professor and politician.

== Early life ==
He was born in Bucharest, Romania in a family of high-ranking Securitate officers. Up to 9th grade he studied at High School nr. 35, after which he switched to the Ion Luca Caragiale High School, where he attended a special math class from 1968 to 1971. In 1975, he obtained a Master of Economics from the Academy of Economic Studies (ASE) in Bucharest and, in 1988, a Ph.D. in Economics from the same institution. He held a post-doctoral research position at Harvard University's Russian Research Center, from 1990 to 1991 and attended Harvard Business School's six-week Advanced Management Program in 1994.

During Nicolae Ceaușescu's communist regime, Dăianu worked for the Securitate's Foreign Intelligence Unit (DIE), between 1976 and September 1978. He left DIE in 1978, of his own volition and he became known, in the following decade, for his writings against Ceaușescu's economic policy, which were highlighted on Radio Free Europe (RFE) at the time. Between 1979 and 1990, he was a researcher at the Economic Socialist Institute. In September 2007, the National Council for Analyzing the State Security Department Files (CNSAS) decided that Dăianu had worked for the External Intelligence Unit solely on economic issues.

== Public service career ==
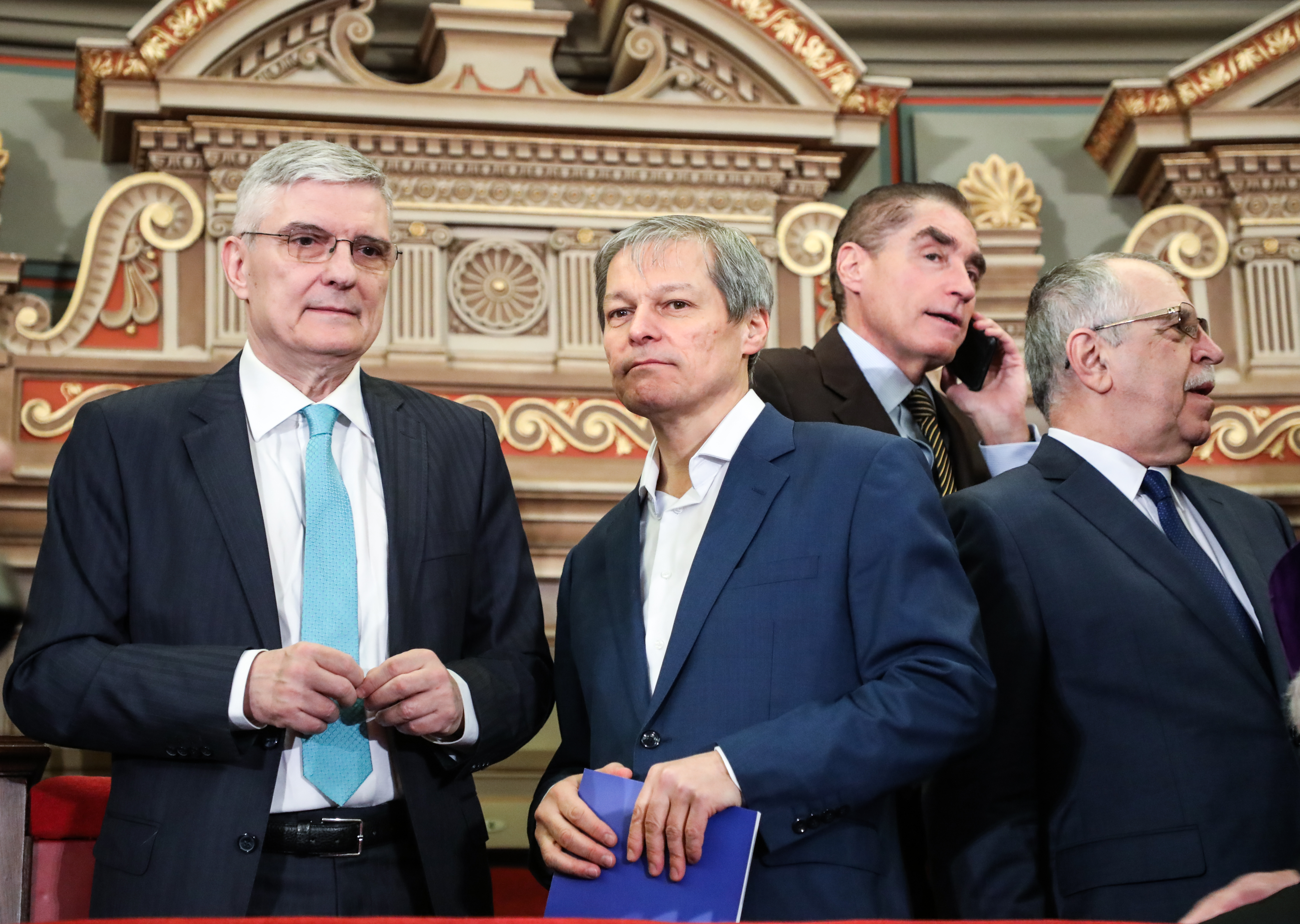
Dăianu with Dacian Cioloș and Petre Roman in 2019

Between 1992 and 1997, Dăianu was the Chief Economist of the National Bank of Romania. He was the Finance Minister of Romania between December 5, 1997, and September 23, 1998, in the governments of Victor Ciorbea and Radu Vasile. He was dismissed because he refused to endorse a controversial deal with Bell Helicopter Textron to purchase 96 AH-1RO Dracula attack helicopters (a variant of AH-1 Cobra), in order to help modernize the armed forces. Dăianu considered that terms of the contract were disadvantageous for the Romanian industry and that the deal was too costly for the Romanian budget at that time.

In August 2005, he became President of the Supervision Board of Banca Comercială Română, a position previously held by Sebastian Vlădescu and Florin Georgescu, among others. He resigned this post in December 2007, in order to avoid any conflict of interest with his duties as a member of the European Parliament. During 2012–13 he was a member of the Board of CEC Bank. Dăianu was also the President of the European Association for Comparative Economic Studies (EACES), between 2002 and 2004.

He was a member of the European Parliament between 2007 and 2009, when he represented the National Liberal Party (PNL). He was co-rapporteur of the report "Lamfalussy follow-up: Future Structure of Supervision", for the European Parliament. On May 22, 2008, Dăianu, together with three former Presidents of the European Commission, nine former Prime Ministers of EU member states, and six former Finance/Economy Ministers, co-signed an article with title "Financial Markets Cannot Govern Us" in "Le Monde", in which they anticipated the extent of the economic crisis and talked about its causes. In October 2008, Dăianu took position against European banks that receive state aids to get out of the crisis, yet damage emerging European economies through speculation against national currencies.

During the presidential elections of 2009, he was touted as one of possible prime ministers. In 2010, Dăianu was invited to be a fellow of the Warsaw-based Center for Social and Economic Research (CASE). Between 2014 - 2019, he was a member of the Board of the National Bank of Romania. Between April 2013 and June 2014, he was first deputy president of the Romanian Financial Supervision Authority. He is the president of the Romanian Fiscal Council since 2019. Daniel Dăianu is a member of the High Level Group on Own Resources of the European Union, which is headed by Mario Monti. Dăianu is also a member of the European Council for Foreign Relations, since 2012.

== Academic career ==
Dăianu is a professor of public finance at the National University of Political Studies and Public Administration in Bucharest. During different periods, he held research positions at the Woodrow Wilson International Center for Scholars in Washington, D.C., the NATO Defense College in Rome, the International Monetary Fund, and the Organisation for Economic Co-operation and Development in Paris. Between 1999 and 2004, he was a professor at the Academy of Economic Studies in Bucharest, at the University of California, Berkeley, at the University of California, Los Angeles, and at the University of Bologna.

Dăianu was elected corresponding member of the Romanian Academy in 2001, and became titular member in 2013. In 2023, he was elected a member of the Academia Europaea. He has written several books and his columns have appeared in Ziarul Financiar, Piața Financiară, Bursa, Southeast European Times, European Voice, Les Echos, Europe's World, and World Commerce Review.

He speaks Romanian (mother tongue), English, French, German, Italian and Spanish.

== Selected writings ==
- Funcționarea economiei și echilibrul extern (Editura Academiei Române, 1992), ISBN 973-27-0289-3
- Economic vitality and viability: a dual challenge for European Security. Frankfurt am Main: Peter Lang. June 1996. ISBN 0-8204-3184-2. OCLC 34771975.
- Transformation of Economy As a Real Process: An Insider's Perspective (Ashgate Publishing, April 1999), ISBN 1-84014-475-0
- Balkan reconstruction, by Daniel Dăianu and Thanos Veremes (Frank Cass, January 2001) ISBN 0-7146-5148-6, ISBN 0-7146-8172-5
- Ethical Boundaries of Capitalism, by Daniel Dăianu and Radu Vrânceanu (Ashgate Publishing, June 2005), ISBN 0-7546-4395-6
- Frontierele etice ale capitalismului, translated into Romanian by Dorin Nistor, Alina Pelea, Marius Gulei (Polirom, 2006) ISBN 973-46-0085-0
- Pariul României. Economia noastră: reformă și integrare, (Bucharest, Compania, 2006), ISBN 973-8119-95-2
- Ce vom fi în Uniune, (Iași, Polirom, 2006), ISBN 973-46-0269-1
- South East Europe and The World We Live In (Bucharest, The Romanian Diplomatic Institute, 2008), ISBN 978-973-27-1628-1
- The Macroeconomics of EU Integration. The Case of Romania (Bucharest, Rosetti Educational, 2008), ISBN 978-973-7881-34-2
- Which Way Goes Capitalism? (Budapest/New York, Central European University Press, May 2009), ISBN 978-963-9776-47-0
- Lupta cu criza financiară. Eforturile unui membru român al PE / Combating the Financial Crisis. A Romanian MEPs Struggle, Bucharest, Rosetti Educațional, 2009, ISBN 978-973-7881-52-6
- Co-author of Whither Economic Growth in Central and Eastern Europe, Bruegel Blueprint Series, Brussels, 2010, ISBN 978-90-78910-17-6
- EU Economic Governance Reform: Are We at a Turning Point?, RCEP Policy Brief No.17, 2010
- Co-edited volume "The Crisis of the Eurozone. The Future of Europe", Palgrave Macmillan, 2014 (Dăianu, Basevi, D'Adda, and Kumar)
- Băncile centrale, criză și post-criză, Polirom, 2018
- Emerging Europe and the Great Recession, Cambridge Scholars Publishing, UK, 2018
- Economia și pandemia. Ce urmează?, Polirom, 2021
- Crizele și tentația autoritaristă, Polirom, 2025
