= National Agency for Fiscal Administration =

Revenue service of the Romanian government

- (ANAF)
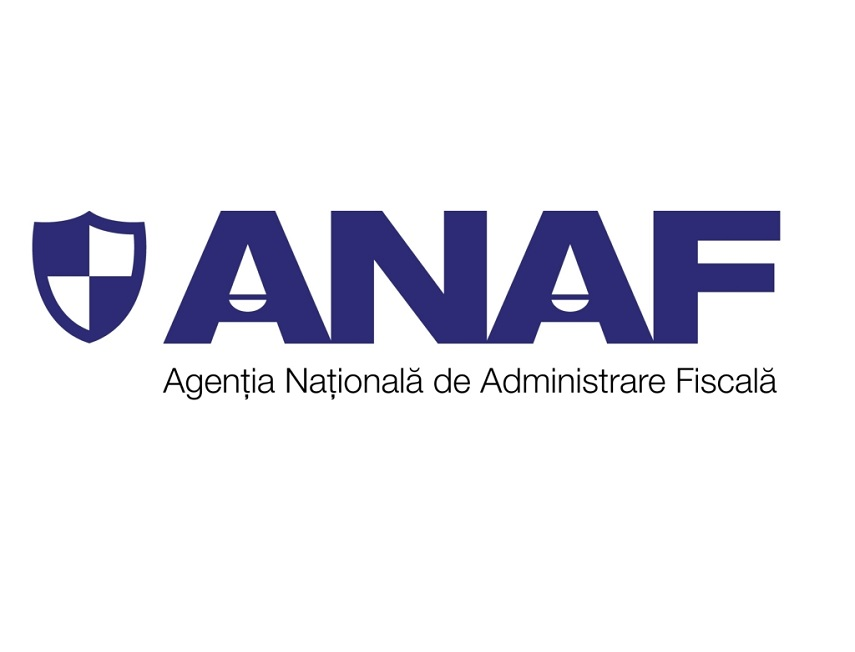
- Logo of National Agency for Fiscal Administration

Agency overview
- Formed: 1 October 2003
- Jurisdiction: România
- Headquarters: Str. Apolodor no. 17, Sector 5, Bucharest - 050741
- Minister responsible: Alexandru Nazare
- Agency executives: President of the National Agency for Fiscal Administration, Adrian Nicușor Nica; Vice President of the National Agency for Fiscal Administration, Ionuț Aurică; Vice President of the National Agency for Fiscal Administration, Gabriela Florentina Ionescu; General Secretary of the National Agency for Fiscal Administration, Dragoș Ionuț Bănescu
- Parent agency: Ministry of Finance
- Website: https://www.anaf.ro

The National Agency for Fiscal Administration (Romanian: Agenția Națională de Administrare Fiscală, ANAF) is the revenue service of the Government of Romania.

ANAF was established on October 1, 2003, under the Ministry of Public Finance and became operational in January 2004.

In 2009, the total number of employees of the agency and its subordinate structures was 31,281. During that year, the tax authority carried out 29,000 inspections on individuals and 83,000 on companies, which added an additional 5.8 billion leu to the budget.

Romania is committed to improving its tax administration.
