= Adrian Câciu =

Romanian politician

Minister of Investments and European Projects
- In office 15 June 2023 – 23 December 2024
- Prime Minister: Marcel Ciolacu
- Preceded by: Marcel Boloș
- Succeeded by: Marcel Boloș

Minister of Finance
- In office 25 November 2021 – 15 June 2023
- Prime Minister: Nicolae Ciucă
- Preceded by: Dan Vîlceanu
- Succeeded by: Marcel Boloș

Personal details
- Born: 20 February 1974 (age 52)
- Party: Social Democratic Party
- Education: Bucharest Academy of Economic Studies
- Occupation: Economist and politician

Adrian Câciu (born 20 February 1974) is a Romanian economist and politician. Since 25 November 2021 he has been Minister of Finance in the Government of Nicolae Ciucă, and a member of the Social Democratic Party.

== Education ==
In 1997, he graduated in international relations and business from the Academy of Economic Studies in Bucharest. In 2011, he obtained a master's degree in managing rural development projects at the same university.

== Politics ==
He was director of the office of the Secretary of State and a member of the management committee of Agenția Domeniilor Statului, an agricultural real estate agency. In November 2021, on the recommendation of the Social Democratic Party, he became the minister of finance in the then-formed government headed by Nicolae Ciucă.
