= Ioan Donca =

Romanian diplomat (1940–2025)

Ioan Donca (14 March 1940 – 23 August 2025) was a Romanian diplomat.

== Life and career ==
Donca was born in Satu Mare on 14 March 1940. He worked with the Ministry of Foreign Affairs from 1965 to 2009. In 1993, he held the position of Ambassador of Romania to Hungary; from 1999 to 2002, he was Ambassador to China; and from 2005 to 2008, he was ambassador to Russia.

He was awarded the Order of Merit in the rank of Commander in 2000.

Donca died in Bucharest on 23 August 2025, at the age of 85.
