= Ion Strat =

Moldavian, later Romanian jurist and politician

Ion Strat (1836–October 20, 1879) was a Moldavian, later Romanian jurist and politician.

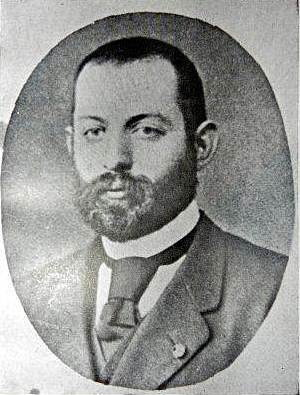
Romanian economist and politician Ioan Strat

Born in Roman, his secondary education took place under the auspices of a tutor from Heidelberg. Between 1855 and 1859, he studied law and public administration at the universities of Heidelberg and Berlin, obtaining a doctorate from the latter institution. Upon his return home, he became personal secretary to the Moldavian interior minister, Mihail Kogălniceanu. In 1860, he was appointed professor of political economy at the newly founded University of Iași. The first head of the political economy department at age 24, he soon became its first rector as well as its first law faculty dean. He served as rector until the following year and left Iași in 1862. He became a member of the state council established in 1864. He was part of three cabinets: Finance Minister under Constantin Bosianu (January–June 1865), Religious Affairs Minister under Ion Ghica (July 1866-February 1867) and again Finance Minister under Lascăr Catargiu (January–March 1876). He also worked as a diplomat in Paris and Constantinople. He served in several legislatures of the Romanian Parliament. Following Alexandru Ioan Cuza's coup in May 1864, he became Senator; in April 1866, he was elected to the Constituent Assembly for Mihăileni; in 1875 he was elected to what was now the Assembly of Deputies, for Suceava County; and he was again a senator at the time of his death.

His principal work was Economia politică ("Political Economy", 1869), the country's first university-level treatise on the subject. He also wrote Un coup d'oeil sur le question roumaine ("A Look at the Romanian Question", 1858), De Italorum jure criminali ("On Italian Criminal Law", 1859) and Studii asupra bugetului ("Studies on the Budget", 1868). Strat was among those who helped set up institutions for the nascent Romanian state after the Union of the Principalities in 1859. He helped cement political economy as a science, and trained students with a view toward modernizing the economy. He believed Romania would remain an agricultural country for the time being and saw no possibility of industrialization taking place, because the necessary conditions were not present. A committed supporter of free trade, he believed economic activity was governed by natural forces and should be free of all constraints, including state-imposed ones. This belief extended to opposing forced state-sponsored industrialization.
