= Doru Romulus Costea =

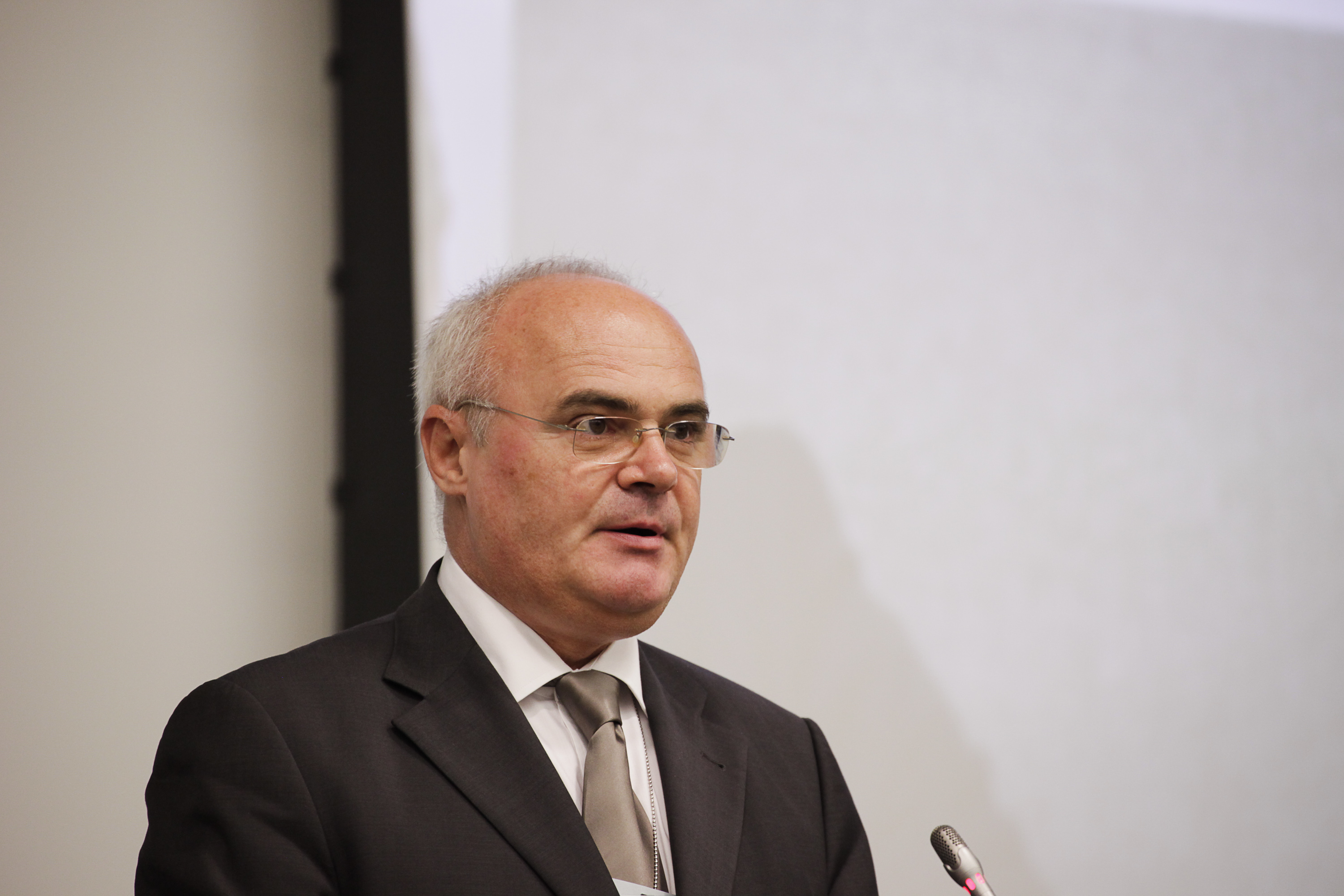
Doru Romulus Costea, Deputy Minister of Foreign Affairs of Romania at the Conference on Facilitating the Entry into Force of the Comprehensive Nuclear-Test-Ban Treaty (CTBTO), 2011

Doru Romulus Costea is best known as President of the United Nations Human Rights Council. Costea served as president from 19 June 2007 to 18 June 2008. His main task was to initiate the Universal Periodic Review of the human rights records of the then 192 member states of the United Nations.

== Personal details ==
Costea was born 22 September 1953 at Cehu Silvaniei, Salaj, Romania. He is married and has one son.

== Education ==
Costea attended the University of Bucharest where his principal studies were Arabic and English. He took a one-year post-graduate course in International Law at the Academy of Political Science.

== Career ==
In 1976, Costea was briefly a desk officer for PRODEXPORT Foreign Trade Company. From 1976 to 1989, he was an interpreter at the International Center for Political Studies. In 1990, he became the deputy director for the Department of Middle East and North Africa in the Ministry of Foreign Affairs. From 1991 to 1995, he served as Romania's ambassador to the State of Kuwait and the Sultanate of Oman. From 1995 to 1997, he was the Director of the Policy Planning Department in the Ministry of Foreign Affairs. From 1997 to 2001, he served as Romania's ambassador to the Arab Republic of Egypt. From 2001 to 2003, Costea was the Director of the Department of Analysis and Information in the Ministry of Foreign Affairs. In December 2003, he became the Permanent Representative of Romania to the United Nations Office and to international organizations in Geneva. From March 1, 2012 to October 26, 2017 he was Romanian Ambassador in China.

== United Nations Human Rights Council ==
The United Nations Human Rights Council appointed Costea to be its president at the same time as it approved a set of procedures known as the Universal Periodic Review. In September 2007, Costea took part in the selection of the first countries to be reviewed. During Costea's presidency, the Council considered the political situations in Myanmar, Darfur, Liberia, Sudan, Israel, Somalia, discussed the "world food crisis", and received the first reports produced under the Universal Periodic Review; the Council held a general debate on racism and racial discrimination, and discussed the follow-up to The Durban Declaration and Programme of Action.

Also during Costea's presidency, the Council took the controversial decision to appoint Richard A. Falk to a six-year term as a United Nations Special Rapporteur on "the situation of human rights in the Palestinian territories occupied since 1967".
