= List of ambassadors of Romania to China =

Coordinates: 39.915851°N 116.447163°E

Ambassador of Romania to China
- Ambasador al României la Beijing
- Coat of arms of Romania
- Incumbent; Dan Maxim since November 9, 2023
- Inaugural holder: Teodor Rudenco
- Formation: March 10, 1950

The Romanian Ambassador to China is the official representative of the Government in Bucharest to the Government in Beijing (People's Republic of China). He is concurrently accredited in Ulaanbator (Mongolia).

China is nowadays Romania's largest commercial partner after the EU and the accelerating pace of bilateral trade.

== List of Ambassadors ==
Diplomatic agrément/Diplomatic accreditation	Ambassador	Observations	List of heads of state of Romania	Premier of the People's Republic of China	Term end
10 March 1950	Teodor Rudenco		Constantin Ion Parhon	Zhou Enlai	December 1952
1952	Iacob Coţoveanu		Petru Groza	Zhou Enlai	
1956	Nicolae Cioroiu		Petru Groza	Zhou Enlai	
18 November 1957	Teodor Rudenco		Petru Groza	Zhou Enlai	1958
1959	Barbu Zaharescu		Ion Gheorghe Maurer	Zhou Enlai	1961
1961	Gheorghiu Dumitru		Gheorghe Gheorghiu-Dej	Zhou Enlai	1966
1966	Aurel Duma		Chivu Stoica	Zhou Enlai	1971
1972	Nicolae Gavrilescu		Nicolae Ceaușescu	Zhou Enlai	1978
6 July 1978	Florea Dumitrescu		Nicolae Ceaușescu	Hua Guofeng	15 April 1983
1987	Angelo Miculescu		Nicolae Ceaușescu	Li Peng	19 March 1990
4 June 1990	Romulus Ioan Budura		Ion Iliescu Emil Constantinescu	Li Peng	16 January 1996
1999	Ioan Donca		Emil Constantinescu Ion Iliescu	Zhu Rongji	2002
20 November 2002	Viorel Isticioaia Budura		Ion Iliescu Traian Băsescu	Zhu Rongji Wen Jiabao	1 March 2012
1 March 2012	Doru Romulus Costea		Traian Băsescu Klaus Iohannis	Wen Jiabao Li Keqiang	2016
26 October 2017	Basil Vasilica Constantinescu		Klaus Iohannis	Li Keqiang Li Qiang	23 May 2023
9 November 2023	Dan Maxim		Klaus Iohannis	Li Qiang	

== See also ==
- China–Romania relations
