= Csaba Sógor =

Romanian politician

Csaba Sógor MEP
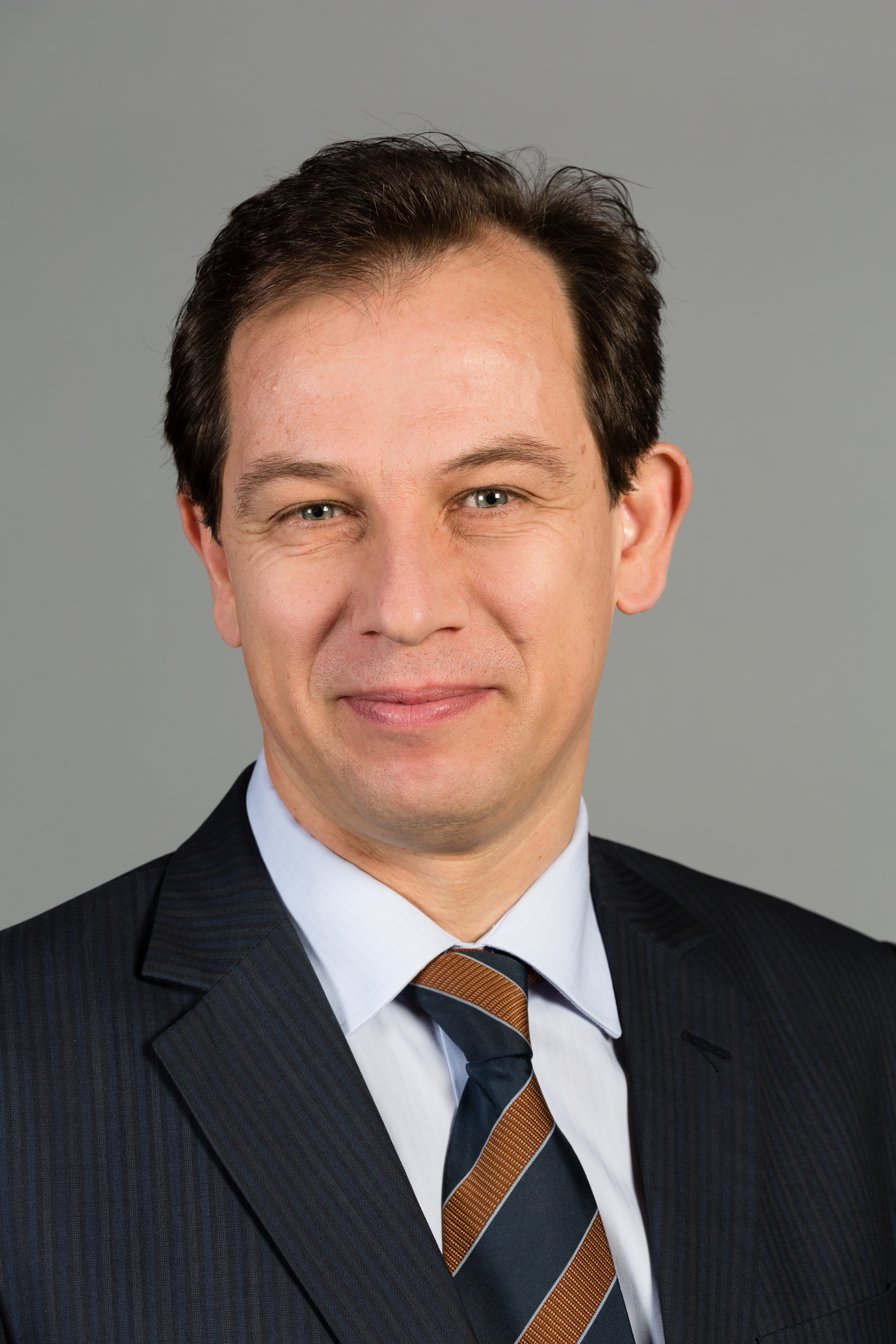
- Csaba Sógor in February 2014

Member of the European Parliament for Romania List of members of the European Parliament for Romania, 2007–09
- Incumbent
- Assumed office 2009 Serving with Seventh European Parliament

Personal details
- Born: 12 May 1964 (age 61) Arad, Romania
- Party: Democratic Union of Hungarians in Romania
- Children: 4

Csaba Sógor (born 12 May 1964) is a Romanian politician and Member of the European Parliament, representing the Hungarian minority. He is also the member of the Democratic Union of Hungarians in Romania. Currently Sógor is the candidate for the Member of the European Parliament on behalf of the European People's Party (EPP).

Besides Hungarian and Romanian, he is fluent in English, German and understands French.

== Education ==
He attended Cluj University from 1983 to 1988, graduating with a bachelor's degree in Theology. Sógor also holds master's degrees in Theology from the Universities of Zurich and Basel.

== Professional career ==
He began his political career in 1990 as a member of the Democratic Union of Hungarians in Romania. Since 1995, he has been a member of the Union Representatives. As a member of this party, he was elected for the first time to Congress in Cluj UDMR. He was also a pastor in the Reformed Church in Romania, serving in Ciceu from 1988 to 1999. From 2000 to 2004, he was the UDMR's Senator from Harghita, where he was a member of the Committee for Education, Science and Youth. Sógor was re-elected as Senator from the same party from 2004 to 2008. He was secretary of the UDMR's Parliamentary Group. He resigned from Parliament on 3 December 2007 and was replaced by Senator Vilmos Zsombori. In 2007 he was elected as a Member of the European Parliament from UDMR. Asked by journalists about his goals in Brussels, he said he would push for the Székelys' autonomy and for the Székely Hungarian language as the second language of the state, at least where the Hungarian community represents 20% of the total population.

=== Parliamentary Activities ===
He is a full Member of the LIBE Committee on Civil Liberties, Justice and Home Affairs and a substitute Member of the EMPL Committee on Employment and Social Affairs. Sógor is also in the DASE Delegation for relations with the countries of Southeast Asia and the Association of Southeast Asian Nations (ASEAN) and a substitute Member of the Delegation for relations with Japan.

== Personal life ==
He is married and has four children.
