= Necșești =

- Commune
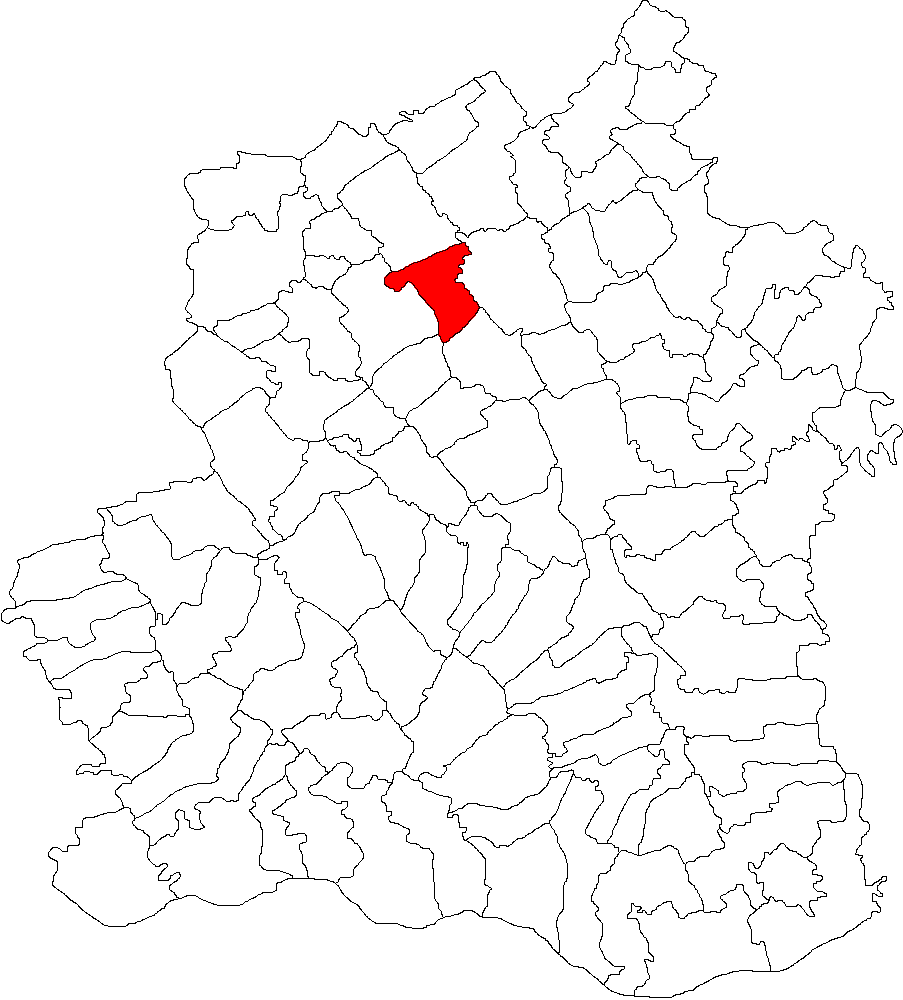
- Location in Teleorman County

- Location in Romania
- Coordinates: 44°15′N 25°09′E
- Country: Romania
- County: Teleorman
- Subdivisions: Belciug, Gârdești, Necșești

Government
  - Mayor (2020–2024): Marian-Ilie Bănăseanu (PSD)
- Area: 40.91 km^{2} (15.80 sq mi)
- Elevation: 101 m (331 ft)
- Population (2021-12-01): 1,017
  - Density: 25/km^{2} (64/sq mi)
- Time zone: EET/EEST (UTC+2/+3)
- Postal code: 147225
- Area code: +40 247
- Vehicle reg.: TR

Necșești is a commune in Teleorman County, Muntenia, Romania. It is composed of three villages: Belciug, Gârdești, and Necșești.

== Demographics ==
Historical population
Year	Pop.	±%
2002	1,623	—
2011	1,306	−19.5%
2021	1,017	−22.1%
Source: Census data

The ethnic composition of the Necșești commune (2011)
1. Romanian (95.78%)
2. Unknown (4.13%)
3. Other (0.07%)
The religious composition of the Necșești commune (2011)
1. Romanian Orthodox (91.88%)
2. Seventh-day Adventists (3.75%)
3. Unknown (4.13%)
4. Other Religions (0.22%)

According to the 2011 Romanian census, the population of Necșești was 1,306, a decrease from 1,623 in 2002; out of the 1,306 inhabitants, 1,251 declared to be Romanians. As for religious denomination, the majority of the residents were Romanian Orthodox, with a small minority of Seventh-day Adventists. At the 2021, the commune's population had decreased to 1,017, of which 90.86% were Romanians.

== Natives ==
- Florea Dumitrescu (1927 – 2018), economist and diplomat

== Politics and Administration ==
Necșești is administered by a mayor and a local council composed of 9 councilors. The current mayor, Marian-Ilie Bănăseanu, is from the Social Democratic Party, and has been in office since 2016. As of the 2020 Romanian local elections, the local council has the following composition by political parties:

Party	Councilors
Social Democratic Party	6
National Liberal Party	3
