= Sebastian Vlădescu =

Romanian economist and politician

Minister of Public Finance
- In office 22 August 2005 – 4 April 2007
- Preceded by: Ionuţ Popescu
- Succeeded by: Varujan Vosganian

Personal details
- Born: 3 April 1958 (age 67)
- Party: Independent
- Profession: Economist

Sebastian Teodor Gheorghe Vlădescu (born 3 April 1958) is a Romanian economist and politician. A former member of the National Liberal Party (PNL), he was the Minister of Public Finance of Romania in the first Călin Popescu-Tăriceanu cabinet (between 22 August 2005 and 4 April 2007) and starting from 23 December 2009 in the Emil Boc cabinet.

== Biography ==
=== Education ===
Sebastian Vlădescu was born on 3 April 1958. Vlădescu graduated in 1983 from the Commerce Faculty of the Academy of Economic Studies in Bucharest and then, the postgraduation studies in Capital Markets, Direct Investments, organized by Merrill Lynch (1997).

After graduating, he worked as an economist (in charge of debt collection) at COS Târgoviște (1983) and economist (in charge of carrying out investment programs, acquisitions, payments to suppliers) at IRVMR Bucharest (1983-1990). After the Revolution of December 1989, he entered the private sector as a shareholder and financial director at the following companies: Gas Prod Com SRL Bucharest (1990-1992), Comp Banc SRL Bucharest (1992-1994) and Medist S.A. Bucharest (1994-1997), dealing with the coordination of marketing and financial-banking activities, financing, payments and foreign exchange operations.

=== Politician ===
Member of NLP, Sebastian Vladescu becomes after the parliamentary elections of October 1996, Secretary of State at the Ministry of Industry and Trade (January - June 1997), being responsible for the financial department, hiring payments including subsidies and transfers, and the representative of the Ministry of Industry and Trade negotiations with the IMF and the World Bank. In parallel, he also worked at Eximbank, in the Interministerial Commission for Guarantees for External Credits (February - August 1997). During the Romanian Democratic Convention government, he was a State Secretary and a Counselor in the Ministry of Industry and Commerce in the Victor Ciorbea cabinet (1997) and in the Ministry of Finance (between 1998 and 2000, during the premierships of Radu Vasile and Mugur Isărescu). He then serves as an adviser to the Minister of Industry and Trade, a representative of the MIC in negotiations with the IMF and the WB and on the implementation of agreements (July - December 1997) and an adviser to the Minister of Finance on budgetary issues, capital markets, SME development, etc. (January - April 1998).

After a short journey as a shareholder and chief financial officer at Medist S.A. Bucharest (1998–1999), Vladescu returns to the Ministry of Finance as an advisor to the Minister of Finance on budgetary issues, capital markets, development of SME activities, etc. (October-December 1999) and Secretary of State (January-December 2000). In 2000 he was appointed in parallel as Chairman of the Board of Trustees of AVAB, Chairman of the Romanian Chamber of Auditors, member of the Interministerial Commission for Guarantees for External Loans at Eximbank, member of the Privatization Commission of BCR and the Board of Directors of CEC, fulfilling all these functions until January 2001.

With the change of government after the elections in November 2000, Vlădescu returned as CFO to Medist S.A. Bucharest (2001-2005). During this period, he was appointed by PNL as a member of the Board of Directors of Petromservice (2002 - February 2003), Upetrom 1 Mai Ploiești (2002-2005) and Petrom (2005), as well as chairman of the Supervisory Board of the Banca Comercială Română.(April - August 2005).

=== Personal life ===
Sebastian Vlădescu speaks French, English and Italian very well. According to the daily Evenimentul Zilei, he is Traian Băsescu mate.

== Minister of Finance ==
On 22 August 2005, Sebastian Vlădescu was appointed Minister of Finance in the Tariceanu Government, holding this position until 5 April 2007, when the Ministry of Finance was merged with the Government of Romania.

Following the reorganization of the Ministry of Economy and Finance, Vladescu was appointed the Secretary of State for International Relations and Treasury. In the summer of 2007, he came into conflict with Minister Varujan Vosganian because he claimed that the budget did not have the financial resources to increase pensions, posing a danger to macroeconomic stability. "It is a budgetary effort of about two billion euros, money that will be cut from investments and will be found directly in consumption," he said. Vosganian said the funding for increased pensions will be provided by additional budget revenues, driven by economic growth.

Sebastian Vlădescu resigned as Secretary of State on 22 October 2007, after the completion of the privatization process of Automobile Craiova (where Vladescu held the position of President of the Privatization Commission) with the American company Ford.

Vlădescu is a member of two Boards of Directors, respectively Petrom S.A. and Upetrom S.A. He is also a shareholder in the following companies: PVB Euroconsulting S.R.L .; Boss Exim Trading Group S.R.L .; Boss Construction and Consulting S.R.L .; Hemat-Rom S.R.L .; "Polimed" Medical Center; Romanian Soft Company S.R.L., Climate Change S.R.L., Rapid Credit S.R.L.

In August 2011, Sebastian Vlădescu became a consultant for Roșia Montană Gold Corporation, the Romanian subsidiary of Gabriel Resources, which intends to carry out the Roșia Montană gold mining project, a project contested by a large part of civil society.

== Controversies ==
In 2018 he was arrested for taking bribes linked to a railway contract. He denies the charges, but brought 3 kilograms of gold worth €110,000 EUR and an additional €315,000 in cash to bail himself on corruption charges. The bail procedure was recently introduced in the Romanian penal code and represents an alternative to preventive arrest. Since the procedure came into force in 2014, this is the first time a bail was partially or fully redeemed in gold, according to the DNA website.

For the rest of the €1 million sum, Mr.Vladescu offered real-estate guarantees. The valuables were deposited in an account belonging to the National Anticorruption Directorate according to the institution's press releases.
