= Mihai Tănăsescu =

Romanian economist and politician

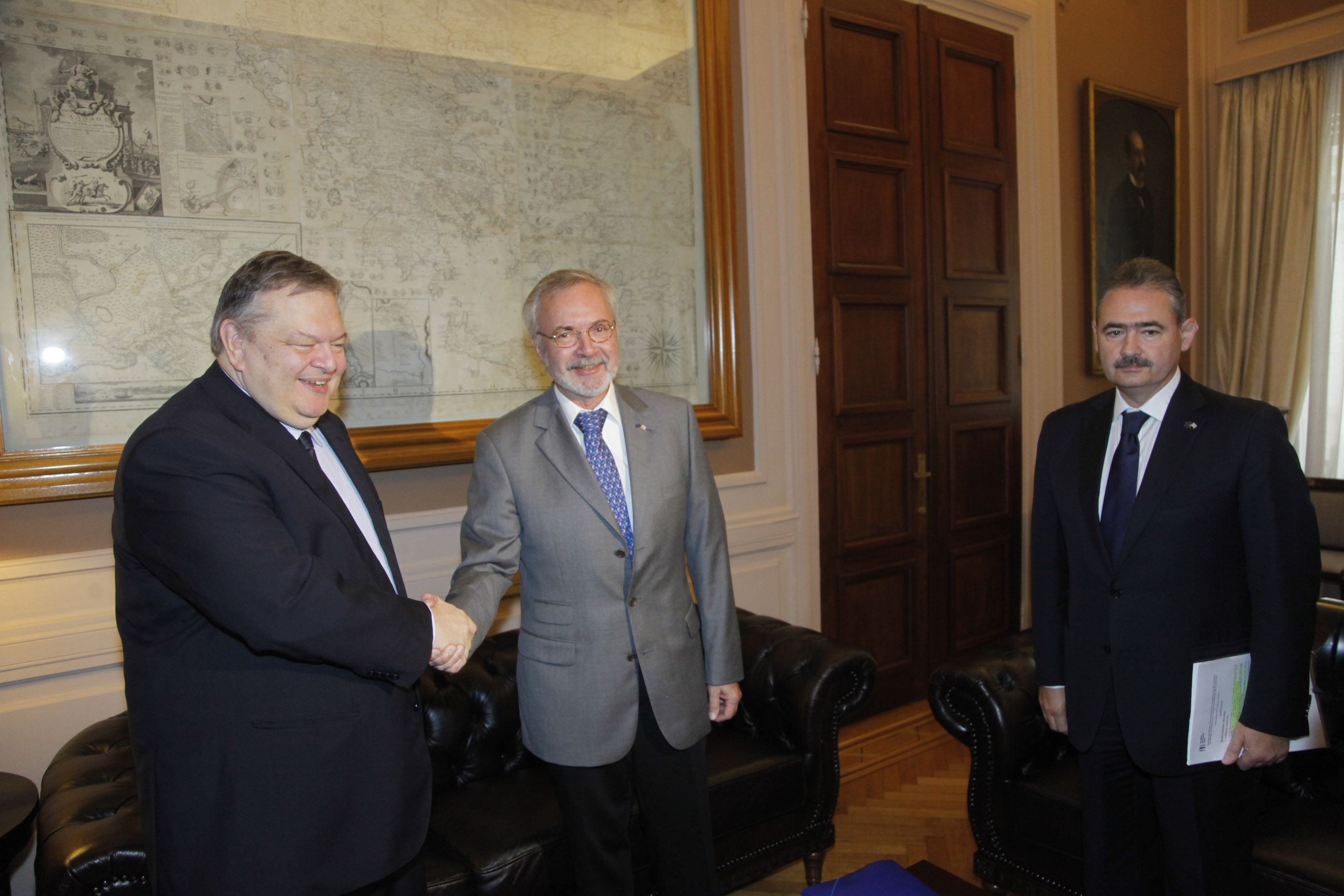
Deputy Prime Minister and Minister of Foreign Affairs, Evangelos Venizelos, met with the President of the European Investment Bank, Werner Hoyer, and with the Bank's Vice President, responsible for Greece, Mr. Mihai Tanasescu. 2013

Mihai Nicolae Tănăsescu (born January 11, 1956) is a Romanian economist and politician.

Born in Bucharest, he graduated from the finance and accounting faculty of the Bucharest Academy of Economic Studies in 1978. From that year until 1983, he headed the accounting department at a Bucharest factory. From 1983 to 1990, he was an economist at the Finance Ministry. Following the Romanian Revolution, he remained at the ministry, heading a series of departments until 1997. From 1997 to 2000, he worked at the World Bank. From 2000 to 2004, he was Finance Minister in the Adrian Năstase cabinet. In 2002, he was made both a commander of the Legion of Honour and a knight of the Order of the Star of Romania. In 2004, he was elected to the Chamber of Deputies on the lists of the Social Democratic Party; he served until May 2007, when he resigned. In the Chamber, he represented Argeș County, and was president of the budget and finance committee. Following his resignation, he became Romania's representative at the International Monetary Fund. In 2012, he was named a vice president of the European Investment Bank.

He is married and has two children.
