= Alexandru Nazare =

Romanian politician

Alexandru Nazare (born 25 June 1980) is a Romanian politician who currently serves as the Minister of Finance of Romania since June 2025, in the Bolojan cabinet. He previously served as Minister of Finance between December 2020 and July 2021. He was elected as a senator in the 2020 parliamentary elections and the special representative of the Romanian Government for Romania's candidacy for hosting the European Cybersecurity Competence Centre, 2020. Previously, he held the position of Minister of Transport and Infrastructure in 2012 and, in December 2008, became the youngest representative of Romania in the European Parliament.

== Biography ==
Alexandru Nazare was born on 25 June 1980 in Onești, Bacău County, Romania, into a family of teachers, his mother being a German teacher and his father, a sports teacher.

In 2001, he began studying political science at the National School of Political and Administrative Studies in Bucharest. Between 2002 and 2004, he continued his studies in Berlin at Bard College Berlin, where he studied International Relations, European Affairs, Political Theory and Neoconservatism. Later, from 2015 to 2017, Nazare pursued an MPA at Hertie School (HSG) in Berlin.

== Background and government career ==
After completing his studies, Alexandru Nazare began his political career as a ministerial advisor at the Ministry of European Integration, working under Anca Boagiu in the period preceding Romania's accession to the European Union.

In 2007, he became an adviser to the Group of the European People's Party in the European Parliament. The following year, he ran in the European Parliamentary elections on the PDL lists, becoming the youngest Romanian MEP in the EP. From this position, Nazare worked in the Committee on Budgets and in the Committee on Foreign Affairs, where he managed to stand out by submitting several motions for resolutions, including some on the Republic of Moldova, energy strategy projects or Romani people rights.

After his term as a Member of the European Parliament ended in 2009, Alexandru Nazare was appointed Secretary of State at the Department for European Affairs, having the responsibility of representing Romania in the dialogue with the European institutions.

Starting in April 2010, Alexandru Nazare became Secretary of State in the Ministry of Public Finance, overseeing the Certification and Payment Authority, the Phare Payments and Contracting Office, as well as the tax department.

Between November 2010 and February 2012, he was appointed Secretary of State in the Ministry of Transport and Infrastructure, coordinating civil aviation institutions and structures subordinated to the Ministry. Also in this term, Nazare played an important role in mediating discussions between the ministry and international financial institutions, serving as the chief negotiator for joint evaluation missions with international financial institutions and monitoring of externally funded projects.

=== Minister of Transport and Infrastructure ===
Following the resignation of the Boc Government II, in February 2012, Alexandru Nazare was appointed Minister of Transport in the Mihai Răzvan Ungureanu Government.

During his tenure at the Ministry of Transport and Infrastructure, he obtained approval from the European Commission for financing railway system rehabilitation projects worth 800 million euros and initiated a tender for motorway sections funded by European resources, worth 850 million. As a minister, he tendered for the restoration of feasibility studies for the Sibiu-Pitești and Comarnic - Brașov highways, the first to be financed from European funds and the second through public-private partnership; however, the auctions were canceled by the new government in autumn 2012.

In 2012, Alexandru Nazare was elected deputy on the Democratic Liberal Party list for a 4-year term, during which he was noted for his work in several parliamentary committees, including the Committee on Economic Policy, Reform and Privatization, the Committee on European Affairs, Committee on Transport and Infrastructure.

=== 2016 local elections ===
In the last year of his parliamentary term, Alexandru Nazare decided to run for Sector 1 City Hall, supported by the National Liberal Party in the May 2016 local elections. He proposes a new vision for Sector 1, focusing on a series of strategic urban development and traffic reduction projects. The objectives proposed by him remained a priority even 4 years later, after the 2016-2020 mandate was won by the candidate supported by PSD at the City Hall of Sector 1.

In November, he became an adviser to the Minister at the Ministry of Transport, Infrastructure and Communications, advocating for several infrastructure projects.

=== Minister of Finance ===
In the Romanian parliamentary elections of December 2020, Alexandru Nazare was re-elected as a member of the Romanian Parliament, securing a senator's mandate.

By the end of 2020, he was appointed Minister of Finance in the Cîțu Cabinet. He begins this term by outlining an economic program formulated according to the relaunch principle, based on a series of liberal economic policies and a prudent fiscal-budgetary attitude. Despite the recession generated by the context of the COVID-19 pandemic, Nazare manages to develop a budget formula to lead the Romanian economy towards a path of sustainable fiscal adjustment.

The new minister starts in full force the activity within the Ministry of Finance by ordering some internal controls at the headquarters of ANAF Bucharest, after the institution sent summonses to the taxpayers for amounts already paid. Nazare's agenda in the Ministry of Finance focuses on economic recovery, reform and integration, with special attention paid to projects to digitize the Romanian tax administration.

On 8 July 2021, Nazare was ousted from the position of Minister of Public Finance, and his predecessor, then-incumbent Prime Minister Florin Cîțu, became acting minister.

On 23 June 2025, Alexandru Nazare was reappointed as Minister of Finance in the Bolojan cabinet.

== Projects and initiatives ==
In 2020, Nazare achieved a performance for Romania as the special representative of the Romanian Government for Romania's candidacy for hosting the European Cybersecurity Competence Centre. The Romanian team, led by Alexandru Nazare, won the competition with the other 6 states that submitted their candidacy to host the Cyber Security Center, the only European agency in charge of managing the European Union's investments in the field of cyber security.
