= Viorel Isticioaia Budura =

Romanian diplomat

Viorel Isticioaia Budura (born 31 July 1952) is a Romanian diplomat who has headed the European Union delegation to Japan since December 2014. He was ambassador to South Korea from June 2000 until October 2002 and China and Mongolia from October 2002 until January 2010.

In the 1970s, Isticioaia Budura studied philosophy at the University of Bucharest and Chinese and literature at Nankai University in Tianjin.

== Honors ==
- Order of the Rising Sun, 2nd Class, Gold and Silver Star (2020)
