= European Cybersecurity Competence Centre =

Competence Centre of the EU dealing with cybersecurity

European Cybersecurity Industrial, Technology and Research Competence Centre

EU executive agency overview
- Formed: 20 May 2021
- Jurisdiction: European Union
- Headquarters: Bucharest, Romania
- EU executive agency executive: Miguel González Sancho, Interim Executive Director
- Key document: Regulation (EU) 2021/887
- Website: cybersecurity-centre.europa.eu

Map
- European Cybersecurity Competence Centre (European Union)

The European Cybersecurity Competence Centre (ECCC), officially the European Cybersecurity Industrial, Technology and Research Competence Centre, is an executive agency of the European Union headquartered in Bucharest, Romania, tasked with funding and coordinating cybersecurity research projects. Plans for the introduction of the ECCC were first announced in 2018 by the European Commission and the regulation to establish the centre was published in 2021. The ECCC collaborates closely with the Network of National Coordination Centres (NCCs).

== Organization ==
Although the organization of the ECCC is still being established, the planned administrative and governance structure includes:

- a Governing Board which provides strategic orientation and oversees ECCC activities
- an Executive Director who is the ECCC’s legal representative and is responsible for its day-to-day management
- a Strategic Advisory Group that ensures a comprehensive, ongoing and permanent dialogue between the Community and the Competence Centre.

=== List of National Coordination Centers ===
Country	National Coordination Center (NCC)	NCC website
Austria	Federal Chancellery of Austria in cooperation with the Austrian Research Promotion Agency	https://www.ncc.gv.at
Belgium	Centre for Cybersecurity Belgium (CCB)	ccb.belgium.be
Bulgaria	Ministry of Electronic Governance	egov.bg
Cyprus	Digital Security Authority (DSA)	dsa.cy
Czech Republic	National Cyber and Information Security Agency	nukib.gov.cz
Denmark	The Danish Business Authority	danishbusinessauthority.dk
Estonia	Estonian Information System Authority	ria.ee
Finland	Finnish Transport and Communications Agency Traficom's National Cyber Security Center (NCSC-FI)	traficom.fi
France	National Agency for Information Systems Security (ANSSI)	cyber.gouv.fr
Germany	National Coordination Center for Cybersecurity ( NKCS ) – Federal Office for Information Security (BSI)	nkcs.bund.de
Greece	National Cybersecurity Authority of Greece	cyber.gov.gr
Iceland	Eyvör - National Coordination Centre of Iceland (NCC-IS)	government.is/topics/telecommunications/ncc-is/
Ireland	National Cyber Security Centre (NCSC)	ncsc.gov.ie
Italy	Agency for national cybersecurity (ACN)	acn.gov.it
Latvia	Ministry of Defence	mod.gov.lv
Lithuania	National Coordination Center, Ministry of National Defense	kam.lt/en/national-coordination-center
Luxembourg	Luxembourg Cybersecurity Coordination Centre	securitymadein.lu/agency/ncc
Malta	Malta Information Technology Agency	mita.gov.mt
Netherlands	The Netherlands Enterprise Agency (RVO)	rvo.nl
Norway	Norwegian National Coordination Centre for Research and Innovation on Cybersecurity (NCC-NO)	ncc-no.no
Poland	National Cybersecurity Coordination Center Unit in the Chancellery of the Prime Minister	cybersecurity-centre.europa.eu/nccs_en
Romania	Centrul Național de Coordonare	ncc.gov.ro/1/centrul-national-de-coordonare
Slovakia	Cyber Security Competence and Certification Center (KCCKB)	cybercompetence.sk
Slovenia	Office of the Government of the Republic of Slovenia for Information Security	uiv.gov.si/ncc
Spain	The National Cybersecurity Institute (INCIBE)	incibe.es
Sweden	Swedish Civil Contingencies Agency	msb.se
