= Eugen Teodorovici =

Romanian politician (born 1971)

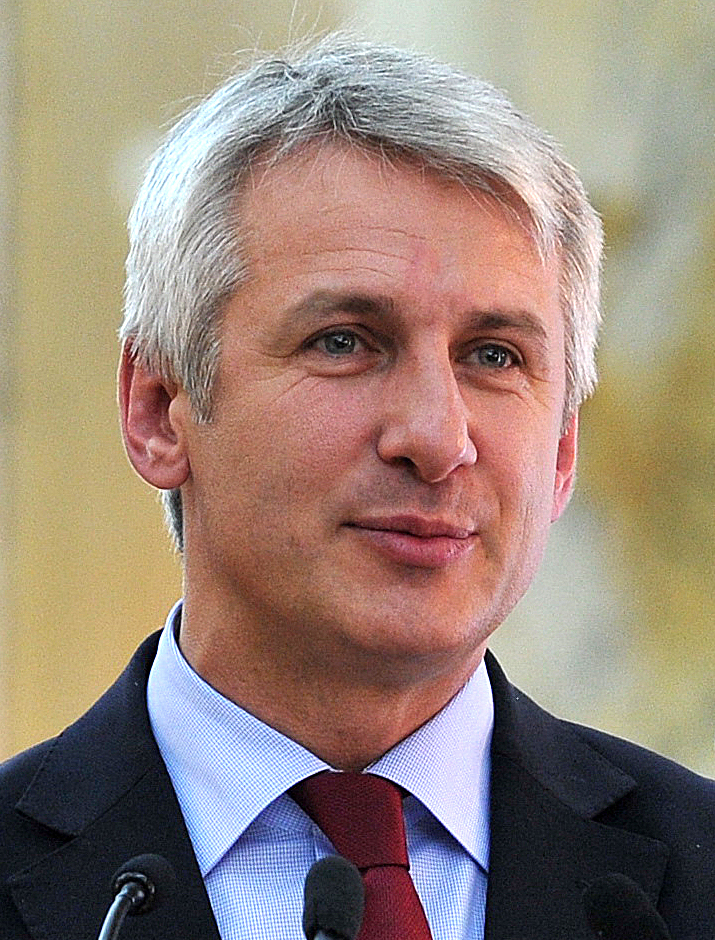
- Teodorovici in 2014

Minister of Finance
- In office 29 January 2018 – 4 November 2019
- Preceded by: Ionuț Mișa
- Succeeded by: Florin Cîțu
- In office 30 March 2015 – 17 November 2015
- Preceded by: Darius Vâlcov
- Succeeded by: Anca Dragu

Member of the Senate
- In office 21 December 2012 – 21 December 2020
- Constituency: Buzău (2012–2016); Tulcea (2016–2020)

Personal details
- Born: 12 August 1971 (age 54)
- Party: Social Democratic Party

Eugen Orlando Teodorovici (born 12 August 1971) is a Romanian politician of the Social Democratic Party. He served as minister of finance in 2015, and from 2018 to 2019. From 2012 to 2015, he served as minister of EU funds. He was a member of the Senate from 2012 to 2020.
