= Mihai Săulescu =

Romanian jurist and politician (1861–1929)

Mihai N. Săulescu (October 16, 1861 – December 5, 1929) was a Romanian jurist and politician.

== Life ==
Born in Craiova, he studied economics and finance at Berlin University and obtained a doctorate in law from the University of Paris. He subsequently taught law at the University of Bucharest. A member of the Conservative Party, Săulescu served in the Assembly of Deputies, rising to become vice president of that body. He was a general secretary within the Finance Ministry and, from March to October 1918, served as Finance Minister in the cabinet of Alexandru Marghiloman. The owner of a large library and a rich collection of documents, he sheltered these in Russia during World War I. In late 1922, he entered the People's Party.
