= Liberal Democratic Party (Romania) =

Liberal Democratic Party Partidul Liberal Democrat
- Leader: Theodor Stolojan
- Founded: December 2006
- Dissolved: 15 December 2007
- Split from: National Liberal Party
- Merged into: Democratic Liberal Party
- Headquarters: Calea Victoriei 100, et.1, ap.16 Sector 1 Bucharest
- Ideology: Conservative liberalism
- Political position: Centre-right
- European Parliament group: EPP-ED
- Colours: Orange and blue

Website
- www.platformaliberala.ro

The Liberal Democratic Party (Romanian: Partidul Liberal Democrat, PLD) was a political party in Romania, formed in December 2006 as a breakaway/splinter group from the National Liberal Party (PNL). The Liberal Democratic Party was headed by Theodor Stolojan, a former PNL leader, and included a series of prominent former National Liberals, such as Gheorghe Flutur, Mona Muscă, and Valeriu Stoica, who were opposed to the leadership of the PNL, then headed by former Prime Minister Călin Popescu-Tăriceanu.

The Liberal Democrats also advocated a closer co-operation with the Democratic Party (PD) and President Traian Băsescu. The PNL and the PD were part of the Justice and Truth governing alliance until Popescu-Tăriceanu dismissed the PD ministers in April 2007 and formed a minority government with the Democratic Alliance of Hungarians in Romania (UDMR), formally marking the end of the alliance.

The members of the PLD had initially grouped themselves in an informal organization known as the Liberal Platform (Platforma Liberală). The slogan of the PLD was Progress, Liberty, Dignity.

The PLD merged with the Democratic Party (PD) to form the Democratic Liberal Party (PDL) in January 2008. The merger was approved in a party congress on 15 December 2007 with 933 votes in favour, six abstentions, and one against.

== Ideology ==
On 22 January 2007, the vice-president of the PLD, Gheorghe Flutur, stated that the new party will forge a close relationship with the Romanian Orthodox Church, the country's largest religious denomination. Flutur declared that, "We believe that we must fight for the protection of [our] national identity, especially now, when Romania has entered the European Union. Here, we consider that we must have a very good relationship with the institution of the Romanian Orthodox Church and I think that [the church] must play a much more important role in the promotion of our traditions and customs."

== Merger with PD ==
The Liberal Democratic Party intended to join the European People's Party at EU level. In a televised show however, Vasile Blaga put an end to this rumor, stating PD will go alone at the European parliamentary elections. In January 2008, however, the party merged with the Democratic Party (PD) to form the Democratic Liberal Party (PDL), which became a member of the European People's Party (EPP).

== Electoral history ==
=== European elections ===
Election	Votes	Percentage	MEPs	Position	Political group
2007	398,901	7.8%	3 / 35	4th	European People's Party (EPP)
