= Dan Vîlceanu =

Romanian politician

Minister of European Funds
- In office 25 November 2021 – 2 April 2022
- Preceded by: Florin Cîțu (ad interim)

Minister of Finance
- In office 18 August 2021 – 25 November 2021
- Preceded by: Florin Cîțu (ad interim)
- Succeeded by: Adrian Câciu

Minister of Transport
- Acting
- In office 7 September 2021 – 25 November 2021
- Preceded by: Cătălin Drulă
- Succeeded by: Sorin Grindeanu

Member of the Romanian Chamber of Deputies
- Incumbent
- Assumed office 21 December 2016

Personal details
- Born: February 5, 1979 (age 46); Bumbești-Jiu, Gorj County, Romania
- Political party: National Liberal Party (since 2015); Democratic Liberal Party (2009–2015); Social Democratic Party (before 2009)
- Education: West University of Timișoara

Dan Vîlceanu (born February 5, 1979) is a Romanian deputy, elected in 2016. On 25 November 2021, he was sworn in as Minister of Investments and European Projects in the Ciucă Cabinet.

Between 2006 and 2009 Dan Vîlceanu was the leader of the Gorj branch of Social Democratic Youth, the youth organisation of the Social Democratic Party (PSD) of Romania.

Vîlceanu then joined the Democratic Liberal Party (PDL) to serve as General Secretary (2011–2012), first deputy chairman (2012–2013), and chairman of the Gorj branch of the party (2013–2015). After the PDL merged with the National Liberal Party (PNL), he had been serving as co-chairman/chairman of the latter's Gorj branch respectively since 2015, and as Secretary-General of the latter party since 26 September 2021.

Furthermore, he also served as Minister of Finance in the PNL-led Cîțu cabinet, between 18 August and 25 November 2021. Additionally, between 7 September and 25 November 2021, he served as acting Minister of Transport in the same cabinet.

On 2 April 2022, Vîlceanu resigned as both Minister of European Funds and PNL secretary-general.

On the 21st of May 2024 while in the Parliament's building, Dan Vilceanu attacked one of his colleagues, an MP from the National Liberal Party and bit his nose.
