= Ludovic Steege =

Moldavian and later Romanian physician, diplomat, judge and politician

Ludovic Steege (September 6, 1813–March 28, 1872) was a Moldavian, later Romanian physician, diplomat, judge and politician.

Born in Bucharest, Steege's father was a Transylvanian Saxon pharmacist who settled there. The father was from Kronstadt (Brașov), with family from there and from Mediasch (Mediaș); his mother was born to an Austrian nobleman. Steege studied at the Ludwig-Maximilians-Universität München and the University of Paris. In 1839, he took an undergraduate law degree and a medical doctorate from the University of Paris. Leaving Western Europe in 1841, he moved to Iași, where he practiced medicine. From 1853 to 1858, he organized the city's medical system. He became a naturalized citizen in 1855.

A liberal supporter of the Union of the Principalities, Steege held a number of offices during the reign of Alexandru Ion Cuza. In early 1859, he was appointed to the Danube Commission. Soon after, he was sent to Berlin in order to obtain approval for the double election of Cuza as prince. In March-April of that year, he was Public Works Minister in the Moldavian government of Ion Ghica. He sat on the Focșani Central Commission, and in 1862 was named to the High Court of Cassation and Justice. From October 1863 to January 1865, he was Finance Minister under Mihail Kogălniceanu.

Following Cuza's overthrow in 1866, he joined two delegations. The first went to Paris to argue in favor of bringing a foreign prince to the throne. The second went to Düsseldorf, where it informed Prince Karl of Hohenzollern-Sigmaringen that he had been elected by plebiscite. From August to October 1867, he was again Finance Minister, under Ștefan Golescu. The following April, he was re-appointed to the High Court. Between 1868 and 1871, he served as diplomatic agent at Vienna, Saint Petersburg and Berlin. He died in Iași.
