= Valeriu Stoica =

Romanian politician and academic

Valeriu Stoica Ph.D.
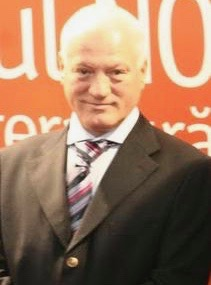

Minister of Justice
- In office 12 December 1996 – 28 December 2000
- Prime Minister: Victor Ciorbea; Gavril Dejeu (Acting); Radu Vasile; Alexandru Athanasiu (Acting); Mugur Isărescu
- Preceded by: Ion Predescu
- Succeeded by: Rodica Stănoiu

Member of the International Institute of Human Rights
- Incumbent
- Assumed office 1992

Member of the European Commission against Racism and Intolerance
- Incumbent
- Assumed office 1994

Member of the Chamber of Deputies
- In office 22 November 1996 – 29 September 2003
- Constituency: Bucharest

Leader of the National Liberal Party
- In office 18 February 2001 – 24 August 2002
- Preceded by: Mircea Ionescu-Quintus
- Succeeded by: Theodor Stolojan

Personal details
- Born: Valeriu Stoica; 1 October 1953 (age 73) Bucharest, Romania
- Party: National Liberal Party (2014–present)
- Other political affiliations: Romanian Communist Party (1974–1989); National Liberal Party (1990–2006); Liberal Democratic Party (2006–2007); Democratic Liberal Party (2007–2014)
- Spouse: Cristiana Irinel Stoica
- Children: 1
- Education: University of Bucharest
- Occupation: Judge, attorney, professor, politician
- Profession: Jurist

Valeriu Stoica (Romanian pronunciation: [vaˈlerju ˈstojka]; born 1 October 1953, Bucharest, Socialist Republic of Romania) is a Romanian politician and academic. A professor of civil law at the University of Bucharest, he became a member of the National Liberal Party (PNL) in 1990, and was first vice-president of the party between 1997 and 2001 and then president for a brief period of time between 2001 and 2002.

Stoica was the Minister of Justice for 4 years during the CDR governance (1996–2000), contributing to the implementation of several reforms, especially regarding the protection of private property. In 2006, he left the PNL and joined Theodor Stolojan's Liberal Democrats (PLD).

Party political offices
| Preceded by Mircea Ionescu-Quintus | President of the National Liberal Party (2001–2002) | Succeeded by Theodor Stolojan |
