= Bucharest Academy of Economic Studies =

Public university in Romania

Coordinates: 44°26′51.24″N 26°5′47.94″E

Bucharest University of Economic Studies
- Academia de Studii Economice din București
- Former names: Academy of Higher-level Commercial and Industrial Studies (1913–1947); Academy of Commercial and Cooperative Studies (1947–1948); Institute for Economic Sciences and Planning"I.V Lenin"(1948–1967)
- Type: Public
- Established: 6 April 1913; 113 years ago
- Rector: Nicolae Istudor
- Administrative staff: 1,500
- Students: 22,684 (2012–2013)
- Location: Bucharest, Romania
- Website: www.ase.ro

University rankings

Regional – Overall
- QS Emerging Europe and Central Asia: 171 (2022)

The Bucharest Academy of Economic Studies (Romanian: Academia de Studii Economice din București, abbreviated ASE) is a public university in Bucharest, Romania. Founded in 1913 as the Academy of Higher-level Commercial and Industrial Studies (Academia de Înalte Studii Comerciale și Industriale (AISCI)), it has become one of the largest economic higher education institutes in both Romania and South-Eastern Europe. The Bucharest Academy of Economic Studies is classified as an advanced research and education university by the Ministry of Education. It is one of the five members of the Universitaria Consortium (the group of elite Romanian universities).

== History ==
Established on 6 April 1913 by the Royal Decree of Carol I of Romania, the Academy of Higher-level Commercial and Industrial Studies was the first economic higher education institution established in Romania.

In 1947, the academy was reorganised and merged with the Academy of Cooperative Studies to form the Academy of Commercial and Cooperative Studies. During the Communist Era, in August 1948, it turned into the Institute for Economic Sciences and Planning, according to the model provided by the Soviet higher education institutions.

During the 1967–1968 academic year, the institute was reorganised again and became the Bucharest University of Economic Studies, a name which the university still holds today.

== Institution ==
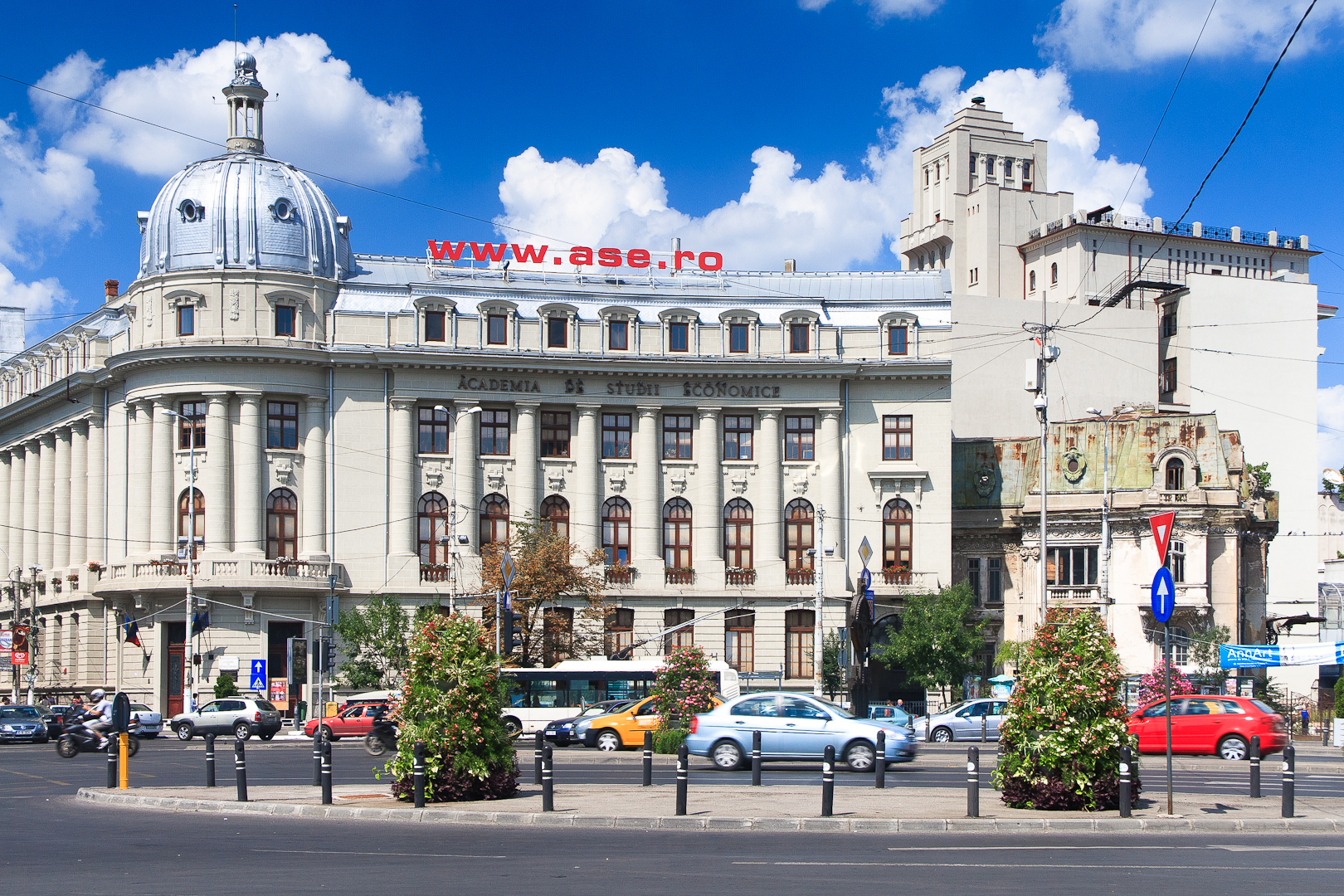
The main building in Piața Romană

The Bucharest University of Economic Studies has 22,684 students (undergraduate and graduate levels) in eleven faculties.

The university has positioned itself as a research institution, hosting 13 centers of research acknowledged and endorsed by the National Council of Scientific Research in Higher Education.

A notable presence inside ASE is the Business Information Technology department (Romanian: Informatică Economică) which is an entity that promotes an educational philosophy based on combining economics and software development as a way of creating experts suitable for the Information Age.

== Format and length of studies ==
In the 1970s and 1980s, master's degrees in economics were awarded to full-time students after 4 years of study, except for the Faculty of 'Cibernetics and Informatics', which required one additional year.

After 1990, Undergraduate studies at the Bucharest University of Economic Studies ended with a Bachelor's degree in Economics, while acquiring a second specialization according to the department where they were enrolled. Up to 2005, undergraduate studies at the Academy of Economic Studies consisted of a four-year cycle (five-year cycle for the Faculty of 'Cibernetics and Informatics'). Master studies would continue for two more years, and doctoral programmes would normally be three years long.

Since 2005 however, the university has adopted the Bologna declaration and undergraduate studies are now three-year long, followed by 2-year Master programmes. In this format, undergraduate studies finalize with a total of 180 credits, graduate programmes require a completion of 120 credits. The PhD programmes remain with a length of minimum three years.

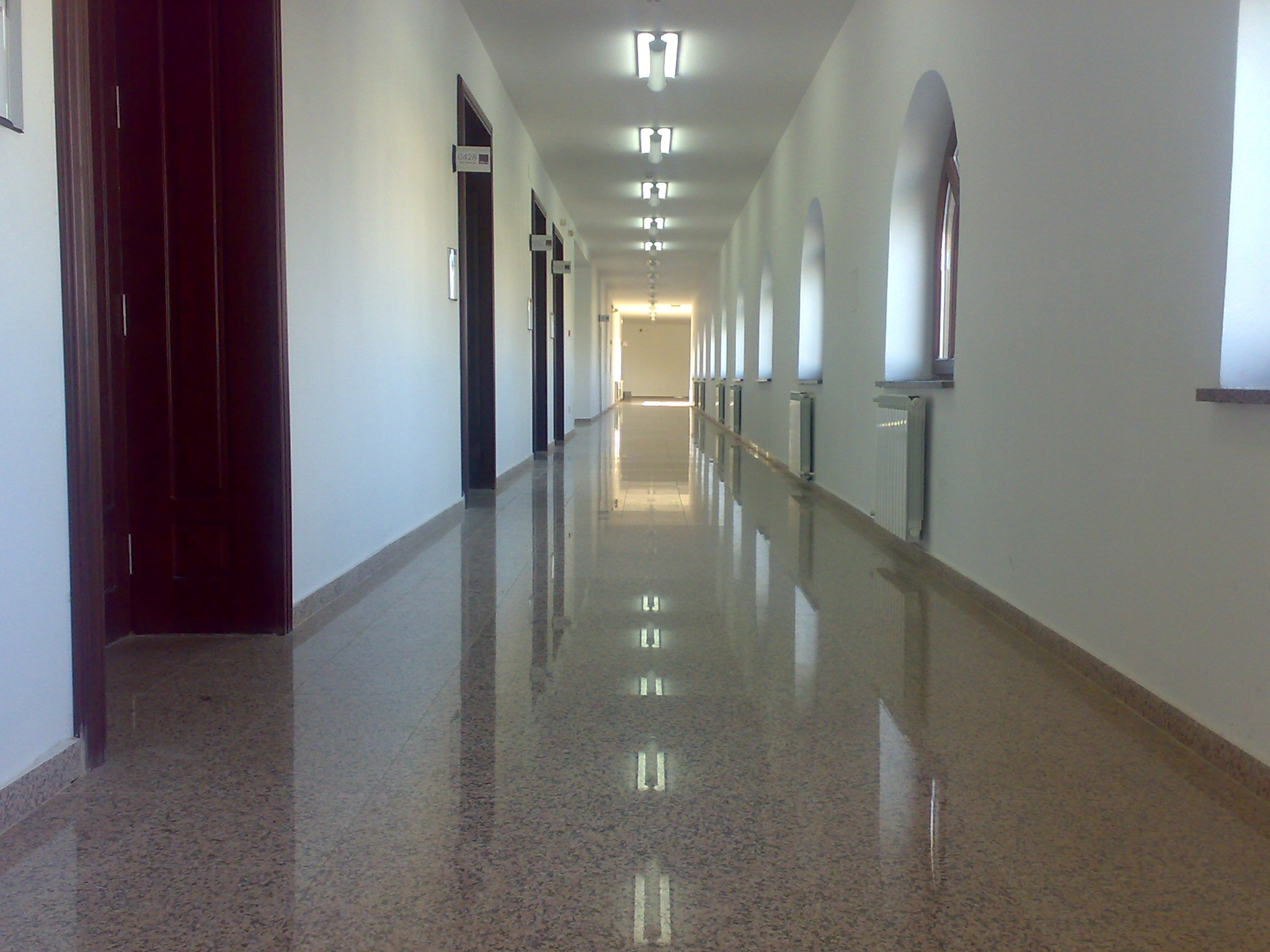
Inside the building

== Ranking ==
ASE was ranked by the Times Higher Education World University Ranking 2021 as the best university in Romania. Top Shanghai 2018 ranked ASE as the best university in Economics in Romania and 201–300 worldwide. QS World University Rankings 2017 also ranked ASE as the best university in Economics and Econometrics in Romania and 301–350 worldwide.

== Faculties ==
There are thirteen faculties:

- FABIZ - Administrarea Afacerilor cu predare în limbi străine (Business Administration in Foreign Languages);
- AMP - Administrație și Management Public (Administration and Public Management);
- BBS - Școala de Afaceri București (Bucharest Business School);
- CIG - Contabilitate și Informatică de Gestiune (Accounting and Management Information Systems);
- COM - Business and Tourism (formerly Commerce);
- CSIE - Cibernetică, Statistică şi Informatică Economică (Economic Cybernetics, Statistics, and Informatics);
- LAW - Drept (Law);
- EAM - Economia Agroalimentară şi a Mediului (Agrifood and Environmental Economics);
- ECO - Economie Teoretică și Aplicată (Economics);
- FABBV - Finanţe, Asigurări, Bănci şi Burse de Valori (Finance, Insurance, Banking, and Stock Exchanges);
- MAN - Management;
- MRK - Marketing;
- REI - Relaţii Economice Internaţionale (International Business, and Economics).
