= Ministry of Finance (Romania) =

Government ministry of Romania

- Ministerul Finanțelor
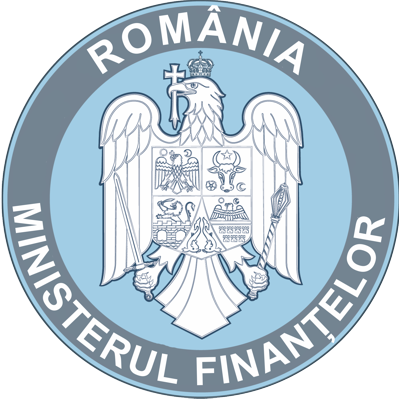

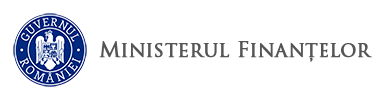
- Logo of the Romanian Ministry of Finance

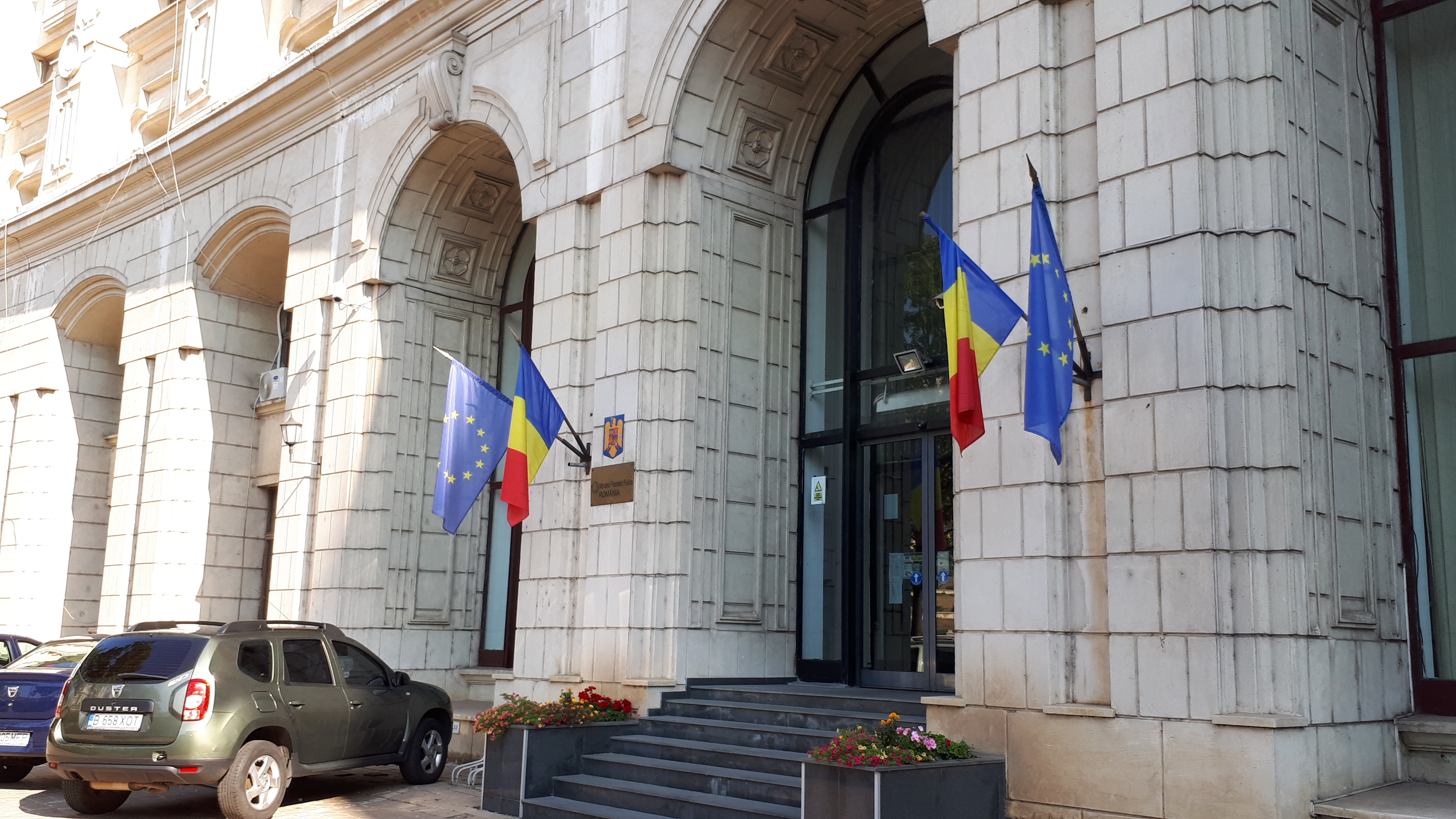

Agency overview
- Headquarters: Bucharest
- Agency executive: Alexandru Nazare, Minister
- Website: mfinante.ro

The Ministry of Finance of Romania (Romanian: Ministerul Finanțelor) is one of the fifteen ministries of the Government of Romania.

The minister's seat is currently held by Alexandru Nazare.

The following agencies are subordinated to the Minister:

- National Agency for Fiscal Administration (Agenția Națională de Administrare Fiscală)
- National Customs Authority (Autoritatea Națională a Vămilor)
- 40 Public Finances County General Directorates (Direcții generale ale finanțelor publice judeţene), the Public Finances General Directorate of Bucharest (Direcția Generală a Finanțelor Publice a Municipiului București) and the General Directorate for the Administration of Big Taxpayers (Direcția generală de administrare a marilor contribuabili)

== See also ==
- List of ministers of finance of Romania
