= Rabia =

Rabia or Rabiah is the transliteration of two Arabic names written differently in Arabic text, which may be written similarly in the Latin script:

- An Arabic, usually male name ربيع) meaning "Spring"
- An Arabic, female name (Rābiʿah رابعة) or Rabeya literally meaning "fourth female" usually referring to the sufi mystic of the same name.

Rabia, Rabiah or Rabeya may refer to:

== People ==
=== Male name Rabīʿah (ربيعة) ===
- Rabiah ibn Kab, a companion of the Islamic prophet Muhammad
- Rabiah ibn Mudhar (6th-century), Jewish king in present-day Yemen
- Ayyash ibn Abi Rabiah (died 636), companion of Muhammad
- Utbah ibn Rabi'ah (died 624), pre-Islamic Arab tribal leader
- Salman ibn Rabiah (died 650), military governor of Armenia
- Abd ar-Rahman ibn Rabiah (died 652), Arab general of the Rashidun Caliphate
- Fouad Mahmoud al Rabiah (born 1959), Kuwaiti national formerly imprisoned at Guantanamo Bay
- Robert Rabiah (born 1986), Australian film actor and writer
- Tawfiq Al Rabiah (born 1965), Saudi minister
- Abu Hamza Rabia (died 2005), Egyptian member of al-Qaeda
- Hamad Abu Rabia (1929–1981), Israeli-Arab politician
- Hassan Rabia (born 1984), Omani footballer
- Mohammed Rabia Al-Noobi (born 1981), Omani footballer
- Ramy Rabia (born 1993), Egyptian footballer
- Rabia Makhloufi (born 1986), Algerian steeplechase runner

=== Female name Rabia ===
- Rabia Akyürek (born 1999), Turkish wheelchair basketball player
- Rabia Anum, Pakistani news anchor and television host
- Rabia Ashiq (born 1992), Pakistani athlete
- Rabia of Basra (710s–801), female Muslim Sufi saint
- Rabia Balkhi (10th century), semi-legendary figure of Persian literature
- Rabia Bala Hatun (died 1324), First Wife of Osman I, founder of the Ottoman Empire
- Rabia Bhuiyan (fl. 1996–2001), Jatiya Party (Ershad) politician
- Rabia Butt (born 1990), Pakistani model and actress
- Rabia Cirit (born 1998), Turkish female para-athlete
- Rabia İlhan (born 1981), Turkish lawyer and politician
- Rabia Kayahan (born 2000), Turkish female armwrestler
- Rabia Kazan (born 1976), Turkish journalist
- Rabia Qari, Pakistani barrister
- Rabia Sultan (died 1712), haseki of Ottoman Sultan Ahmed II
- Rabia Şermi Kadın (died 1732), consort of Sultan Ahmed III and mother of Sultan Abdülhamid I
- Rabia Topuz (born 2000), Turkish boxer
- Cheikha Rabia (born 1944), Algerian singer
- Sarab Abu-Rabia-Queder (born 1976), Israeli Bedouin anthropologist and sociologist

=== Female name Rābiʿah (رابعة) ===
- Rabiah Hutchinson (born 1953), Australian militant Islamist leader

=== Rabeya ===
- Rabeya Alim (born 1950), Bangladesh Awami League politician
- Rabeya Chowdhury (fl. 1979–2006), Bangladesh Nationalist Party politician
- Rabeya Khan (born 2005), Bangladeshi cricketer
- Rabeya Khatun (1935–2021), Bangladeshi novelist
- Rabeya Müller (1957–2024), German Islamic scholar

== Places ==
- Al-Rabiaa, a village in northwestern Syria
- Diyar Rabi'a, the medieval Arabic name of the easternmost province of the Jazira (Upper Mesopotamia)
- Oum Rabia, a commune in Khénifra Province, Béni Mellal-Khénifra, Morocco
- Rabia, Iraq, a small border crossing town between Iraq and Syria
- Rabia, Syria, a town in the Latakia Governorate, northwestern Syria

== Other uses ==
- Rabīʿa, an Arab tribe
- Rabia School, Luton, Bedfordshire, England.
- Rabaa Al-Adawiya Mosque, a mosque in Cairo, Egypt
- Rabia sign, a hand gesture
- Rabeya (2008 film), Bangladeshi film

== See also ==
- Rabeya (disambiguation)
- Rabiah (disambiguation)
