= Arab studies =

Academic discipline

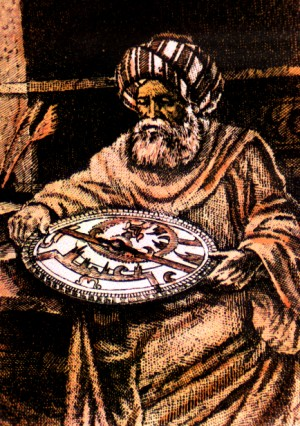
Al-Battani was an Arab astronomer, astrologer, and mathematician.

Arab studies or Arabic studies is an academic discipline centered on the study of Arabs and Arab world. It consists of several disciplines such as anthropology, sociology, linguistics, historiography, archaeology, cultural studies, economics, geography, international relations, law, literature, philosophy, psychology, political science, and public administration. The field draws from old Arabic chronicles, records and oral literature, in addition to written accounts and traditions about Arabs from explorers and geographers in the Arab world (Middle East-North Africa).

== History ==
Arab studies talk about the history of the Middle East and North Africa, before the rise of Islam to the present time. Covering a wide range of topics, such as methods, approaches, colonial history, gender, environmental and legal dimensions. It depends on the political, economic, social and cultural history of the region.

== Linguistic ==
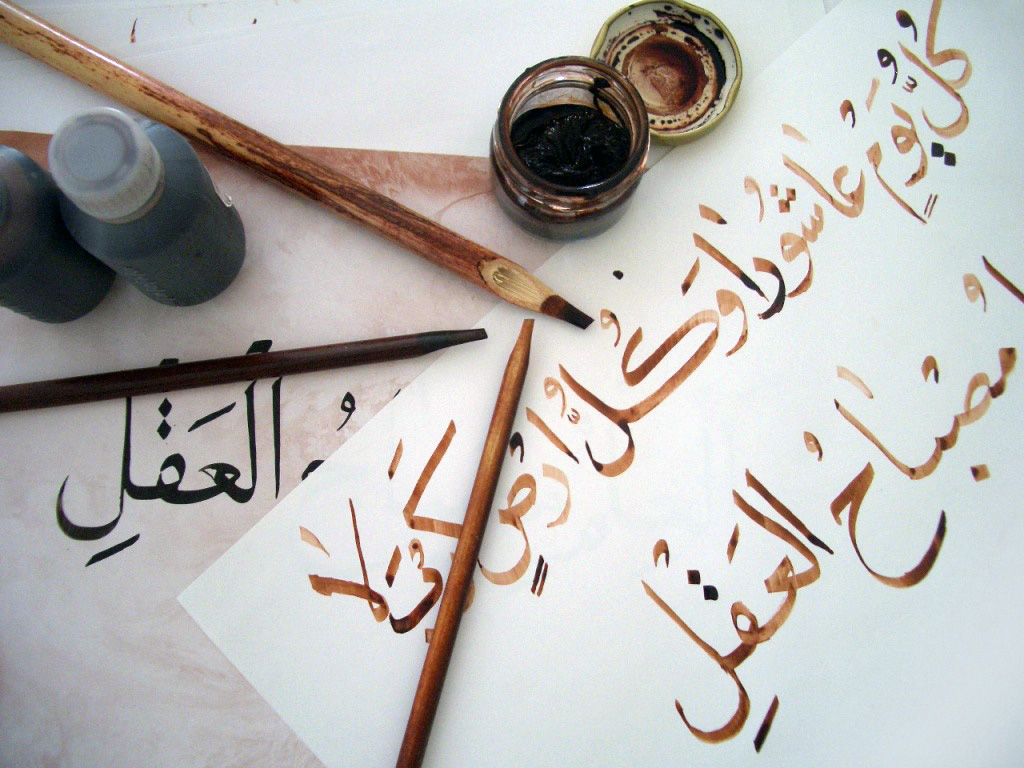
Arabic calligraphy

Arabic is a language spoken by more than 422 million people from the ocean to the Gulf, as the Arabs say. This includes Morocco, Mauritania and Western Sahara in the west, and extends to Iraq, the Gulf states and Somalia in the east. The official language of 26 countries, one of the six official languages of the United Nations. It is also the sacred language of over 1.7 billion Muslims around the world, and the language written by some of the greatest works of literature, science and history in the world. According to the teachings of Islam, classical Arabic is the language in which God chose to speak to mankind through Muhammad in the seventh century of the Christian era. It is the language of the Quran, the holy book of Islam. This is the language of Islamic and classical texts. Modern Arabic is the language of books, news broadcasts, poetry and political speeches throughout the Arab world, a language that every child in primary school learns to read and write, a diverse language of Arabic poetic traditions, the precise language of theologians and theologians of the Internet. Knowledge of Arabic provides an opportunity to connect with people throughout the Middle East, providing access to the richness and passion of the contemporary Arab world. Arabic is a way to explore nearly 14 centuries of one of the most sophisticated, diverse, and rich intellectual traditions in the world.

== Themes ==
Themes within Arab studies include:

=== Culture and society ===
Culture and society in the Arab world, from structures, institutions, art, poetry, letters, practices, and definitions of identity, based on anthropology, sociology, literature and religious studies.

=== Development ===
Development and political economy in the Arab world, focusing on economic and social development, education, humanitarian aid, and gender and environmental dimensions of development. This concentration is based on economic history, political economy, sociology and politics.

=== Politics ===
Contemporary political developments in the Arab world and the Middle East. The program covers the study of domineering, nationalism, local institutions, politics, war, peacemaking, identity, security policies and environmental security. It relies on comparative policies, international relations, history, science, political economy and development.

=== History of Arabs ===
Expansion of the Arab empire. Expansion under Muhammad, 622-632 Expansion during the Rashidun Caliphate, 632-661 Expansion during the Umayyad Caliphate, 661-750

To understand the history of Arabs provides the indispensable basis to understand all aspects of Arabs and its culture. Themes of special interest are:

- History of the Arabs
- Early Arab conquests

=== Theology ===
Kalam (علم الكلام) is one of the "religious sciences" of Islam. In Arabic, the word means "discussion" and refers to the Arabic tradition of seeking theological principles through dialectic. A scholar of kalam is referred to as a mutakallim.

- Arabic eschatology

=== Philosophy ===
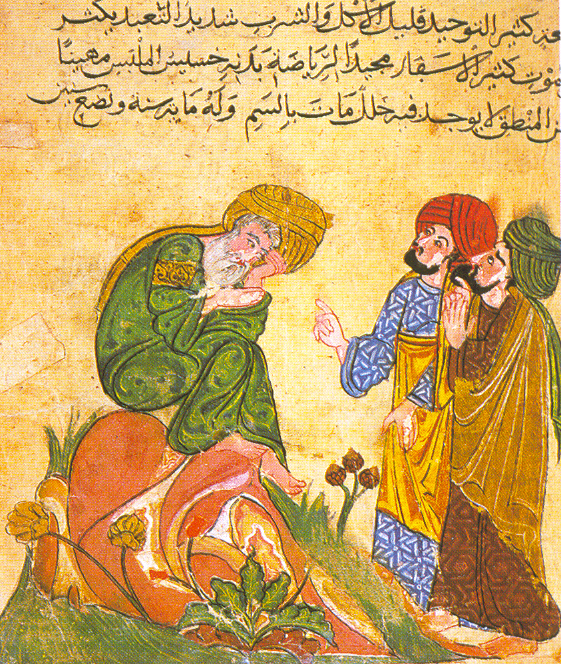
An Arabic manuscript from the 13th century depicting Socrates (Soqrāt) in discussion with his pupils

Arabic philosophy is a part of Arab studies. It is a longstanding attempt to create harmony between faith, reason or philosophy, and the religious teachings of Arabs. A Muslim engaged in this field is called an Arab philosopher. It is divided in fields like:

- Early Arabic philosophy
  - Avicennism
  - Averroism
- Modern Arabic philosophy
  - Transcendent theosophy
- List of Arab philosophers
- Illuminationist philosophy

=== Sciences ===
Arabic science is science in the context of traditional ideas of Arabs, including its ethics and prohibitions. An Arab engaged in this field is called a Muslim scientist. This is not the same as science as conducted by any Muslim in a secular context.

=== Literature ===
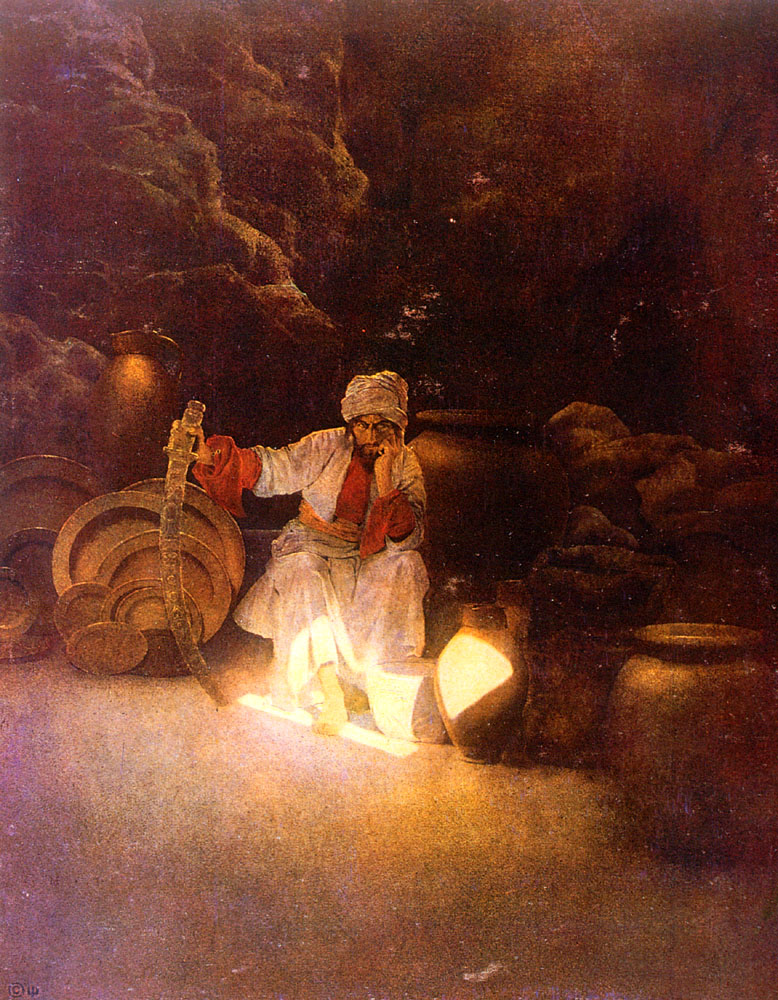
"Ali Baba" by Maxfield Parrish.

- Arabic literature
  - Arabic epic literature
- Arabic poetry

=== Architecture ===
Arabic architecture is the entire range of architecture that has evolved within Arab culture in the course of the history of Arabs. Hence the term encompasses religious buildings as well as secular ones, historic as well as modern expressions and the production of all places that have come under the varying levels of Islamic influence.

=== Art ===
- Arabic calligraphy
- Arabic pottery
- Arabic music

== Notable Arabists ==
- William Granara
- George Grigore
- Beatrice Gründler
- Gustave E. von Grunebaum
- Julián Ribera
- Charles Pierre Henri Rieu
- Andrew Rippin
- Maxime Rodinson
- Franz Rosenthal
- Cheryl Rubenberg
- Gordiy Sablukov
- W. Montgomery Watt
- Hans Wehr
- Michael Scott Weir
- Julius Wellhausen
- Abraham Wheelocke
- Franz Woepcke
- William Wright (orientalist)

== Organizations ==
- American Legation, Tangier
- Arabic language academies
- Center for Contemporary Arab Studies
- Centre for the Advanced Study of the Arab World
- College of Islamic and Arabic Studies, Afghanistan
- Middle East Centre for Arab Studies
- Middle East Forum
- Orient-Institut Beirut
- Pontifical Institute of Arab and Islamic Studies
- School of Arabic Studies

== Journals and magazines ==
- Jerusalem Studies in Arabic and Islam
- Journal of Arabic and Islamic Studies

== See also ==
- Arabist
- Arabization
- Islamic studies
- Middle Eastern studies
- Quranic studies
- Semitic studies
