= College of Islamic and Arabic Studies =

There are multiple institutions called the College of Islamic and Arabic Studies or the Institute of Islamic and Arabic Studies:

- Pontifical Institute of Arab and Islamic Studies, in Rome
- College of Islamic and Arabic Studies, Afghanistan, American intelligence analysts characterize this as a jihadist safe house
- Institute for Islamic Studies at the University of Toronto
