= Grindu =

Grindu may refer to:

- Grindu, Ialomița, Romania
- Grindu, Tulcea, Romania
