= Bakza Amin Khaki =

- باكزه أمين خاكي
- Born: 1936; Kirkuk, Iraq
- Died: 2003 (aged 66–67); Cairo, Egypt
- Education: University of Baghdad
- Spouse: Samir Osman Khuraiba

Bakza Amin Khaki (1936–2003) was an Iraqi poet.

== Early life and education ==
Bakza Amin Khaki was born in Baghdad to Arab parents, with her father descending from the Rabiah tribe. She received her early education in Baghdad and completed her high school in Kirkuk where her father served as an officer in the Iraqi Armed Forces. She graduated from the University of Baghdad with a degree in Arabic Literature and later earned a higher diploma in Community Development from the International Center in Saris al-Layan, Egypt.

== Career ==
She participated in numerous national demonstrations and was tried and arrested before the July Revolution. She was wounded in the Battle of the Bridge and was famously reported in Iraqi newspapers as "The Bridge Girl" before the July Revolution.

Khaki's poetry was published in major Iraqi and Kuwaiti newspapers as well as Egypt's Al-Ahram and the Egyptian Public Prosecution's magazine. Her poems were featured in books such as "معجم الشعراء" (Dictionary of Poets), "المرأة العراقية المعاصرة" (Contemporary Iraqi Women), and "شعراء بغداد" (Poets of Baghdad). Her poems were also published in Iraqi magazines like "Ahl al-Naft" (May 1953), "Al-Risala al-Jadida" (New Message), among others. She wrote a poetry collection titled "Al-Saqiya" (The Water Wheel) (manuscript) and reportedly had two other collections titled "Ghada Naltaqi" (We Meet Tomorrow) and "Alf Layla wa Layla" (A Thousand and One Nights).

She participated in several conferences:

- Asian-African Youth Conference, 1959, Cairo
- Community Development Conference, 1961, Beirut
- Arab Women's Union Conference, 1966, Cairo
- Arab Popular Forces Conference, 2001 and 2002, Baghdad

== Awards and honours ==
She received the "Majida" Medal for Poetic Creativity from the Iraqi Women's Union at the Arab Popular Forces Conference in 2002.

== Personal life ==
She obtained Egyptian citizenship through marriage to engineer Samir Osman Khuraiba (an international expert at the United Nations) and settled in Cairo. They had four children: three daughters (one a doctor, another an archaeologist, and the third an accountant) and a son, Suleiman Samir Osman Khuraiba, who became a legal advisor.
