= International Association of Arabic Dialectology =

The International Association of Arabic Dialectology (French: Association Internationale de Dialectologie Arabe, AIDA– International Association of Arabic Dialectology / الرابطة الدولية لدراسة اللهجات العربية) is an association of researchers in Arabic dialects, from all over the world.

== History ==
AIDA was founded in 1993, in Paris, by a group of distinguished Arabists. Their aim was to encourage and promote the study of various Arabic dialects.

AIDA has become an international association in this field of research. Scholars from around the world leverage this organisation to discuss and share aspect of Arabic dialectology, including dialects which have not been described yet, dialectal geography, phonology, morphology and syntax, code-switching, koiné language, pidgin, creole, the lexicon of Arabic dialects, dialectal atlases, comparative and diachronic studies, sociolinguistics, and the teaching of Arabic dialects.

== Conferences ==
AIDA organizes conferences that are held in well-known universities approximately every two years.

- 15th AIDA Conference – Malta 2024
- 14th AIDA Conference – Granada 2022
- 13th AIDA Conference – Kutaisi 2019
- 12th AIDA Conference – Marseille 2017
- 11th AIDA Conference – Bucharest 2015
- 10th AIDA Conference – Doha 2013
- 9th AIDA Conference – Pescara 2011
- 8th AIDA Conference – Colchester 2008
- 7th AIDA Conference – Vienna 2006
- 6th AIDA Conference – Hammamet 2004
- 5th AIDA Conference – Cádiz 2002
- 4th AIDA Conference – Marrakesh 2000
- 3rd AIDA Conference – Malta 1998
- 2nd AIDA Conference – Cambridge 1995
- 1st AIDA Conference – Paris 1993

== Executive Board ==
=== First Executive Board (1993–2004) ===
- Dominique Caubet (France) – president
- Abderrahim Youssi (Morocco) – vice-president
- Bruce Ingham (Great Britain) – vice-president
- Manwel Mifsud (Malta) – secretary
- Peter Behnstedt (Germany) – vice-secretary
- Martine Vanhove (France) – treasurer

=== Second Executive Board (2004–2015) ===
- Stephan Procházka (Austria) – president
- Abderrahim Youssi (2004–2013) / Karima Ziamari (2013–2015) (Morocco) – vice-president
- Rudolf de Jong (Netherlands) – general secretary
- Ángeles Vicente (Spain) – treasurer

=== Executive Board 2015–2022) ===
- George Grigore (University of Bucharest, Romania) – president
- Karima Ziamari (Moulay Ismail University, Meknes, Morocco) – vice-president
- Kristen Brustad (University of Texas at Austin, USA) – vice-president (until 2019)
- Christophe Pereira (INALCO, Paris, France) – vice-president (from 2019)
- Liesbeth Zack (University of Amsterdam, Netherlands) – general secretary
- Veronika Ritt-Benmimoun (University of Vienna, Austria) – treasurer

=== Executive Board (as of 30 June 2022, Granada) ===
- George Grigore (University of Bucharest, Romania) – president
- Karima Ziamari (Moulay Ismail University, Meknes, Morocco) – vice-president
- Christophe Pereira (INALCO, Paris, France) – vice-president
- Bettina Leitner (University of Vienna, Austria) – general secretary
- Simone Bettega (University of Turin, Italy) – treasurer

== Honours ==
Albert Borg, one of the first members of AIDA, was awarded the gold medal of 'Ġieħ l-Akkademja tal-Malti' for his outstanding work in the development of the Maltese language.
