= George Grigore =

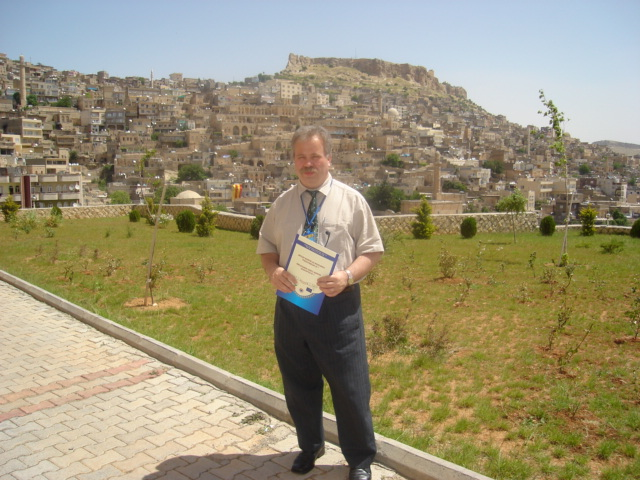
- George Grigore in Mardin, 2006
- Born: George Grigore; 2 February 1958 (age 68); Grindu, Romania
- Occupations: Writer, essayist, translator, professor

George Grigore or Gheorghe Grigore (born 2 February 1958) is a Romanian writer, essayist, translator, professor and researcher in Middle Eastern studies.

== Biography ==
George Grigore was born in the village of Grindu, Ialomița (southeastern Romania), on 2 February 1958. In 1983, he graduated from the Faculty of Foreign Languages and Literatures of the University of Bucharest. In 1997, he earned a Ph.D. from the same university, with a dissertation titled Some Questions Regarding the Translation of the Qur’an into Romanian.

In 2000, as an editor-translator at Kriterion Publishing House Editura Kriterion, he launched the Bibliotheca Islamica collection, where he has published his own translations of numerous works fundamental to Islamic culture, and works of other translators. His translation of the Qur’an was most noteworthy and published in several editions, including a bilingual one, printed in Istanbul, in 2003. He has published studies on the Qur’an and Islam, as well as on the Arabic dialects, with a focus on the dialects of Baghdad and Mardin. He has also undertaken research in Kurdish Studies.

Since 2001, Grigore has been the associate editor of Romano-Arabica, the academic review published by the Centre of Arabic Studies at the University of Bucharest.

Grigore has published translations of Romanian literature into Arabic, including The Mould, by the Romanian playwright Marin Sorescu (Al-Mağrā, Baghdad) and The Tyranny of Dream, by the Romanian poet Carolina Ilica (Taghyān al-Hulm, Lebanon). His anthology of Romanian poetry translated into Arabic (Kāna yağibu, Baghdad) has been awarded a prize by the Iraqi Writers Union.

In addition to lecturing at the University of Bucharest, Grigore has written practical books for students of Arabic, such as dictionaries, a conversation guide, and a manual of orthography and calligraphy.

In 2023, he was awarded the Sheykh Hamad pentru Traducere și Înțelegere Internațională (Sheykh Hamad award for translation and international understanding), for the body of his translation work.

== Affiliations ==
- Member of the International Association of Arabic Dialectology
- Member of the Romanian Association for Religious Studies
- Member of the Writers' Union of Romania
- Honorary Member of the Iraqi Writers' Union
- Member of the Centre of Arabic Studies, University of Bucharest
- Ambassador of Alliance of Civilizations for Romania

== List of works and translations published (selection) ==
- L’arabe parlé à Mardin. Monographie d'un parler arabe "périphérique", Editura Universitatii din Bucuresti, 2007
- Problematica traducerii Coranului în limba română (Questions Regarding the Translation of the Qur’an into Romanian), Ararat, 1997
- Poveşti irakiene (Iraqi Tales), Coresi, 1993
- Slujitorii Diavolului; Cartea Neagră, Cartea Dezvăluirii (Worshippers of the Devil. The Black Book, The Book of Revelation), Călin, 1994
- Poporul kurd – file de istorie (The Kurdish People. Pages of History), Interprint, 1997
- Dicţionar Arab-român (Arabic-Romanian Dictionary), Teora, 1998
- Coranul (The Qur’an), Editura Kriterion, 2000; 2002; Herald, 2005
- Al-Ghazali, Firida luminilor (The Niche of Lights), Kriterion, 2001
- Ibn Tufayl, Hayy bin Yaqzan, Kriterion, 2001
- Ibn Ruşd, Cuvânt hotărâtor (Ibn Rushd – The Decisive Word), Kriterion, 2001
- Badiuzzaman Said Nursi, Cuvinte [Words], Nesıl Yayınları, Istanbul, 2002
- Ibn 'Arabi, Geneza cercurilor [The Genesis of Circles], Kriterion, 2003
- Coranul [The Qur’an – bilingual edition, Romanian-Arabic], Çağrı Yayınları, Istanbul, 2003
- Ochiul lăuntric – perspective islamice asupra divinităţii [The Inner Eye. Islamic Perspectives on Divinity], Herald, 2005
- ‘Ali bin Abi Talib, Nahj al-Balagha / Calea vorbirii alese (Peak of Eloquence), Kriterion, 2008
- Mahmoud Darwish, Sunt arab. Poeme (I am Arab. Poems). Kriterion, 2009
- Ibn Sīnā (Avicenna), The Book of Definitions (trilingual edition: Arabic, Romanian, Latin). Translation from the Arabic language, analysis and bibliography by George Grigore. Notes and comments by George Grigore, Alexander Baumgarten, Paula Tomi and Mădălina Pantea. Chronological table by Gabriel Bițună. Critical transcription of the Latin version of the treaty and the comments of Andrea Alpago (1546), along with the translation of the comments in the Romanian language, by Alexander Baumgarten. Iași: Polirom Publishing House, Medieval Library Series, 2012.
