= School of Arabic Studies =

Spanish research institute

Coordinates: 37.180848°N 3.588467°W

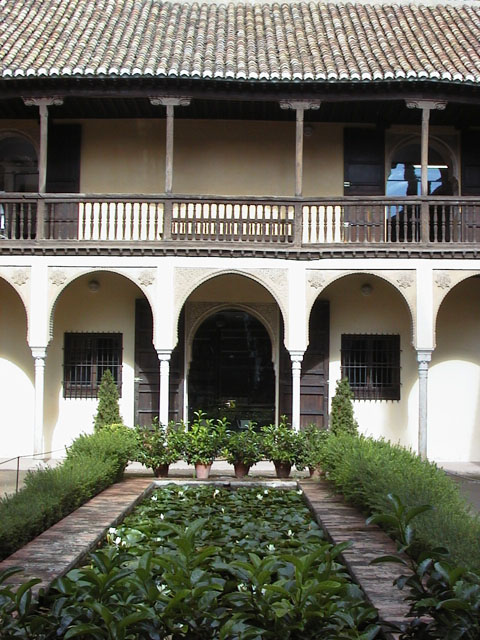
School of Arabic Studies.

The School of Arabic Studies (in Spanish Escuela de Estudios Árabes, EEA) is a research Institute of the Spanish National Research Council (Consejo Superior de Investigaciones Científicas, CSIC) with headquarters at the Houses of the Chapiz in Granada.

This building, declared an Object of Cultural Interest according to Spanish legislation, is made up of two former Morisco houses located in the well-known Granada district of Albaicín. The School was born in 1932, when the Schools of Arabic Studies of Madrid and Granada were created with the aim of "protecting and encouraging Arabic studies in Spain". In its early stages, the Granada School was entitled to teach Arabic language and civilization, Hebrew language, Muslim cultural and political history, Islamic law and institutions, Arabic dialectology, art and archaeology. In 1939, after the Spanish Civil War, the School became a part of the newly created Spanish National Research Council and, consequently, it was devoted to research according to the guidelines of this institution. The School of Arabic Studies of Granada is nowadays the only Institute that keeps the original name, after the School of Madrid took other names, and the only CSIC Institute entirely devoted to Arabic studies. The School has a sole department, called "Department of Arabic Studies", which is made up of four research groups dealing with history of al-Andalus, Arabic historiography, medieval archaeology, Islamic architecture, natural science in al-Andalus, Arabic biographical literature, Islamic law, and edition and translation of Arabic texts.
