= Maria Petre =

Romanian politician and economist

Maria Petre (born August 15, 1951) is a Romanian politician and economist, member of the Democratic Party (PD), part of the European People's Party–European Democrats. A representative to the Senate for Ialomița County, she became a Member of the European Parliament on January 1, 2007 with the Romania's accession to the European Union.

Born in Grindu, Petre is a graduate of the Academy of Economic Studies in Bucharest. She later specialized in public administration and commerce, and took additional training courses in the United Kingdom, United States and Denmark. In 1975-1983, she worked as an economist for the Ialomiţa County Council, moving on to a similar position for a construction enterprise in the area. in 1986, she became a director at the County Council, in which capacity she served until after the Romanian Revolution of 1989.

In 1990, Petre became a director for the Ialomiţa Prefecture representing the National Salvation Front (FSN), and its vice president in 1992-2000. She followed the FSN wing led by Petre Roman into their split, and became a member of the newly formed PD. She was the PD's vice president for Ialomița (1992), becoming the branch's secretary in 2001, and its president in 2003. She was first elected to the Senate during the 2000 suffrage, being reelected in the 2004 suffrage. Petre was a secretary of the Senate Committee for Public Administration and Territorial Improvement, and member of the Committee for Equal Opportunities for Men and Women.
