= Rabiah =

Rabiah is a surname and a given name. Notable people with the name include:

- Rabiah ibn Kab, companion of Muhammad
- Ayyash ibn Abi Rabiah, companion of Muhammad
- Utbah ibn Rabi'ah (c.563–624), Quraish leader
- Rabiah ibn Mudhar, 6th-century Jewish king in present-day Yemen
- Abd ar-Rahman ibn Rabiah, 7th-century caliphate general
- Salman ibn Rabiah (died 650), military governor of Armenia
- Rabiah Hutchinson (born 1954), Australian Islamic leader
- Fouad Mahmoud al Rabiah (born 1959), a Kuwaiti national imprisoned at Guantanamo Bay
- Robert Rabiah, Australian film actor and writer
- Tawfig AlRabiah, Saudi health minister

== See also ==
- Rabia (disambiguation)
- Al-Rabiaa, a village in northwestern Syria
- Rabieh, a suburb of Beirut
- Rabiah, the fictional setting of Arabian Nights, the first Magic: The Gathering expansion
