= Ashrafuddin Ahmad Chowdhury =

Bengali politician (1894–1976)

- আশরাফউদ্দীন আহমদ চৌধুরী

General Secretary of Bengal Province Congress
- In office 1937–1942

Member of the East Bengal Legislative Assembly
- In office 1954–1955
- Monarch: Elizabeth II
- Governor-General: Ghulam Muhammad
- Prime Minister: Mohammad Ali Bogra

Education Minister of Pakistan
- In office 1954–1955

Personal details
- Born: 1894 Batagram, Tipperah District; Bengal Presidency
- Died: 25 March 1976 (aged 81–82) Bangladesh
- Party: All India National Congress; Nizam-e-Islam Party
- Children: Rabeya Chowdhury
- Education: Calcutta University

Ashrafuddin Ahmad Chowdhury (Bengali: আশরাফউদ্দীন আহমদ চৌধুরী; 1894 – 25 March 1976) was a Bengali politician who had served as general secretary of the Congress Party's Bengal branch, member of the East Bengal Legislative Assembly and later as the education minister of Pakistan. He was an advocate of Huseyn Shaheed Suhrawardy's United Bengal proposal.

== Early life ==
Chowdhury was born in 1894, into a well-reputed Bengali Muslim family of zamindars in Batagram, Tipperah District, Bengal Presidency (now Comilla District, Bangladesh). He was a son of Tofazzal Ahmad Chowdhury, alias Anu Mia, an influential zamindar of that time. Chowdhury moved to Calcutta for his education, where he studied at the Hare School and then at the St. Xavier's Collegiate School. He completed his bachelor's degree from Rajshahi College in North Bengal and then completed law school at the Calcutta University in 1919.

He married Razia Khatoon in 1913. They had a son and three daughters.

== Career ==
Chowdhury was a prominent leader in the anti-British Indian independence movement. He was involved in the Khilafat Movement and Non-cooperation movement as an activist and the leader of the All India National Congress's Bengal branch. He became a leader of the Tippera Krishak Samiti's moderate side. He was arrested numerous times and served several terms of imprisonment, including in 1925 for six months, in 1927 for a year, and in 1939 for six years. His wife died in 1935.

From 1937 to 1941, he was the general secretary of the Bengal Provincial Congress Committee during the presidency of Subhash Chandra Bose. He was one of the closest allies of Bose and played an instrumental role in organising Bengal Congress at that time. Chowdhury also played a vital role in formation of Forward Bloc with Bose and was a vital member in the founding Working Committee of All India Forward Bloc, which was the party's highest forum for whole India. He supported Indian nationalism and Hindu-Muslim unity. He was also the first non-British chairman of the District Board of Tipperah (Comilla) and was a member of the Bengal Legislative Assembly.

In the 1940s, he joined the Nikhil Banga Jamiat-i-Ulama-i-Hind. Chowdhury stood as a candidate of the Nizam-e-Islam Party as part of the United Front alliance during the 1954 East Bengal Legislative Assembly elections, in which he gained a seat in his home constituency of Comilla. In 1954, he became the minister of education during the cabinet of A. K. Fazlul Huq, he became education minister again during the cabinet of Abu Hussain Sarkar.

== Death and legacy ==
Chowdhury died on 25 March 1976 in Bangladesh. One of his daughters, Rabeya Chowdhury, is a prominent politician of the Bangladesh Nationalist Party.
