= Abu Walid al-Masri =

Egyptian journalist and al-Qaeda member (1945–2025)

Mustafa Hamid (Arabic: مصطفى حامد; March 1945 – December 2025), also known as Abu Walid al-Masri (Arabic: أبو وليد المصري) and Hashim al-Makki (Arabic: هاشم المكّي), was an Egyptian journalist who in the 1980s fought as an Islamic jihad volunteer during the Soviet–Afghan War. He is reported to have been an al-Qaeda advisor and taught at the Al Farouq training camp in the 1990s. He served as a bureau chief in Afghanistan for Al Jazeera from 1998 to 2001, before leaving for Iran.

Hamid was arrested in 2003 and placed under house arrest for eight years. He was released in 2011 and returned to Egypt after its revolution.

== Background ==
Mustafa Hamid was born in March 1945 in the city of Alexandria, in the then Kingdom of Egypt. He became a journalist. While living in Kabul, Afghanistan, Mustafa Hamid married Rabiah Hutchinson, an Australian convert. In Kabul, Hutchinson was regarded for her medical knowledge. His daughter Asma is married to Al-Qaeda's suspected leader Saif al-Adel, with whom she has five children. A son of his, Khalid Mustafa Hamid, was killed in 1988 at 14 years old in the Paktia province of Afghanistan, as a result of a detonation of unexploded ordnance at the Jawar military training base for Afghan Arabs, which had been left there as a result of a Soviet attack on the base a few years prior.

On 29 December 2025, it was announced that Hamid had died at the age of 80.

== Activities ==
After the Soviets invaded Afghanistan, at the age of nearly 40, he went there to fight as an Islamic jihad volunteer, along with many other men from the Mideast, who became known as the "Afghan Arabs". During the 1980s, the United States provided some support to the mujahideen resistance to the Soviet Union, primarily through the CIA. Hamid became known by his kunya as Abu Walid al-Masri.

At the beginning of the Soviet–Afghan War, he met Jalaluddin Haqqani in 1979 and later worked with him from 1980 until 1992. In 1986 he met Ayman al-Zawahiri in Peshawar. In 1988 he met Osama bin Laden and remained friends with him until his 2011 death. In 1993, he went to Khost where he lived and training mujahideen fighters.

During the Soviet–Afghan War, al Masri also worked as a journalist for the Arabic-language Al Ettihad news. He reportedly taught as a senior advisor at the Al Farouq training camp for a time in the mid 1990s. This was during the period when ethnic groups and warlords competed for power in Afghanistan after the withdrawal of the Soviet Union. By 1996, the Taliban emerged in control of much of the country. Al-Masri has been described as a leader or advisor to al-Qaeda, based in Afghanistan by then and associated with the Farouq camp, although he has disclaimed this.

In 1996, he traveled to Khartoum, Sudan and lived there with bin Laden for a few months before they returned to Jalalabad in Afghanistan. In 1997, he was among the first to pledge allegiance to Mullah Omar as Amir al-Mu'minin.

From 1998 to 2001, during the latter years of the Taliban's rule in Afghanistan, al Masri served as the bureau chief of Al Jazeera in Kandahar. After the attacks of September 11 in the United States, Afghanistan was attacked by American-led forces, including the Afghan Northern Alliance, during Operation Enduring Freedom beginning in the fall of 2001.

Hamid left the Afghan city of Herat and crossed over into Iran. He was taken into custody by police, and sentenced to house arrest. He spent much of the next decade in this detention.

On December 31, 2010, Hamid posted a series of letters online, introducing them as "five articles, full of frankness and ardor, sent to me by one of the brothers in jihad, an old comrade in arms from Afghanistan." These are thought to have been written by the al Qaeda commander Saif al-Adel. The letters discuss the current jihad led by the Taliban in Afghanistan, contain constructive criticisms of the Mujahideen and Islamic Scholars and argue that the Jihadist movement needs to acknowledge and learn from its mistakes. An additional five letters, allegedly from Saif al-Adel, were posted on 23 March 2011, covering the Arab Spring uprisings.

In 2011, Hamid was released by Iran. He returned to Egypt after the 2011 Egyptian revolution. There he was interviewed by Leah Farrall, an Australian counterterrorism scholar, who published an article about him in Atlantic in 2011, which also described his view of Iran's politics in Afghanistan.

In 2015 Hamid and Farrall published The Arabs at War in Afghanistan.

From 2009, Hamid ran a website called 'Mafa'. After leaving Qatar in 2016 he returned to living in Tehran, Iran. He was prominent in discussing and exposing the relationship al-Qaeda maintained with Iran, saying "Of course there are relations between Iran and al-Qaeda... All this called for good neighborly relations and cooperation with Iran to resolve misunderstandings".
