= Tippera Krishak Samiti =

Peasant organization

Tippera Krishak Samiti (ত্রিপুরা কৃষক সমিতি) was a specially organised peasant organization comprising Greater Comilla, Comilla, Chandpur, Lakshmipur, Noakhali and Brahmanbaria districts. It was founded by Maulvi Emdadul Haque, a member of the Bengal Legislative Council in 1919 .

== Structure ==
Tippera Krishak Samiti was initially formed as an organization to strengthen rural co-operation and eventually became a radical reformist organization run by the local leftist politicians of the Provincial Congress of Bengal. The period of the Great Depression from 1929 to 1935 was a very distressing day for farmers. Then the organization was restructured under the leadership of Anti-British sentiment Member Mukhlesur Rahman, Kamini Kumar Dutta and Abdul Malek.

== Naming ==
Kaminikumar Dutta a prominent member of Comilla's advocacy community and leader of the left-wing organization, was the chief organizer of the association and fundraiser. He gave wise advice to the committee on theoretical matters. In order to widen the political and geographical basis of the then society, the association was renamed in 5 years. However, after being named, to its supporters, it was known as the Tripura Farmers' Association.

== Politics ==
The change in the name of the Tripura Farmers' Association did not make it into an inter-district party, but the party became so strong that in the general election of 5, the society contested in the election of its own candidate in all the four seats in Tripura district. Of these, it won 5 seats. The winners were able to defeat the elite candidates from the Congress, Muslim League and Krishak Praja Party by a huge margin.

== Socialism influence ==
In the context of communal politics of the time, the social influence of society gradually became narrow. Periodically, a rift broke out within the party and split between the reformist and moderate groups. Yakub Ali led the reformist section and Ashrafuddin Ahmad Chowdhury led the moderate party.

== Extinction ==
With the spread of Muslim nationalism in the 1940s, the Left-backed Tripura peasant associations gradually became smaller and many more headed for extinction. The organization, once known as Tripura, became the stronghold of the Samiti so small that all major parties, including the Muslim League, tried to mobilize it for their own sake. In the General Election of 9, the candidates of the Muslim League occupied all the seats in the Tripura region. On the other hand, in the northern and northeastern districts of Bengal, there was virtually no participation of the Tripura Farmers' Association in the Tebhaga Movement, held from 1946 to 1947.
