= Saif al-Adel =

De facto leader of al-Qaeda since 2022

- سيف العدل
- Al-Adel at an Afghan jihadist camp in 2000

3rd General Emir of al-Qaeda (Note: According to a United Nations report.)
- De facto
- Assumed office 1 August 2022
- Preceded by: Ayman al-Zawahiri (as General Emir)

Personal details
- Born: Mohamed Salah al-Din al-Halim Zaidan; 11 April 1960 (age 66) or 11 April 1963 (age 63) Monufia Governorate, United Arab Republic
- Spouse: Asma
- Relations: Abu Walid al-Masri (father-in-law); Rabiah Hutchinson (mother-in-law); Khaled Cheikho (brother-in-law)
- Children: 5
- Other names: Ibrahim al-Madani; Muhammad Ibrahim al-Makkawi (alleged pseudonym); Omar al-Sumali; Salim al-Sharif
- Military career
- Allegiance: Egypt (1976–1987); Maktab al-Khidamat (1988); Al-Qaeda (1988–present)
- Service years: 1976–present
- Rank: Colonel (before 1988); Emir (de facto) (2022–present)
- Conflicts: Soviet–Afghan War; Somali Civil War; Battle of Mogadishu; War on terror; Afghan War

Mohamed Salah al-Din al-Halim Zaidan (Arabic: محمد صلاح الدين الحليم زيدان; born 11 April 1960/1963), commonly known by his nom de guerre Saif al-Adel (Arabic: سيف العدل, lit. 'sword of justice'), is an Egyptian Islamic militant who is the de facto leader of al-Qaeda. Previously an Egyptian Army officer, al-Adel fought the Soviets as an Afghan Arab before becoming a founding member of al-Qaeda. He is a member of al-Qaeda's Majlis al-Shura and has headed the organization's military committee since the death of Mohammad Atef in 2001. It is alleged (by unconfirmed accounts from various intelligence agencies) that as of 2023 he is living in Iran along with several other senior members of the group, though this remains unproven.

Once a colonel in Egypt's El-Sa'ka Forces during the 1980s, the Egyptian military expelled al-Adel in 1987 and arrested him alongside thousands of Islamists amid allegations of attempting to rebuild the Egyptian Islamic Jihad and plans to topple Hosni Mubarak. The charges were dismissed, though al-Adel soon left Egypt for Afghanistan, joining Afghan Arab mujahideen resisting the Soviet invasion under the banner of al-Qaeda forerunner Maktab al-Khidamat in 1988. al-Adel would go on to become the chief of newly formed al-Qaeda's media department, and was involved in the production of Osama bin Laden's videos, which quickly found audiences worldwide. By the early nineties, al-Adel is thought to have then traveled to southern Lebanon with Abu Talha al-Sudani, Saif al-Islam al-Masri, Abu Ja`far al-Masri, and Abu Salim al-Masri, where they trained alongside Hezbollah al-Hejaz. Sometime after, al-Adel became a member of the AQ Shura council, and by 1992 had become a member of its military committee, then headed by Mohammad Atef. He has provided military and intelligence training to members of al-Qaeda and Egyptian Islamic Jihad in Afghanistan, Pakistan, and Sudan, and to anti-American Somali tribes. Shifting to Khartoum in 1992, al-Adel taught militant recruits how to handle explosives. It is possible that his trainees included Somalis who participated in the first Battle of Mogadishu in 1993. Al-Adel also established the al-Qaeda training facility at Ras Kamboni in Somalia near the Kenyan border.

The 9/11 Commission Report states that in July 2001, three senior AQ Shura council members including al-Adel, Saeed al-Masri, and Mahfouz Ould al-Walid opposed bin Laden and Ayman al-Zawahiri's decision to execute the September 11 attacks. Following the subsequent United States invasion of Afghanistan, al-Adel was given secret asylum in Iran during which he was monitored by the Islamic Revolutionary Guard Corps (IRGC). In 2015, al-Qaeda made a deal with the IRGC's Qods Force to return Saif to Afghanistan, though he reportedly refused, stating a preference for maintaining Iran as his base of activities. al-Adel is currently under indictment in the United States, with charges related to his alleged role in the 1998 US Embassy bombings in Tanzania and Kenya.

Before Zawahiri's killing in 2022, Saif al-Adel had become the effective micro-manager of field commanders of AQ branches in Somalia, Yemen and Syria from his communication base in Iran. A 2023 United Nations report concluded that al-Adel had been named de facto leader of al-Qaeda but that he had not been formally proclaimed as its emir due to "political sensitives" of the Taliban government in acknowledging the killing of Zawahiri in Kabul and the "theological and operational" challenges posed by location of al-Adel in Shia-led Iran. With the death of Zawahiri, Saif al-Adel is one of al-Qaeda's few surviving founding members. al-Adel has been tightening his grip over the AQ branches, promoting a loyalist base of field commanders and increasing his influence in the group's branch in the Arabian Peninsula, known as AQAP, while waiting to be officially declared emir. Saif has made attempts to shift AQ's central command to Yemen, a country where the group has long had a branch.

== Early life ==
External image
- The FBI Most Wanted Terrorists entry for Saif al-Adel contains a photo of him in Tehran in 2012 alongside Abu Muhammad al-Masri (killed 2020) and Abu Khayr al-Masri (killed 2017).

Al-Adel was born around 1960 (the FBI claims 11 April), joining the Egyptian Armed Forces around 1976 and became a colonel in the El-Sa'ka Forces by the 1980s as an explosives expert, possibly being trained in the Soviet Union. He fled Egypt in 1988 and made his way to Afghanistan, joining the relatively small but well-funded (and mainly Egyptian and Saudi) Maktab Al-Khidamat, the forerunner to what would become Al-Qaeda. He became an explosives trainer for new recruits and would stay in Afghanistan after the war to train members of the newly formed Taliban. The late emir of Somali Al-Qaeda affiliate Al-Shabaab, Ahmed Godane, stated that Al-Adel and future Al-Qaeda in Saudi Arabia leader Yusuf Al-Ayiri played an important role in the 1993 Battle of Mogadishu by providing training and participating in the battle directly against American forces. Al-Adel would later join Osama bin Laden in Sudan after 1994.

=== Real identity ===
Until 2012, there was much dispute over Al-Adel's real name and identity. According to the University of Exeter professor Omar Ashour, the FBI's previous information on Al-Adel had confused the biographies of two different members of Al-Qaeda; 'Mohamed Salah Al-Din Al-Halim Zidane' and 'Muhammad Ibrahim Al-Makkawi'. Ashour states that imagery of Al-Adel in FBI "Most Wanted List" depicts Zidane and asserts that, like Makkawi, Zidane was also a colonel of the Egyptian military. As of present, most intelligence agencies and analysts today confirm that Al-Adel's real identity is that of Zidane's. Makkawi was arrested by the Egyptian police on 29 February 2012 upon arrival at Cairo Airport from Pakistan. During interrogation, Makkawi denied that he was Al-Adel and claimed that he had splintered his affiliation with the organization in 1989. By the time of his arrest, Makkawi had been married in Pakistan and had a family there, and was reportedly distressed to see his name being promoted under the image of Saif Al-Adel. An Egyptian lawyer asserted that Makkawi was an Egyptian military officer who was arrested in the 1980s over ties to jihadist organizations. He later escaped to Afghanistan and became a member of Al-Qaeda. However, the lawyer also claimed that Makkawi was a different person from Saif Al-Adel and had severed ties with Al-Qaeda long ago. The real Al-Adel, currently based in Iran, was a supervisor of Bin Laden's personal security and has been described as an "experienced professional soldier" within the jihadist movement. Noman Benotman, a former leader of the Al-Qaeda-linked Libyan Islamic Fighting Group, stated that he had met both Makkawi and Al-Adel. Some analysts believe that Al-Adel may have once used Makkawi's name as an alias.

== Militant connections ==
=== Embassy bombings ===
Several months before the 1998 embassy bombings, Al-Adel was helping Osama bin Laden move his followers from Najim Jihad to Tarnak Farms. The group had begrudgingly agreed to care for the troublesome Canadian 16-year-old, Abdurahman Khadr, since his father was away and his mother couldn't control his drinking, smoking and violent outbursts. However, while they were in Kabul, bin Laden asked Adel to take Abdurahman to the bus station and send him back to his family's home.

In approximately 2000, Adel was living in the Karte Parwan district of Kabul. On the local walkie-talkie communications in the city, he was identified as #1. On 9 September 2001, Adel was approached by Feroz Ali Abbasi, who said he was so impressed by the killing of Ahmed Shah Massoud that he wanted to volunteer for something similar.

The entire crew of the tank escaped. Shrapnel hit Khalid in the head, paralyzing the left side of his body. He recovered after four months, except for a slight effect in his left hand.

— Saif al-Adl describing November 2001 American attack against militant tank near Kandahar

In early November 2001, the Taliban government announced they were bestowing official Afghan citizenship on Adel, as well as Bin Laden, Zawahiri, Mohammed Atef, and Shaykh Asim Abdulrahman. During the American bombardment of Kandahar, Adel was present and witnessed the deaths of Abu-Ali Al-Yafi'i and his wife, Abu-Usamah Al-Ta'zi with his wife and two children, the wife of Rayyan Al-Ta'zi, the wife of Abu-Usamah Al-Kini, and the wife of Al-Barra Al-Hijazi who was arrested in Morocco before the Casablanca bombings.

On 18 November, Adel was working with Abu-Muhammad Al-Abyad, Abd-Al-Rahman Al-Masri, Abu-Usamah Al-Filastini, Abu-Husayn Al-Masri and Faruq Al-Suri; all of whom were staying in his empty house with him at night. In the early morning hours of 19 November, he woke them up just minutes before the Al-Wafa charity building was bombed. Phoning friends in the area, he learned that Abdul Wahid had been killed in the explosion. He later learned that Asim Al-Yamani, from Al Farouq training camp, and the elderly Abu-Abd-Al-Rahman Al-Abiy had run to the charity's headquarters and begun rescuing survivors and pulling out the dead bodies. The pair agreed the area was not safe, and sent their women to the smaller villages, while they used their two cars to try and pack up their house's contents. An American jet bombed the pair, killing Al-Yamani and wounding Al-Abiy.

As it was the third day of Ramadan, the group in Adel's house began to prepare and eat Suhoor, but were interrupted by a cruise missile striking 100 metres away, destroying an empty house belonging to an Afghan Arab family, and a Taliban barracks. They gathered their belongings and quickly left, fearing another strike. Adel went to the hospital, where he visited the wounded Al-Abiy, and arranged for him to be transferred to a hospital in Pakistan.

After Adel was told by Abu Ali Al-Suri that the American aircraft had machinegunned women leaving the city on the road to Banjway, Adel said that he would send aid. A convoy of 4–6 Corolla Fielders set out to Banjway, followed closely by American helicopters. The Americans attacked the lead vehicle, killing Abu-Ali Al-Yafi'i, his wife, four women, and two children, and the second vehicle, killing Suraqah Al-Yamani and Hamzah Al-Suri. Abu-Ali Al-Maliki quickly veered off the road with the third vehicle, turning off his headlights, and drove into the mountains, escaping the attack.

Since Al-Qaeda's military chief Mohammed Atef was killed in 2001, journalists reported that Adel was likely his successor in that role.

=== Pearl kidnapping ===
Since 2011, he has been connected with the kidnapping of Daniel Pearl in 2002.

=== 2003 Riyadh bombing ===
Al-Adel and Saad bin Laden were implicated in the 12 May 2003 suicide bombing in Riyadh, Saudi Arabia. In May 2003, then-State Department official Ryan Crocker provided information on the upcoming attack to Iranian officials, who apparently took no action. However, according to Saad's family and an interrogation of former Al-Qaeda spokesman Sulaiman Abu Ghaith, Saad and Al-Adel were being held prisoner in Iran when the attack took place. In 2004, he published a "terrorist manual" entitled The Base of the Vanguard, an Arabic pun on the phrases Al-Qaeda ("the base") and the Vanguards of Conquest.

Al-Adel was a key source in a 2005 book on Al-Qaeda's global strategy by the journalist Fouad Hussein.

Al-Adel is a leader of Al-Qaeda in Iran, according to American security expert Seth Jones.

== Current location ==
External image
- image from FBI in 2011 (Saif al-Adel in Iran)

According to multiple Western news agencies, Saif Al-Adel was based in Iran since the 2000s. Following the U.S. invasion of Afghanistan, Saif Al-Adel was given secret asylum in Iran, during which he was monitored by the IRGC. As an ideologue who favoured engagement with Iran to jointly promote anti-American revolutions in the region, this and the constant US-led accusations of Iran and Al-Qaeda's cooperation are seen as an attempt to unite their enemies into one entity, even going as far as to claim that Al-Adel had a friendship with the commander of the IRGC's Quds Force, Qassem Soleimani, when Al-Qaeda-affiliated forces in Syria (such as Hurras al-Din, the Nusra Front, Jama'at Ansar al-Islam, and the Khorasan group) and Iraq (such as Al-Qaeda in Iraq/Islamic State of Iraq and Jama'at Ansar al-Islam) were actively fighting forces under his command in Syria.

Adel has been on the FBI's list of Most Wanted Terrorists since its inception in 2001. The State Department's Rewards for Justice Program is offering up to US$10 million for information on his location.

In late 2001, Adel fled Afghanistan to Iran and was detained under house arrest in Tehran. Later reports indicated that he was released by Iran in March 2010 in exchange for the release of Heshmatollah Attarzadeh, an Iranian diplomat kidnapped in November 2008, and made his way to northern Pakistan. Although Mahfouz Ould Al-Walid was reported killed in a January 2002 American airstrike, it was later revealed that he fled to Iran with Adel.

In October 2010, Der Spiegel reported that Adel was in the Waziristan region in the Federally Administered Tribal Areas between Northwest Frontier Province, Pakistan and Afghanistan.

In July 2011, it was reported that Adel returned to Iran.

Egyptian authorities reported in 2012 that he was arrested at the Cairo International Airport upon his return to Egypt from Pakistan via the United Arab Emirates. However, according to Ghaith, Al-Adel never left Iran and was still under house arrest when Ghaith was captured in 2013.

On 20 September 2015, Al Arabiya reported that Al-Adel and four other captives were part of a prisoner exchange Iranian authorities made with AQAP in Yemen.

On 16 March 2016, a Twitter account affiliated with Al-Qaeda implicated Al-Adel as having been sent to aid against the Russian intervention in the Syrian Civil War. A similar report also placed Al-Adel as having been sent to Syria as an emissary on behalf of Al-Qaeda emir Ayman Al-Zawahiri. However, Long War Journal reported that Al-Adel is still residing in Iran.

Due to the publication of an article by Al-Qaeda media Global Islamic Media Front Adel's location is speculated to have moved to Afghanistan following the Taliban takeover in 2021, since the article included a lot of praise for the newly established emirate which Adel urged all Muslims to migrate to.

On 2 August 2022, a day after it was reported that Al-Zawahiri was killed in a U.S. drone strike, Al-Adel was still reported to be in Iran, which also complicated his ability to succeed Al-Zawahiri as Al-Qaeda's leader. NPR journalist Colin P. Clarke described Al-Adel's legal status in Iran as "semi-house arrest." In February 2023, a report from the United Nations, based on member state intelligence, concluded that de facto leadership of Al-Qaeda had passed to Saif Al-Adel.

== Writings ==
We say to those who want a quick victory, that this type of war waged by
the Mujahideen employs a strategy of the long-breath and the attrition and
terrorization of the enemy, and not the holding of territory.

— Saif al-Adel, March 2003.

In February 2006, the Combating Terrorism Center at West Point published a number of declassified documents from the Harmony database, some of which are known or believed to have been written by Saif Al-Adel. One is a letter signed "Omar Al-Sumali, previously known as Saif Al-Adel", about the author's activities in southern Somalia during UNOSOM II (1993–1995). It identifies the southern town of Ras Kamboni as a suitable site for an Al-Qaeda base. It mentions an accomplice of Adel called "Mukhtar".

In a letter from "'Abd-Al-Halim Adl'" to "'Mukhtar'", dated 13 June 2002, the author strongly criticises the leadership of Osama bin Laden, blaming the defeats of the preceding six months for Al-Qaeda on bin Laden's recklessness and unwillingness to listen to advice:

If someone opposes [bin Ladin], he immediately puts forward another person to render an opinion in his support, clinging to his opinion and totally disregarding those around him ... Perhaps, brother Abu Mattar has warned you that his opinion [of bin Ladin's leadership] has changed a lot since he got out of his previous situation.

From the following section, the 2002 addressee, "'Mukhtar'" appears to be Khalid Sheikh Mohammed, the commander of the September 11 attacks:

The East Asia, Europe, America, Horn of Africa, Yemen, Gulf, and Morocco groups have fallen, and Pakistan has almost been drowned in one push. I, not to mention the other individuals who have also moved and fallen, have often advised on this matter. Regrettably, my brother, if you look back, you will find that you are the person solely responsible for all this because you undertook the mission, and during six months, we only lost what we built in years.

In 2004, Adel was alleged to be the author of The Al-Battar Military Camp, a manual that advised prospective militants about how to strike easy targets.

On 11 March 2005, Al-Quds Al-Arabi published extracts from Adel's document, "Al Qaeda's Strategy to the Year 2020". In his May 2005 correspondence to Deputy Emir Ayman Al-Zawahiri, Saif Al-Adel outlined the key pillars in Al-Qaeda's revolutionary strategy:

- Decisive Jihadist activities that precisely delineates goals and targets. The ultimate objective is the revival of "Islamic way of life by means of establishing the state of Islam". This endeavour has to be supervised by qualified Islamic scholars (ulema)
- All decisions, objectives and policies should be based on the belief of Tawhid (Islamic monotheism)
- Every activity should be implemented on the basis of short-term and long-term strategic visions. Adel writes in his message to Zawahiri:
  "mujahidin should have short-term plans aimed at achieving interim goals and long-term plans aimed at accomplishing the greater objective, which is the establishment of a state."

March 2007, the Pentagon posted on the Internet a transcript of part of the hearing into the combatant status of detainee Ramzi bin Al-Shibh. Some of the evidence against bin Al-Shibh came from a diary of Saif Al-Adel found in Saudi Arabia in 2004.

The CSRT document described Al-Adel by the following:

Sayf Al-Adel is a senior Al-Qaeda military commander with a long-term relationship with Osama bin Laden. Sayf Al-Adel's role in the organization has been as a trainer, military leader, and key member of Osama bin Laden's security detail.
The diary of Sayf Al-Adel was recovered during a raid in Saudi Arabia in 2004. The diary details the Detainee's involvement in the 11 September 2001 terrorist plot and subsequent attack.

In addition, the paragraph continued:

The Detainee is listed as a "highly professional jihadist" along with "9/11 hijackers", Mohammed Atta and Ziad Jarrah. The diary states that the three were briefed on an operation involving aircraft by Abu Hafs, a senior Al-Qaeda planner.

In December 2010, Adel allegedly sent a series of five letters to Abu Walid al Masri, then under house arrest in Iran. He discusses the War in Afghanistan, criticises the religious failings of the mujahideen and hypocrisy of Islamic scholars, and the failure of the Jihadist movement to learn from previous mistakes. Al-Masri posted the letters on the Internet in December 2010. In March 2011, Adel allegedly released another five letters through al Masri, which covered the Arab Spring uprisings.

In August 2015, a eulogy written by Al-Adel for Abu Khalid Al-Suri, an Al-Qaeda veteran who served as both a senior figure in the Syrian opposition group Ahrar Al-Sham and as Ayman al Zawahiri's representative in Syria, was released. In the eulogy, he criticized the Islamic State and described them as having "twisted" and "perverted" thoughts.

In September 2024, a book was released online called "Free Reading of 33 Strategies of War", a commentary on the book of the same name by Robert Greene. For the first time, publishing under his real name Muhammad Salah Al-Din Zaydan, he outlines a radical new strategy for Al-Qaeda and global Jihad. This strategy seems to support a moving away from "traditional old-school Jihadi thinking" and especially from Sunni-centric focus and seeks to be flexible and build relationships with other Jihadi groups and nation states friendly to their ultimate goal, the destruction of the West. Sayf Al-Adel counselled Islamist fighters to prioritize attacking the police forces, military soldiers, state assets of enemy governments, etc. which he described as acceptable targets in military operations. Asserting that attacking women and children of enemies is contrary to Islamic values, Sayf Al-Adel asked: "If we target the general public, how can we expect their people to accept our call to Islam?". It has since been published on Amazon.

== Personal life ==
Adel is married to the daughter of Egyptian Jihadist and journalist, Abu Walid Al-Masri. The couple reportedly have five children.

== See also ==
- List of fugitives from justice who disappeared
- Abd Al-Rahman Al-Maghrebi
- Ahmed Al-Sharaa
