= Mahfouz Ould al-Walid =

Member of al-Qaeda

Mahfouz Ould al-Walid محفوظ ولد الوالد
- Born: 1 January 1975 (age 51); Mauritania
- Other names: Abu Hafs al-Mauritani; Khalid al-Shanqiti; Mafouz Walad al-Walid
- Known for: Islamic scholar and poet affiliated with al-Qaeda until the 11 September 2001 attacks.

Mahfouz Ould al-Walid (Arabic: محفوظ ولد الوالد; born 1 January 1975), kunya Abu Hafs al-Mauritani (Arabic: أبو حفص الموريتاني), is a Mauritanian Islamic scholar and poet previously associated with al-Qaeda. A veteran of the Soviet–Afghan War, he served on al-Qaeda's Shura Council and ran a religious school called the Institute of Islamic Studies in Kandahar, Afghanistan, from the late 1990s until the American invasion of Afghanistan in 2001.

Along with Saeed al-Masri and Saif al-Adel, al-Walid opposed the September 11 attacks two months prior to their execution. Under interrogation, Khalid Sheikh Mohammed said that al-Walid had opposed any large-scale attack against the United States and wrote bin Laden a stern letter warning against any such action, quoting the Quran.

Al-Walid fled from Afghanistan to Iran after the American invasion and was held there under house arrest from 2003 until April 2012. At that time, Iran extradited him to Mauritania, where he was held in prison until his release on 7 July 2012. He was released after renouncing his ties to al-Qaeda and condemning the 11 September attacks.

== Life ==
The publisher of the magazine Al-Talib (The Student), al-Walid wrote poetry that attracted the attention of Osama bin Laden, and was invited to give spiritual lectures to mujahideen at Afghan training camps. Sometime in late 2000 or early 2001, bin Laden was videotaped reciting al-Walid's poem "Thoughts Over al-Aqsa Intifadah".

It was later suggested that he had traveled to Iraq in early 1998 in an attempt to meet with Saddam Hussein, but was turned away as the leader did not want to create problems for his country.

Later in 1998, the United States learned al-Walid was staying in Room 13 at the Dana Hotel in Khartoum, and President Bill Clinton sought to have him killed or preferably renditioned to a friendly country for interrogation. When a plan was finally made to capture him using another country's officials, he had already left Sudan.

In 1998, Germany began monitoring Mohamedou Ould Slahi's accounts, and it was noticed that al-Walid had asked him to spare some money twice, resulting in a DM8,000 transfer in December and one other situation in which he sent him money. In January 1999, al-Walid telephoned Salahi using a monitored satellite phone he borrowed from Bin Laden. He was initially labeled as being the same person as Slahi by the Office of Foreign Assets Control, who amended their list in June 2007 to distinguish the two people. It was later suggested they were brothers-in-law, cousins or cousins-in-law. The confusion seemed to stem from the fact that al-Walid's wife and Salahi's wife were sisters.

In mid-2000, al-Walid was approached by Ahmed al-Nami and Mushabib al-Hamlan who asked him about becoming suicide operatives.

Ayman al-Zawahiri has credited al-Walid's book Islamic Action Between the Motives of Unit and the Advocates of Conflict as being one of the driving forces behind convincing al-Qaeda to merge with Egyptian Islamic Jihad in June 2001.

== War on terror ==
It is believed that the American invasion of Afghanistan following the September 11 attacks by Bin Laden actually drove al-Walid away from al-Qaeda and that he and a number of other discontented former members moved to the south to avoid connection with the ongoing fight. He was said to be opposed to the attacks both because he feared that the Americans would respond with force, but also because he felt that killing American civilians could not be justified on religious grounds.

The United States accused him of entering Iraq again in an attempt to get Saddam Hussein to negotiate but stated that he was rebuffed on the same terms as his first visit. He was reported killed twice, the second time following a 8 January 2002, airstrike in Zawar Kili, outside of Khost.

When Shadi Abdellah was arrested in 2002, he cooperated with authorities, but suggested that Abu Musab al-Zarqawi and Osama bin Laden were not as closely linked as previously believed, in large part because al-Zarqawi disagreed with many of the sentiments put forward by al-Walid for al-Qaeda.

Zawahiri continued to speak positively of the role al-Walid played in encouraging Pan-Islamic peace and cooperation.

Libyan Islamist Nomam Benothman also indicated in a letter to Bin Laden that he, al-Walid, and Al Qaeda security official Abu Muhammad al-Zayat opposed the 9/11 attacks.

In the 2008 Chilean book El Norte de Africa en la Intriga de al Qaeda, author Carlos Saldivia suggested that al-Walid was involved in the 2003 Casablanca bombings.
