= Rabeya Chowdhury =

Bangladeshi politician

- রাবেয়া চৌধুরী

Member of Jatiya Sangsad
- In office 3 September 2005 – 29 October 2006
- Preceded by: Rabia Bhuiyan
- Succeeded by: Tahura Ali
- Constituency: Reserved Women's Seat-19
- In office 5 March 1991 – 30 March 1996
- Succeeded by: Panna Kaiser
- Constituency: Reserved Women's Seat-27
- In office 2 April 1979 – 24 March 1982
- Preceded by: Position created
- Succeeded by: AJ Enayet Nur
- Constituency: Reserved Women's Seat-26

Personal details
- Political party: Bangladesh Nationalist Party
- Parent: Ashrafuddin Ahmad Chowdhury (father)

Rabeya Chowdhury is a prominent Bangladesh Nationalist Party politician. She is one of the vice chairpersons of the Bangladesh Nationalist Party (BNP), and also the Comilla District BNP president. She is a former member of the Jatiya Sangsad for four terms from a reserved seat.

== Early life ==
Chowdhury was born into a family from Batgram in Comilla District. She was the daughter of politician Ashrafuddin Ahmad Chowdhury and poet Razia Khatun Chowdhurani. She married Nasiruddin Chowdhury (d. 2020), a former magistrate, with whom she had two sons and a daughter.

== Career ==
Chowdhury is a senior leader in Bangladesh Nationalist Party (BNP), a vice chairperson in the BNP's Central Committee and also Comilla District BNP president. Chowdhury was elected to parliament from a reserved seat as a Bangladesh Nationalist Party candidate in 1979, 1991 and 2005.
