= Rabia School =

Location
- Portland Road; Luton, Bedfordshire, LU4 8AX; England; 51.887°N 0.441°W

Information
- Type: Private school
- Religious affiliation: Muslim
- Established: January 1996
- Closed: September 2021
- Department for Education URN: 130331 Tables
- Ofsted: Reports
- Gender: Girls/Boys (taught separately)
- Age: 2 to 16
- Enrolment: 271 as of March 2016
- Website: http://www.rabiaschool.uk/

Rabia School was a private Islamic faith school located in Luton, Bedfordshire, England. The school was owned and operated by a charitable trust (Rabia Education Trust). It was the first Islamic school to offer secondary education in Bedfordshire.

== History ==
Rabia School was established in January 1996 as a girls' school with seven pupils of primary age on the school register in a residential building. In October 2005 the school expanded by acquiring bigger premises for a boys school. The school then became a full-time primary and secondary independent school for girls and boys aged 5–16 years. There was a nursery school on the site for children aged 2–5.

Girls and boys attending the school were taught separately in different buildings. The school claimed to offer a mainstream education, but also had courses and subjects tailored to the Islamic faith. Special courses included Arabic, Urdu, as well as Aalim courses, and the chance for some pupils to memorise the whole of the Quran.

An Ofsted inspection in May 2014 rated the school as 'inadequate' and a monitoring inspection in January 2015 found that the school was still not meeting independent school standards. The inspections found that teaching was inadequate, and was undermining British values because of restricted educational opportunities for girls. The school claimed that it is addressing issues raised in the inspections. The school had previously criticised the 2014 inspection report as being "strongly politically and media led...especially with the recent fallout of the alleged Trojan Horse inquiry in Birmingham".

In April 2016 Ofsted chief Michael Wilshaw said that he had written to the Secretary of State for Education twice about Rabia School. The letters warn of serious concerns about staff segregation at the school, with male and female staff being segregated during meetings and training. While Wilshaw noted that the school had improved in many areas, he warned that staff segregation will prevent the school from moving up from an 'inadequate' rating. In May 2016 the Charity Commission announced that it was formally investigating the school.

In 2019 the school was banned from admitting new pupils. In November 2020 it was announced that the Department for Education would apply to close the school due to repeated failings. The school appealed this decision, but it closed as a school in September 2021.
