= Sarab Abu-Rabia-Queder =

Israeli sociologist

- سراب أبو ربيعة قادر
- Born: September 5, 1976 (age 49); Beersheba, Israel
- Education: Ben-Gurion University of the Negev, Hebrew University of Jerusalem, University of Oxford
- Children: 3
- Scientific career
- Fields: Sociology, Anthropology, Gender studies
- Workplaces: Ben-Gurion University of the Negev

Sarab Abu-Rabia-Queder (Arabic: سراب أبو ربيعة قادر; born September 5, 1976) is an Israeli-Arab sociologist, anthropologist, and feminist activist with a specialty in gender studies. She is the first Bedouin woman in Israel to receive a doctorate, and to be promoted to associate professor. In June 2021, she was appointed vice-president for Diversity and Inclusion at Ben-Gurion University of the Negev

== Early life and education ==
Sarab Abu-Rabia was born in Beersheba, on September 5, 1976. She is the eldest daughter of Abu Yunis, the first Bedouin doctor in the country, a resident of the tribe of Abu Rabia, the largest and most well known in the Negev. Her mother is from northern Israel. Abu Rabia has three sisters and a brother.

She studied at the Comprehensive High School in Beersheba, one of the better-funded Jewish schools in the city, and was the only Bedouin among 400 Jewish students. She received a master's degree from Ben-Gurion University of the Negev in 1995, a Ph.D. in 2006, and carried out postdoctoral fellowship in Gender Studies at the Hebrew University of Jerusalem and University of Oxford in England.

== Research and career ==
Abu-Rabia-Queder has been described in a literature review of Palestinian anthropology as "a pioneer of scholarship on the economies of Palestinian Bedouin women in Israel." She is an associate professor in the School of Education at Ben-Gurion University of the Negev.

She teaches Arab feminism in the Middle East, on Diversity and racism in the academic world. Her research includes education and employment among minority populations. She has published three books on the subject. A feminist activist and activist for the rights of Bedouin society in the Negev, she is one of the founders of the Forum of Arab Women's Organizations in the Negev. She serves as book review editor of Hagar Journal: Studies in Culture, Polity and Identities. Abu-Rabia-Queder's approach relies on postcolonial critique. Her areas of expertise and research include:

- Sociology of education, employment and gender in the mirror of postcolonial theory inequality
- Marginalization among indigenous minorities, particularly Palestinian society, Bedouin society, and Ethiopian women
- Native feminism and epistemic justice

== Personal life ==
She married Hassan Abu Qweider, an accountant, and is the mother of three sons. Abu-Rabia-Queder lives in Be'er Sheva.

== Awards and honors ==
- 2007–2008 – Breslauer Family, N.Y
- 2007–2008 – Pears Family Foundation, London, UK
- 2007–2008 – The Association for Promoting Bedouin Women s Education in the Negev, Israel
- 2005–2006 – University Women s Association in Israel, for the paper Women in Israeli Society

== Selected works ==
- Motivated and Loved: Stories of the Lives of Bedouin Educated Women, Magnes Press, The Hebrew University (2008)
- Palestinian Women in Israel: Identity, Power Relations and Coping, Hakibbutz Hame'uchad Publishing House and the Van Leer Jerusalem Institute (with Naomi Weiner-Levy, 2010)
- Class Identity in the Making: Prophylactic Philosophies in the Negev, Magnes Press, The Hebrew University (2017)

In scientific journals

- Abu-Rabia-Queder, Sarab (2006). Between tradition and modernization: Understanding the problem of Bedouin female dropout, British Journal of Sociology of Education, 27 (1), 3–17
- Abu-Rabia-Queder, Sarab (2007). Permission to rebel: Arab Bedouin women changing negotiation of social roles, Feminist Studies, 33 (1), 161–187
- Abu-Rabia-Queder, Sarab (2007). Coping with "forbidden love" and forlessess marriage: Educated Bedouin women from the Negev, Ethnography, 8 (3), 297–323
- Abu-Rabia-Queder, Sarab (2007). The activism of Bedouin women: Social and political resistance, HAGAR: Studies in Culture, Policy and Identities, 7 (2), 67–84
- Abu-Rabia-Queder, Sarab (2008). Politics of conformity: Power for creating change, Ethnology: An International Journal of Cultural and Social Anthropology, 47 (4), 209–225
- Abu-Rabia-Queder, Sarab & Weiner-Levi, Naomi (2008). Identity and gender in cultural transitions: Returning home from higher education as "internal immigrants" among Bedouin and Druze women in Israel, Social Identities: Journal for the Study of Race, Nation and Culture, 14 (6), 665–682
- Abu-Rabia-Queder, Sarab (2008). Does education necessarily mean enlightenment? The case of Palestinian Bedouin women in Israel, Anthropology and Education Quarterly, 39 (4), 381–400
- Abu-Rabia-Queder, Sarab & Oplatka, Izhar (2008). The power of femininity among female leadership in Bedouin society: Exploring the gender and ethnic experiences of Muslim women who accessed the supervisor, Journal of Educational Administration, 46 (3), 396–415
- Abu-Rabia-Queder, Sarab (2008). "Management and Gender in Bedouin Society" Gender and management in Bedouin society, Megamot, 45 (3), 489-509 (Hebrew)
- Abu-Rabia-Queder, Sarab (2011). Higher education as a platform for cultural transition: The case of the first educated Bedouin women in Israel, Higher Education Quarterly, 65 (2), 186–205
- Abu-Rabia-Queder, Sarab & Arar, Khaled (2011). Gender and higher education in different national spaces: Palestinian women studying in Israeli and Jordanian universities, Journal: International and Comparative Education, 41 (3), 1–18
- Arar, Khaled & Abu-Rabia-Queder, Sarab (2011). Turning points in the lives of two pioneer Arab women principals in Israel, Gender & Education, 23 (4), 415–429
- Abu-Rabia-Queder, Sarab & Karplus, Yuval (2012). Regendering space and reconstruction identity: Bedouin women's translocal mobility into Israeli-Jewish institutions of higher education, Gender, Place and Culture; A Journal of Feminist Geography, 1–17.
- Weiner-Levi, Naomi & Abu-Rabia-Queder, Sarab (2012). Researching my people, researching the "other": Field experiences of two researchers along shifting positions, Quality and Quantity: International Journal of Methodology, 46 (4), 1151–1165
- Abu-Rabia-Queder, Sarab (2014). "Our problem is two problems: That you're a woman and that you're educated": Gendering and racializing Bedouin women experience at Israeli universities. International Journal of Educational Development 35: 44–52
- Abu-Rabia-Queder, Sarab & Weiner-Levy, Naomi (2013). Between local and foreign structures: Exploring the agency of Palestinian women in Israel, Social Politics: International Studies in Gender, State & Society, 20 (1): 88 -108
