= Rabia Bhuiyan =

Bangladeshi barrister and politician

- রাবিয়া ভুইয়া

Minister of Social Welfare and Women Affairs
- In office 10 August 1987 – 27 February 1985

Member of Parliament for Reserved Women's Seat-21
- In office 1986–1988
- Preceded by: Gulbadan
- Succeeded by: Shamsunnahar

Member of Parliament for Reserved Women's Seat-19
- In office 12 June 1996 – 15 July 2001
- Preceded by: Sarwari Rahman
- Succeeded by: Rabeya Chowdhury

Personal details
- Born: 1 March 1944 (age 82) Dhaka, Bengal Province, British India
- Party: Jatiya Party (Ershad)
- Spouse: AKM Mozammel Hoque Bhuiyan

Rabia Bhuiyan (born 1 March 1944) is a Jatiya Party (Ershad) politician and a former Jatiya Sangsad member from women's reserved seat 19. She is the first female barrister in Bangladesh. She is most notable for founding the law school, Bhuiyan Academy, in Dhaka.

== Early life ==
Bhuiyan was born on 1 March 1944 in Dhaka in the then British India (now in Bangladesh). She was married to barrister AKM Mozammel Hoque Bhuiyan (1939-2008).

== Career ==
Bhuiyan was elected to parliament from a reserved seat as a Jatiya Party (Ershad) candidate in June 1996. She and her husband founded Bhuiyan Academy which provides distance learning for law courses from University of London.

Bhuiyan served as the minister of social welfare and women's affairs in the first Hasina cabinet. In 1998, with the then deputy speaker's consent, she became the first female voted speaker for a one-day parliament session.

In 1999, Bhuiyan filed a landmark environment case titled Rabia Bhuiyan, MP v Ministry of LGRD which acknowledged that the government has a responsibility to ensure access to safe drinking water.
