= College of Islamic and Arabic Studies, Afghanistan =

The College of Islamic and Arabic Studies in Afghanistan was an organization where American intelligence analysts asserted was tied to al Qaeda. They reported that Mahfouz Ould al-Walid, better known as "Abu Hafs al-Mauritani", the director of the institution, was a senior member of al Qaeda's leadership circle. When analysts went over the grounds of the institute they found what they characterized as "martyrship videos". Guantanamo captive Abd Al Rahim Abdul Rassak Janko testified that the recording of him was not a martyrship video at all, but rather a confession. He acknowledged that he had travelled to Afghanistan, in 2000, to offer his services to the Taliban, but he had inadvertently triggered the suspicion he was an Israeli or American spy. He asserted that the Taliban turned him over to the Taliban to torture a confession out of him, and that the recording was the confession that followed his torture. He asserted he was interrogated and tortured at the institute for two weeks.

According to Gabriel Weimann, in "Responses to cyber terrorism", the institute ran a virtual magazine dedicated to promoting global jihad, entitled "Sawt al-Jihad".
