= Grindu, Ialomița =

Grindu
- Commune
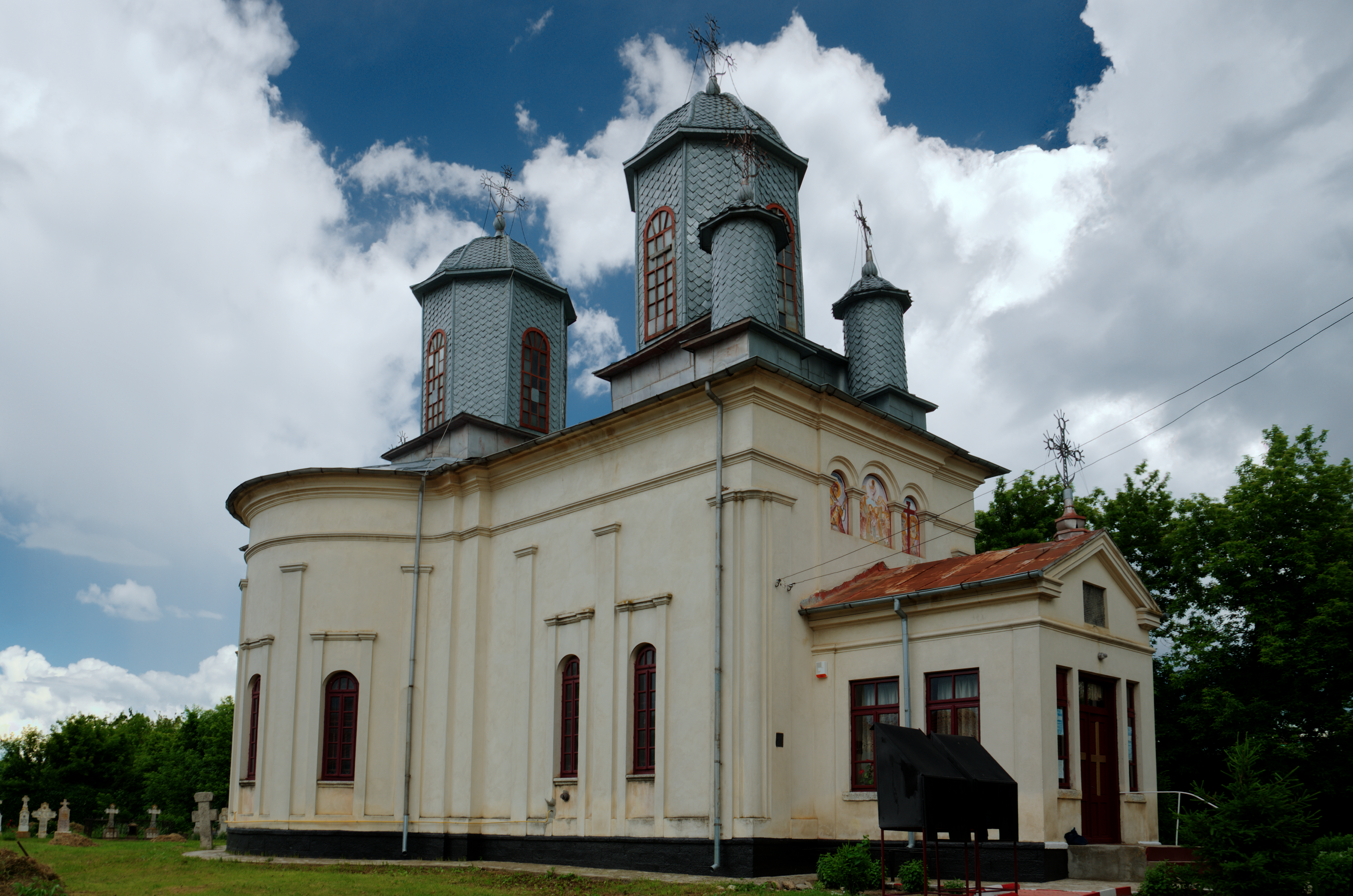
- Church of the Ascension of Christ in Grindu

- Location in Ialomița County

- Location in Romania
- Coordinates: 44.770°N 26.908°E
- Country: Romania
- County: Ialomița

Government
  - Mayor (2024–2028): Marian Trîmbițașu (PSD)
- Elevation: 64 m (210 ft)
- Population (2021-12-01): 1,925
- Time zone: UTC+02:00 (EET)
  - Summer (DST): UTC+03:00 (EEST)
- Postal code: 927140
- Area code: +40 243
- Vehicle reg.: IL
- Website: www.grindu.ro

Grindu is a commune located in Ialomița County, Muntenia, Romania. It is composed of a single village, Grindu.

The commune is in the northern part of Ialomița County, 30 km (19 mi) northeast of the city of Urziceni and 57 km (35 mi) northwest of the county seat, Slobozia, on the border with Buzău County. The Grindu train station serves the CFR Main Line 700, which connects the capital city, Bucharest, to Galați and the border with Moldova at Giurgiulești.

Historical population
Year	Pop.	±%
1899	2,883	—
1925	2,559	−11.2%
2002	2,438	−4.7%
2011	2,209	−9.4%
2021	1,925	−12.9%
Source: Census data

== Notable residents ==
- Maria Petre (born 1951), politician and economist
