= Rabiah Hutchinson =

Australian Islamic leader

Rabiah Hutchinson (born Robyn Mary Hutchinson in August 1953) is an Australian Muslim sometimes described as the "matriarch" of radical Salafi jihadist Islam in Australia. Hutchinson, a one time Presbyterian country girl "turned marijuana-smoking beach bunny and hippy backpacker" turned Islamic extremist has married at least eight times as of 2006, primarily to members of Al-Qaeda and Jemaah Islamiah, and has been the subject of an investigation by Australian Security Intelligence Organisation (ASIO). Hutchinson traveled to the Mujahideen camps in Afghanistan and into Osama bin Laden's inner circle and is believed to have been schooled there by the Mujaheddin. She is the mother-in-law of Al-Qaeda's current leader, Saif al-Adel; he married her daughter Asma, from her third marriage to Egyptian journalist Abu Walid al-Masri.

== Early life ==
Hutchinson is of Scottish ancestry, and was born in August 1953 in Mudgee to a Sydney Presbyterian family; she later became a Baptist and then converted to Catholicism, eventually, Hutchinson converted to Sunni Islam.

== Involvement in Afghan Arab affairs ==
Hutchinson was linked with radical Indonesian clerics in the 1980s. She worked as a doctor for members of the mujahideen on the Pakistan-Afghanistan border in the 1990s. In Pakistan, she initially settled in the town of Pabbi, where a growing number of Afghan refugees affected by the war and foreign volunteers were pouring in. The only other Australian she knew in Pabbi was her friend Aisha, an Aboriginal convert whose husband had organised Rabiah's arrival in Pakistan, and who would bring Rabiah a jar of Vegemite when visiting. While living in Kabul, Afghanistan, Hutchinson met her third husband, Egyptian Mustafa Hamid (Abu Walid al-Masri). In Kabul, Hutchinson was regarded for her medical knowledge.

== ASIO investigation ==
ASIO's assessment states that Ms. Hutchinson "has directly supported extremist activities" and, if allowed to travel, is "likely to engage in conduct that might prejudice the security of Australia or a foreign country".

Rabiah Hutchinson and her daughter Rahmah Wisudo were placed on a "no-fly list" due to alleged links to radical Yemeni cleric Anwar al-Aulaqi, who had ties to an offshoot of the al-Qaeda terrorist group.

Rabiah maintains she was labeled as an al-Qaeda operative because the authorities wanted "someone to blame".

== In the media ==
=== Jihad Sheilas ===
Rabiah Hutchinson was one of the women featured in a documentary Jihad Sheilas aired on ABC television.

== Family ==
As of December 2006, Hutchinson had been married eight times. She has been married to both Abdul Rahim Ayub and Abu Walid al-Masri. Two of her sons were arrested in Yemen, and were alleged to be linked to Jack Roche. Her daughter is married to Khaled Cheikho.
