= Epoca (Romania) =

Romanian daily newspaper

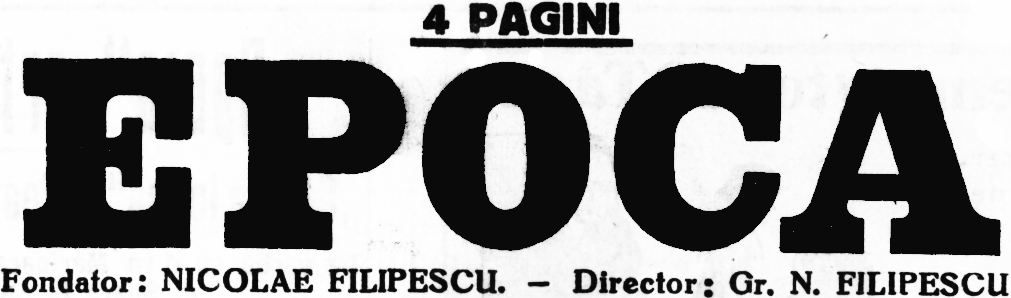
- Masthead in February 1926
- First-ever issue of Epoca, 16 November 1885
- Type: Daily newspaper
- Format: Broadsheet
- Owner: Grigore Filipescu (last)
- Founder: Nicolae Filipescu
- Founded: 16 November 1885; 140 years ago
- Ceased publication: 15 July 1938; 88 years ago
- Political alignment: Right-wing; Romanian nationalism; Junimism (to c. 1910); National conservatism (after 1890); Anti-fascism (1930s)
- Language: Romanian
- Headquarters: Blaremberg House, Episcopiei Street (1885); Clemenței Street 3, Bucharest (1886–1916); Iași (1918); Astoria Hotel, Calea Victoriei, Bucharest (1926)
- City: Bucharest
- Country: Kingdom of Romania
- Circulation: 15,000 (as of 1936)

Epoca ("The Epoch") was a Romanian daily newspaper, published from Bucharest (and occasionally from Iași) in multiple series between 1885 and 1938. Until just before World War I, it was a mouthpiece of the Conservative Party, but more closely adhered to the fluctuating views of its owner, Nicolae Filipescu. As such, the paper was initially staffed by populists such as Barbu Ștefănescu Delavrancea and Alexandru Vlahuță, both of whom were sacked by Filipescu in 1886; though he maintained their neo-romantic approach to literature, he did not appreciate their extolling of the peasant class, nor their recurring conflict with the Junimea faction. Shortly after, Epoca merged into the Junimist paper, Constituționalul, only to reemerge as an independent publication in 1895. The patron changed several editorial teams, until finding Alexandru Antemireanu as his mainstay. Filipescu also combined Junimism with national conservatism, and his mix was adopted to varying degrees by his writing staff. As such, in the 1890s Epoca hosted articles by Ion Luca Caragiale, whose critique of the National Liberal Party came to border on xenophobia.

In the period leading up to World War I, Epoca, directly managed by Timoleon Pisani, fused together the various currents of Romanian nationalism, and allowed Nicolae Iorga to publish his right-wing critique of Junimea. It was however staunchly opposed to left-nationalists and Poporanists such as Constantin Stere. Filipescu's uncompromising positions on such topics, and his leanings toward Russophilia, made the editorial offices vulnerable to penetration by spies from the Russian Empire (Gheorghe V. Madan, and later Ilie Cătărău). They embraced its counterrevolutionary narrative, while diverting nationalism exclusively against Russia's opponents. Concerned about the fate of Romanians in Austria-Hungary, and increasingly supportive of Greater Romanian unification, Filipescu split with the Conservative and the Junimists by favoring the Entente powers. The newspaper followed suit, publishing content that excoriated the "Germanophiles" and called for war with the Central Powers. It openly celebrated when Romania joined the Entente, but went under during the paralyzing counteroffensive of 1916–1917; Filipescu himself died in that interval.

Epoca was revived in 1918, shortly before the actual establishment of Greater Romania, by Nicolae's son Grigore Filipescu; when his personal resources were exhausted, funding mainly came from banker Aristide Blank. Reduced in content and attracting less familiar writers, it was largely used by Filipescu Jr in airing his political opinions, and from 1929 was an official paper of his Vlad Țepeș League. It embraced a monarchist vision that was centered on the exiled Prince Carol, exulting as he returned on the throne in June 1930. For the rest of its existence, Epoca began slipping away from the Carlist camp, criticizing governments for their debt relief policies, and ultimately chiding the king's own camarilla. It was briefly infiltrated by fascists such as Gheorghe Beza, and embarrassed by the latter's engagement in political violence; while still nationalistic, it emerged as highly critical of Fascist Italy, Nazi Germany, and the local Iron Guard. It finally went under due to restrictions imposed by Carol's authoritarian constitution, with all prospects of revival exhausted when Filipescu died later in 1938.

== Inauguration ==
Epoca emerged on 16 November 1885, shortly after the coagulation of a conservative camp within the newly-formed kingdom's two-party system, whose other component was the National Liberal Party (PNL). The first piece by Nicolae Filipescu, appearing on 27 November, was an attempted deconstruction of the PNL platform. At that early stage, the editorial staff was made up of Grigore Păucescu (as political editor), Barbu Ștefănescu Delavrancea (as first editor), Filipescu, Alexandru Vlahuță, and some others. Constantin Bacalbașa, who was contributing a humorous column under the pen name of "Radu Țandără", claims to have observed the real power-relations. In his reading, the paper belonged to Filipescu in all but name, while Păucescu and Delavrancea were his "props". This view was partly contradicted by Delavrancea's own account—he notes having been involved in discussions to create the paper (going back to October 1885), and explains that he was morally opposed to the PNL. The young writer was also strongly committed to Epoca, and in one instance dueled Alexandru Djuvara of L'Indépendence Roumaine in a sword-fight; it ended with no casualties when Djuvara stated that was getting too tired. Also debuting at Epoca "from its very foundation", Alexandru Davila recalled that Filipescu was the paper's financial provider, with smaller sums sent in by his three associates—Leon Ghica, Constantin Hiott, and Alexandru A. Balș.

In its first year, Epoca had its offices at a basement on Episcopiei Street, owned by the Conservative politico Nicolae Blaremberg (the complex was since demolished to make way for the Athénée Palace). This first edition highlighted its closeness to the conservative wing of the Romanian Orthodox Church, which, through Bishop Melchisedec Ștefănescu, maintained links with Russian Orthodoxy. In December 1887, it was the only secular paper to discuss Melchisedec's silver jubilee, with a biographical note that was probably submitted by the bishop himself (who, in June 1888, reported that Epoca was one of only three papers that he still read). The burgeoning newspaper also drew attention with its ample literary columns. As observed by scholar Remus Zăstroiu, these illustrated Delavrancea and Vlahuță's shared taste for neo-romanticism, with only some traces of literary naturalism; with Epoca, Vlahuță mocked Alexandru Macedonski's aestheticism, while airing his own critique of the Romanian monarchy, and of the competing PNL, in a number of poems and articles.

As author of the satirical column Cronice, Dimitrie R. Rosetti was embracing the Conservative program, and ridiculing the PNL's views on society. Literary historian Florin Faifer calls these pieces "brutal jibes", "of doubtul taste", and too focused on commentary about his adversaries' physical attributes. The ideological mix was also found in the supplement Epoca Ilustrată, which was put out for a while after 1 January 1886; it had contributions by Mihai Eminescu, Bogdan Petriceicu Hasdeu, Titu Maiorescu, and Iacob Negruzzi. The newspaper staff indirectly witnessed Eminescu's physical decline and loss of mental stability: as Epoca's parliamentary reporter, Davila attended the 1888 Assembly of Deputies session which provided Eminescu with a disability pension.

At that stage of his career, Filipescu generally approved of the anti-monarchist line; he too was a critic of King Carol I, seeing him as a PNL stooge. However, the Delavrancea wing of the staff created embarrassment within the Conservative caucus, since it always supported the sharecroppers over the landowners. As Delavrancea puts it: Eu dam întruna cu țăranii și lor le ardea de altceva ("I would always side with the peasants, and they were not in the mood for that"). He was also airing his disputes with the Conservative internal faction, Junimea, which had rejected him. Several of his articles contained jibes at the Junimist leader, Titu Maiorescu. Filipescu took full control in early 1886, when he was announced as both owner and manager—pushing out Delavrancea and Vlahuță, and, from September, hiring Grigore Ventura to be the head editor. Ventura was additionally the theatrical columnist, but, in his absence, that role was fulfilled by Davila.

Epoca founders
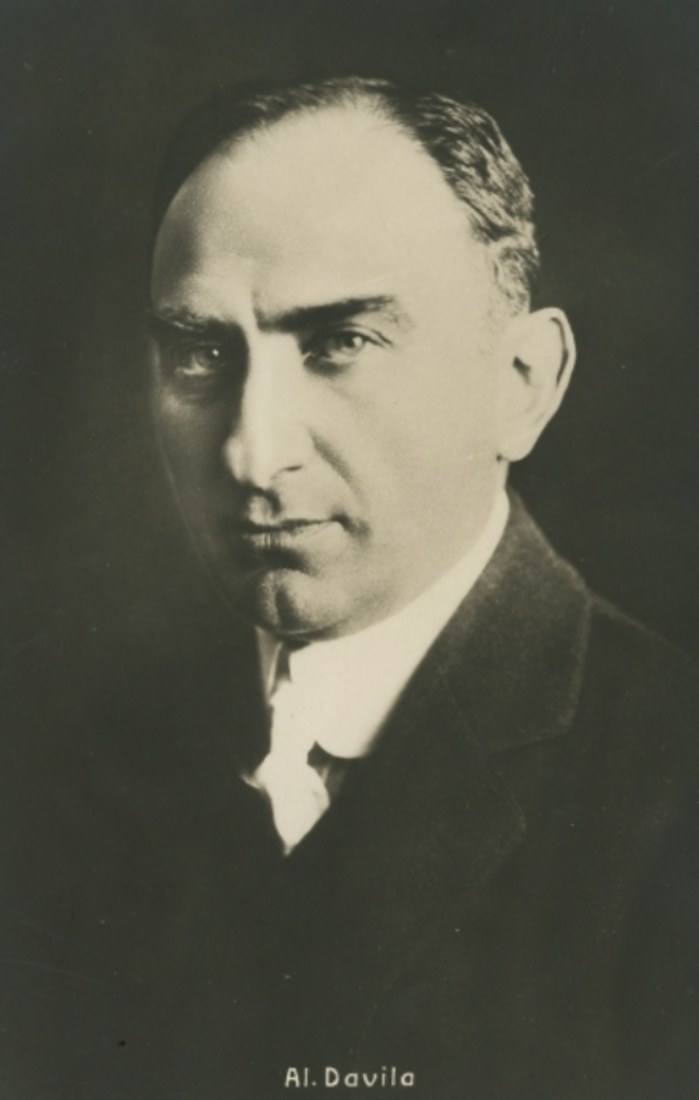
Alexandru Davila c. 1910

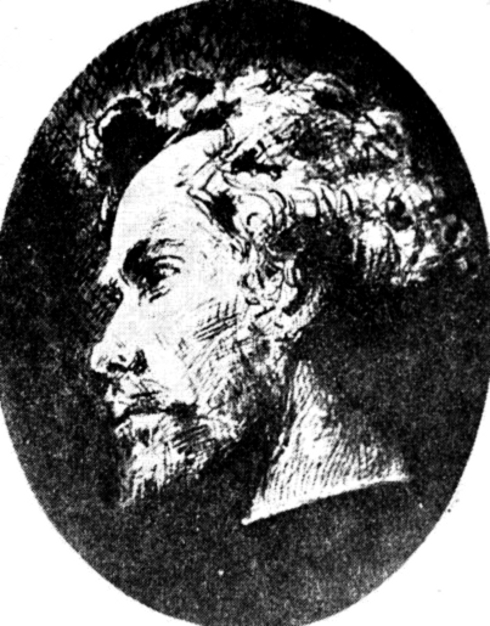
Barbu Ștefănescu Delavrancea (self-portrait) in 1885

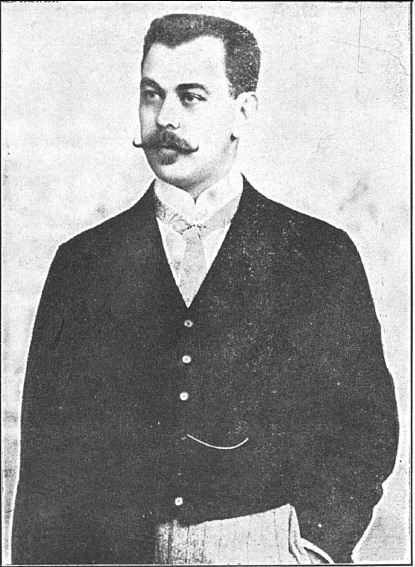
Nicolae Filipescu c. 1890

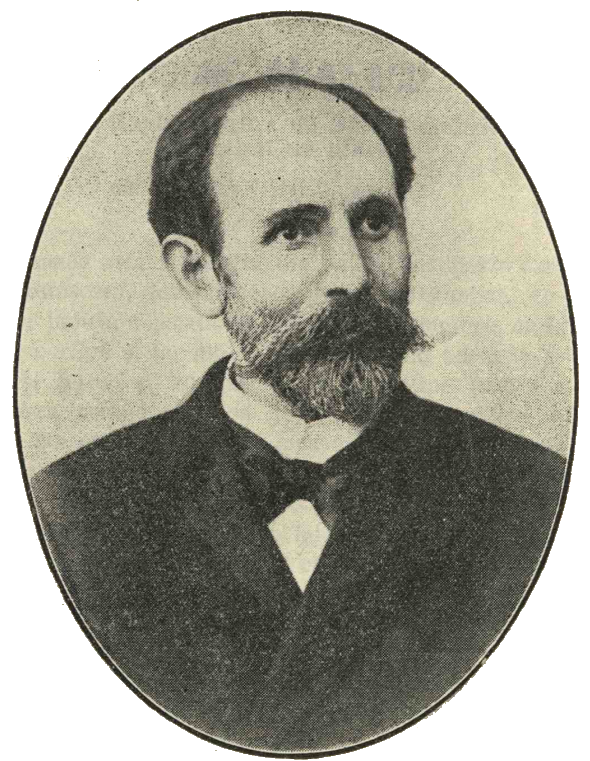
Grigore Păucescu, c. 1890

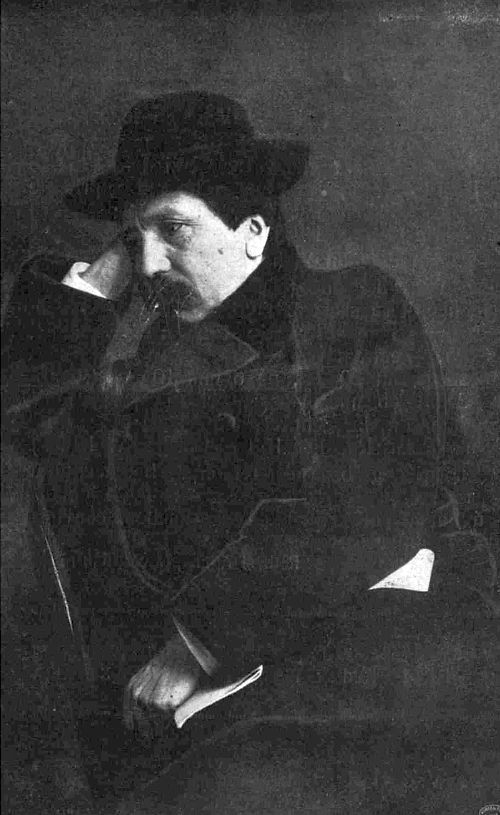
Alexandru Vlahuță in 1905

== Early battles ==
Literary historian Nicolae Lascu writes that Epoca began with a "large circulation, meant to supply readers from its own party, as well as some of its political adversaries". The second editorial office was at No 3 Clemenței Street, in a building shared with Heliadi's print shop and located just outside Păucescu's villa (on grounds later covered by the Central University Library). The unusually large signboard was still visible at that location in 1933, though the offices had moved. Bacalbașa suggests that Epoca was "the most widely read political newspaper", with content that was secretly authored by Filipescu; the newspaper's very creation helped exacerbate political tensions—mounting the most competent opposition to the PNL and its Brătianu cabinet. The Clemenței Street offices were said to have been raided by government supporters in June 1886, and its staff writer Emil A. Frunzescu was reportedly assaulted during that incident. The issue was brought up in the Assembly by Nicolae Ionescu, of the Sincere Liberals opposition group, who spoke for more than three hours. Ionescu paid homage to Epoca as "the dignified organ of the young conservatives".

During September 1886, after an assassination attempt targeting Prime Minister (and PNL chairman) Ion C. Brătianu, his incensed partisans raided Epoca and brutalized its on-call editor, Thoma Bazilescu, before moving on to attack other opposition gazettes. An inquest by the examining magistrates concluded that government had ordered street sergeants not to intervene, allowing the assailants to "do as they pleased". Filipescu's hands-on approach was again manifested in 1887, when he and his Epoca staffer A. A. Balș invaded the home of a National Liberal rival, Nicolae Xenopol, and were only chased out at gunpoint. Both assailants were tried for this misdemeanor, and only freed by an amnesty, some three months into their sentence. Shortly after, the offices of both Epoca and L'Indépendence Roumaine were vandalized by their respective opponents. In November 1887, the newspaper held a banquet for the "United Opposition", which had unified various splinters of the PNL with the Conservatives. At this function, an unnamed speaker issued a warning for the king, demanding that he either call on Brătianu to resign or accept his own dethronement.

Epoca's cultural pages were also used for airing polemics with the PNL. During 1887, the Romanian polymath Alexandru Odobescu, hiding under the signature "Ibis", wrote articles that mocked Ovid, the 1st-century Roman poet. Odobescu's uncharacteristic hostility (clashing with his earlier translations from Ovid) was occasioned by the PNL's association with the cult of Ovid as an exile in future Romania (and, more intimately, with the inauguration of an Ovid statue in Constanța). Filipescu and Nicolae Fleva were personally involved in the unusually violent protests of March 1888. Both were briefly arrested after allegedly shooting at the Assembly's usher; the incidents prompted Carol to bring in Theodor Rosetti, a Junimist, as a peacemaking Prime Minister. During the subsequent legislative elections of October, two members of Epoca's staff, Bazilescu and Milone Lugomirescu, were reportedly considered as candidates for the Junimea caucus, within the larger Conservative alliance.

During the campaign season, Epoca produced the slogan Țara e conservatoare ("The country is conservative"), which was meant as a driver for an easy victory over the PNL. Also then, Filipescu and his men were confronted by the inauguration of a more left-wing daily, Adevărul, which aimed to have Alexandru Al. Ioan Cuza elected as Romanian king. Filipescu's partisans laughed off its ambitions, noting that they were already out of step with the goals of Romania's populace; the unsigned columnist also told Adevărul that it could expect no co-operation with Epoca, which had "nothing in common" with it. In that context, the two camps also clashed over matters of international policy: Adevărul worked for an alliance with the Russian Empire, while Epoca expressed worries that Bessarabia Governorate was being Russified by those who "hate the Romanian language." On the PNL side, the intrigue drew much attention, since Adevărul now claimed that Filipescu and other Conservatives had previously worked with Cuza's supporters in undermining Carol's throne.

The vote secured gains for the governing alliance, and instituted Junimist power under the second Rosetti cabinet. In that context, however, Filipescu sparked intrigues against Dumitru Brătianu's Liberal Democratic faction, which had helped defeat the PNL as part of a government arc. In December 1888, Epoca excoriated one of government's independent allies, Nicolae Voinov, which allowed PNL newspapers to content that the coalition was faltering. As summarized by the cultural historian Z. Ornea: "[By 1888] the Junimists had engineered the gradual takeover of N. Filipescu's Epoca group. This poaching was not without prudent reservations on Filipescu's side [...]." At that stage, Ionaș Grădișteanu, who had been affiliated with the editorial staff, quit in protest, since he viewed himself as incompatible with the Junimist agenda. On 14 or 15 June 1889, Epoca merged with Junimea's România Liberă to become Constituționalul ("The Constitutionalist").

== Caragiale's tenure ==
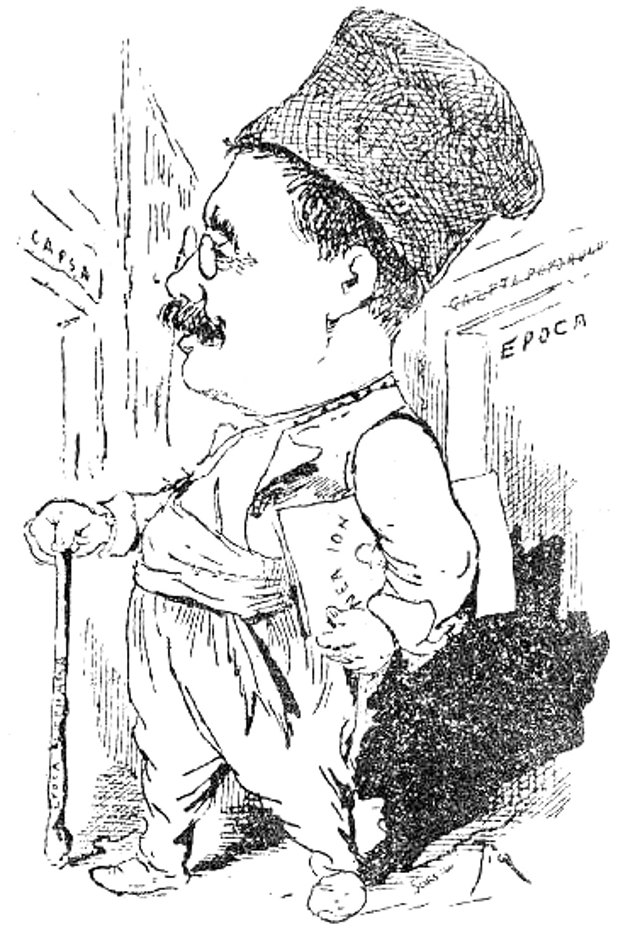
Ion Luca Caragiale on his way out of the Epoca offices (1890s caricature by Constantin Jiquidi)

Absorbed by his activities as Mayor of Bucharest, Filipescu drifted apart from Junimists Maiorescu and Petre P. Carp after elections in March 1892. He was incensed that their activities within the Catargiu administration included measures against economic nationalism. The standalone Epoca was revived on 2 November 1895—an undertitle was added, clarifying its status as a "conservative newspaper" (ziar conservator). From 19 November, it had its own printing press, announcing that "our paper will now be improved in every aspect." Filipescu was again sole editor, remaking Epoca into a modernized newspaper that was closely based on its French counterparts. Resuming his feud with the throne, he was forced to account for his party's defeat in the December election, as Țara e dinastică ("The country is with the dynasty"). The supposed elucidation was seized upon by left-wing intellectuals, grouped in the Social Democratic Workers' Party (PSDMR), who remarked that it was the exact opposite of what Epoca had stood for in 1888.

At the time, Filipescu was recruiting among dissidents on the left, personally negotiating for George Panu and his Radical Party to be welcomed into Conservative ranks. From November 1895 to March 1896, the former PSDMR cadre Anton Bacalbașa was Filipescu's chief editor, but, Zăstroiu notes, his activity was minimal: as Demagog, he produced editorials that bordered on lampoons. Afterwards, Filipescu resumed his sway over the editorial line, turning it toward national conservatism, which implied borrowing from the far-right of Romanian nationalism. As Zăstroiu writes, the inspiration for this transition was foreign, since Filipescu had read Ferdinand Brunetière. Ion Luca Caragiale, the celebrated humorist and dramatist, also joined the staff. He had previously worked for George D. Pallade at Gazeta Poporului (where his assignments included habitually mocking Filipescu), but had then joined Panu's Radicals. In early 1897, while at Evenimentul daily, he had discussed theatrical matters in a series of polemical articles; Epoca had responded to these, enlisting Ștefan Vellescu as its temporary columnist.

Initially made Epoca's political editor, Caragiale was thereafter manager of the literary sections. Caragiale's leading work for Epoca was a set of biographies of political figures that he either liked or despised. The former category included a young Conservative, Take Ionescu, who was becoming Caragiale's favorite. He also contributed a series of satirical texts that mostly targeted the PNL. According to literary historian Marin Bucur, it showed Caragiale at his most xenophobic: despite being himself Greek, he spoke at length of the National Liberals as "the filth of the Phanar".

Filipescu still handled political alignments, and, in May 1896, prevented Epoca from even mentioning Carol's tricennial anniversary. Bucur opines that Caragiale may have been stopped by Filipescu from mocking the PNL's main proposal of the time, namely a law mandating the six-day workweek; Caragiale compensated by lampooning that proposal in Fleva's newspaper, Dreptatea, which was also A. Bacalbașa's new workplace. Also recruited in 1897, Timoleon Pisani was editor of international news. His first celebrated scoops came during that year's Greco–Turkish War, which he covered from Athens. He too was of Greek origin; in his encounters with Caragiale, he provided him with literary subjects from the Sublime Porte. As part of these exchanges, Pisani observed that his older colleague could not speak Greek, despite it being his ancestors' language.

== Antemireanu's arrival ==
Epoca was becoming more relevant as a literary publication, with this aspect handled by Alexandru Antemireanu (until 1903) and (only in 1897) by Ștefan Octavian Iosif. Antemireanu was highly supportive of Junimea, citing Maiorescu and Eminescu as his two main sources of inspiration, and prolonging their polemics with Macedonski. He combined these stances with echoes from Brunetière, which became explicit in his controversial series of articles about the "debacle of science". For a while beginning in April 1896, the literary content was largely confined to a weekly supplement, Epoca Literară. Though it closed down in June, it is noted locally for having had Caragiale as its caretaker—with Antemireanu and Iosif as his deputies. During its ten-issue run, it featured commentary by Caragiale and Panu—the former advocated for professionalism in writing, exposed plagiarism, and added biographical sketches on authors he admired (such as Cilibi Moise).

For his part, Panu suggested that young writers needed to research their Romantic-era predecessors (whose work was regularly sampled over the other pages), and condemned Eminescu as a negative influence. Caragiale insisted on obtaining a permanent collaboration from Constantin Rădulescu-Motru, with both of them writing pieces that mocked the "pathological literature" of George Ionescu-Gion. Rădulescu-Motru became noted for his other contribution—a serialized biography of Friedrich Nietzsche. The Epoca Literară circle of contributors additionally included Cincinat Pavelescu. He recalled being tenured there after winning Caragiale's poetry contest, which was for a sonnet with eleven-syllable verses and "impossible rhymes"; afterwards, Pavelescu was pranked by his boss, who modified one of his love poems to read like the confession of a dowry-chaser. Also joining them were Delavrancea, Iosif, George Coșbuc, Anghel Demetriescu, Petre Dulfu, Alceu Urechia, and a young Jewish poet, Alexandru Toma (born Solomon Moscovici, he got his pen name from Caragiale).

When Epoca ended its supplement and refused its literary pages into the core newspaper, its more or less regular contributors were Coșbuc (with notes on paremiology), Gheorghe V. Madan (with reviews covering Russian literature), François Robin (with an overview of France–Romania relations), Theodor Speranția (as literary historian and education columnist), and Oscar Spirescu (as a music critic). From 1897, Epoca hosted Panait Cerna and Dumitru Karnabatt, with some of their first-ever literary productions. Zăstroiu also identified the young authors Tudor Arghezi and Gala Galaction as sharing the pen name Matei Corbora, which was used for a set of art chronicles in 1898. In 1897, Epoca hosted Caragiale's in-depth reportage, O cercetare literară, which probed the main currents in Romanian literature during the fin de siècle, dividing them into "naturalistic", "romantic", and "idealistic".

Fiction in prose form was contributed by Antemireanu and Caragiale, by Caragiale's former enemy Ionescu-Gion, and likewise by Ioan A. Bassarabescu and Emanuil Grigorovitza. Coșbuc, Iosif, and Speranția also used Epoca for publishing new poetry, as did others—including Alexandru Obedenaru, D. Nanu, Radu D. Rosetti, Nicolae Mihăescu-Nigrim, and Vasile Podeanu. At that stage, Epoca ran articles on popular science, primarily written by Victor Anestin, and had a humorous page, with contributions by Nae Dumitrescu Țăranu. Especially through Antemireanu, Epoca had near-daily translations of sketch stories by François Coppée, Leconte de Lisle, Catulle Mendès, François de Nion, Paul Rouget, and various other French authors; through Madan and others, it extended its international coverage—publishing pieces by Nikolai Gogol, Heinrich Heine, Sándor Petőfi, Henryk Sienkiewicz, and Leo Tolstoy. With his somewhat modern tastes, Antemireanu used Epoca to challenge the assumptions of neo-romanticism, as well as some of the Junimist tenets—in particular by arguing that Romanian folklore had little artistic worth.

Antemireanu's team
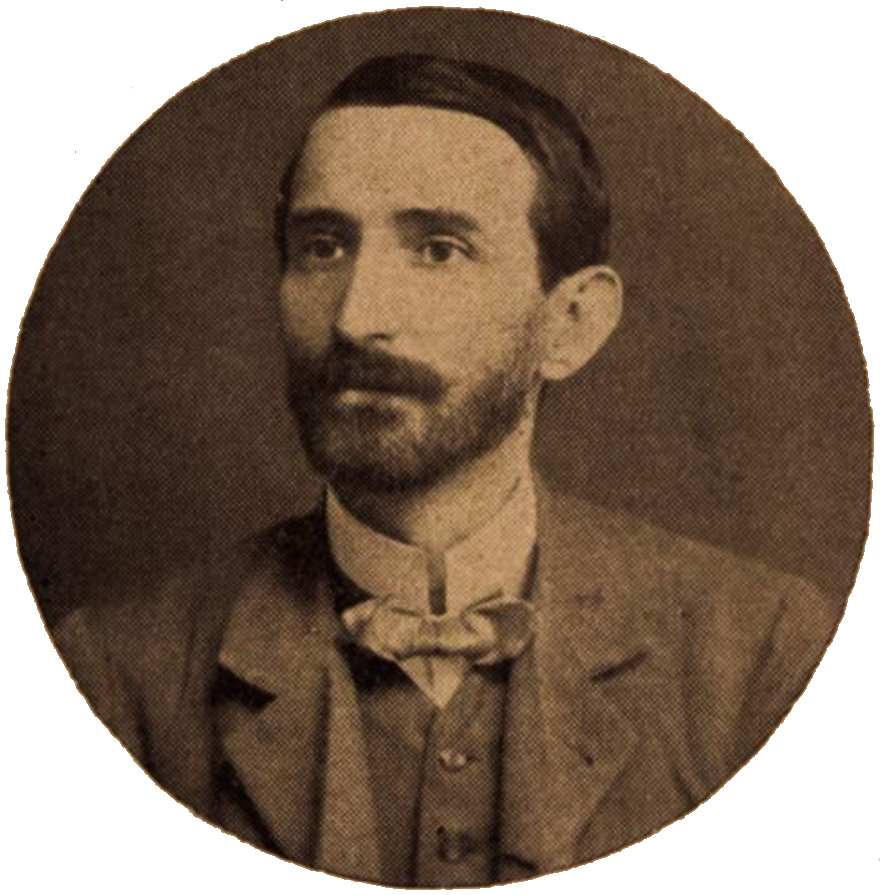
Victor Anestin c. 1900

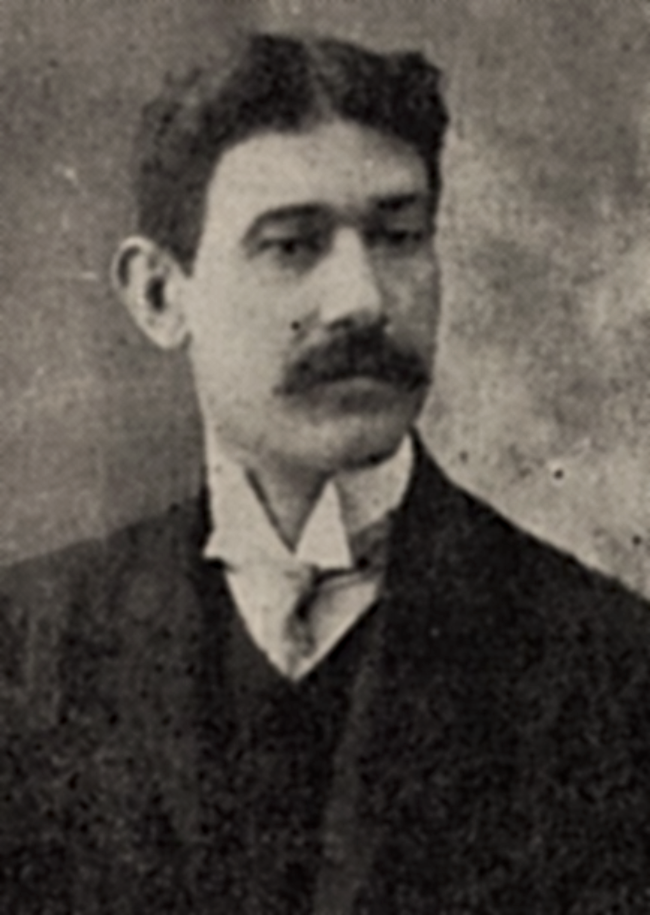
Alexandru Antemireanu in 1909

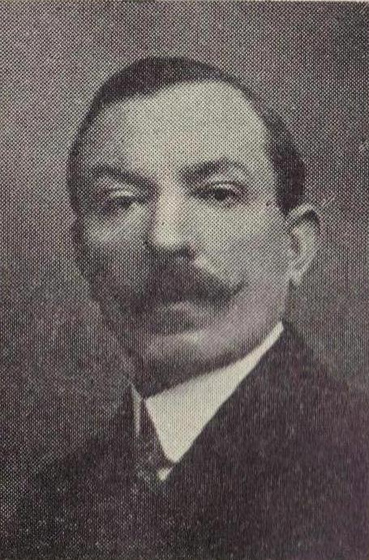
Ioan A. Bassarabescu c. 1900

George Coșbuc (portrait by Horațiu Dimitriu), 1918

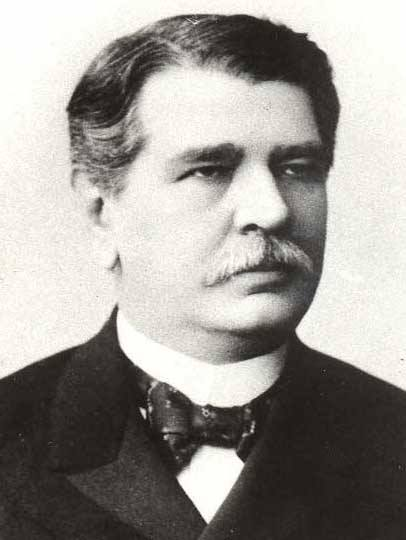
Anghel Demetriescu in 1900

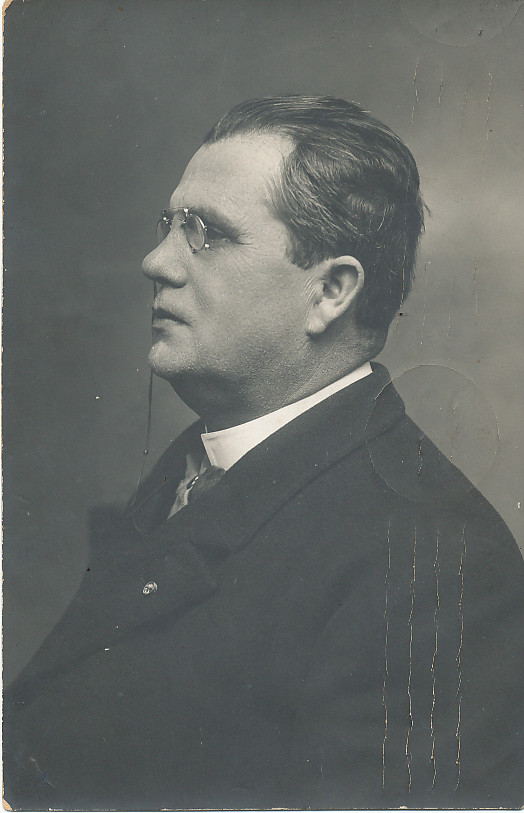
Emanuil Grigorovitza in 1912

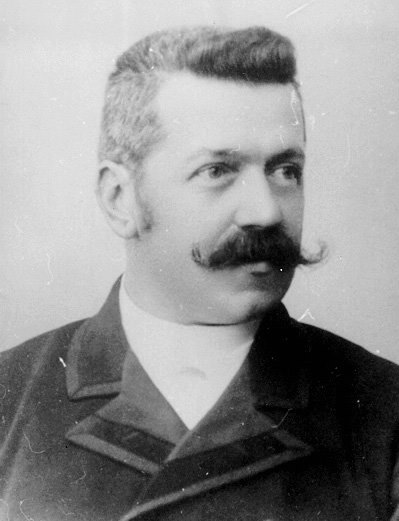
George Ionescu-Gion c. 1900

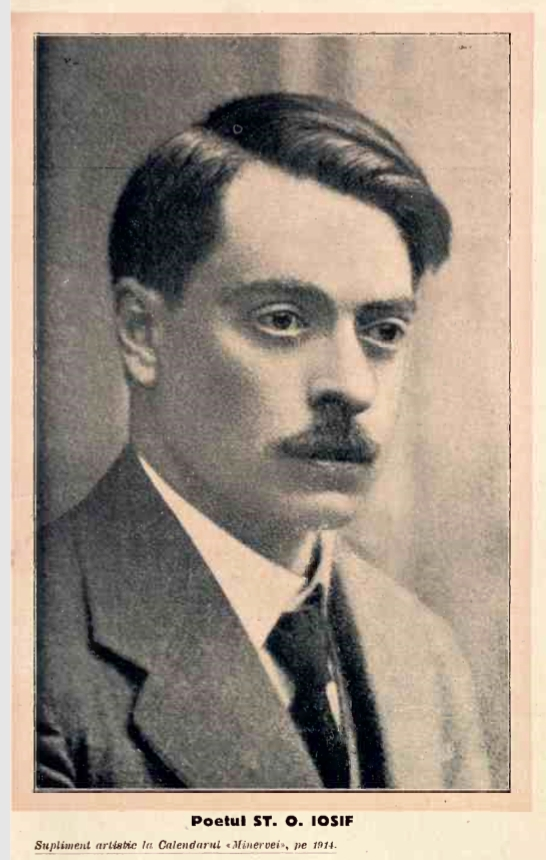
Ștefan Octavian Iosif in 1914

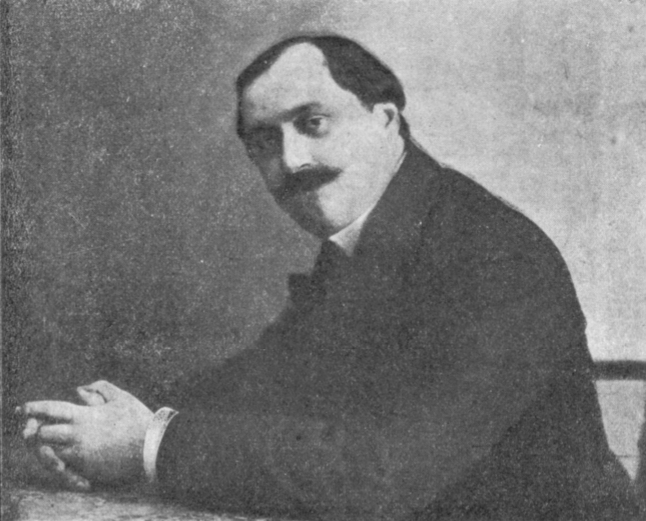
Dumitru Karnabatt in 1912

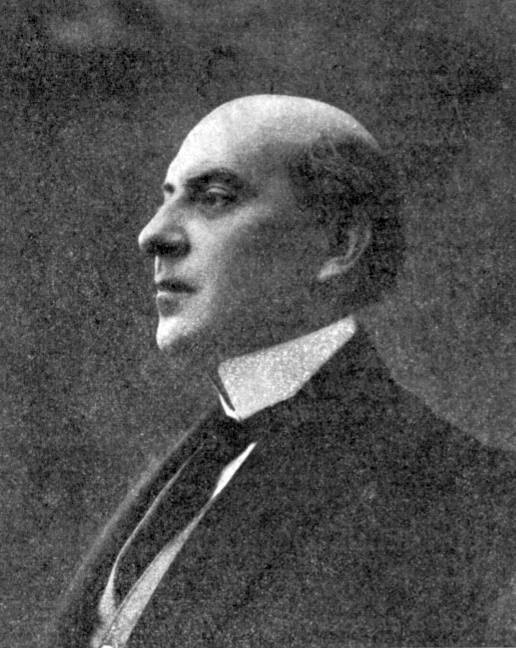
Cincinat Pavelescu c. 1910

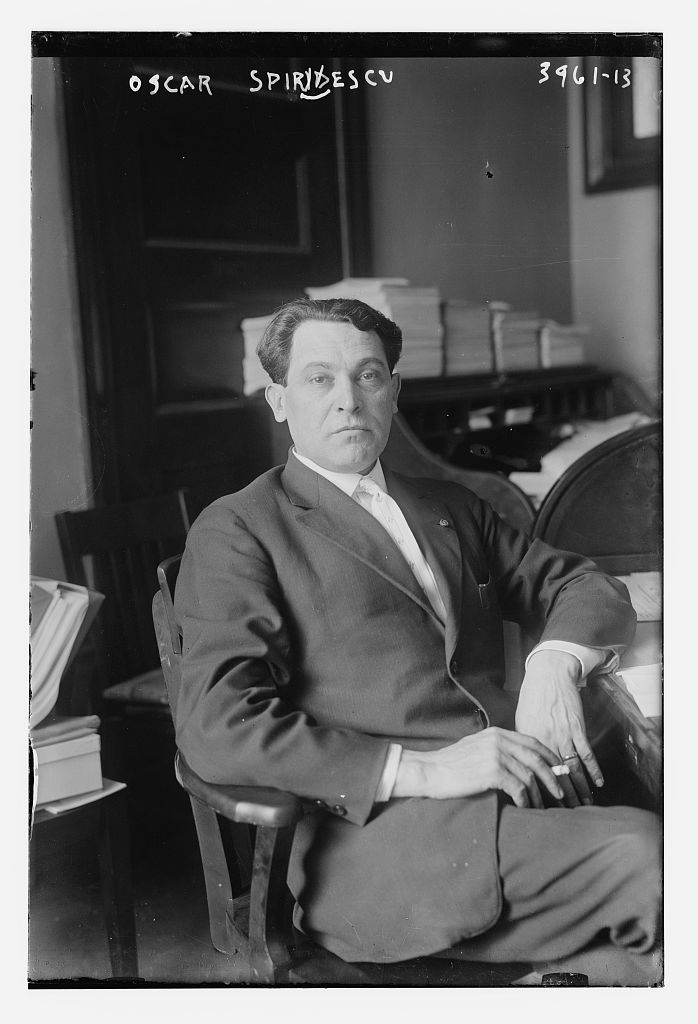
Oscar Spirescu in 1916

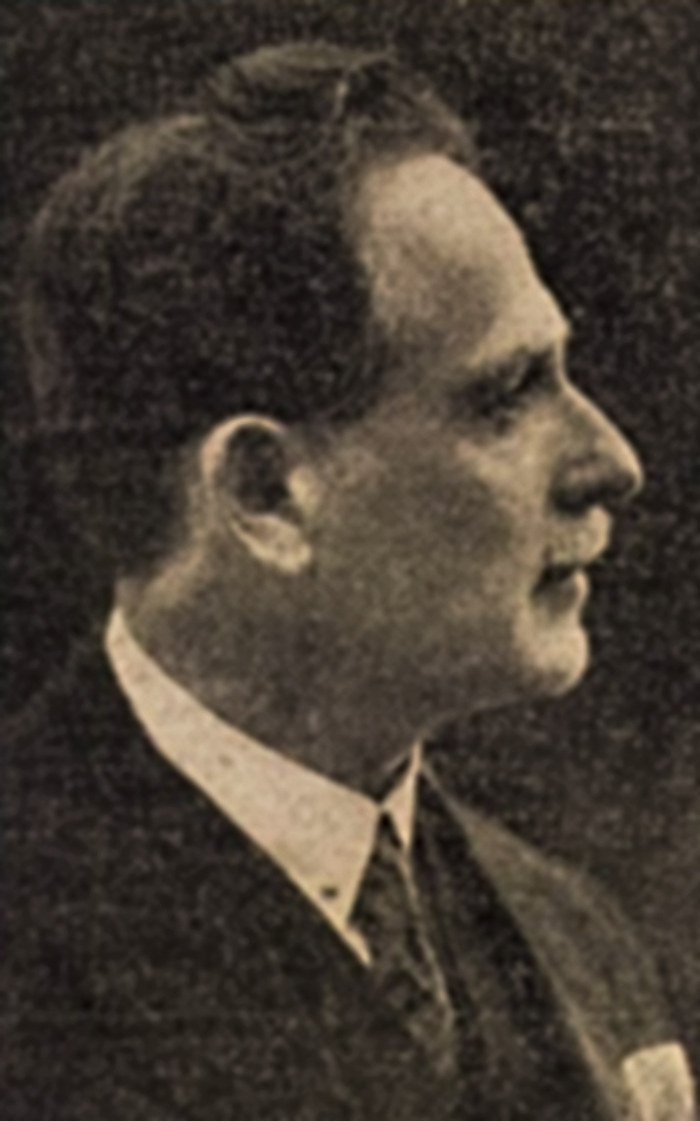
Alexandru Toma c. 1920

== Late-1890s disputes and decline ==
The PNL's first Sturdza cabinet fell in November 1896, largely as a result of agitation fomented by Filipescu and Lascăr Catargiu's Conservative factions. Both of the latter had demanded retribution for Ghenadie Petrescu, the deposed Metropolitan-Primate; though they managed to win over the public at large, they temporarily lost the Junimists, who found the affair to be entirely objectionable. In early 1897, as the PNL formed its second Sturdza cabinet, Epoca rallied with its critics. In April, after clashes between police agents and opposition groups, the authorities arrested the paper's proofreader, Atanase Ranetti-Picolo. The latter was defended by the Junimist daily, Timpul, as an innocent bystander. As members of the Epoca staff, Antemireanu and Vasile Demetrescu-Brăila joined in the nationalist agitation, which brought them into collision with Interior Minister, Mihail Pherekyde. According to Pherekyde's own report, in December 1897 the two men led a protest by the Cultural League for the Unity of All Romanians, which degenerated into violence after unidentified civilians tore apart the League's tricolor flag.

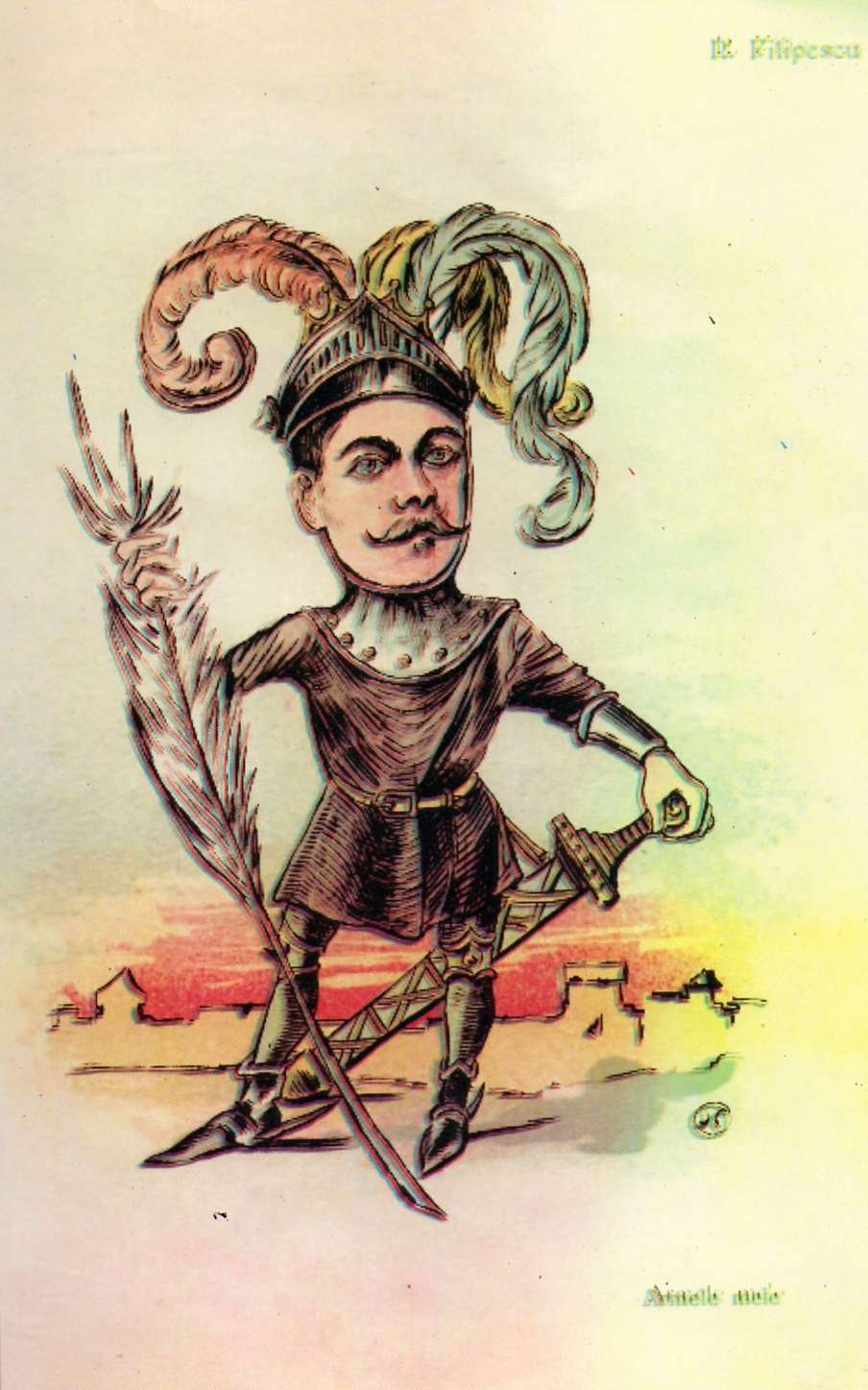
Nicolae Filipescu in a sympathetic 1898 caricature by Nicolae Petrescu Găină (titled Armele mele, or "My Weapons")

This period also witnessed Filipescu's January 1898 duel with Emanoil Lahovary, a frail and deformed politician who had criticized him in an editorial piece for L'Indépendence Roumaine. Lahovary's article was specifically about Epoca's politics, which the author called "quick-change". The Epoca owner killed his rival, and was subsequently sentenced to a six-months imprisonment at Văcărești. Maiorescu privately jubilated, since Filipescu's neutralization served Junimea's interests. Commenting on this issue, Ornea observes that Filipescu was indeed in "an inevitable eclipse" after that moment. Filipescu could hold on to municipal power as president of Bucharest's interim commission, even though, as the Kölnische Zeitung noted, "it had been considered impossible that [he] would hold public office again anytime soon."

As observed by the Kölnische Zeitung, Filipescu was turning Epoca into a venue for populist nationalism and antisemitism—stances which alienated Junimists, but were instead consonant with the more democratic wing of the Conservative Party, which had just recruited Fleva. The Frankfurter Zeitung stated similar claims, arguing that the Cultural League, now eclipsed in its anti-Magyarism by Dimitrie Sturdza and his ministers, had to be turned by Filipescu and others into a venue for antisemitic agitation. In summer 1898, Romania prepared for a golden jubilee of the Wallachian Revolution of 1848, transformed by government into a state-sponsored celebration of liberal ideology. Epoca opposed that trend, and, especially through Antemireanu, began publishing evidence about the forgotten, more conservative, contributors to the revolution, in particular Ion Heliade Rădulescu. Now firmly on the right of the political spectrum, Epoca was the first paper to call for an intervention against the PSDMR, which was organizing "peasant clubs" to increase its share of the vote.

Epoca's scrutiny of the Jewish community was more specifically turning into anti-Zionism, at a time when many Jews began emigrating into Palestine. As an organizer of the latter, Samuel Pineles complained about having been dragged into "unpleasant polemics" with Epoca, which had accused him of having a financial stake in the affair. In some contexts, the newspaper still censured antisemitic excesses. In May 1899, after participants in a nationalist rally had vandalized Jewish-owned shops in Iași, Epoca circulated rumors that the affair had been engineered by the PNL's local leadership, nominating Gheorghe Mârzescu as the main culprit. By then, Epoca was losing its previous team of writers, beginning with Caragiale. As recounted by Toma, Caragiale could not stomach Filipescu's antisemitism, which had come to target Caragiale's other Jewish friend, Ronetti Roman; when he left, it was to set up his own review, Calendarul Dacia, which republished his Epoca articles.

== Between Pisani and Maiorescu ==
On 7 July 1900, Filipescu became Minister of Agriculture in the first Carp cabinet, and was obliged by law to sell of his interest in the paper; Pisani became the nominal owner. During the Junimist interlude, Epoca applauded the balanced budget and the sale of government assets, declaring itself saturated by the "monotonous song" from the PNL benches, which were calling for careful assessment of what was being lost. Carp's hold on power was ended in early 1901 by a PNL return, with the third Sturdza cabinet organizing recall elections. In the aftermath, Epoca investigated supposed treason in the Junimist ranks, alleging that Iacob Lahovary had used the opportunity to undermine right-wing unity. At the time, Filipescu reported that he was in possession of an article that Lahovary had sent to Epoca, which was never published, and which reprimanded the Conservative chairman, Gheorghe Grigore Cantacuzino. The newspaper also retained its position regarding Carol, whom its staff viewed as too friendly toward the PNL. In September 1901, Jean Miclescu (already noted as a leader of the Conservatives' republican minority) was hosted with an editorial on "the moral crisis", which was primarily an answer to claims made by the staunchly monarchist Prime Minister Sturdza; therein, Miclescu argued that the king had done little to elevate Romania's standing. At the same time, Alexandru Marghiloman, who was emerging as leader of the Conservative faction, personally sent notes about the party's congresses of 1901–1911, which Pisani then published as unsigned reportage pieces or opinions.

For a while during the early 1900s, the Junimists parted ways with the Conservatives, seeking to establish themselves as powerbrokers. Filipescu drew suspicion from opposition groups, on the Conservative right as well as on the populist left, that he was being protected by Sturdza, and as such friendly toward the PNL. A May 1902 attack on the opposition's Adevărul was blamed by such critics on Antemireanu and Filipescu, seen in that context as government stooges. In November 1903, Pisani leased Epoca to a triumvirate of Junimists: Filipescu, Maiorescu, and Marghiloman. Maiorescu made special efforts to control the editorial line, assigning editorial work to Alexandru G. Florescu. Already in December 1903, Maiorescu declared himself satisfied that Epoca was a fully Junimist institution, with ideologically convenient contributions by Delavrancea, Stavri Predescu, Emanuel Antonescu, Constantin C. Arion, Mihail Dragomirescu, George Ranetti, Constantin Litzica, Simion Mehedinți, and Alexandru Tzigara-Samurcaș. More in detail, however, Epoca illustrated tensions between the club's inner groups, particularly after Dragomirescu used it for a series of articles that praised Ronetti Roman in terms that ended up annoying other Junimists.

The Junimist deal lasted for exactly a year, after which Pisani resumed full control of the paper. At that stage, Nicolae Iorga was the paper's leading writer on literary topics, while Octavian Goga had a long series of articles which supported the emancipation of Romanians in Transylvania and other parts of Austria-Hungary. During his tenure (March–October 1902), Iorga made it clear that he intended to make Epoca into an organ of "Romanianism" and "new nationalism", explicitly directed against Junimea's penchant for cosmopolitanism. Though Iorga established his own Democratic Nationalist Party, he continued to be intensely courted by Filipescu, who wanted him to reinforce the Conservatives' populist right. The Iorga line was also followed by the young Epoca journalist G. Ranetti, with a series of articles that praised nationalist students for boycotting French-language plays at the National Theater Bucharest.

In 1900–1904, the Junimist Tzigara-Samurcaș held a permanent chronicle in Epoca. Here, he discussed art exhibits by artists ranging from Nicolae Grigorescu to Arthur Verona, supported reconstruction on Stavropoleos Church as a "national museum", and engaged in a bitter polemic with rival scholar Grigore Tocilescu—against whom he also filed a criminal complaint. In 1904, the writing staff was joined by other young literary critics: Eugen Lovinescu, Petre V. Haneș, and D. Ionescu-Morel. Lovinescu was especially active, with articles that were later collected as Pași pe nisip ("Footsteps on Sand"). Those these pieces were not the programmatic defenses of literary modernism that marked Lovinescu's later work, they already challenged Iorga's tenets, causing the latter to express his indignation. Also then, as a feuilleton, Epoca was putting out Radu Rosetti's debut historical novel, Cu paloșul.

Junimist and post-Junimist teams (1903–1904)
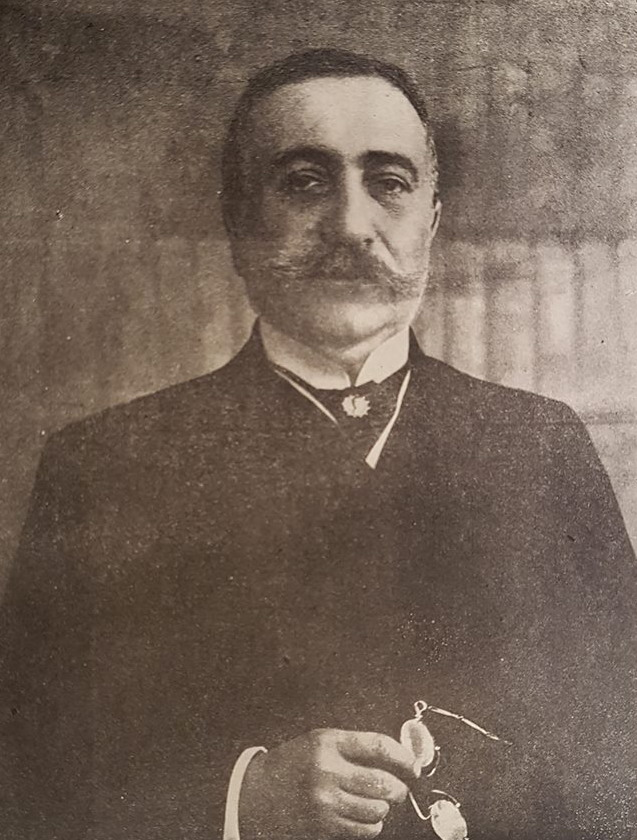
Constantin C. Arion in 1918

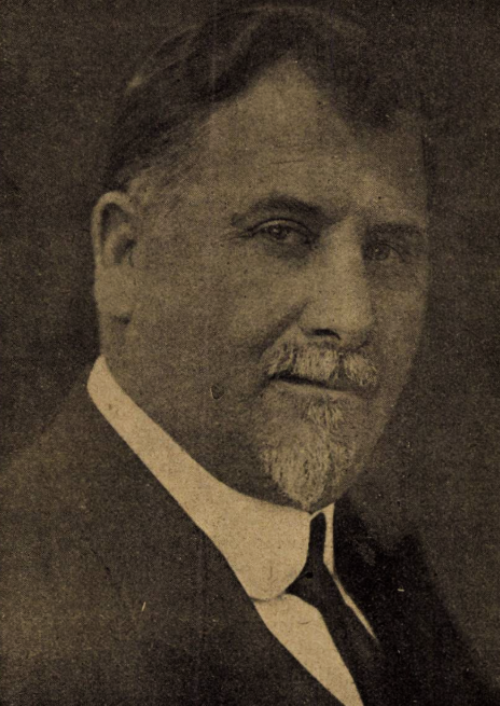
Mihail Dragomirescu c. 1910

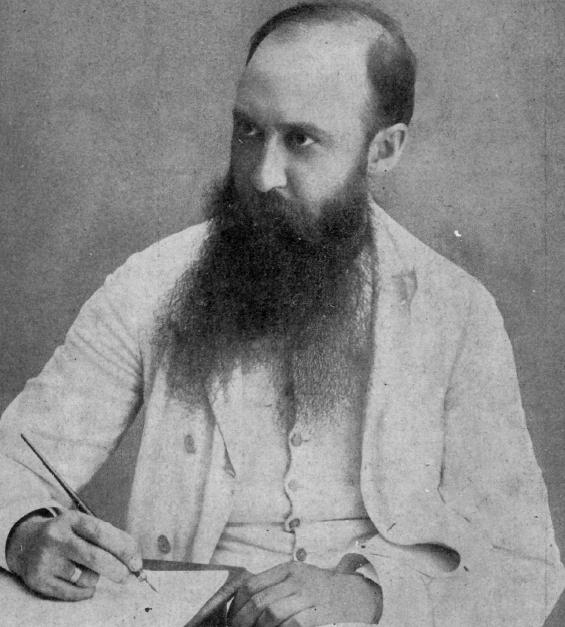
Nicolae Iorga in 1914

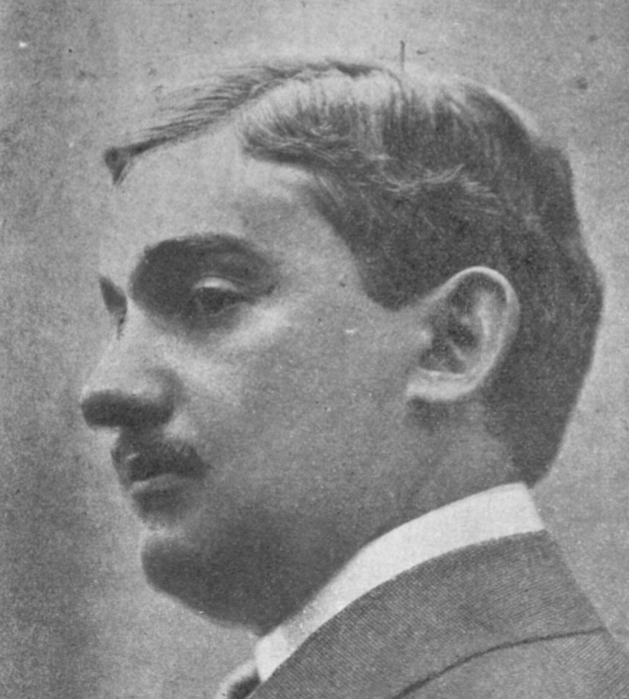
Eugen Lovinescu in 1912

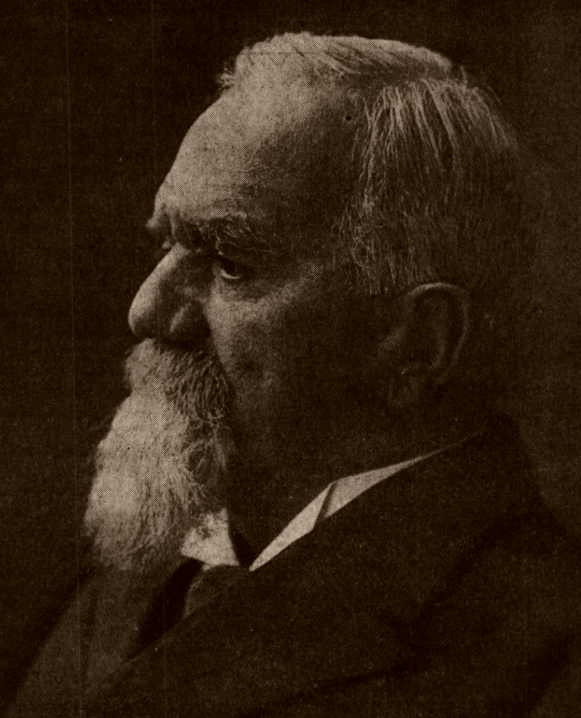
Titu Maiorescu in 1913

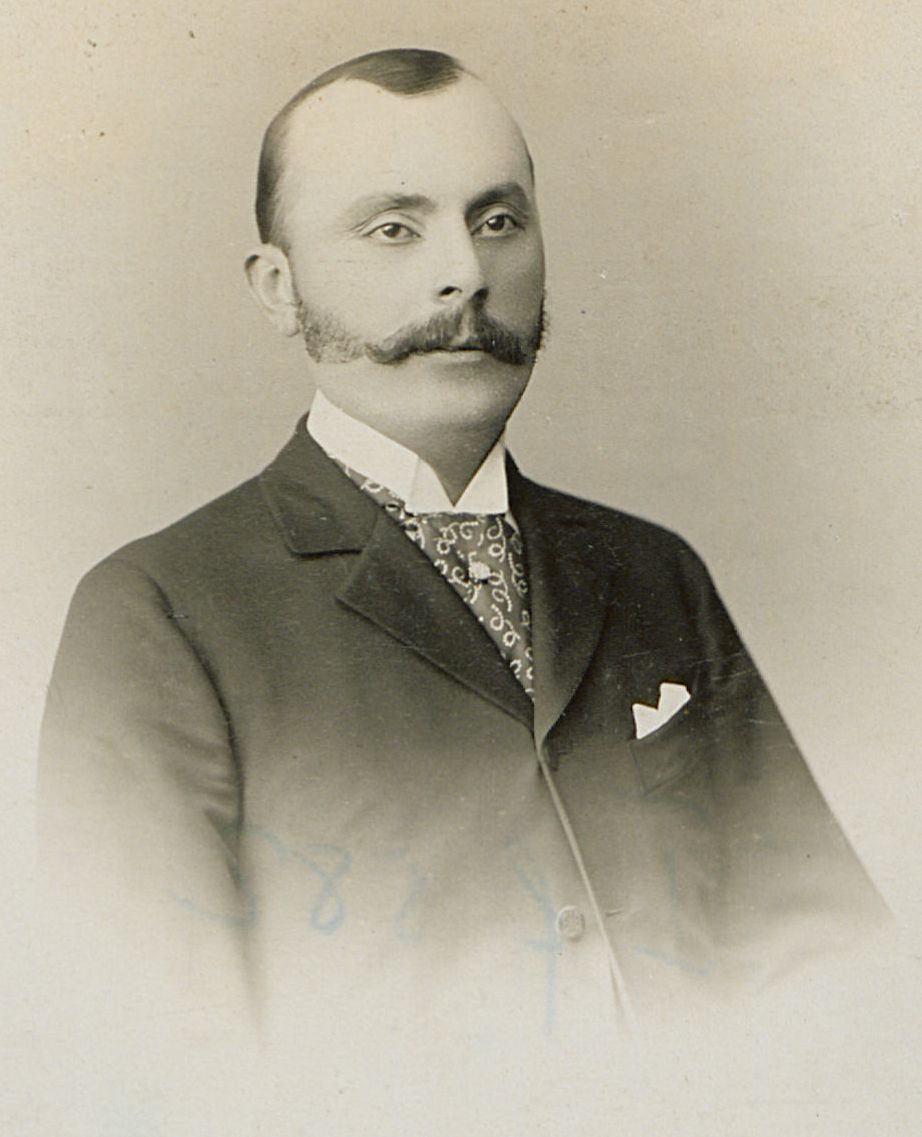
Alexandru Marghiloman in 1916

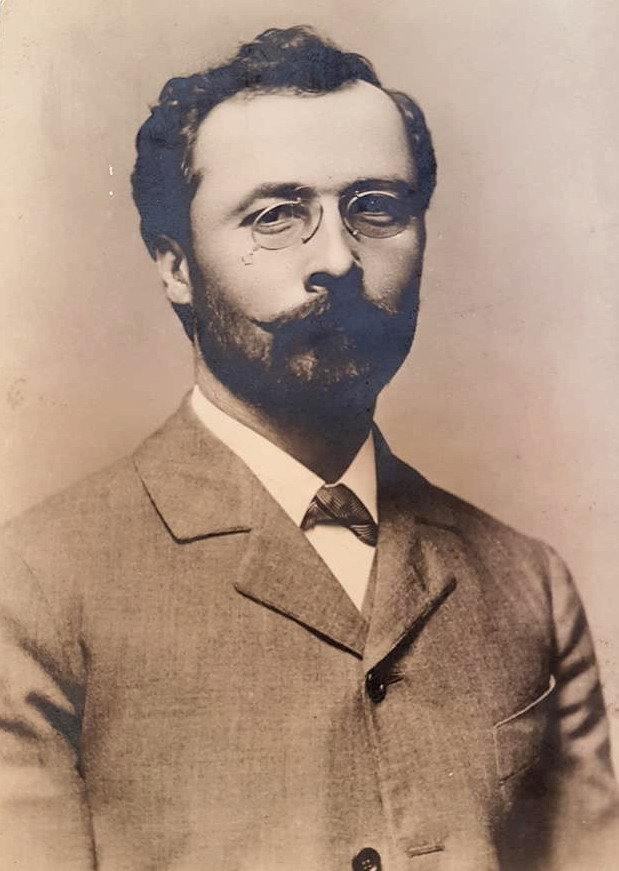
Simion Mehedinți in 1918

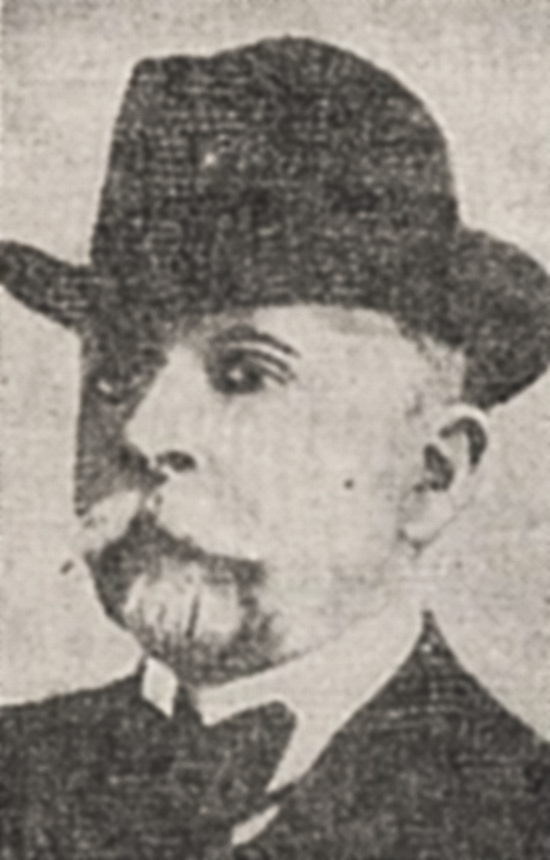
Jean Miclescu in 1913

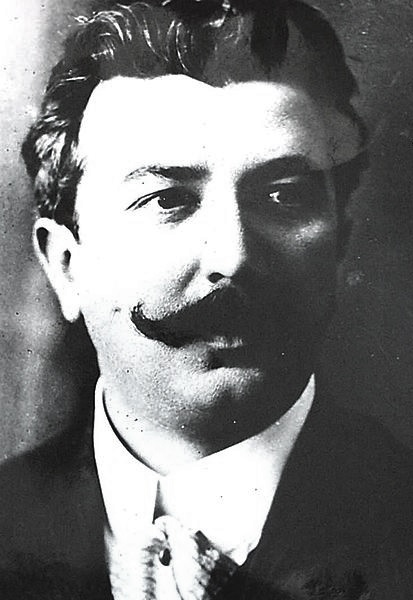
George Ranetti c. 1910

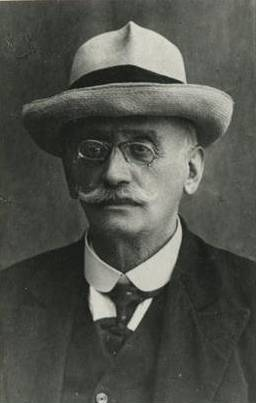
Radu Rosetti c. 1920

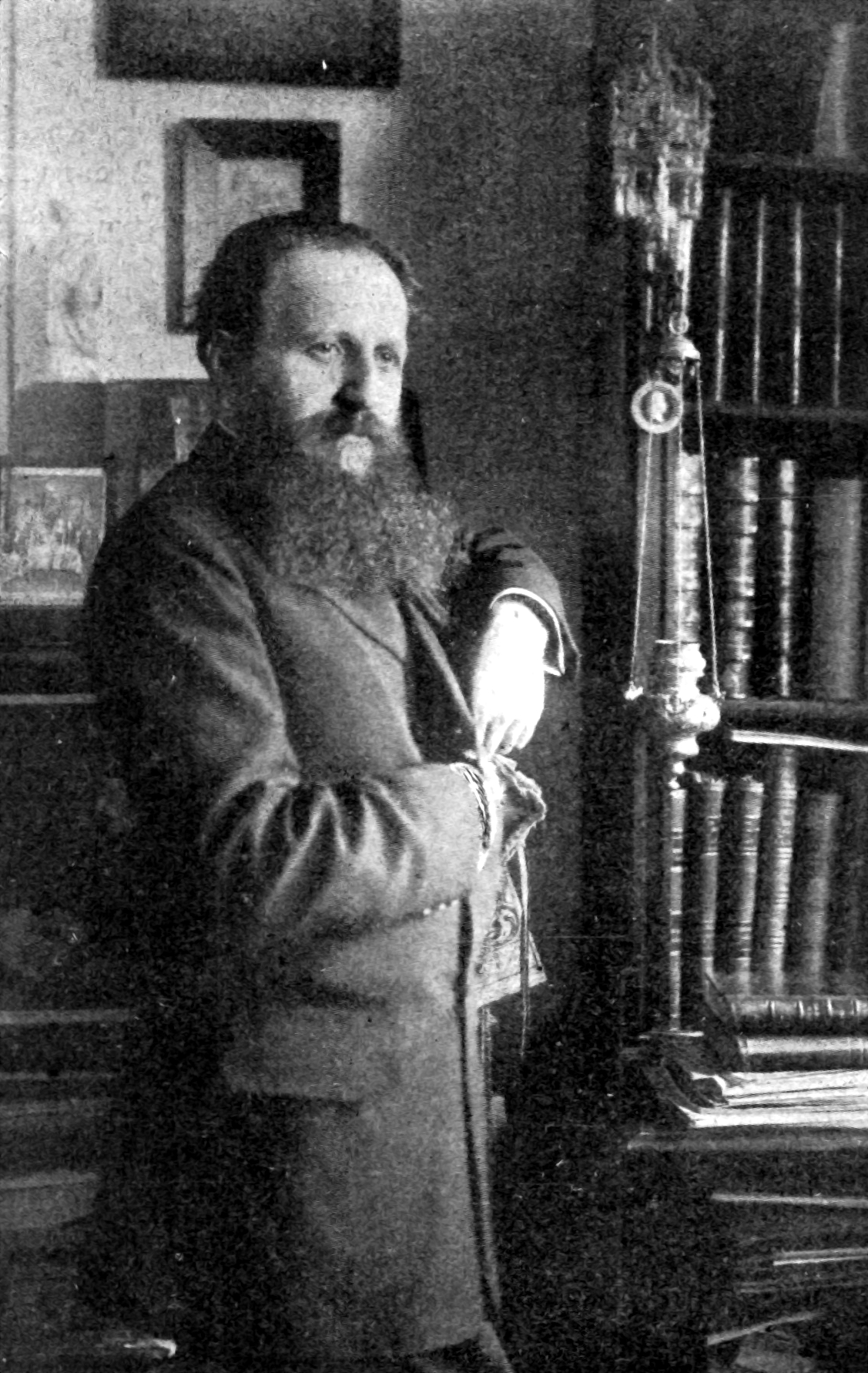
Alexandru Tzigara-Samurcaș in 1912

== 1907 revolt and aftermath ==
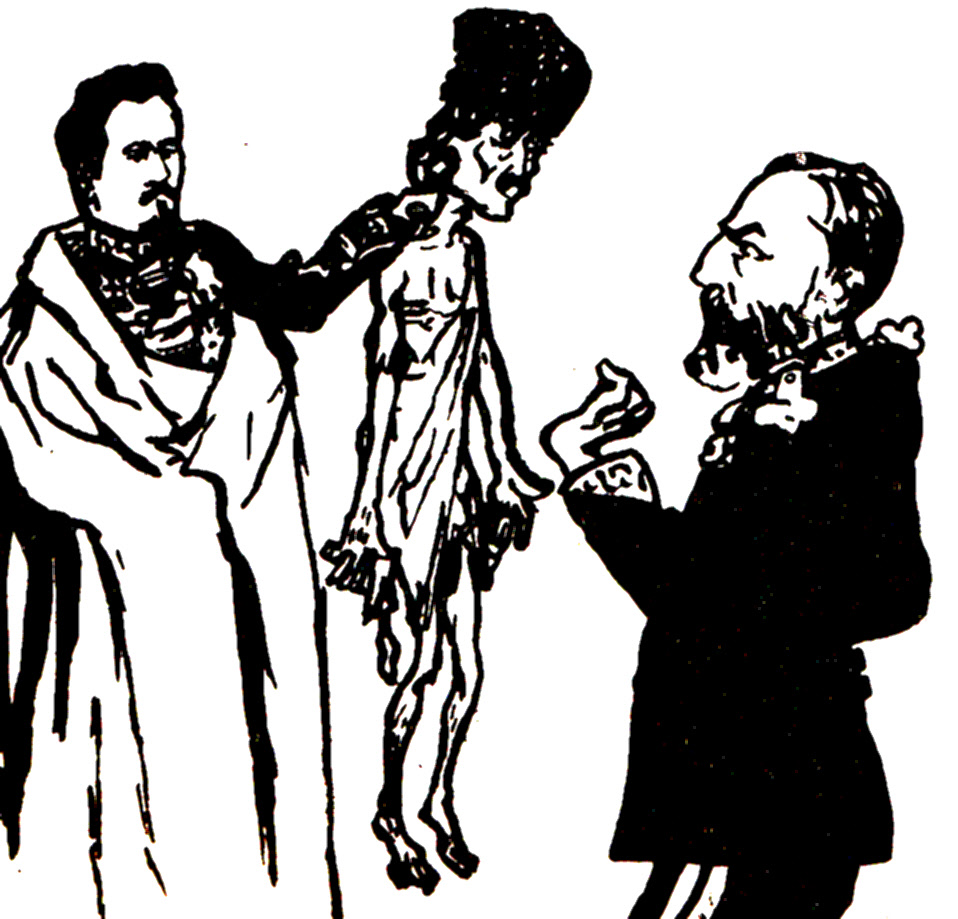
Anonymous cartoon in Protestarea (1906): an emaciated peasant, held up by Alexandru Ioan Cuza for Carol I to acknowledge

In 1905–1907, there was another visible rapprochement between the Filipescu–Pisani group and the mainline Junimea, leading historian Vasile Liveanu to describe Epoca as a "Junimist newspaper". Like the Junimists, Filipescu opposed the Conservative-run second Cantacuzino cabinet; he strongly resented the Justice Minister, Alexandru Bădărău, depicting him as enormously corrupt. As a correspondent for the General-Anzeiger observed, such "blatant accusations" did little to harm the minister's reputation "in this country, where there is virtually no freedom of the press". In February 1906, Filipescu no longer contained his anger, calling Bădărău a "swindler" (pungaș) to his face, which resulted in Bădărău offering to duel him. The General-Anzeiger believed that public opinion and the monarch were entirely against Filipescu.

In January 1907, Epoca also hosted a political essay by the Junimist historian Teohari Antonescu, as Lupta și credința noastră ("Our Combat and Credo"). This text was ridiculed on behalf of the Conservatives by Lascăr Antoniu, who argued that its "pompous" verbiage clashed badly with the Junimist tradition of concise lucidity. Epoca also serialized an essay by Vasile Kogălniceanu. The latter was proposing a gradual land reform that would have reduced the estates of Conservative landowners while empowering the sharecroppers, he was soon after arrested as an alleged instigator of the large-scale peasant uprising. In leftist circles, Filipescu and Epoca were also suspected of having set up the republican magazine Protestarea, in turn seen as duping "the popular masses" into voting the Junimea way; the Conservatives meanwhile, believed that it was sponsored by Miclescu. Managed by G. Ranetti, Protestarea reportedly failed to convince its target audience, and was closed down, possibly by Filipescu, in mid-1908.

Officially, however, Epoca took up the cause of order and loyalism. In March, when the troubles came to be documented, the paper hypothesized that populists Bădărău and Take Ionescu, who were now breaking away from the Conservative mainstream, had instigated them. In one such piece, it openly demanded why the peasants had been supported by rioting students at the University of Iași, "who are known supporters of Bădărău". This chain of accusations was received with strong criticism by the Bădărău's paper Opinia, who called it "yet another infamy, audaciously delivered by that little dictator's gazette".

In other contexts, Epoca suggested that Ionescu's faction had not ignited the revolt, but had rather pushed it along by exploiting the peasants. On the PNL side, Voința Națională daily quoted and endorsed an Epoca report which suggested that the peasants of Săbăoani had taken up arms only after one of Ionescu's deputies had rigged a public-land auction. Soon after, the same paper asked Epoca to refrain from its constant digs at the new Sturdza cabinet, which "works to calm down the rebels, either through armed intervention or through the solemn promises of [its agrarian] manifesto". According to Voința Națională, Filipescu had made Epoca into an "unpatriotic" venue, "the instigator and agitator of the tenant farmers and landowners, against precisely those measures that government has taken." In April, Epoca redirected focus on the PNL itself, declaring that Spiru Haret, the Education Minister, was "one of those to blame for the March events." In tandem, government sources began looking back on Kogălniceanu's articles in Epoca as a prelude to the riots; Conservative gazettes dismissed this interpretation, now suggesting that insidious "word-of-mouth propaganda" had encouraged the peasants.

From early 1908, Filipescu and Epoca were also seeking to weaken Ionescu's new Conservative-Democratic Party (PCD), which was emerging as a populist force on the right. In that context, it hosted an article by Mircea Demetriade, describing Ionescu as a modern-day Alcibiades. The Epoca group was however opposed to the more radicalized Junimists around Carp, condemning them for having suggested that a foreign army should have intervened to repress the peasants. Some of Filipescu's ire was reserved for the old Epoca editor Alexandru Vlahuță—whose poems expressed admiration for the peasant insurgents. One of these works appeared in Viața Romînească, a left-wing magazine; the latter was subsequently denounced by Epoca as an "anarchist" venue. Viața Romînească's staff writer replied that no Romanian magazine could have afforded to pass on any poem by Vlahuță, regardless of its content. In August 1907, Epoca published rumors out of Râmnicu Sărat, alleging that the peasants were preparing another uprising. The claim was received with skepticism by the left-wingers at Adevărul, who noted that the evidence of such activity was suspicious, and likely fabricated.

== Against Poporanism ==
From September 1909, Epoca was at the center of a major scandal, one that tested the attitudes of Romanian nationalists in regard to the Russian Empire. At the time, Romania had taken in many Romanian-speaking refugees from the Russian Empire—generally identified as Bessarabians, due to mostly originating in the Bessarabia Governorate, which was still regarded in Bucharest as a Romanian irredenta. Epoca's own staff included the Bessarabian Gheorghe V. Madan, though, unbeknownst to his colleagues, he was an agent provocateur of the Russian secret police. Acting in conjunction with Pavel Krushevan, Madan publicized claims that Constantin Stere, who represented the PNL's Bessarabian faction, had defrauded the Zemstvo of Kishinev. The PNL's own Viitorul hosted Stere's responses, as well as other articles, which questioned Madan's own reputation. These also observed that, at Epoca, Madan was circulating opinions that agreed with the tenets of Tsarist autocracy, in that he was describing Stere as a radical enemy of social order. Madan himself proudly admitted that he was being employed by the imperial censorship apparatus in vetting Romanian books for circulation in Bessarabia. The Bessarabian scandal was followed by agents of Romania's own secret police, the Siguranța, who expressed amazement that Filipescu's publication, "which likes to parade its nationalism", had even hosted Madan's pieces. Such sources speculated that Filipescu had been blinded by his rage toward the PNL.

Also in 1909, Epoca was giving ample exposure to the novelist and polemicist Duiliu Zamfirescu, with articles supporting the classical Junimist take on culture (which favored art for art's sake) and openly mocking Stere and Viața Romînească's "Poporanism" (which insisted on social realism and didacticism). In its literary pages, the daily, like Zamfirescu himself, favored Ion Al-George's neo-romantic and neoclassical poetry, which had only some hints of Symbolism. In its selective polemics of the period, it sometimes contradicted its own nationalist agenda. In October 1910, it aired G. Ranetti's response to his Transylvanian critic, Liviu Rebreanu; though Rebreanu had only commented on Ranetti's mistakes as a translator, the latter responded with a personal attack, and in the process suggested that the Austro-Hungarian authorities had been right to detain Rebreanu. The article greatly affected Rebreanu's reputation, and he was always disappointed with Ranetti.

In 1908–1910, the PNL's new chairman, Ion I. C. Brătianu, governed Romania through his first and second cabinets; Haret returned at the Education Ministry. A controversy opposed him to the Orthodox prelate Gherasim Safirin, who had issued anathemas against civilian interference in religious affairs. Epoca and the Conservatives were on Safirin's side, habitually mocking Haret's attempts to diffuse the situation. Also then, Epoca became noted for its strong anti-Catholicism, triggered when Joseph Baud, a chanoine of the local Catholic community, bragged to Seara journal that Orthodox Metropolitan Calinic Miclescu had accepted conversion on his deathbed. The Epoca team, as an Orthodox-led paper, virulently rejected this account in articles that habitually described Baud and his correligionists as "Papists" and "legatees of Loyola", also implying that Catholicism was were merely tolerated on Romanian soil.

At the height of their conflict with Haret and the Poporanists, Filipescu and his staffers were turning against other left-wing factions: in October 1909, they denounced unionizers at the Romanian Railways Company, depicting them too as "anarchists", and tracing their links to the socialist Christian Rakovsky. Such claims were answered on behalf of the workers by Dimitrie Marinescu, who called Epoca a "reactionary rag", suggesting that it aimed to get the PNL to do its job in quashing unionization. Shortly after, Filipescu was ridiculed by the PNL press for his expressions of love toward the proletariat, which he saw as threatened by "pretend workers". According to such critics, he only courted that class because it could increase his margin in Ilfov County's by-election. The paper was itself hit by the mounting wave of unionist activity. In June 1910, the workers at Gheorghe Ionescu's print shop, who were putting out Epoca, suddenly went on strike, demanding increased pay. This resulted in Epoca issuing a single-page issue for 22 June. Upon reappearing in a full-content form, it denounced the six-day week as a dangerous innovation.

Anti-Poporanist contributors of 1909–1910
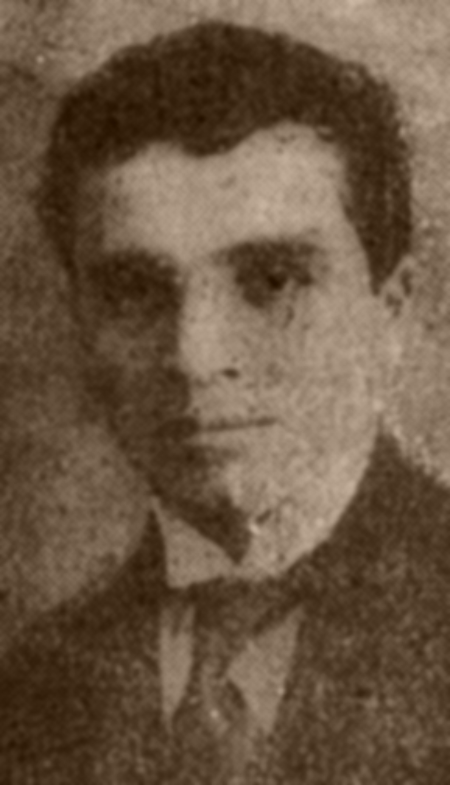
Ion Al-George in 1914

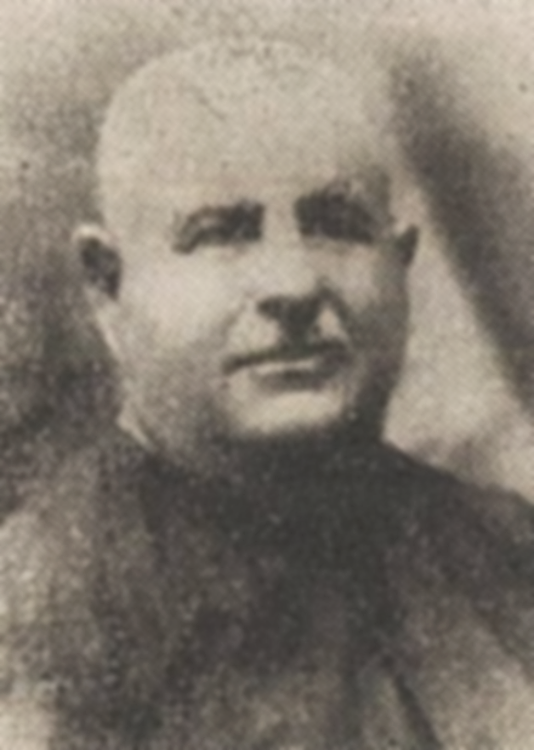
Gheorghe V. Madan in 1936

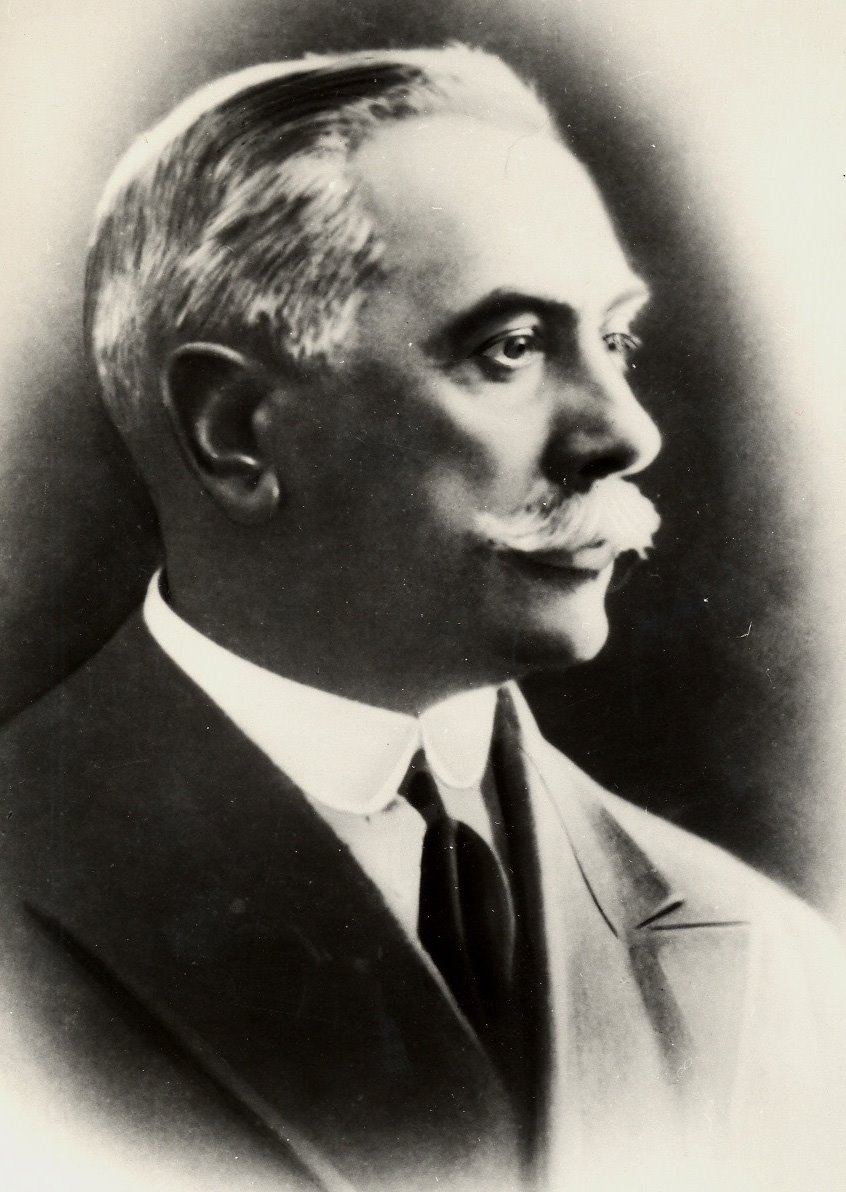
Duiliu Zamfirescu c. 1920

== Balkan crises and break with Junimea ==
In 1910–1912, Filipescu was serving as Minister of War in the Junimists' second Carp cabinet. In that context, he vexed the Conservative base, as well as King Carol, by openly discussing (including with interventions in Epoca) the 1907 revolt and its death toll. Opinia, which spoke for the PCD, quipped that Filipescu was not, as expected, a "civilian minister of war", but rather a "minister of civil war". In the Assembly, PNL man Constantin Banu commented at length on the implicit paradox: Filipescu was declaring himself horrified by the death toll of repression, but, during the actual events, had campaigned for more violence.

Pisani also gained more exposure as a politician after the elections of March 1911, when he took a seat in the Assembly of Deputies. His newspaper grew more prosperous after accepting a stipend from the extremely rich former Premier, Cantacuzino. In 1912, the editorial staff working under Pisani was made up of: Constantin Gongopol (as editorial secretary), Panait Macri, Barbu Voinescu, Ranetti-Picolo, Rudolf Uhrinowsky, M. Conitz, and C. Deleanu; N. Ținc was the proofreader. At that stage, new contributors included a dramatist and theater columnist, A. de Herz. In July 1912, after coordinating with Alexandru Tzigara-Samurcaș, Epoca's writers managed to interrupt the project to rebuild Bucharest City Hall, accusing architect Petre Antonescu of having obtained it illegally. The group was friendly toward some sections of the PNL, especially after the Conservatives had to maintain the same strictures of policy in the Safirin affair. In December 1912, Epoca publicly mourned the recently deceased Haret as a great patriot.

Filipescu's nationalists and classical conservatives (who were now led by Maiorescu, Marghiloman, and other members of Junimea) disputed each other over control of Epoca; affiliates of the former camp were increasingly critical of the Junimist support for an alliance with the Triple Alliance. Pisani always allowed ample coverage to Filipescu's divergent opinions, which mentioned the distress of Romanians in Austria-Hungary—primarily those of Transylvania. Epoca tested the second Maiorescu cabinet by demanding a sponsorship from the Foreign Ministry, which the Junimists refused to grant. At that stage, Filipescu was again a target of Russian interference: also in 1912, Epoca hired another Bessarabian, Ilie Cătărău, who was a double agent for Russian intelligence and the Siguranța; he was the paper's correspondent in Serbia, sending back notes about the First Balkan War.

The crisis was prolonged by a Second Balkan War. Filipescu initially resigned his position in the cabinet, since he believed that his superiors were not hawkish enough in their treatment of Bulgaria. In May 1913, after Romania had formally demanded Silistra from Bulgaria, Epoca lamented, suggesting that only the annexation of Southern Dobruja would have sufficed. In summer, after diplomatic relations between the two countries had given way to a state of war and most of reporters had been mobilized for military service, Elena Caragiani served as the newspaper's front-line correspondent; Epoca also began scrutinizing the various teams of rival reporters for unpatriotic acts, and claimed to have exposed therein a Jewish draft-dodger, Mendel Grünberg-Millian. That August, Filipescu himself published in Epoca a widely quoted article that demanded even closer coordination with Serbia and the Kingdom of Greece.

Epoca was present for the peace negotiations in Bucharest, where Pisani claimed to have been prioritized, among all other reporters, by Greece's popular Prime Minister, Eleftherios Venizelos. It and Viitorul were instead snubbed by Ionescu, who went on a mission to Greece as Maiorescu's envoy. Both gazettes expressed displeasure that Ionescu's press team comprised two Jews, namely Albert Honigman of Adevărul and Iosif Fermo of Universul. In December 1913, the paper attracted international attention for publicizing Filipescu's denunciations of Austria-Hungary as an adversarial ally, who had not sufficiently backed Romania's expedition (while continuously persecuting its Romanian communities), and of the Triple Alliance as its tool. Cătărău took his nationalist commitment further, and is widely seen as responsible for two bomb attacks on Hungarian soil, one of which killed several people in Debrecen. Journalists beginning with Em. C. Grigoraș speculated that he was acting on behalf of warmongers, who finally got their wish with the assassination at Sarajevo.

Balkan Wars-era team
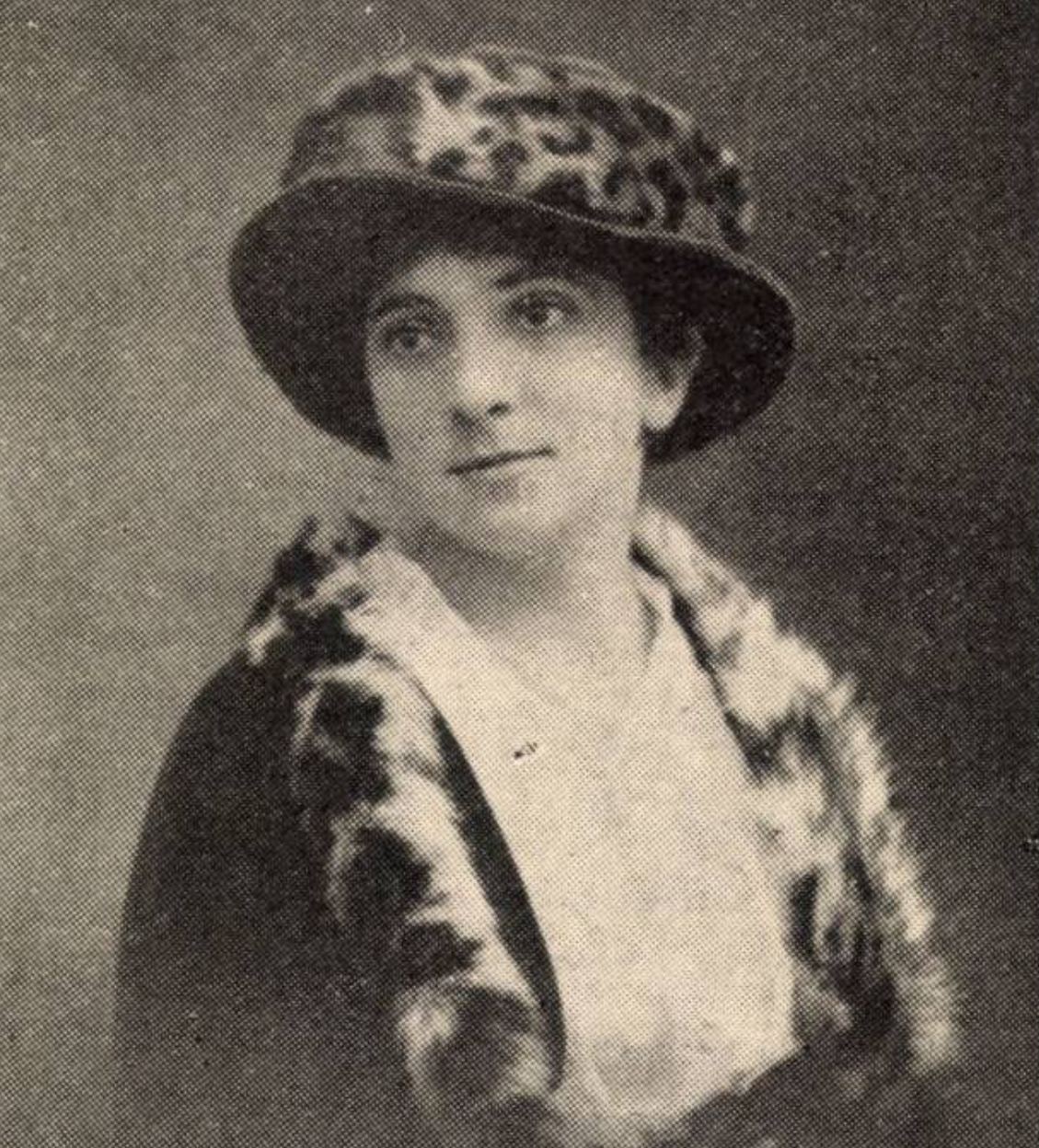
Elena Caragiani c. 1910

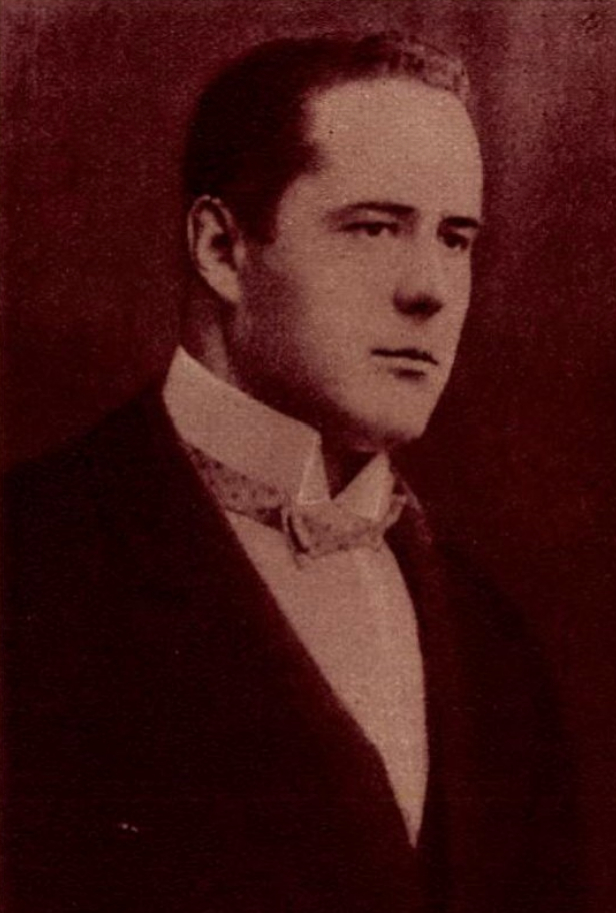
Ilie Cătărău c. 1914

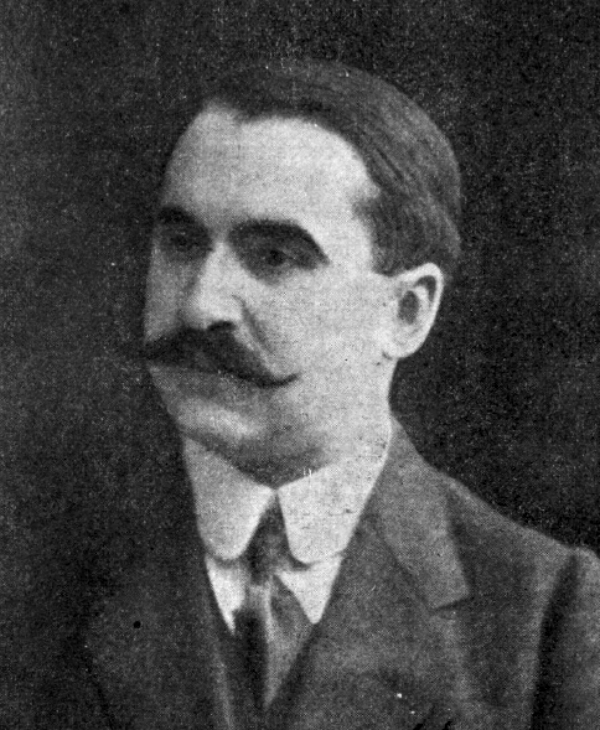
A. de Herz in 1912

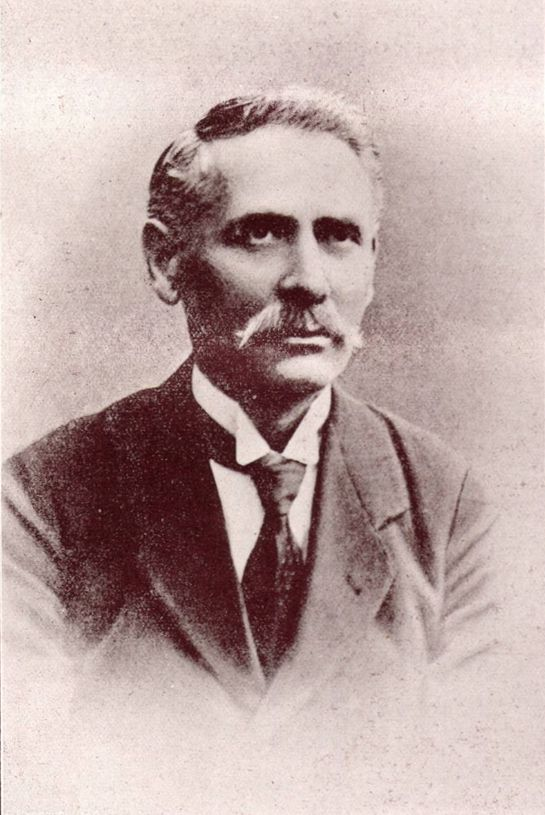
Panait Macri in 1915

== Neutrality years ==
The clash of geopolitical visions was exacerbated after the outbreak of hostilities in mid-1914. As Romania maintained non-belligerence, public opinion was sharply divided between those who endorsed the Entente and those who campaigned for neutrality or, as "Germanophiles", for engagement alongside the Central Powers. Initially, Epoca gave coverage to both sides of the debate; in August 1914, when he had been appointed head of the Romanian Red Cross, Marghiloman asked Pisani to host an homage to Disconto-Gesellschaft of Imperial Germany, which had agreed to sponsor his humanitarian effort. Any such overtures were curbed by Filipescu. In January 1915, he wrote in Epoca that war against Austria-Hungary was a matter of national necessity, adding: "The only doubts I still had on this subject were as to why we had not gone to war even earlier." Also then, the newspaper published claims that the ruling class of co-belligerent Hungary wanted out of the war, which it saw as inevitably lost.

In contrast to the Filipescu-led dissidents, Marghiloman was emerging as the leading Germanophile. He ended up having a publicized and increasingly vitriolic dispute with Pisani, which almost resulted in the two of them dueling each other in May 1915. Around then, Epoca was sponsoring Gabriel Dichter, a Frenchman who supported the Ententist cause, to serve as its special envoy in Paris. Some early contributors returned to Epoca in 1915, as with the aged Delavrancea. He was mocked in the left-wing magazine Chemarea as having revealed diplomatic secrets in his political contributions to Filipescu's paper. Delavrancea's last-ever story, Vacanție, appeared in Epoca's April 1916 feuilleton.

Epoca found itself on the same side of the dispute as Adevărul—both institutions popularized Goga's views on the Transylvanian question, and both were being chided for this by the neutralists at Ziua. In April 1915, Ziua suggested that both Ententist newspapers were essentially "Russophile"; it also observed that Goga's excoriations were exclusively aimed at Marghiloman—even though the neutralist line was also tacitly favored by the PNL and its government team. On 15 June, Epoca hosted an appeal, signed by Goga and Octavian Codru Tăslăuanu. The two Transylvanians asked their fellow Romanians to seize the moment, attack Austria-Hungary, and complete "the political unity of the Romanian nation" (or "Greater Romania"). Also around that time, Filipescu established the "National Action", an Ententist pressure-group, also joined by Epoca journalist Barbu Voinescu and by Constantin Argetoianu, who now began his own involvement with that paper. The coalition also counted on Avram Imbroane, who had fled the Banat in 1914. With his articles in Epoca and his speeches at Filipescu's rallies, he similarly argued for participation and annexation. This association then fused into the PCD, which became the "Conservative-Nationalist" group.

In September 1915, Epoca sparked controversy by claiming, through its founder's editorial, that Romania "was indeed bound to the Entente". On this point, it agreed with the Germanophile newspaper Seara, which was hosting revelations that officials of the Romanian Post had been "constantly supplying the English and Russian legations with messages [regarding] the dispositions made by the Romanian government. Government has been aware of this but has so far done nothing." Two months later, with Serbia facing annihilation, Filipescu reassured public opinion that Romania would allow the Imperial Russian Army passage into Bulgaria, as a way of opening a new front. During the early days of 1916, his paper applauded government's de-facto boycott on grain exports to Germany—according to German press reports, this stance caused an uproar, including among Epoca readers. In that context, Filipescu visited the Russian Front as a guest of the Tsarist government; according to Gazzetta di Parma, the German newspapers covered the visit with alarm, since Filipescu was "one of the most influential Romanian figures".

In June 1916, during the Brusilov offensive in Austrian-held Bukovina, Filipescu and his employees defended the Russian troops, which stood accused of having crossed into Dorohoi County. The German press observed that the Romanian public was incensed, and that Carp's paper, Moldova, was campaigning for Romania to conquer Bessarabia in revenge; Epoca, meanwhile, "emphasized that one could not act against Russia like a strictly neutral state, since an understanding had been reached with Russia. This is, of course, a blatant untruth, but it is intended to desensitize the people to the Russian aggression." Shortly after, with articles in Epoca, Filipescu was focusing his ire specifically on his former Junimist patron, also going after Moldova. In July, Epoca published a letter to Marghiloman, supposedly from an Austrian politician identified as "N. Hruschka". Denounced by Marghiloman himself as an "idiotic" forgery, it aimed to expose intrigues that existed at the heart of the Conservative Party, and to recruit Constantin C. Arion for the Entente.

Neutrality-era recruits
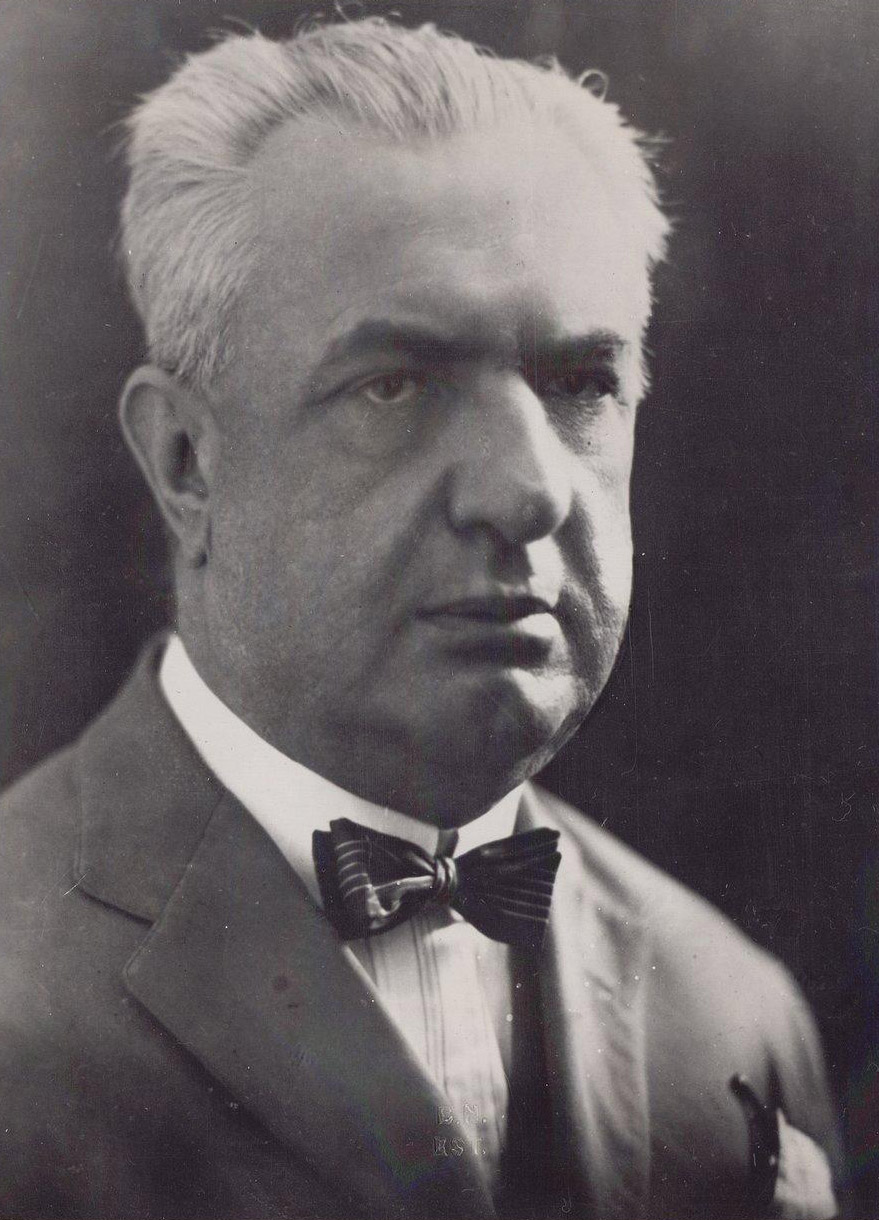
Constantin Argetoianu in 1925

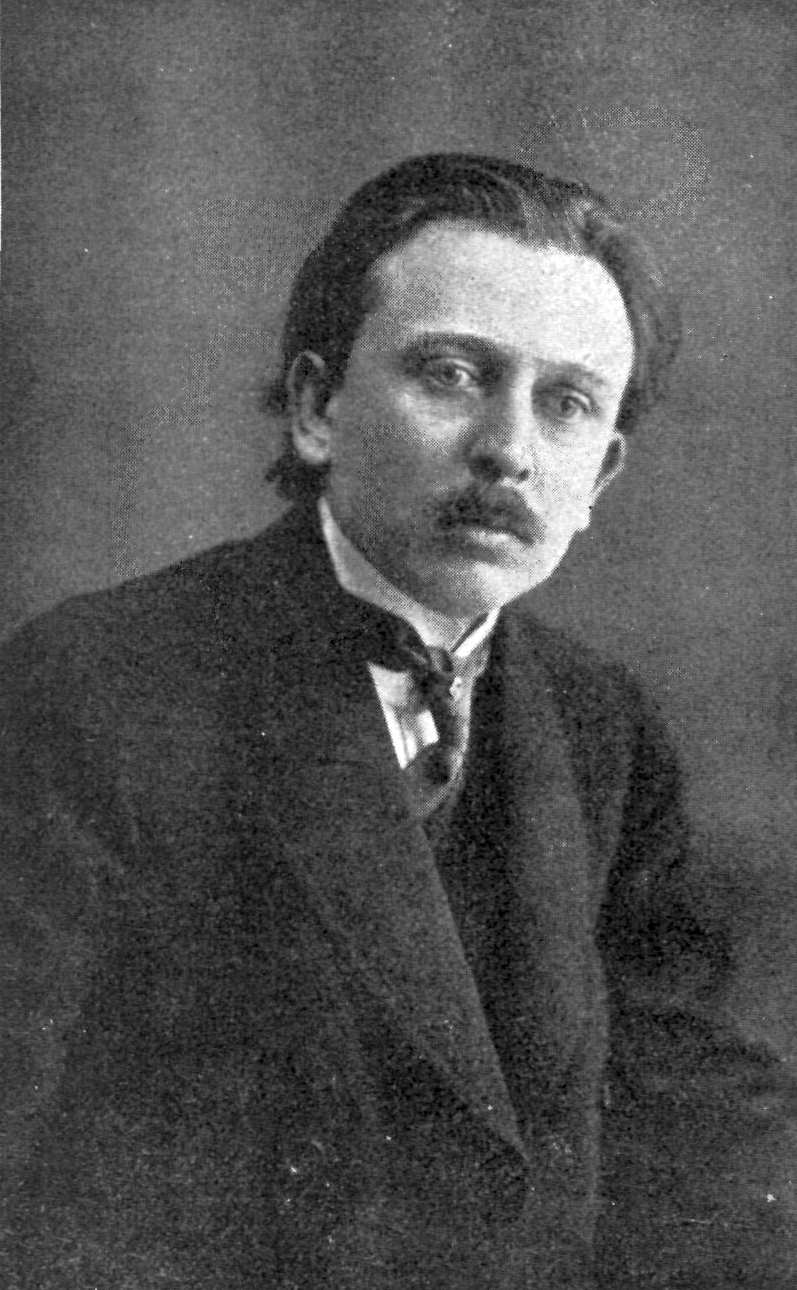
Octavian Goga c. 1911

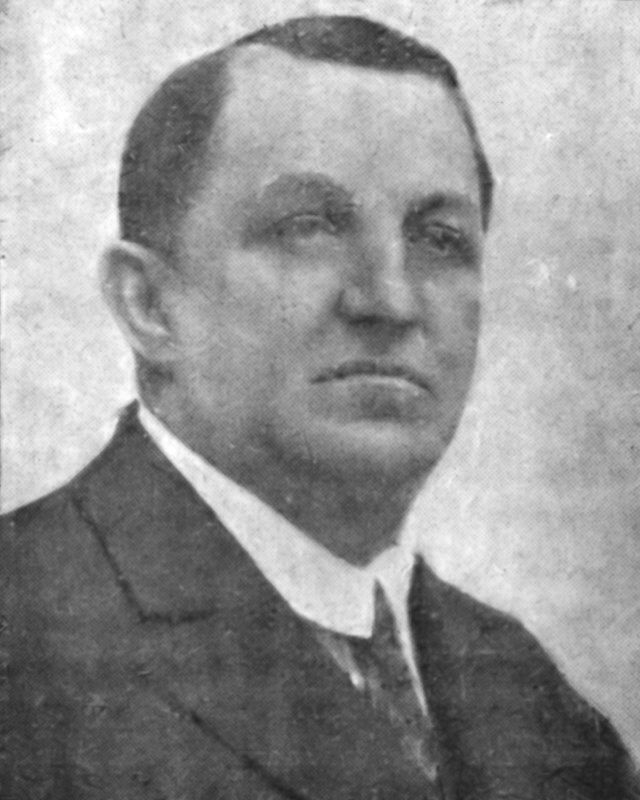
Avram Imbroane in 1933

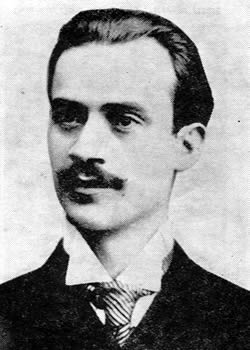
Octavian Codru Tăslăuanu c. 1900

== 1916 closure and 1918 revival ==
Just shortly after, following ratification of a treaty with the Entente, Romania declared war on the Central Powers. Epoca openly celebrated with a special edition, which claimed that Marghiloman had been heckled by enthusiastic Bucharesters. In the initial phases of the war, Romania made gains in Transylvania. Among the younger Epoca staff, Paul Costin volunteered for the front, and fought with distinction at Porumbacu, after which he withdrew with the Land Forces. Later in 1916, the neutralists and Germanophiles appeared vindicated, as southern Romania was invaded and occupied by the Central Powers. Filipescu died just shortly after, in October—personally affected by the loss of Turtucaia. His final Epoca article, reportedly comprising only "a few phrases", was dedicated to that battle; its publication was barred by military censorship. Junimists such as Carp, who remained in German-held territory, posthumously blamed him and his associates for the national crisis.

Filipescu's son Grigore received telegrams of condolences from Venizelos and Nikolaos Politis, who were then affiliated with the Greek government in Thessaloniki. Epoca suffered as a consequence of its political agenda: it closed down on 22 November 1916, just as Bucharest was being besieged. The Epoca staff traveled with the Land Forces into Western Moldavia, but the paper was not immediately revived there. By March 1918, Romania had sued for peace, and its administration was handled by Marghiloman's own Conservative-and-Germanophile cabinet. Pisani continued to own the Epoca trademark during the interval, but agreed to sell it to Grigore in September 1918. Though the two men disagreed with each other on points of policy, Pisani thought it natural that the newspaper be returned to its founders.

A new series finally came out at Iași on 18 September 1918. The country reentered the war in November 1918, shortly before the general armistice; this again reshuffled power in Romania, allowing the Ententists to return. Epoca, now partly handled by Eugen Titeanu (who also did its literary column, under the pen name of Stilet), moved back to Bucharest on 2 December 1918. Its new editors included Raul Crăciun, who had been a prisoner of the Odessa Soviet Republic before reaching Iași in February 1919. The staff made repeated efforts to recruit Pisani as a chief editor, but he declined—though he allowed his articles to be carried by his former daily. He is known to have briefly returned as administrative director in 1922, directly intervening in educating other staff writers and ensuring that their articles were up to standards.

By its own definition, Epoca was now a general-interest paper, though its content was primarily political and partisan. In January 1920, Chemarea's Ion Vinea took notice of its revival, shunning it as one of the "bourgeois journals" who complimented each other while trying to repress competition on the left. As Vinea observed, Filipescu and his nominal rivals as Viitorul and Îndreptarea used "a certain press", "that anodyne and stunted cuss", as a by-word for socialist papers. Epoca was financed from Filipescu's personal fortune; its content was subsequently reduced to only four pages, of which three were its patron's various political polemics—a format that no longer changed for the rest of the paper's existence. Additional support came from General Gheorghe Cantacuzino-Grănicerul, who is said to have spent whole days at the Epoca headquarters (shared with the Conservative Club), and from the aging politician Mihail "Mișu" Deșliu, who spent some of his own money on keeping the venture afloat. Filipescu was eventually faced with a likely bankruptcy. He and his political associate Argetoianu made special efforts to obtain more funds, and ended up accepting stipends from financiers Aristide Blank and Jean Chrissoveloni. Since they also provided the latter two with political support, Argetoianu and Filipescu were confirmed on the administrative board of Marmorosch Blank Bank; that institution effectively owned Epoca.

By 1922, the newspaper had been joined by a cartoonist, Ion Valentin Anestin, as well as by several young reporters, including Raul Anastasiu, Alexandru V. Cazimir, I. Șt. Ioachimescu, Titel Miciora, Mihail Munteanu, Mirel Ramiro Neculau, and Mircea Ștefănescu. They were later, and only temporarily, joined by I. Peltz, who recorded his admiration for the close friendship that existed between Anestin and Ștefănescu. The actor Constantin Barcaroiu also debuted here as a poet (with verse that represented the final echoes of Symbolism), and remained a regular in the early 1920s.

Epoca's revivalist team
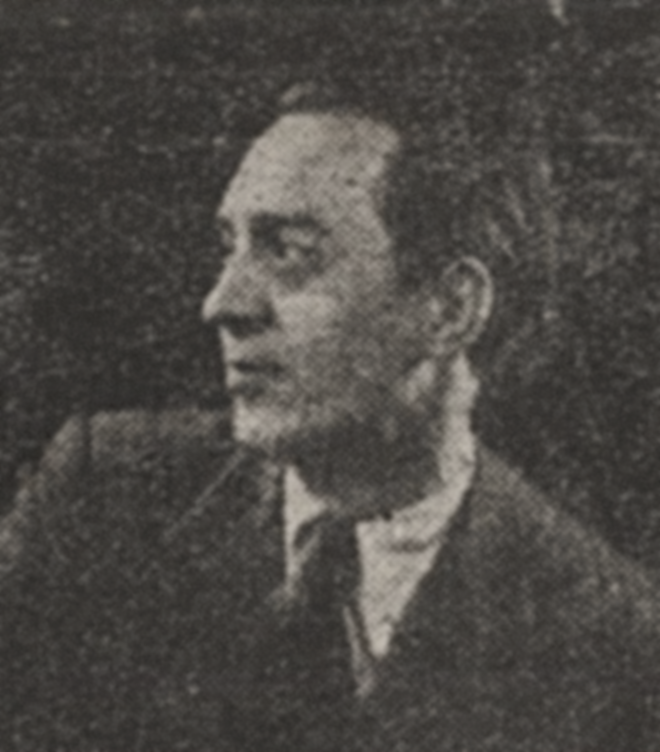
Ion Valentin Anestin in 1937

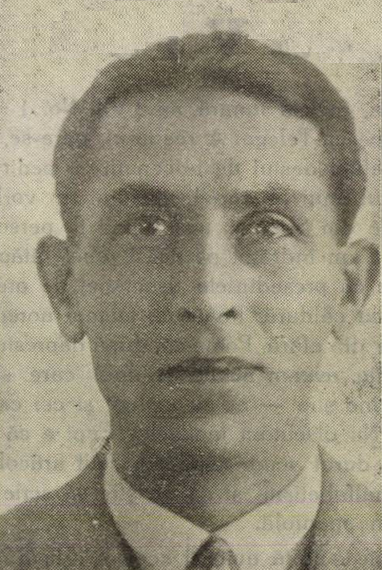
Constantin Barcaroiu in 1928

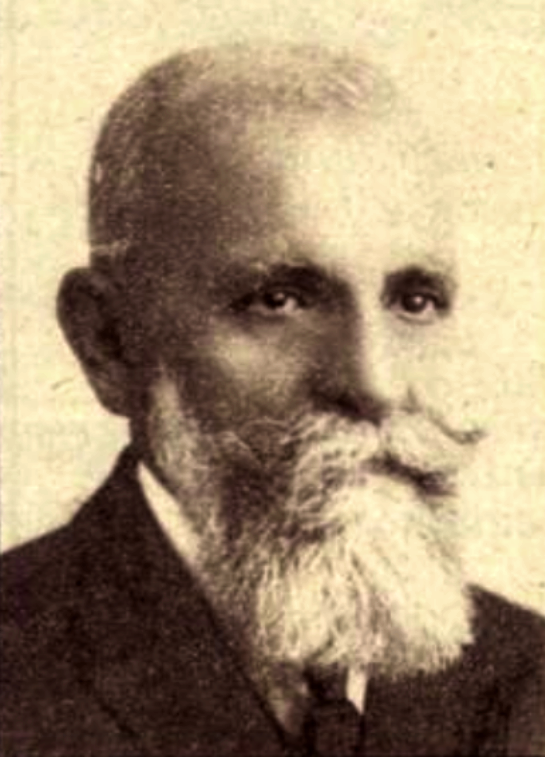
Gheorghe Cantacuzino-Grănicerul in 1931

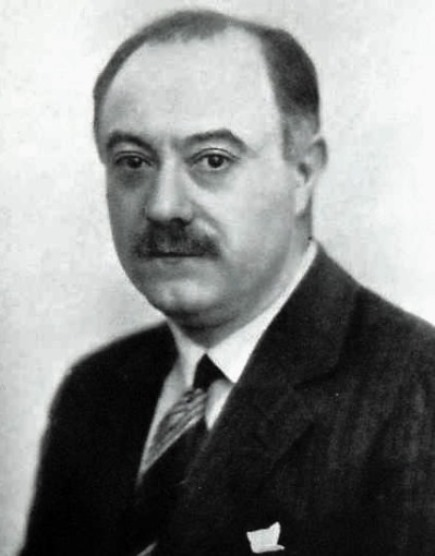
Grigore Filipescu in 1936

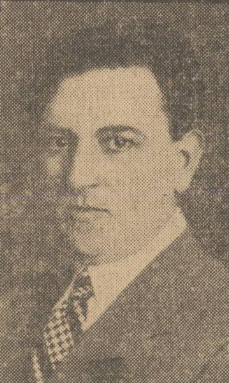
I. Peltz in 1934

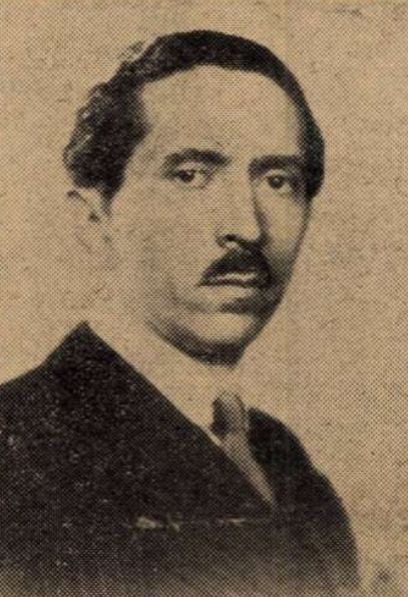
Eugen Titeanu c. 1938

== Carlism and Beza affair ==
Epoca was briefly supportive of the right-wing People's Party (and criticized by Iorga as the "evening edition" of the Populists' own Îndreptarea). However, it also clashed with that group in some instances, including in June 1920—when Zamfirescu, now a leading Populist, dueled Crăciun with pistols, over claims that he viewed as insulting. According to Zăstroiu, this edition of Epoca, which had Filipescu Jr as its publisher, was almost entirely nationalistic in the mainstream form, with only vague mentions of conservatism; this followed Filipescu's own passage through the revived PCD, and then to the Romanian National Party. In late 1921, as the Averescu cabinet signaled a hawkish stance regarding Soviet Russia, Epoca advised for de-escalation. This fact was noted by Vinea, who saw Filipescu as a "microscopic" voice within the larger pacifist consensus of the Romanian opposition.

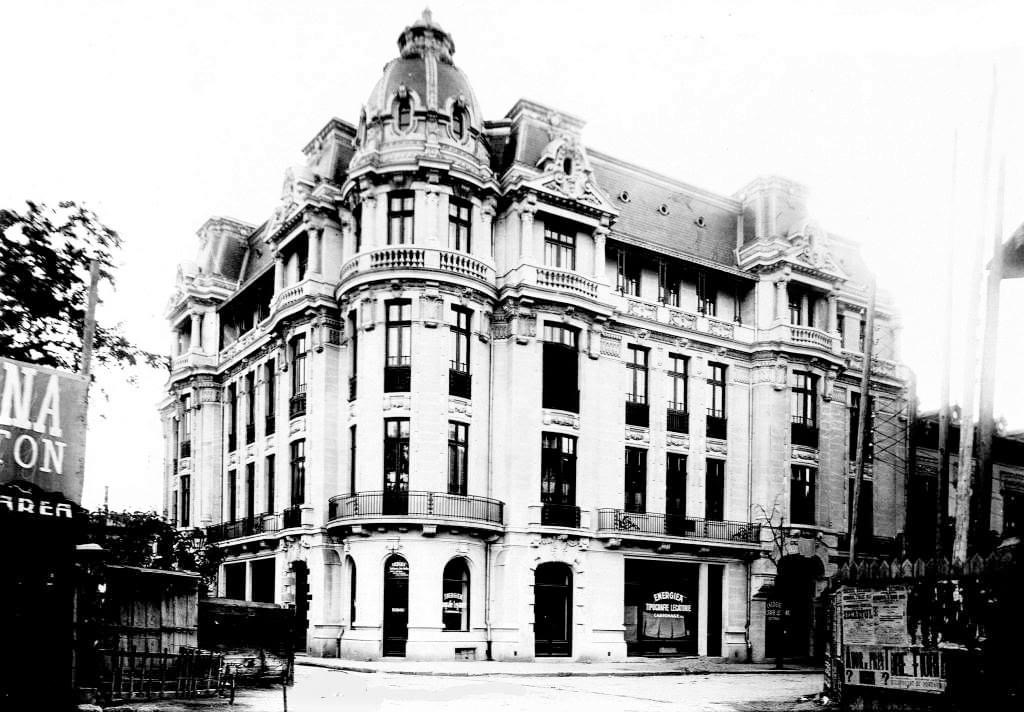
The former Astoria Hotel, which housed Epoca in 1926

The paper continued to be published in Bucharest to 19 August 1923. It had a hiatus that lasted until 2 February 1926. In his memoirs, journalist and publisher Pamfil Șeicaru observed that the newspaper owed all the popularity it still had to Filipescu's polemical articles, which were genuinely informed and well-written. Political and literary content was blended in Alexandru Kirițescu's column, Balta cu broaște ("Puddle of Frogs"). In 1926, he responded there to claims made by the French communist Henri Barbusse, who had criticized Romanian efforts during the previous war. Epoca was in print until 22 April 1926, when another Averescu cabinet ordered it shut down. The reason cited for this measure was that Filipescu had used the paper to ridicule Miron Cristea, the Orthodox Metropolitan of All Romania. The same issue riled up nationalist students organized as the "Christian League". On 18 April 1926, they devastated the paper's offices, which were then located on Calea Victoriei (on grounds owned by Astoria Hotel). Filipescu's tight association with Blank, who was Jewish, was drawing attention in antisemitic circles, where Epoca became known as a "kike" mouthpiece.

A final series came out on 5 February 1929, and resisted for almost nine years. Upon relaunching the paper, its editors announced their readiness to defend it from any future censorship, even at gunpoint. In this late avatar, Epoca was mostly a mouthpiece of Filipescu's new conservative party, originally known as the Vlad Țepeș League (LVȚ). Epoca's main focus was on undermining the regency regime and the Știrbey cabinet, to whom Filipescu opposed the exiled former crown prince, Carol Caraiman. The threats of violent responses to government censorship failed to materialize, as Epoca was frequently suspended, or had its circulation confiscated, after specific and crude attacks on Barbu Știrbey, Ion I. C. Brătianu, and the Dowager Queen Marie. The LVȚ was part of a caucus that eventually managed to obtain Caraiman's arrival on the throne, on 8 June 1930. The former exile deposed his own son Michael, and reigned as Carol II. The coup was immediately praised in Epoca by Radu Budișteanu, who declared that Carol would "put the house in order", "bring[ing] us peace and plenty."

Immediately after Carol's seizure of power, both the LVȚ and Epoca were joined by Gheorghe Beza, who came in from the antisemitic Iron Guard. His arrival there alienated Budișteanu, who claimed to have left the newspaper after being slapped by Beza, whom Filipescu still would not fire. Budișteanu also observed that Beza had turned Epoca into a "guttersnipes' club", and that, under his influence, the paper came very close to eulogizing the Iron Guard—a move that was only curbed through Filipescu's personal intervention. Beza took charge of the LVȚ's youth wing, Tineretul Țepist, and, as he himself acknowledged in 1936, maintained a close relationship with the Guardists. Just weeks after his arrival, Epoca was at the center of a national scandal, following Beza's attempt to shoot down a government official, Constantin Angelescu. Beza openly admitted his action, since he regarded Angelescu as a leading enemy of his own Aromanian community, though he indignantly rejected allegations (originating with Budișteanu) that he had also wanted to kill Constantin Stere. During the resulting inquiry, examining magistrates took testimonies from Filipescu and from Epoca's editor, I. Manu. In his more public response, Filipescu suggested reintroducing the death penalty and applying it to his disgraced employee. The proposal was dismissed as "extreme" by the left-wingers at Adevărul.

During the last days of 1930, Filipescu intercepted and published in Epoca a letter from the German Ambassador Gerhard von Mutius, in which the latter defended Știrbey while criticizing Carol. Filipescu demanded a duel, describing von Mutius as the tool of German revisionism. He himself had joined the new Carlist establishment, and, in this capacity, ensured that the monarch would marginalize Iuliu Maniu and his National Peasants' Party (PNȚ). As such, Epoca was for a while outstandingly critical of Maniu, though he and Filipescu later formed an alliance against Carol's camarilla.

== "Beacon of the reactionaries" ==
From 1931, Epoca was also involved in its owner's conflict with the right-wing politician Mihail Manoilescu, after exposing the latter's political corruption. Manoilescu sued the paper, but a grand jury ruled against in a final trial of 1937. In matters of international policy, Epoca was primarily focused on criticizing Fascist Italy, identified by Filipescu as a threat to global peace. As a result of his radicalism on this issue, he was unable to accept appointment as Foreign Minister in the PNȚ-and-Carlist cabinet. The paper was still ambivalent regarding Weimar Germany's potential transformation into an imperialist power, after news of its customs union with Austria. While Alexandrina Cantacuzino suggested that Romania could find benefits in that expansion, Cantacuzino-Grănicerul contrarily described it as a threat. In his view, Germany was co-operating with the Soviet Union against Romania; he therefore called on his fellow citizens to preserve Francophilia as a "vital interest".

Epoca was lenient toward the repentant Germanophile Dumitru Karnabatt, who was allowed to return as a literary contributor in 1930. Zăstroiu notes that Titeanu's one literary page was a throwback to Grigore Păucescu's neo-romanticism (being utterly indifferent towards modernism), while also making no effort to recruit contributors of a standing similar to Caragiale, Delavrancea, Iorga, and Lovinescu's. Only a few original poems appeared in the interwar Epoca, by authors such as Nicolae Davidescu and Alexandru Carussy; the relatively few sketch stories were usually penned by Gheorghe Brăescu, Paul Daniel, and Virgil Treboniu. Engaged in editorial work at Epoca, Grigore Ancu penned "pure poetry", in a years-long collaboration with Treboniu. The interwar Epoca hosted some of the first-ever articles penned by Nicolae Crevedia and Eugène Ionesco, as well as the earliest installments from Constantin Gane's celebrated work of women's history, Trecute vieți de doamne și domnițe. Some other regulars of the art and literary page included Kirițescu, Dimitrie Cuclin, Theodor Rășcanu, Aida Vrioni, N. Constantinescu-Nicon, George Iancu Ghidu, I. M. Negreanu, Alexandru Nichita, Dinu Rocco, Dan Smântânescu, Vladimir Tudor, and Erast Vicol. Epoca was at the time much focused on theater, with sometimes scathing reviews that challenged plays (including those by contributors past and present, from Iorga to Kirițescu), and performances (such as Marioara Ventura's). A special series of cultural-themed articles stood in defense of linguistic purism, with Iuliu Scriban as a contributor (and Pisani as an ideological inspiration).

After the full shock of the Great Depression, Filipescu and his staffers engaged began virulently opposing debt relief, as enacted by the Iorga cabinet; former ally Argetoianu, who was at the Finance Ministry, once noted that Epoca's attacks on him amounted to "Gypsy swearwords". Iorga went from being Filipescu's personal friend to a regular target of his jibes, hosted by Epoca throughout the mid-1930s. In Epoca, Filipescu also began hinting that Carol was losing his supporters, and that his seemingly chaotic interventions in politics risked pushing Romanians into adopting republicanism. Commenting on this scenario, leftist author Jean-Germain Tricot expressed a hope that the LVȚ chairman, whom he labeled "a beacon of the reactionaries", was being prophetic. In mid-1934, as the arms industry and the PNȚ were shaken by a corruption scandal known as the "Škoda Affair", the LVȚ's Costin Sturdza insinuated in Epoca that the scandal had deeper roots, of the kind that could only be discussed once government will have lifted censorship. The hint was picked up by Universul, which urged the parliamentary commission to subpoena Sturdza and let him testify about these issues. In 1935, Filipescu himself was driving the effort to suspend all forms of government censorship in the Romanian press.

Epoca was still opposed to far-left groups. It celebrated that the already outlawed Romanian Communist Party was being targeted by police in early 1936, and supported the communists' mass prosecution at Craiova. Suggesting that most defendants were non-Romanians, it depicted anti-fascism as a front for Soviet interference. Filipescu himself nuanced such claims by proposing a rapprochement between France, Italy, the Little Entente, the Balkan Entente, and the Soviet Union, with a mutual assistance pact to be signed between the Soviets and Romania. The LVȚ leader was also emerging as a critic of Nazi Germany and of its appeasement by Romania's Western allies. The newspaper hosted his article on these issues, which enjoyed some international exposure after being translated for L'Ouest-Éclair (March 1935).

Final arrivals
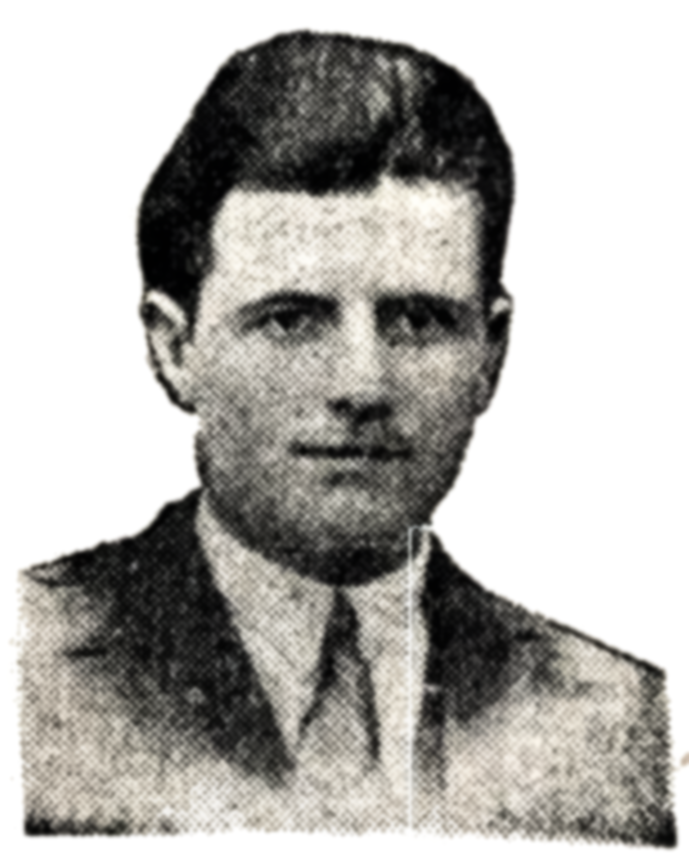
Gheorghe Beza in 1936

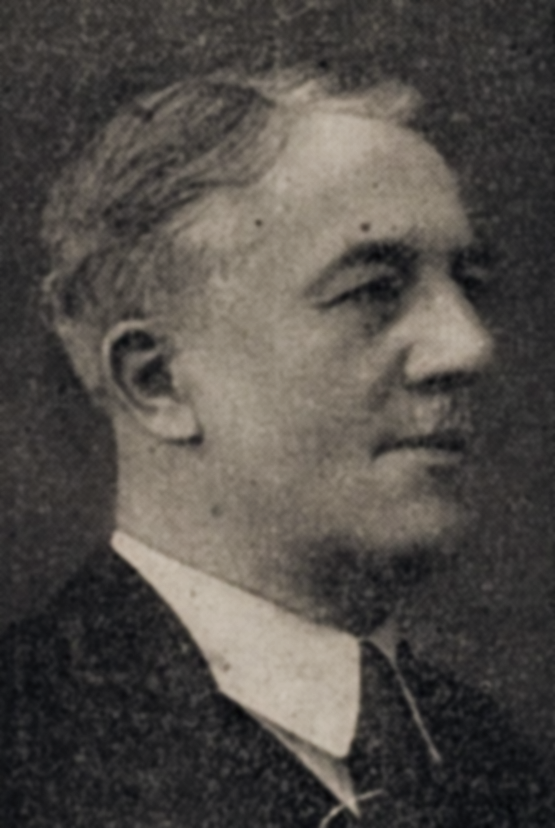
Gheorghe Brăescu in 1926

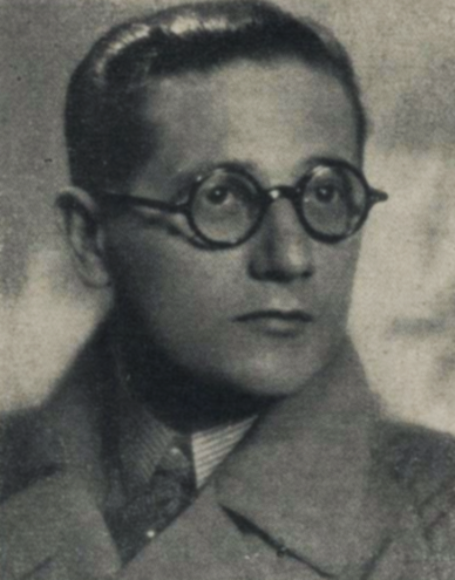
Nicolae Crevedia in 1938

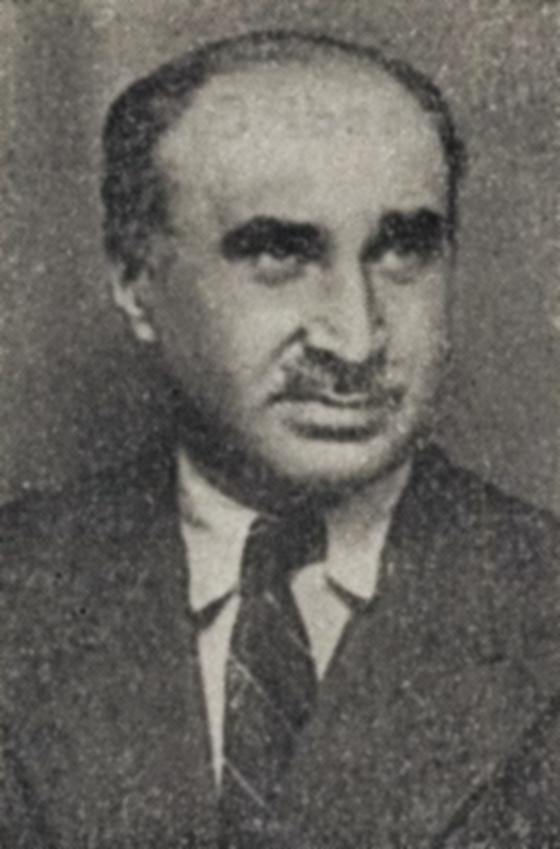
Dimitrie Cuclin c. 1930

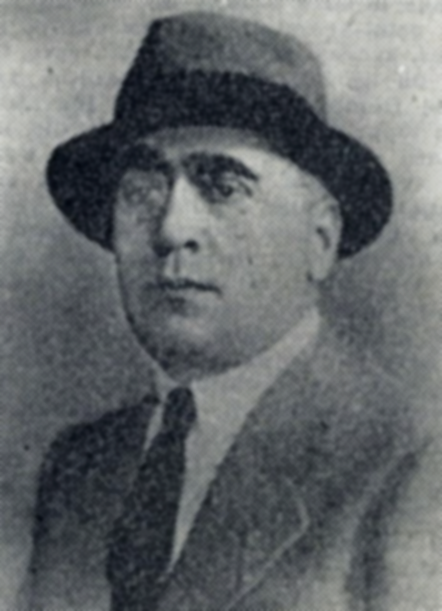
Constantin Gane c. 1930

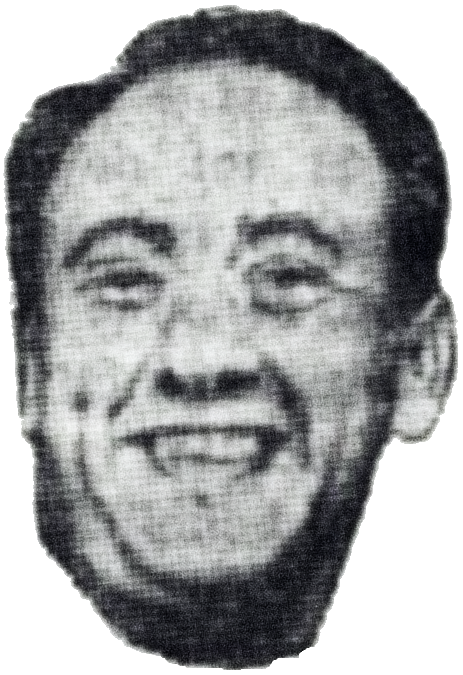
Eugène Ionesco in 1938

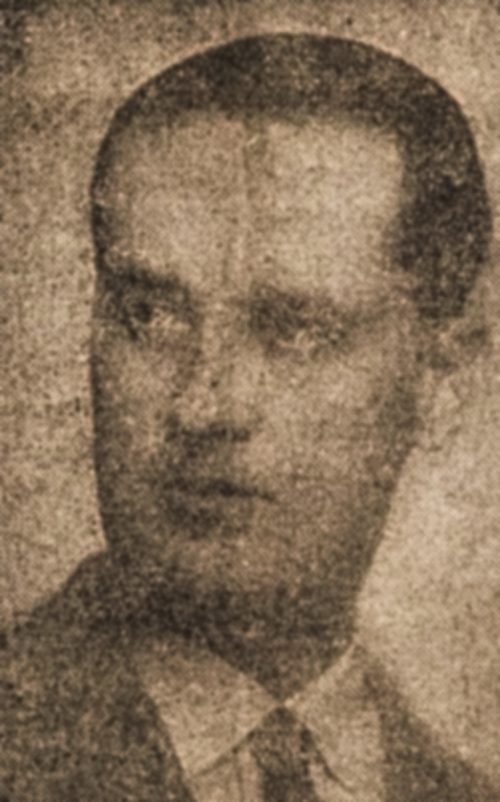
Alexandru Kirițescu c. 1930

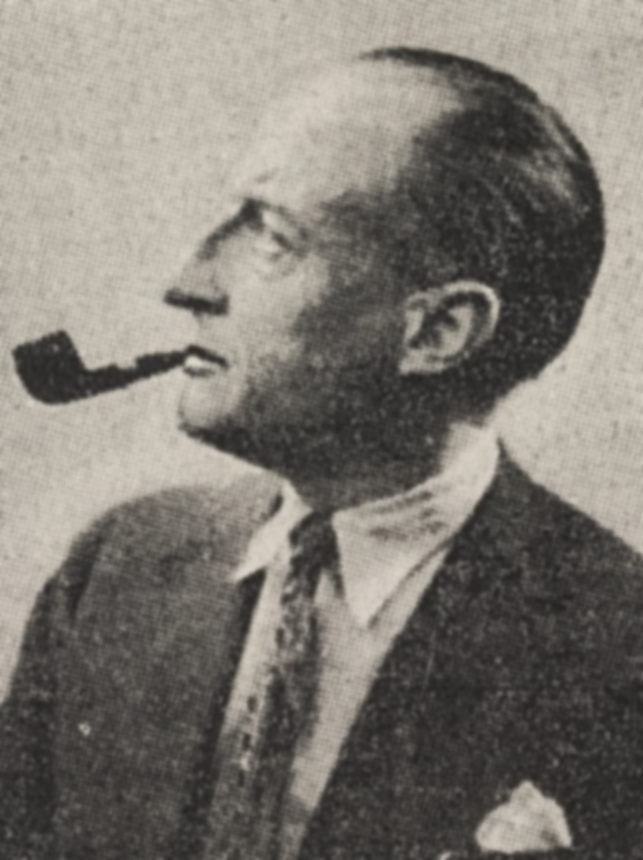
Theodor Rășcanu in 1935

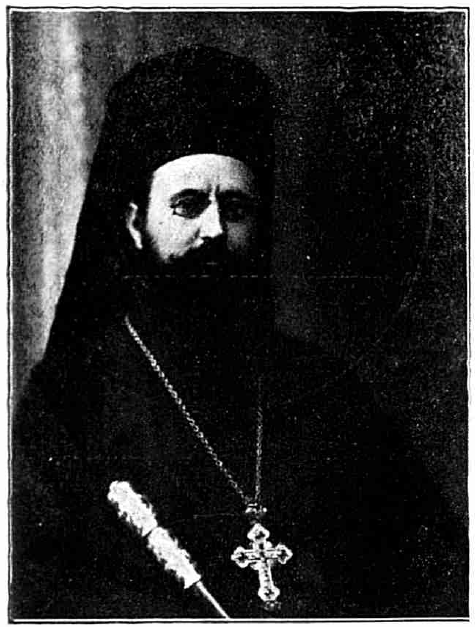
Iuliu Scriban in 1910

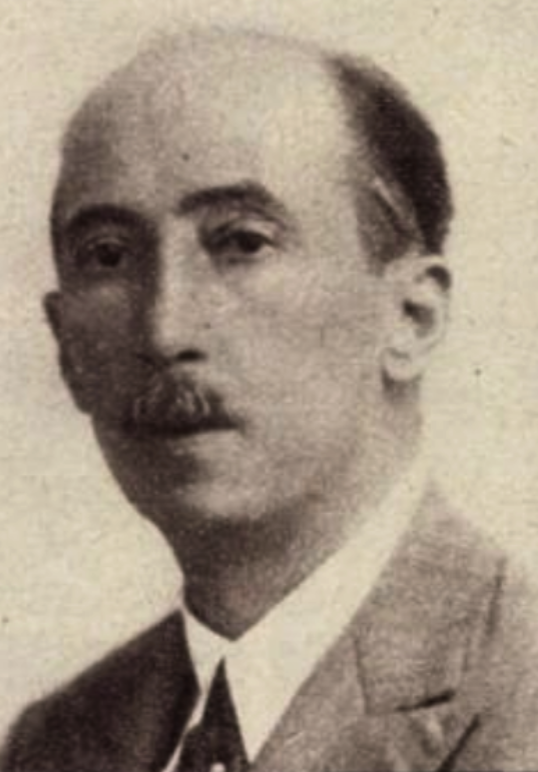
Costin Sturdza in 1931

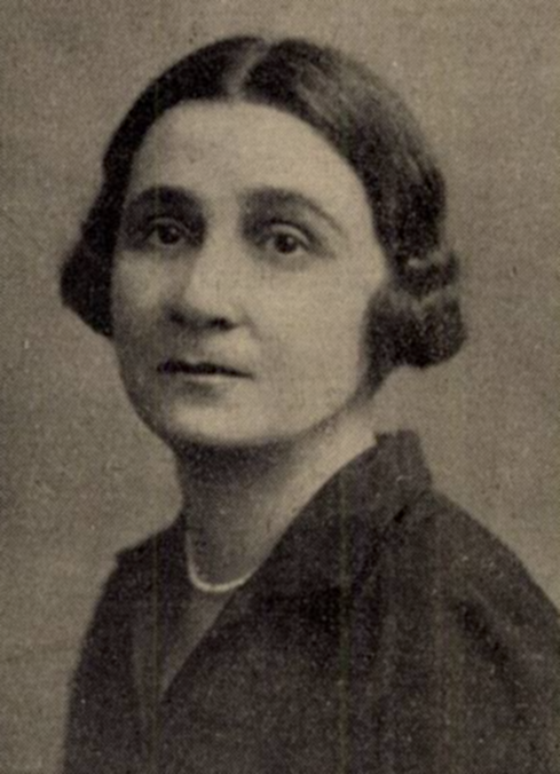
Aida Vrioni in 1928

== Final years ==
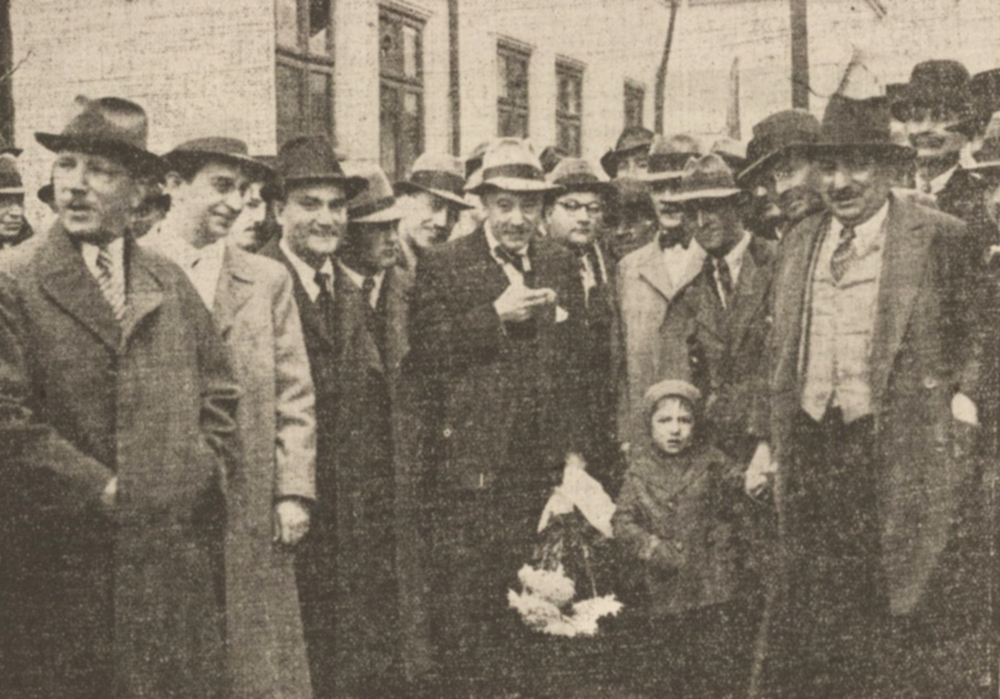
Grigore Filipescu (holding bouquet) with fellow members of the Conservative Party (as the Vlad Țepeș League had rebranded itself) in October 1937

Filipescu was especially outspoken in his opposition to the Iron Guard and the National Christian Party, identifying them as sources of violence and sedition. With a June 1936 piece in Epoca, he blamed the PNL-appointed Tătărăscu cabinet, and in particular its Interior Minister, Ion Inculeț, for having coddled antisemitic groups. As he put it: "It seems we shall have to pay dearly for the demands of Mr Inculeț's domestic policy." Filipescu saw himself as compatible with the Iron Guard's moderate, breakaway faction, called Crusade of Romanianism—which had recruited Beza, now a public critic of the Guard, in January of that year.

In July 1936, when an Iron Guard death squad had murdered Crusade leader Mihai Stelescu, Epoca featured its owner's mournful thoughts. In that piece, Filipescu depicted Stelescu as a "romantic misfit", and suggested that Crusader ideology was based on Constantin Rădulescu-Motru's moderate nationalism. Disappointed by the invasion of Ethiopia, Filipescu was again positioned against the Italian regime. According to July 1936 claims in the Italian press, "a numerous group of [LVȚ] members" was rejecting the chief's take on international politics, and made its feelings known in a publicized protest. Filipescu viewed himself as proven right during November 1936, when Italy stated its embrace of Hungarian irredentism, directly offending Romanian interests.

The post-1918 owners continued to regard Epoca as directly linked to the 1885 paper, and celebrated 1935 as its golden jubilee—while honoring the elderly Pisani as a founding figure. In addition to functioning as the LVȚ's publication, Epoca was branching out into coverage of social and political tensions, from a conservative viewpoint. Also in 1935, the feuilleton was revived for Rășcanu's roman à clef, Promoția '907. Abundant in jibes at writers and journalists of other political persuasions (including Vinea and Peltz), it had to cease publication when some of its targets issued demands and threats.

As observed by leftist Ion Pas, in early 1936 Epoca was airing Scriban's ideas "on all issues, whatever they may pertain to". In that context, Pas was responding to his adversary's negative review of a conference on abortion, suggesting that Scriban had failed to understand the topic, and had been morally outraged by its simple coverage. In August, the newspaper unwittingly stepped into a historiographic and military controversy by publishing Andrei Popovici's recollections from the 1917 Battle of Mărășești. Marshal Prezan was infuriated that these notes eulogized General Constantin Cristescu, whom Prezan had removed from his command post due to his incompetence, and also that they made false claims as to the behavior of Russian revolutionary troops. A parallel dispute, opposing Epoca's Emanoil Hagi-Moscu to the PNL's Gherman Pântea, focused on allegations that the latter had been disloyal to Romania before and after the October Revolution. Pântea decided to sue Hagi-Moscu for libel, but the matter was fully dropped in November 1939, when he repeatedly failed to make his case in front of several courts.

According to journalist Louis Tissot, by October 1936 Filipescu had only managed to stoke censorship against his newspaper and his own writings therein, since theirs was a "too Francophile" outlook. Approaching the end of its run, Epoca had a relatively small readership in 1936, with 15,000 copies per issue. This was half of what Viitorul was putting out; the general-interest Universul had 150 thousand copies per issue. Filipescu's party was finally banned under Carol's new authoritarian constitution, in February 1938. Filipescu reluctantly accepted this outcome, and, citing financial hurdles imposed through a new batch of new censorship laws, suspended Epoca on 8 May 1938. He still announced that bimonthly editions were being prepared. Though researcher Andrei Popescu could not locate any additional issues in his 2012 overview, Zăstroiu notes the paper's formal closure as being 15 July. At the time, Filipescu's had become terminally ill. Upon his death in August, since he had no active heirs, any ownership transfers could not be clarified in time—meaning that Epoca was no longer revived in later years. The trademark and copyright went to his mother, Maria Blaremberg-Filipescu, and his widow, Ioana Cantacuzino-Filipescu.
