= Viitorul =

Defunct Romanian daily newspaper

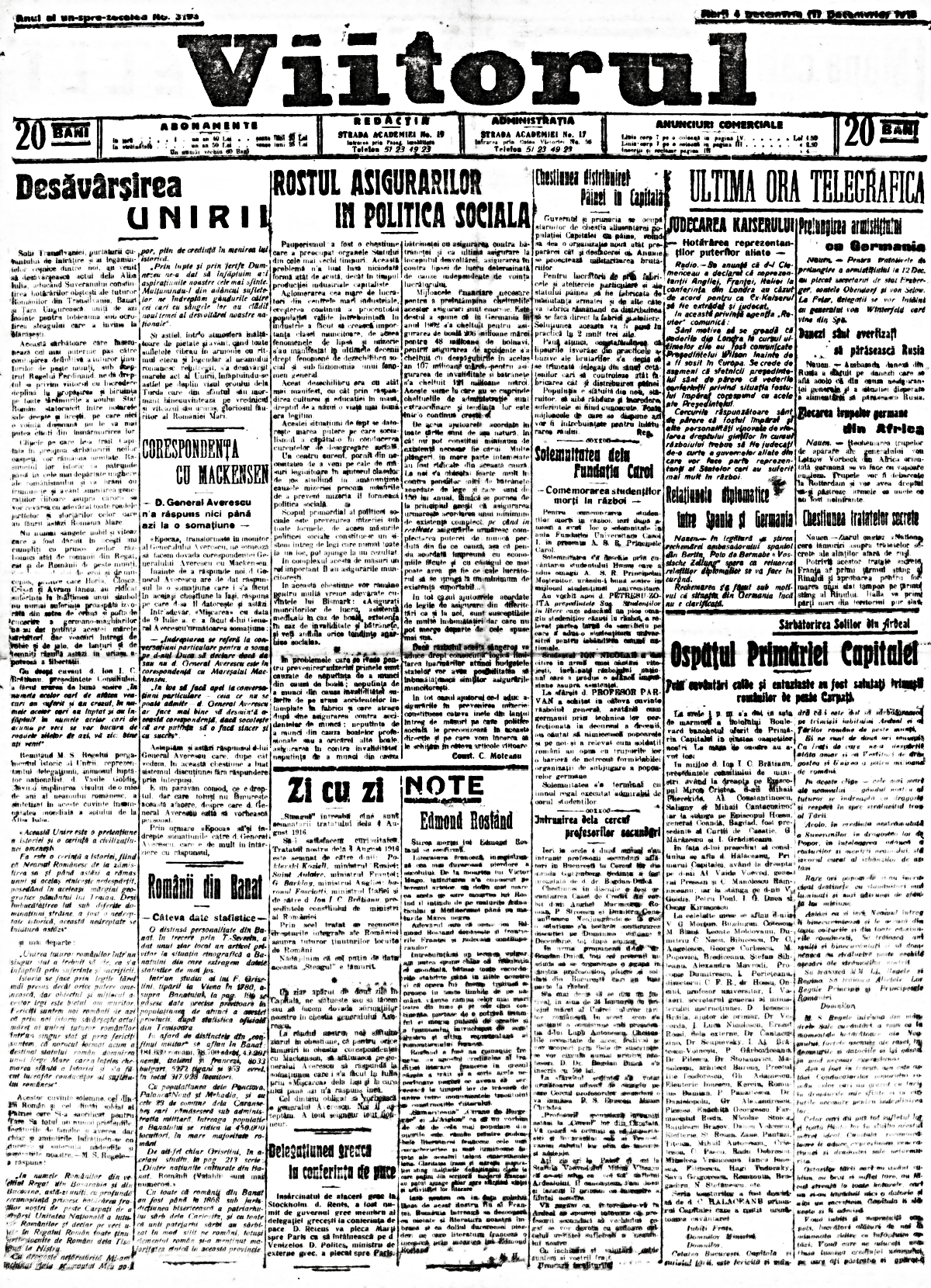
- Front page on 4 December 1918, covering the union of Transylvania with Romania
- Type: Daily newspaper
- Format: Broadsheet
- Owner: National Liberal Party
- Founder(s): Constantin Alimănișteanu; Constantin Banu; Ion G. Duca
- Founded: 18 November 1907; 118 years ago
- Ceased publication: 18 February 1946; 80 years ago
- Political alignment: Center-left (to 1919); Right-wing (1919–1946); National liberalism (Romanian); Reformism; Romanian nationalism; Poporanism (to 1916)
- Language: Romanian
- Headquarters: Academiei Street 17, Bucharest
- City: Bucharest
- Country: Kingdom of Romania
- Circulation: 26,000 (as of 1934)

Viitorul ("The Future") was a daily newspaper published in the Kingdom of Romania, out of Bucharest, as a central organ of the National Liberal Party (PNL). It was formed just months after peasants' revolt of March 1907, being originally linked to the more left-wing, social-minded, factions within Romanian liberalism. Its reformism openly challenged the Conservative Party; its embrace of Romanian nationalism and its promise to enact an extensive land reform made it an ally of the Poporanists, some of whom became Viitorul contributors. The journal championed the cause of unity between Romanians across political borders, being particularly interested in those of Transylvania and Austria-Hungary at large. Though its editorial staff included Jews such as Henric Streitman, the newspaper's first edition (1907–1916) often vented the antisemitic feelings of its political contributors. In cultural terms, it championed modernism, welcoming in a group of Symbolists and avant-garde writers.

While the PNL itself appeared hesitant during the early stages of World War I, Viitorul was generally supportive of the Entente Powers. Its editorial line had to be toned down by Prime Minister Ion I. C. Brătianu; the Central Powers also attempted to buy influence in the country, including by paying off some of Viitorul's journalists. The newspaper was celebratory when Romania joined the Entente in August 1916, supporting the subsequent Romanian expedition in Transylvania. This effort proved abortive, and the newspaper went down once Romania itself was overran by the Central Powers. It reemerged in November 1918, after the Entente had regained regional control, and thereafter campaigned for Romania's recognition as a co-belligerent—and for the prosecution of Romanians who had collaborated with the German Empire. The subsequent two years brought the unification with Transylvania and the consolidation of Greater Romania; though Viitorul saluted this victory of the nationalist cause, it also came to resent the emergence of regional and regionalist challenges to the PNL's monopoly on power.

During the interwar, which saw the adoption of universal male suffrage and the realization of land reform, Viitorul abandoned its leftist credentials, rallying to a more right-wing platform drafted by Vintilă Brătianu. In this new incarnation, it backed economic nationalism and hard-line anti-communism, but moderated its antisemitism to where it favored Jewish emancipation (also embarking on an extensive polemic with far-right antisemitic agitators). It reacted with alarm when the National Peasants' Party, which in 1928 became the PNL's main competitor, expressed discreet support for the deposed Crown Prince Carol, but ultimately accepted Carol's return as King of Romania. The Carlist monarchy also cooperated with the Viitorul team, making one of the newspaper's founders, Ion G. Duca, the country's prime minister in 1933. By then, the PNL was also being dragged into a conflict with the fascist Iron Guard—resulting in Duca's assassination just weeks into his office. During the next four years, Viitorul was disputed between two PNL factions: one led by Dinu Brătianu, the other by Gheorghe Tătărescu.

The newspaper approved of Carol's repression of the Iron Guard, but was reluctant about embracing the increasingly authoritarian tenets of Carlism. Though the constitution of 1938 formally banned the PNL, both it and Viitorul continued to function; the Brătianu faction managed to obtain full control of the paper in April of that year, but it and all other PNL assets were confiscated by the National Renaissance Front in December. Viitorul was only reestablished in September 1944, days after a successful anti-fascist coup, which saw the PNL returning into legality. Edited by Mihail Fărcășanu, it was increasingly confrontational toward the Romanian Communist Party, which, in the late 1940s, was steadily encroaching on multiparty democracy. The communists sabotaged its printing; it was banned by the Allied Commission in February 1945, after putting out a mysterious message which seemed to be encoded. Briefly relaunched in January 1946, it only survived to February. Pursued by the authorities, Fărcășanu escaped the country later in 1946, months before the proclamation of a communized republic.

== First decade ==
=== Reformist-modernist beginnings ===
The paper was established on 18 November 1907, and published its first series to 21 November 1916 (initially as a "morning paper", down to 1910). Journalist Constantin Poenaru observes that the name was indicative of PNL organs, with many Viitorul papers published in provincial towns "long before the official paper of Bucharest." As later acknowledged by its last editor-in-chief, Fărcășanu, it owed its existence to both the embarrassment caused by the major peasants' revolt of March and to the PNL's sweep in the general elections of June. It therefore considered itself a "fresh new daily", centered on popularizing the party's reformist agenda, taken up in print by one of the kingdom's younger politicians, Ion G. Duca. Literary historian Al. Raicu suggests that it was overall a voice from the "left-liberal faction" of the PNL.

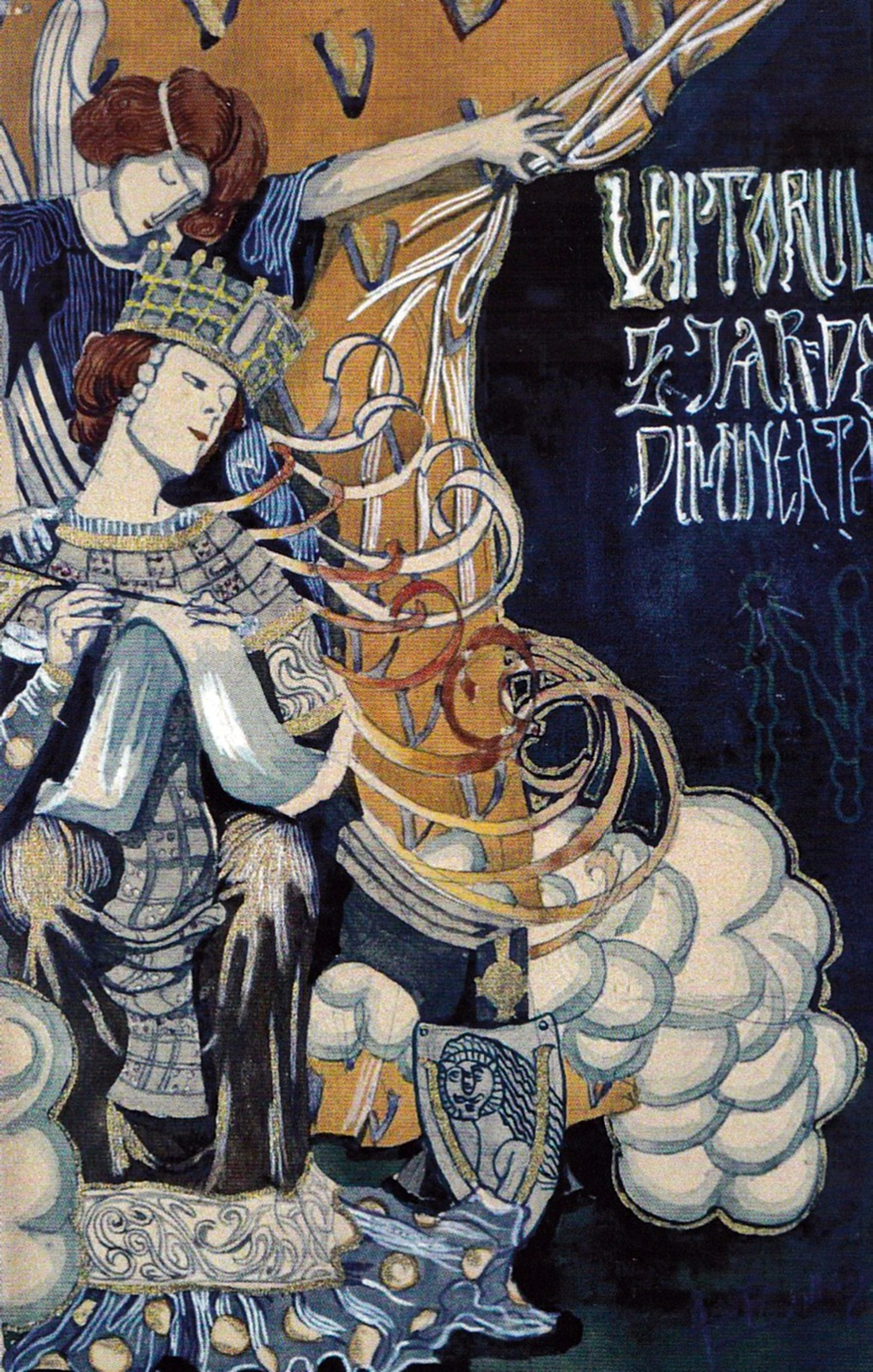
Project for a Viitorul advertisement, by Apcar Baltazar (died 1909)

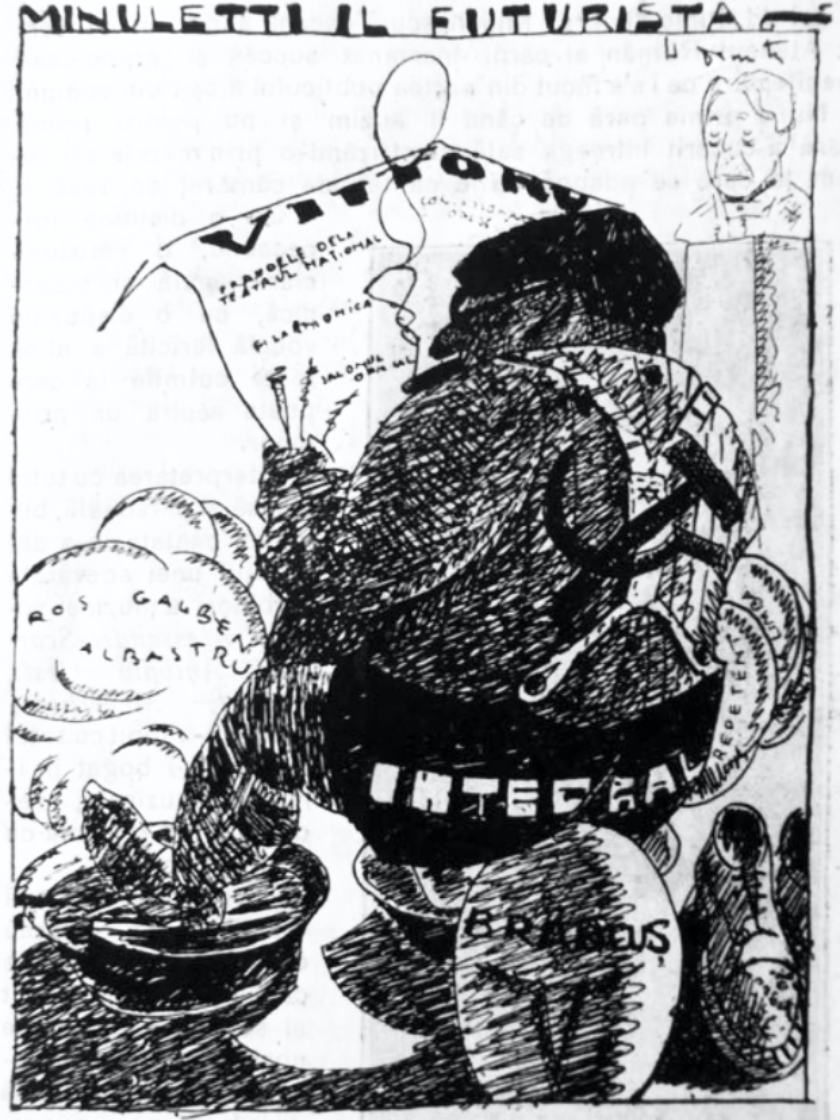
1925 cartoon by Horațiu Dimitriu, mocking Ion Minulescu as a promoter of unpalatable causes, including Futurism, and showing him reading from Viitorul

Viitorul's founding directors, other than Duca, were Constantin Alimănișteanu and Constantin Banu; editors included Ion Minulescu, Virgil Caraivan, Alexandru Anestin and Nicolae Baboianu, with Iosif Iser as the staff cartoonist and portraitist. Though a political sheet defending the PNL's take on public affairs (mainly through regular contributions by Banu and Duca), this first edition of Viitorul was also marginally significant in Romanian literature, hosting poetry by Minulescu, Dumitru Constantinescu-Teleormăneanu, Mihail Cruceanu, Dimitrie Drăghicescu, Ion Foti, Cincinat Pavelescu, I. U. Soricu, Claudia Millian, Dimitrie Anghel and Ștefan Octavian Iosif (the latter two under the shared signature of "A. Mirea"). A rural schoolteacher, Vasile Demetrius, debuted here with verse, but then switched to prose fragments, since these paid better. A supply of artistic prose was handled by various talents, including N. Pora, with Caraivan, Drăghicescu, Petre Locusteanu and Vasile Savel providing either theoretical essays or literary chronicles.

From its first issues, Viitorul covered the cultural and social innovations of the period. On 9 December 1909, it featured the first journalistic reference to football in Romania, though the attached image showed a rugby football match. Through Caraivan, it backed efforts for unionization in the writers' profession, which ultimately resulted in the establishment of a Romanian Writers' Society. Minulescu bridged his duties as editorial secretary with his intense promotion of the Symbolist movement. His articles in the paper featured celebrations of Futurism, with ample notes on the poetry of Filippo Tommaso Marinetti, as well as introductions to earlier works by Arthur Rimbaud and Lautréamont. As argued by the literary scholar Paul Cernat, the Viitorul offices were for a while home to the more modernist side of the Symbolist counterculture, which was already influenced not just by Rimbaud and the Futurists, but also by Walt Whitman and Maxim Gorky.

Duca and Banu made repeated efforts to recruit the novelist Gala Galaction as a permanent collaborator, though he only ever allowed them to publish one of his short stories, "Soleima". From early 1912, the staff was joined by actor Alexandru Mavrodi (or "Alex Fronda"), who was at once a theatrical columnist, political chronicler, and regional correspondent for Western Moldavia; in parallel, he and Carol Steinberg ran one of Romania's first avant-garde publications, Fronda. According to the playwright and memoirist Victor Eftimiu, he was excellent as a manager, and came to run the newspaper even as Banu was still credited as a main editor. The post-Symbolist Tudor Arghezi was also briefly affiliated with Viitorul, but left after a conflict with Banu. In his later articles, he argued that Banu had chosen to surround himself with intriguers and petty figures. According to Arghezi's accounts, Banu's nepotism resulted in Soricu's sacking, at a time when the latter was also paying for the upkeep of his impoverished mother.

=== Nationalism on the left ===
In the political landscape of the 1900s and 1910s, Viitorul channeled support for Romanian nationalism, at a time when many Romanians, as subjects of Austria-Hungary (primarily in Transylvania and the Duchy of Bukovina) and the Russian Empire (Bessarabia Governorate), had been left outside the Romanian state. In January 1908, its Transylvanian reporter interviewed Emil Babeș, who wanted Romanians to live as subjects of the Hungarian Crown rather than seek a more complete political emancipation. In its coverage of this project, Viitorul concluded that Babeș had "no political significance". By mid-1909, however, the newspaper was expressing admiration for Archduke Franz Ferdinand, the Austro-Hungarian heir presumptive, since he had approached his Romanian subjects' demands with "a sense of justice and a kind heart." After renewed agitation in favor of Romanian causes, it was banned at the border by the Hungarian authorities in November 1909. The issue was covered with derision in the more right-wing journal, Neamul Românesc, which argued that the Hungarian government had little reason to ban a cosmopolitan paper of "anonymous Symbolists", whose editorial team included the Romanian Jewish intellectual Henric Streitman and "his coreligionists". Some three months later, Viitorul publicized Simion Mândrescu and Moise Grozea's new political club, which aimed to coagulate the various nationalist groups into a structured movement.

The paper also defended the "generous ones"—a group of reformists who had defected from the Social Democratic Workers' Party to work within the PNL. Its polemical stances and left-wing critique of Marxism were showcased through open letters by Constantin Stere and Garabet Ibrăileanu, both of whom advocated for the PNL. In that context, Viitorul acted as a venue for strands of left-wing nationalism. One such voice was that of George Diamandy, another defector from Marxism, who in January 1910 aired his claim that virtually all Romanian Jews were unpatriotic. Embracing antisemitic tropes, Diamandy claimed that Jews had relished in the peasants' revolt; the Jewish paper, Revista Israelită, responded by reminding Diamandy that Jewish contributors to Romanian culture, such as Lazăr Șăineanu and Heimann Hariton Tiktin, had been chased out of public forums despite their loyalism to the state. On 1 March 1911, Viitorul alleged that Bessarabian Jews, forced out of their homes by Russian antisemitism, were effectively colonizing the Romanian-owned portions of Moldavia. This claim was dismissed as a canard by both the then-governing Conservative Party and the Union of Native Jews. Viitorul still had Streitman as its editor in chief, though he left in December 1912 to issue his own apolitical magazine, Realitatea.

In February 1910, Duca published in Viitorul an article defending a ban on unionization for employees of the state. His claims were censured by the socialists at România Muncitoare, who argued that the PNL had managed to "tear down the mask of its made-up democratism", calling Duca out as an "illustrious demagogue". Viitorul also had a running conflict with the more radically leftist Facla, which had published criticism of the Romanian Orthodox Church. Though penned by Arghezi (a Christian and a former monk), the Facla articles were depicted by Viitorul as Jewish propaganda—a claim that was later reproduced in Neamul Românesc. Arghezi replied in writing, exposing their claims as manipulative, and ridiculing Viitorul's unsigned staff polemicist, whom he believed to be the administrative director Sache Petreanu, as a "parasite". In his replies, Arghezi noted that the nationalist camp was keeping silent about uncomfortable facts not serving its own narrative—including Petreanu's own Jewishness. Banu's nationalism was complimented by his traditional tastes in art, clashing with Minulescu's own status as a herald of Romanian Symbolism. In 1912, Minulescu stated his independence by establishing his own literary review, Insula. The move was welcomed by Arghezi, who nevertheless noted as a paradox that Insula was being put out in opposition not just to Viitorul, but also to Banu's own cultural magazine, Flacăra. The polemic over church and art affairs was meanwhile being carried out more directly, between Arghezi and Banu, with occasional interventions from Locusteanu.

Viitorul founding figures
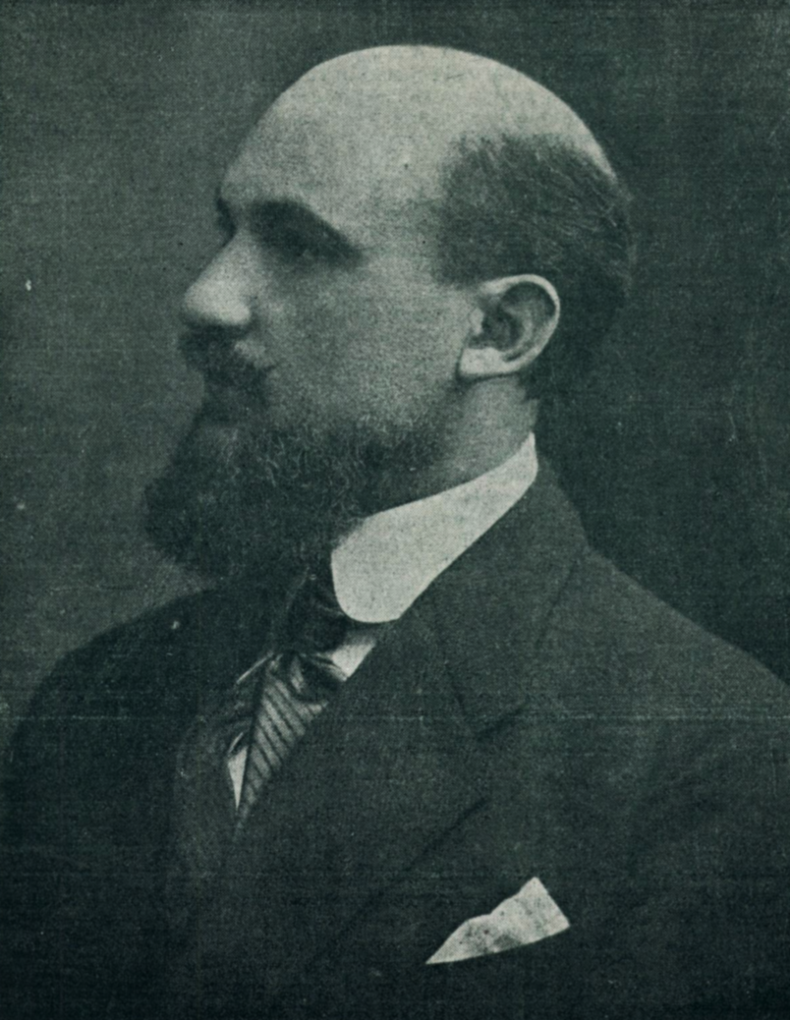
Constantin Banu

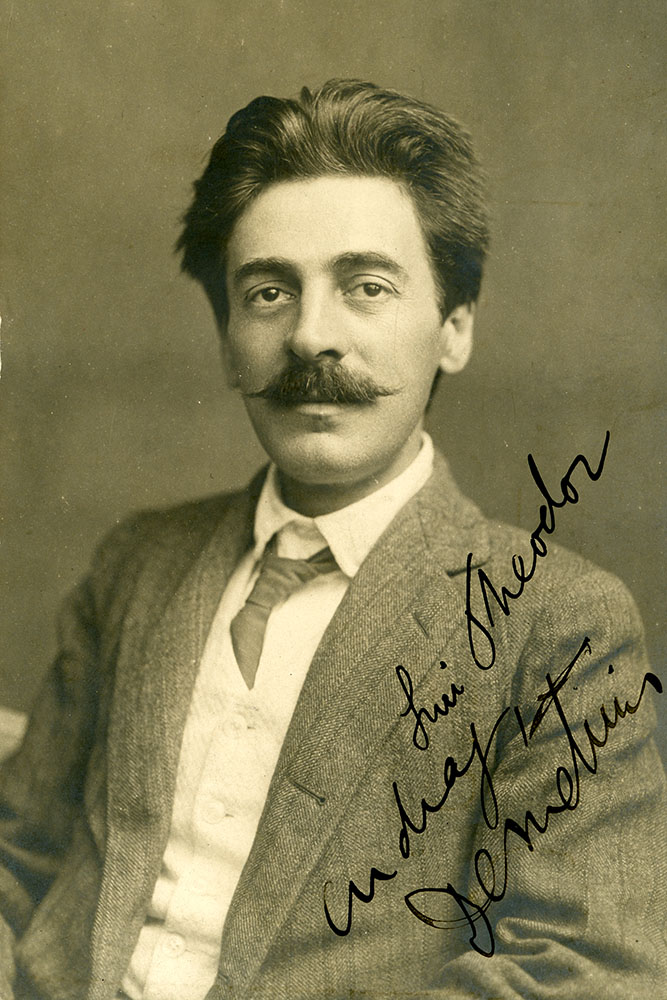
Vasile Demetrius

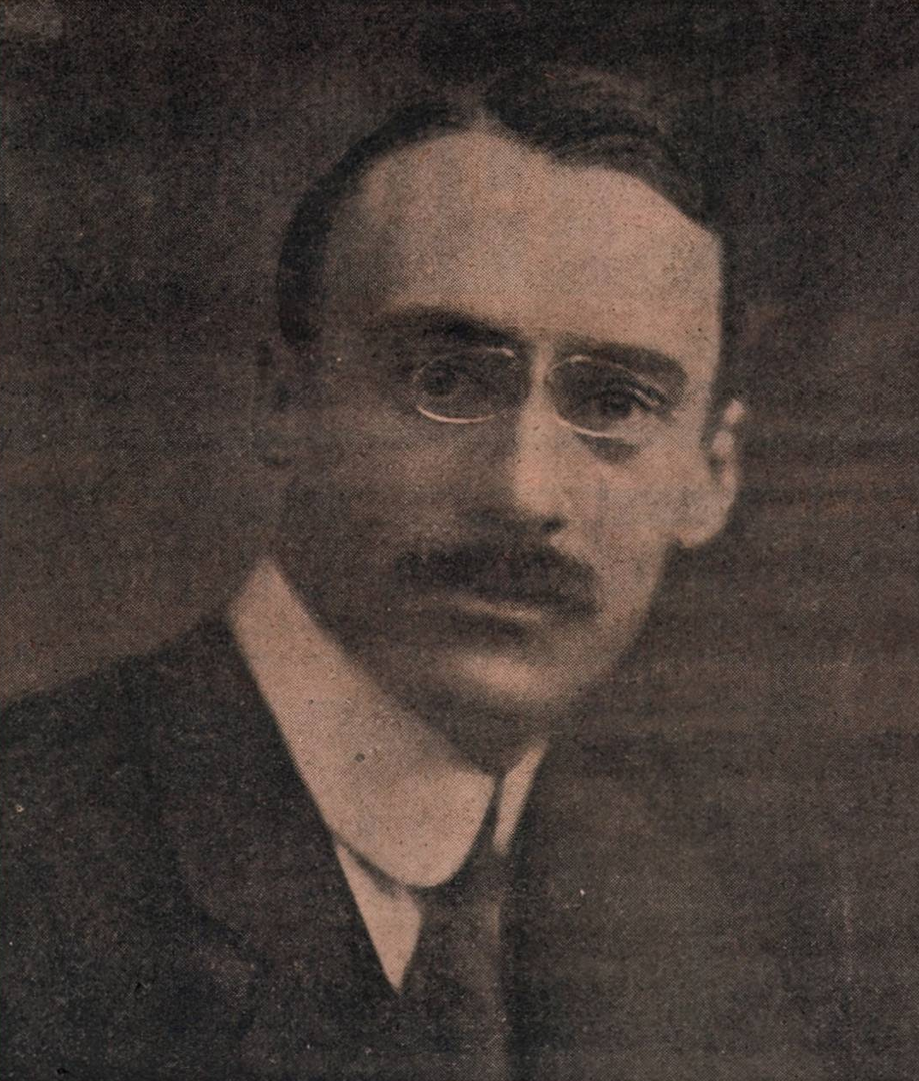
Ion G. Duca

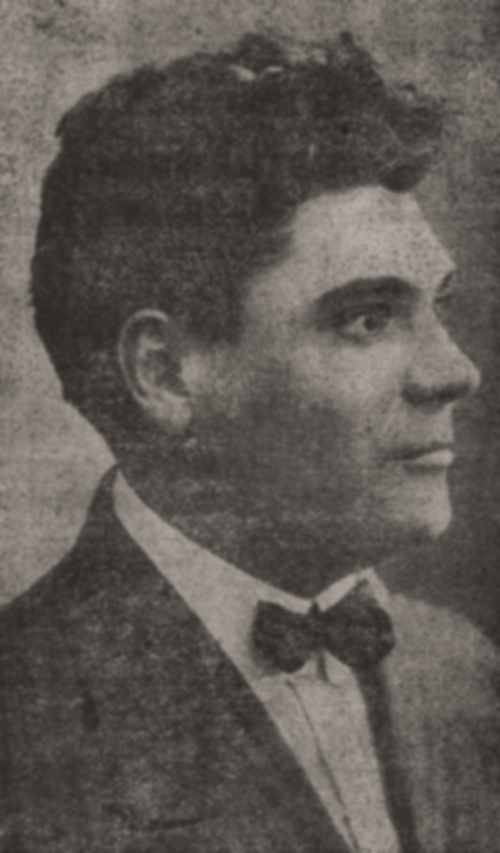
Petre Locusteanu

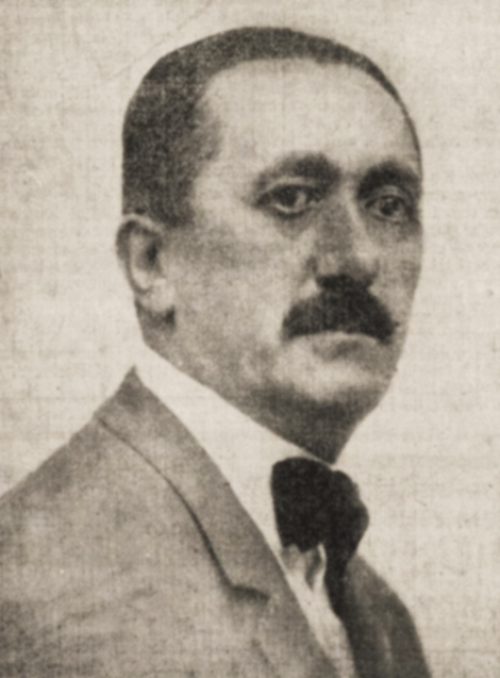
Alexandru Mavrodi

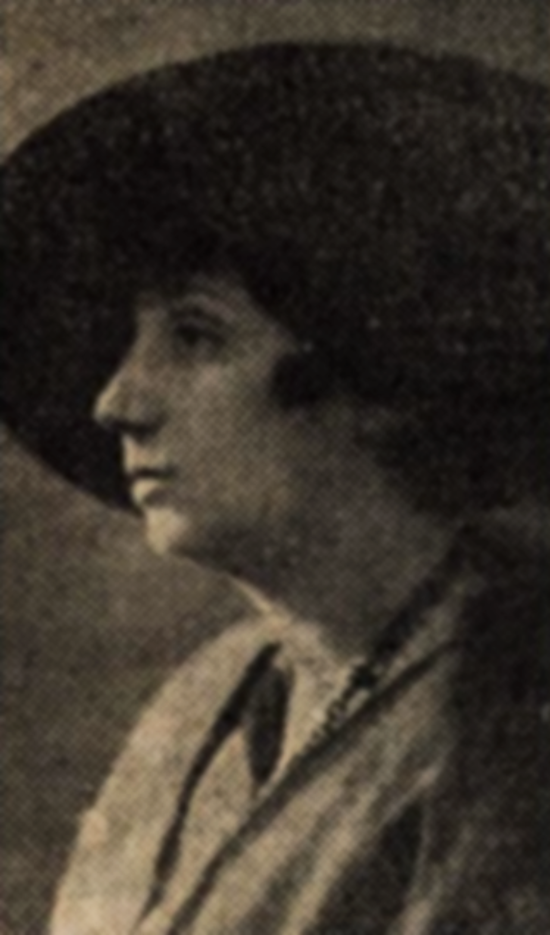
Claudia Millian

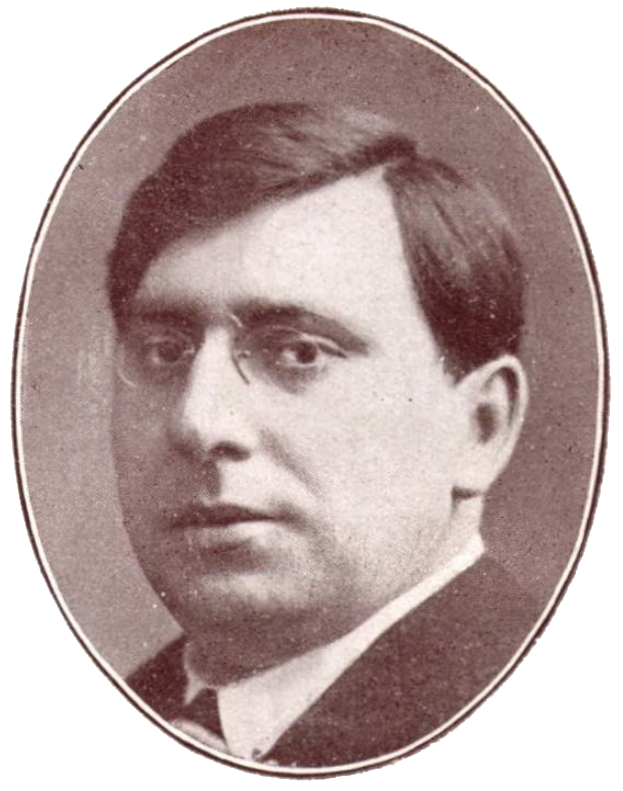
Ion Minulescu

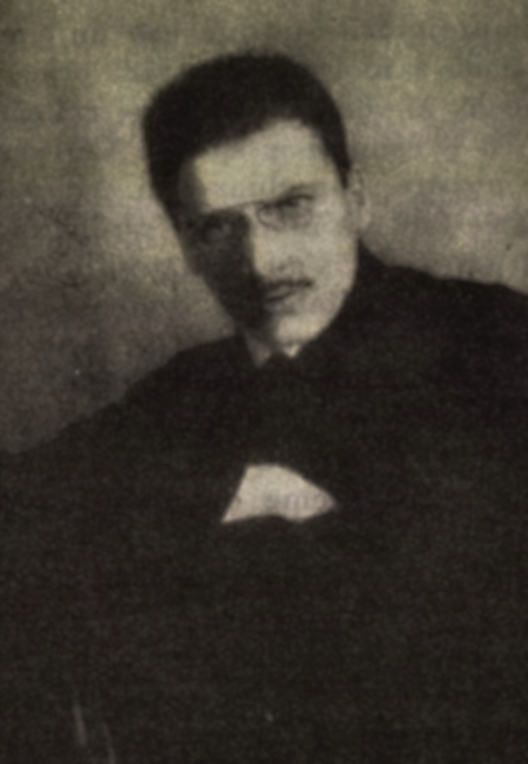
Vasile Savel

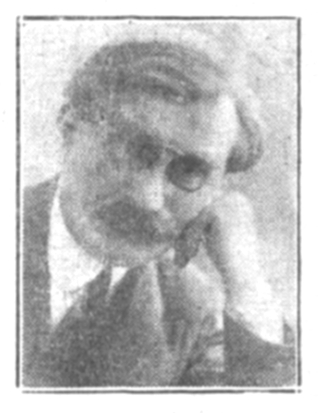
Henric Streitman

=== Vintilă's interventions ===
The PNL's leftists, increasingly self-identifying as "Poporanists", were regarded by the Conservative leader, Petre P. Carp, as themselves responsible for the 1907 revolt, and for similar acts of sedition. As one who had been indirectly implicated by Carp, Spiru Haret, the PNLțs former Education Minister, used Viitorul for his reply, published on 3 March 1912. Herein, Haret explained that the instigation he was guilty of was in defense of the people's education, self-help, and cooperative banking, and declared himself proud of this work. In early 1913, Vintilă Brătianu was identified in the Conservative press as leading Viitorul from the shadows, alongside Banu; Duca had reportedly stepped down, declaring that the paper was no longer a PNL mouthpiece. The Conservatives suspected that this was a ruse, allowing Viitorul to publish inflammatory articles that could not be traced back to the PNL leadership.

Soon after the Poporanist surge, Viitorul endorsed the PNL's promise of a sweeping land reform to benefit the landless peasantry, particularly so in September 1913—when it hosted the new PNL program, penned by Vintilă's older brother, Ion I. C. Brătianu, as a "famous open letter". As argued by historian Alin Marian Pîrvu, this text was directly motivated by the Second Balkan War, during which Romanian recruits had been unwittingly given a chance to compare egalitarian land relations that existed in the Tsardom of Bulgaria with the harsher realities at home. On the left, the emergent Social Democratic Party, which opposed the war and the subsequent annexation of Southern Dobruja, regarded Viitorul and the PNL as hypocritical—since the newspaper had been careful to downplay rumors of a stock market crash following the Bulgarian expedition, but had also tacitly endorsed the takeover of Dobrujan land. The newspaper sounded the alarm about the unpreparedness of the Romanian Land Forces, suggesting that the Conservatives were to blame for it. A main contributor on this topic was Gheorghe Becescu-Silvan, who, in October 1913, had to defend himself before a military tribunal for his reportage on the "squalor of the campaign".

I. I. C. Brătianu, who had joined the army as a regular recruit, also allowed Viitorul to publish the resignation of Nicolae Filipescu, who had served as the Conservative Ministry of War (therein, Filipescu argued that the Maiorescu cabinet was too soft on the Bulgarian issue). Filipescu became so regularly published in the 1913 edition of Viitorul that other journalists began jokingly referring to him as the "chief of the liberal party". Just shortly ahead of World War I, Parliament was set to reconvene as a constituent assembly, which had a mandate to debate and implement land and election reforms. As noted by Alexandru Marghiloman, the diarist and junior Conservative politician, in February 1914 the PNL tried to force its own program through—announcing, by way of Viitorul, that elections were scheduled for "this spring". Marghiloman asked for clarifications with King Carol I, who informed him that no such election would take place; he then speculated that the manipulative article had been drafted by I. I. C. Brătianu himself.

An electoral race ultimately took place in May, confirming Brătianu's new cabinet and a PNL majority in the constituent assembly. The legislature opened with a speech by Banu, selected by I. I. C. Brătianu because Viitorul had been skeptical toward Stere's more revolutionary agenda; shortly after, in an interview for the same newspaper, Finance Minister Emil Costinescu reassured voters that the PNL stood united around a moderate program. In July, the left-wing daily Adevărul observed that its adversaries were incoherent or manipulative: Viitorul gave ample exposure to Stere and his inner-party "League of Reforms", though it remained unclear if Brătianu, a man of "sphinx-like silence", still supported Stere. Meanwhile, Vintilă was taking a radical stance of land reform, proposing the expropriation of at least some landowners. This vision was popularized with Viitorul articles that he usually signed as "V. I. B"; they immediately sparked a polemic between Vintilă and the Conservative Barbu Ștefănescu Delavrancea (who argued that the landowners had a divine law on their side).

Poporanists and allies
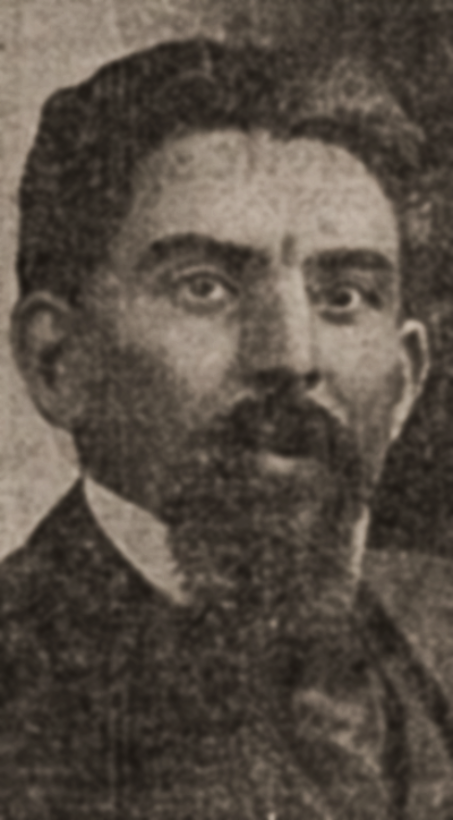
Gheorghe Becescu-Silvan

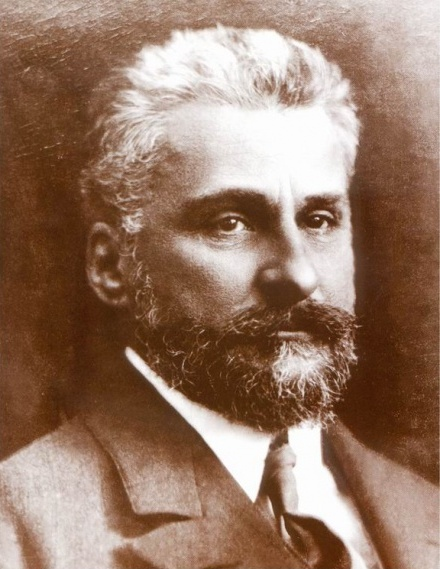
Vintilă Brătianu

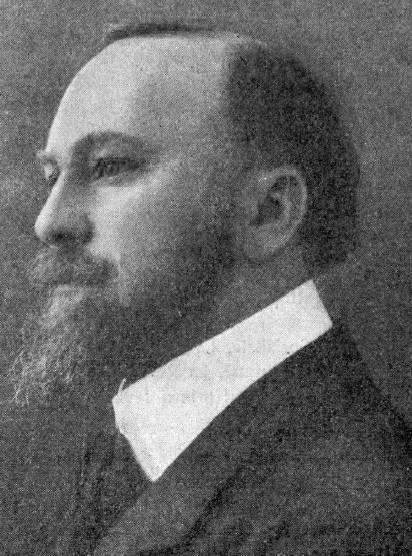
George Diamandy

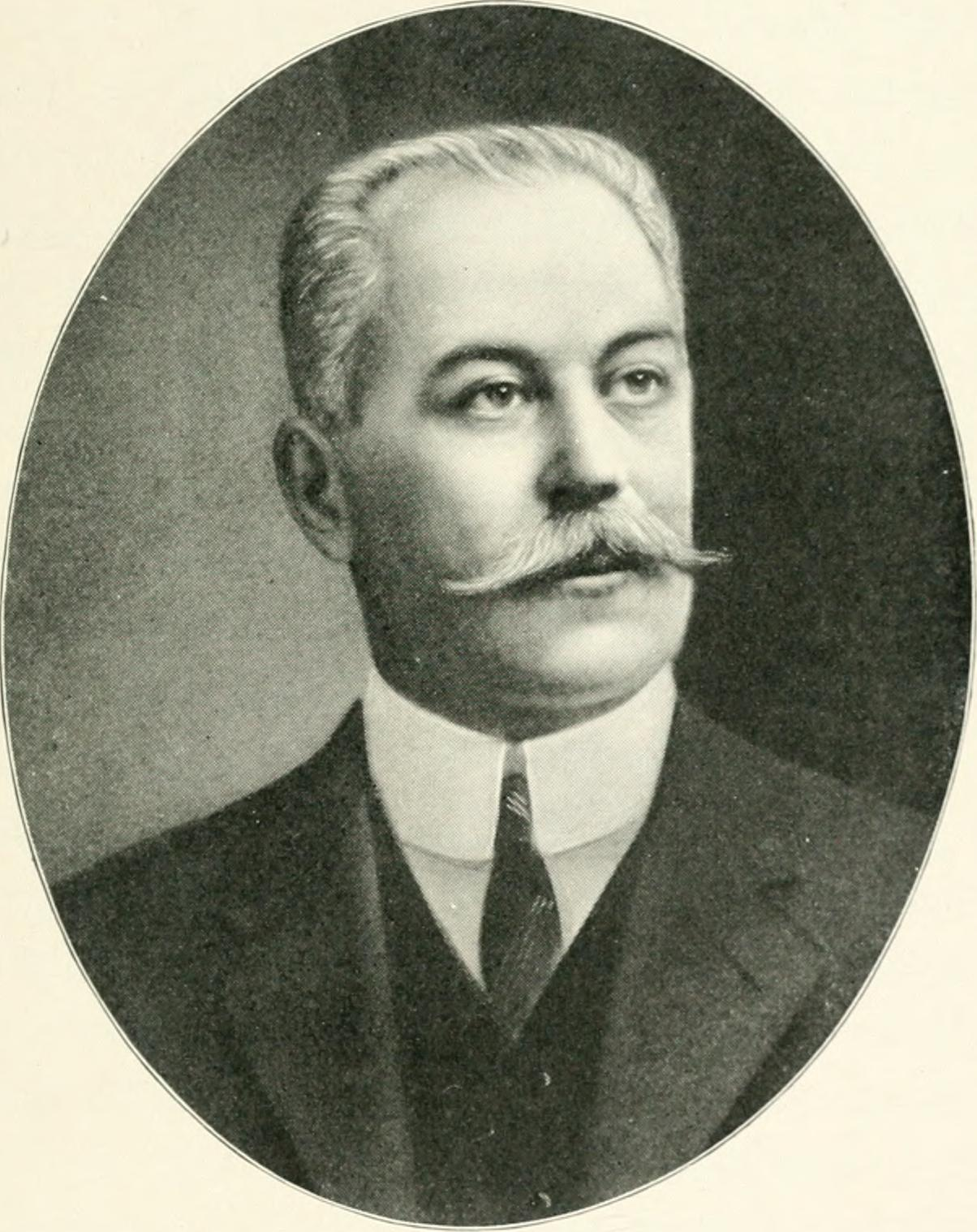
Nicolae Filipescu

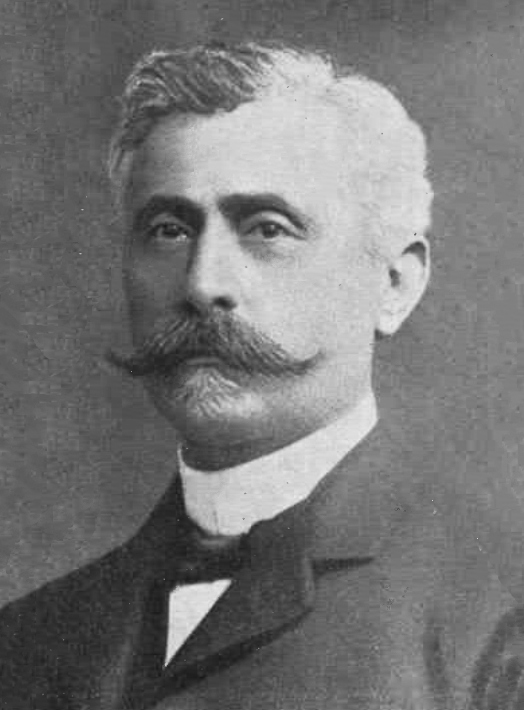
Spiru Haret

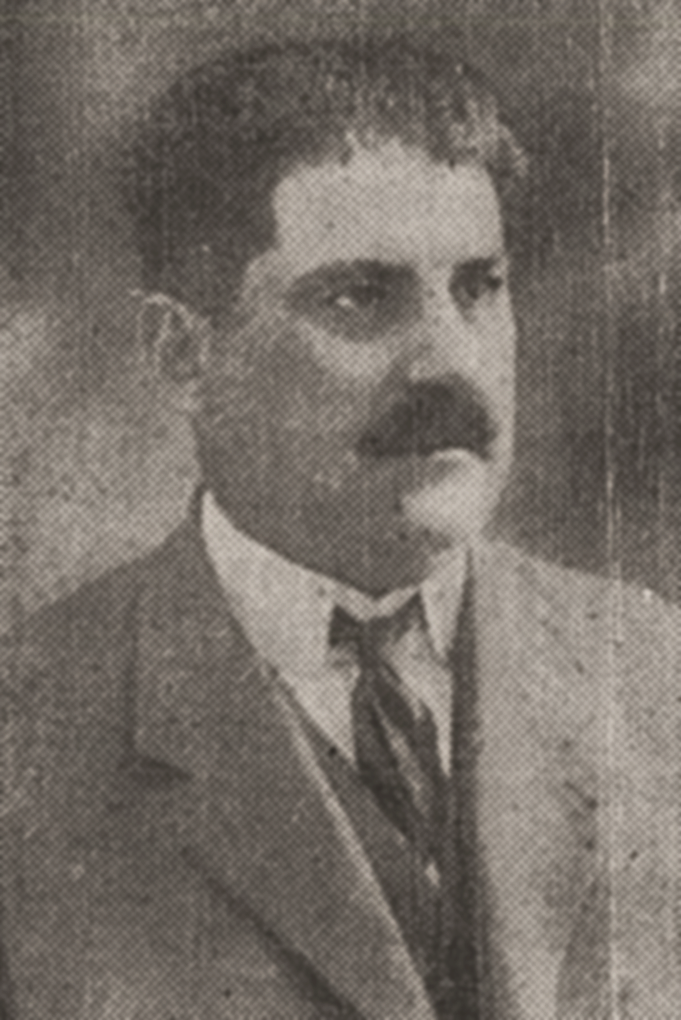
Constantin Stere

=== Neutrality period ===
Tensions between PNL reformists and moderates peaked during the first months of World War I, which also changed the cabinet's priorities. Whereas the country preserved its neutrality at I. I. C. Brătianu's behest, Viitorul supported the Triple Entente—to the point where, in October 1914, the Conservatives' Ion C. Grădișteanu accused it of forcing the country into war. A militant-Ententist position was taken by Hurmuz Aznavorian, who served as its foreign correspondent, though Viitorul also publicized Stere's ideas on the need to focus on a future unification with Bessarabia—and therefore on a rapprochement with the Central Powers. Among the early scoops produced by the newspaper was a report from the Ottoman Empire, alleging that the local population had come to resent the "military dictatorship" imposed on it by Otto Liman von Sanders. It also prominently featured fake news about a sweeping Entente victory in the First Battle of Ypres, and gave ample exposure to pro-Entente positions of some PNL ministers, including Costinescu. However, the writing staff was allegedly infiltrated by supporters and spies of the Central Powers. In March 1915, agents of the Siguranța counterintelligence detained Gheorghe Mărculescu Sobaru of Giurgiu, who was collecting news about the Balkans theater—sending them to be published both in Viitorul and its Germanophile competitor, Seara. Siguranța noted that these articles, though presented as scoops, were more likely renditions of Bulgarian propaganda.

In December 1914, Viitorul ackowledged that Austria-Hungary had achieved military superiority with its raids on Belgrade. The paper hosted much speculation about Bulgaria's own neutrality. As noted by Marghiloman, in early 1915 it had been persuaded by overzealous French propagandists, including Claude Anet and Frédéric Jenny, to announce that Bulgaria would enter as an Entente ally. The newspaper then intervened to reprimand Diamandy, who had announced that Romania was poised to join the war against the Central Powers. In February, it clashed with Ententist left, represented by Adevărul publisher Constantin Mille. It attacked the latter through claims made by Theodor Rășcanu, namely that Mille had taken bribes from the Russian embassy; Mille himself was able to obtain denials from all those whom Rășcanu had cited as witnesses, allowing him to proclaim that Viitorul was irresponsible and libelous. In July, Viitorul was used by Brătianu's cabinet to dismiss rumors that a new regional alliance was being formed between Romania, Bulgaria, and Greece. Also then, it engaged in a polemic with the Conservative-Democratic Party and its "National Action" movement, which wanted Romania to immediately join the Entente—by mid-1915, government was openly clashing with the Ententist opposition, leading Viitorul to cut down on its Ententist content.

Viitorul's own editorial line mirrored Brătianu's tactics: criticized by the French journalist René Moulin as transactional and petty, it supported a delayed intervention, waiting out for the Entente to be at a clear advantage. In late August, the newspaper informed its readers that "nothing had changed" in Romania's neutralist position. In September 1915, there were clear signs that Bulgaria was set to join the Central Powers, and was mobilizing its troops in preparation. The issue caused great distress at the National Action, and especially at its newspaper Epoca, led by the former Conservative Filipescu. Seeking retaliation, Epoca announced that Brătianu was preparing his resignation; the latter immediately laughed this off with a rebuttal appearing in Viitorul. While endorsing Brătianu's political leadership, the newspaper responded to Filipescu's allegations about mismanagement at the Ministry of War. Duca remembers this as a glorious moment for Viitorul, since it was able to publicly refute the claims made by its adversaries. During the debate, Viitorul veered into personal attacks aimed at Nicolae's son, Grigore Filipescu. As Duca notes, this "ugly turn" may have seriously harmed Filipescu Sr's already frail health. Marghiloman suggests that Grigore was in the right, but unwise in the methods chosen for his own defense. In November, the younger Filipescu pounced upon Viitorul editor M. D. Berlescu, who had to be rescued by bystanders.

Though it still published literary works (including early poems by the Jewish writer H. Bonciu), Viitorul was absorbed by the contextual political scandals. In December 1915, it publicized a speech by PNL activist Mihail Orleanu, which indicated that all the party wanted Romania to join the Entente, as a way of "fulfilling its national ideal" regarding Transylvania, but also that only Brătianu could decide on the "opportune moment." The Central Powers were by then interested in swaying public opinion against the intervention, and began paying off various Romanian newspapermen—including Viitorul's Saniel Grossman. Though categorically denied by Banu with an explanatory piece, the rumor was confirmed when the Siguranța sifted through the notebooks of foreign spies that it had arrested. It was also confirmed in Duca's memoirs, though he also noted that Grossman, whom he presented as a "scribe" and the only Jew left at Viitorul, only took "modest sums". A 1920 inquest launched by the Assembly of Deputies additionally discovered that, in early 1916, the German Empire had also subsidized Viitorul as a whole, by means of the Deutsche Bank.

During the early days of 1916, Viitorul defended government's de-facto ban on grain exports to Germany, even as factions of the PNL were describing it as a hopeless and destructive policy. In July, still at Viitorul, Mavrodi was circulating rumors that the Bulgarian Land Forces had clashed with Romanian troops in Southern Dobruja. On 24 August, when King Ferdinand I celebrated his birthday, the newspaper praised his leadership, noting that the ultimate resolution regarding "the country's highest interests" was a prerogative of the throne. It therefore deferred to Ferdinand the decision of going to war. The paper welcomed Romania's belated entry into the conflict, as an Entente country, which occurred just four days after the royal celebration. Its editor, Spiru Hasnaș, contacted the Transylvanian exile George Coșbuc to obtain a celebratory piece from him, but never received it. After retaliatory air bombing by the Luftstreitkräfte, Romanian civilians demanded the seizure of any goods owned by the German community; against Marghiloman's advice, Duca published this appeal in Viitorul. Covering a Romanian defeat at Turtucaia, it featured a strongly anti-Bulgarian article by the philologist Ioan Bianu, who, as a Germanophile, was keeping entirely silent about the other Central Powers. Those killed during the defensive action were also honored with a poem by Ludovic Dauș, published in Viitorul and later in Coșbuc's own Albina.

Neutrality-era and late-1916 contributors
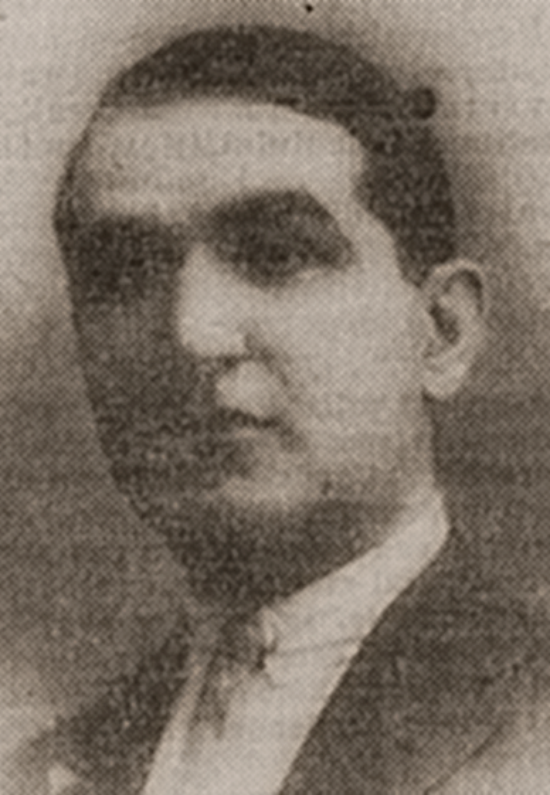
Hurmuz Aznavorian

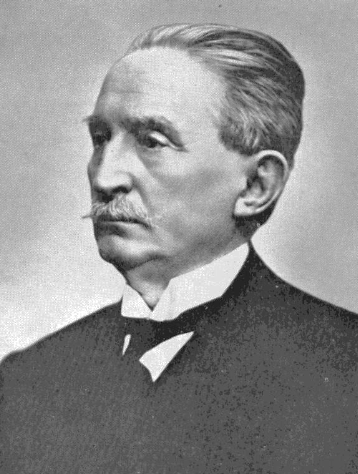
Ioan Bianu

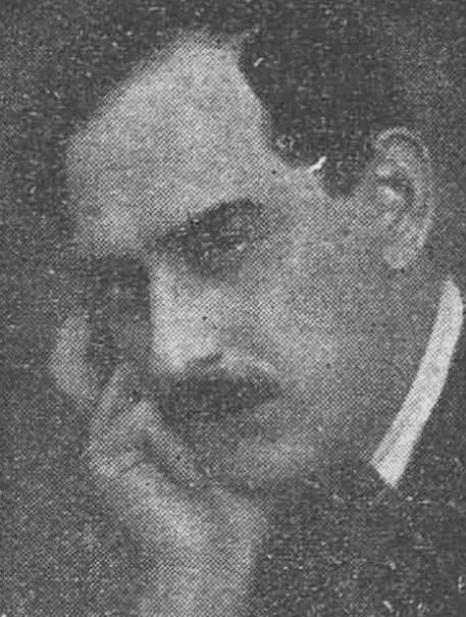
H. Bonciu

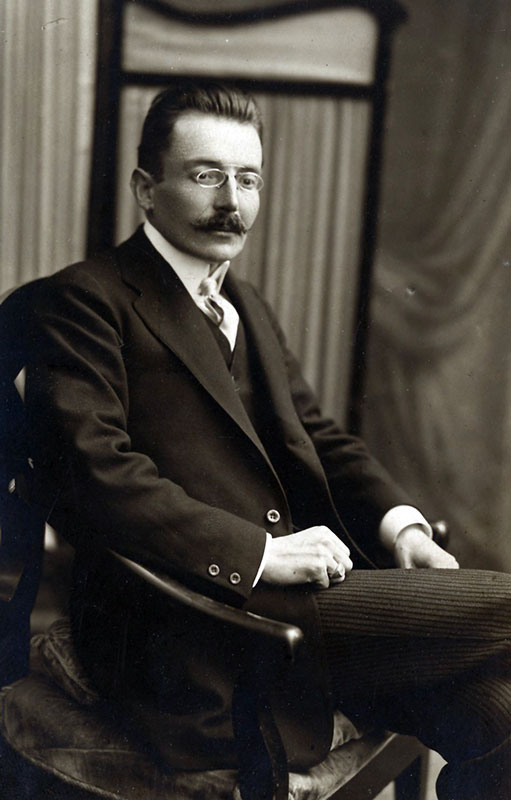
Ludovic Dauș

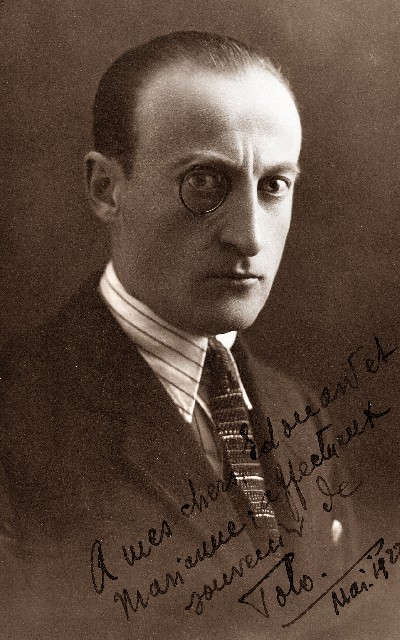
Theodor Rășcanu

== Wartime catastrophe and later triumph ==
=== 1916 closure and 1918 revival ===
On 17 October 1916, Viitorul discussed the war as one of national liberation: "We, the Romanians, do not covet for foreign land, neither do we aim, as our enemies do, to invade and submit other peoples. We only want to free our brothers from bondage". It covered the Romanian incursion into Transylvania with a measure of optimism: it declared the counteroffensive, whereby the enemy broke into the Romanian Carpathians, as a temporary setback, while announcing that the Romanians "are [still] learning how to wage a war". It reassured public opinion, including "some capitalists from the neutral countries", that Romania's oil industry was not threatened with destruction, and also that government was increasing the weapons' supply.

The paper's inaugural series ended once the Central Powers had stormed into much of Romania-proper, ultimately reaching Bucharest and settling in as the occupier of most Romanian regions. The government relocated to Iași, and was followed there by many in the literary field and in the political press. Duca, alongside Viitorul colleagues such as Hasnaș, joined the editorial staff of a local PNL journal, Mișcarea. The situation was only reversed by the September 1918 campaigns; the renewed association with the Entente also led to the fall of the Marghiloman cabinet, which had been mandated with appeasing the Central Powers. A second series of Viitorul was put out from 2 November 1918. It was reopened at roughly the same time as another Ententist paper, Universul, and coincided with crowds storming into the offices of a Germanophile paper, Steagul; immediately after, it became noted for its "violent attack" against Alexandru Tzigara-Samurcaș, who had been leader of the police forces answering to the German occupiers. It also targeted biologist Grigore Antipa, who had supplied food for the German Army, as a "friend of our enemies", "the embodiment of a perfidious acolyte". Some time later, it began circulating a claim that Marghiloman had negotiated with the head German occupier, August von Mackensen, to ensure that Mackensen could withdraw from Romania; this and other allegations prompted Marghiloman to refer to the newspaper editors as "bandits" and libelers.

Brătianu's triumphant return to power at the head of another PNL cabinet also brought a settling of scores with the Ententists who had escaped to Paris, including Take Ionescu, as well as with the People's Party (PP), formed in Iași by General Alexandru Averescu. Through Viitorul, Brătianu denied that the former represented Romania in any official capacity, and rejected any offer of collaboration with the latter. Faced with mounting opposition from the PP and Romanian National Party (PNR), the PNL and its organ sought to reconnect with the Paris group, but their offer of collaboration swiftly rejected by Ionescu. As assessed in a 1919 report of the French Foreign Ministry, Viitorul remained a paper of "average importance", though also the PNL's second most circulated, after the more politically significant L'Indépendance Roumaine. In a contrasting note, the trade magazine La Publicité reported that Viitorul ran at 50,000 copies per issue, whereas L'Indépendance Roumaine only put out 5,000, with both being well short of Universul (with 90,000). I. G. Cătuneanu, formerly a mainstay of the Viitorul writing team, was made head of the national censorship apparatus—in which position he began curbing the spread of opposition newspapers.

In 1918–1919, poet Corneliu Moldovanu was emplyed on Viitorul's permanent staff. Nonetheless, for a while after this reinstatement, it had very sporadic literary contributions, usually with nationalistic or monarchist messaging—one of Claudia Millian's patriotic works and a monarchist poem by Nichifor Crainic both appeared in celebration of the "Great Union". As noted by Marghiloman, the actual union of Transylvania with Romania was given vague exposure in Viitorul. This was because Brătianu's centralizing policies had been thwarted by the PNR, which had decided to maintain a Transylvanian regional government. Leftist opposition also intensified, particularly so during the typographers' strike of 6 December; Viitorul was the only press organ to be printed throughout these incidents, by strike-breakers guarded by an infantry regiment. The PNL consequently allowed violent retaliation against trade unionists such as I. C. Frimu. However, when Frimu was murdered in prison, Viitorul tried to play down the incident, alleging that he had died of typhus. Its attitude was met with indignation by the PP's Îndreptarea, which argued: "Any such defense is both ridiculous and odious."

=== 1919 feats ===
The PNL arranged that new party newspapers set up in the provinces use Viitorul in their name, and a regional qualifier. A quick succession of papers followed, beginning in 1919 with one such satellite established in Suceava (as Viitorul Sucevei). In January of that year, the Bucharest paper had returned at the center of public debates, with demands that all journalists who had previously collaborated with the Central Powers, including Arghezi and Grossman, be arrested and tried as traitors. Its other content at that stage included essays about the role of theaters in promoting "national education", as well as samples from the declassified letters of Ottokar Czernin, who had represented the Austro-Hungarian government in Romania, and the full text of Brătianu's 1916 treaty with the Entente. In tandem, it again challenged the left-wing Ententists at Adevărul, in particular Constantin Mille, with an open letter from Captain Gheorghe Băgulescu—which suggested that Mille was an inconsequential journalist, and always "for sale".

According to Marghiloman, Viitorul also maintained a "terrorizing atmosphere" during the trial of Colonel Victor Verzea, who, in February, was ultimately sentenced to death for spying. As the same diarist notes, by early 1919 Viitorul was engaged in rewriting the history of the war, and presenting the union of Bessarabia with Romania, which had occurred under Marghiloman's watch, without even mentioning that fact. He and the newspaper staff still agreed with each other on the need to do away with the PNR's regionalism. As read by the former Germanophile Ioan C. Filitti, by February 1919 Viitorul was also acknowledging, if grudgingly so, that Marghiloman had been at least partly right in his negotiations with the conquerors. By May, Viitorul had switched focus on Averescu, whom it claimed to expose as a former appeaser of the Germans. This allegation enraged PP cadres, with Îndreptarea observing that calumny was a characteristic of PNL propaganda.

Both Viitorul and Steagul followed developments in the Russian Civil War, and agreed on the need to contain Soviet Russia, but reached significantly different conclusions on the best available tactic: Steagul argued for using German troops against the Red Army; this was regarded as unacceptable by Viitorul, who nonetheless agreed with Winston Churchill's warning that a German–Soviet rapprochement would result in a "new catastrophe" for the rest of Europe. Early in this new edition, much of the content was centered on justifying and defending the new Romanian borders, including against the Hungarian Soviet Republic. As the Paris Peace Conference began, the PNL and its press campaigned for Romania's recognition as an Entente belligerent, asking that the country's withdrawal from the war in early 1918 be discounted. Reflecting government's official position, Viitorul also proposed that the Romanian border in the west be granted precisely as promised in 1916.

In late March, as the Soviet Hungarian government declared a state of war with Romania, Viitorul unwittingly evidenced the PNL's indifference, only publishing news of this after they had appeared in a local newspaper (and not from an official source). During the brief Romanian campaign in Hungary, it announced that the families of soldiers killed in battle would be receiving agricultural tools and livestock from among those deemed to have been stolen by the Central Powers during their previous occupation of Romania. The subsequent Romanian occupation of Budapest was ended on orders from the Entente, issued at the Peace Conference in November 1919—the news of which were reported with noted dissatisfaction by Viitorul. The occupation then gave way to a conservative Regency of Hungary, which slowly returned to an inimical stance toward its neighbors. In October 1920, Viitorul carried a "long article on Hungarian duplicity", exploring the chasm that existed between, on one hand, Pál Teleki's assurances of friendship toward Romania, and, on the other, its cultivation of anti-Romanian groups such as Ébredő Magyarok. By 1920, Viitorul was also monitoring the activity of Hungarian Romanians, and alleging that EMKE, their cultural association, had a secret agenda in favor of Hungarian irredentism.

=== 1920–1922 interlude ===
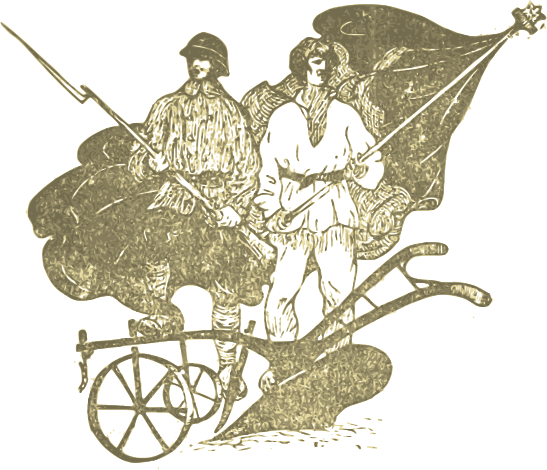
Propaganda image in a PNL "village voters' calendar", published ahead of the November 1919 elections: a soldier and the plowman rallying in front of the Romanian tricolor

Ahead of general elections of late 1919, the PNL was reportedly favored by the caretaker military government, which also intensified its repression against the left-wing groups of Greater Romania, including the new Socialist Party. Le Populaire reported at the time that government made sure to limit the circulation of leftist newspapers, whereas "Viitorul, a paper of the liberal party but in actuality the true organ of this current government, appears in a six-page edition and is distributed at no charge". In an attempt to harm the PP's growing popularity, it published wartime documents purporting to show contacts between Averescu and the All-Ukrainian Central Executive Committee, a communist entity headed by Christian Rakovsky. Marghiloman, who was familiar with these texts, believed that they were also irrelevant; when the paper followed up with statements showing that Averescu had once courted Germanophiles such as Constantin Stere, he remarked that these generally evidenced the hypocrisy of Ententists.

According to Marxist historian V. Liveanu, the 1919 election, carried by universal male suffrage, saw the PNL expunging its Poporanists and "generous ones", only maintaining tiny and "bourgeois" left-wing factions, manned by figures such as Ioan Nădejde and Alexandru Vlahuță. Its electoral program, carried in Viitorul, recognized the need for some leftist-inspired social reforms, such as the eight-hour day and a minimum wage; according to Liveanu, these were entirely lifted from the Socialists' platform. In the new political climate, the PNL mainly stood for economic nationalism (sometimes called "neoliberalism" in a Romanian context), with ideological essays being penned by Duca and Vintilă Brătianu. In a 1921 piece for Viitorul, the latter explained that the country's economic revival could only have been brought about "through our own powers". Also in Viitorul, he recommended government spending in infrastructure works, including a program of rural electrification. As early as 1919, Viitorul had hosted an art column, with contributors such as Alexandru Agnese and Traian Cornescu. Involved with the Romanian Writers' Society, by 1922 it was awarding a C. A. Rosetti prize (worth 20,000 lei) to the best local novels.

When the PNR finally took power with Alexandru Vaida-Voevod as prime minister, Viitorul attacked him and his government team as an "instrument for [Romania's] economic enslavement", whose activities could only convince Romanians that Transylvanians needed to be kept out of national affairs. Throughout late 1920, the newspaper was focusing its attacks on the then-governing PP and the Averescu cabinet. It deplored the new laws regulating the oil industry, arguing that the PP had abandoned national reserves to the Royal Dutch.

Viitorul also mounted a campaign against Duiliu Zamfirescu, a novelist who was serving as Chairman of the Deputies' Assembly on behalf of the PP-led majority. The critique focused on Zamfirescu's stint as manager of the Reșița Works in Transylvania, which had passed under partial state ownership; Viitorul alleged that this was a conflict of interest. Adam reports that the campaign was double-edged. Viitorul, as the more respectable PNL mouthpiece, focused on current issues, while a more scandal-prone "rag", România Nouă, published unreliable revelations about Zamfirescu's alleged Germanophile past—eventually, it found itself exposed for its own connections with the Deutsche Bank. Zamfirescu declared himself perplexed by the accusations, seeing them as motivated by the "perfidy of liberal bankers", who were used to mixing business and politics when approaching rivals. He challenged Mavrodi to a duel, but the latter declined to show up.

The PNL returned to power in early 1922, and was popularly confirmed by general elections in March. A controversy ensued when the opposition declared these to have been rigged, walking out of the legislature; Viitorul mounted the counterattack, with "insulting epithets" against the hostile parties, whom it accused of "deserting [their] duties". In 1922–1923, the sixth Brătianu cabinet began enacting a series of structural reforms, including by adopting a new constitution and by enacting land redistribution. This period revised some of the PNL's core stances, including on the issue of Jewish emancipation—which was now codified into law, leading to a series of nationalist protests and riots. In that context, Viitorul was also becoming lenient toward the Judaic community: in early 1923, it called upon antisemitic students to put their "nervousness" in check, so as not to harm Romania's image abroad; it also promised that the government would compensate in other fields, namely by improving the students' living conditions. Reflecting government policy, it spoke at length about the Little Entente's policy on minorities, educating the public about Romania's commitment to such equal-treatment clauses. However, in September, it openly celebrated when Aristide Briand of the French Radical-Socialists criticized the League of Nations for being too strict about the issue of minority rights.

Vintilă's transitional team
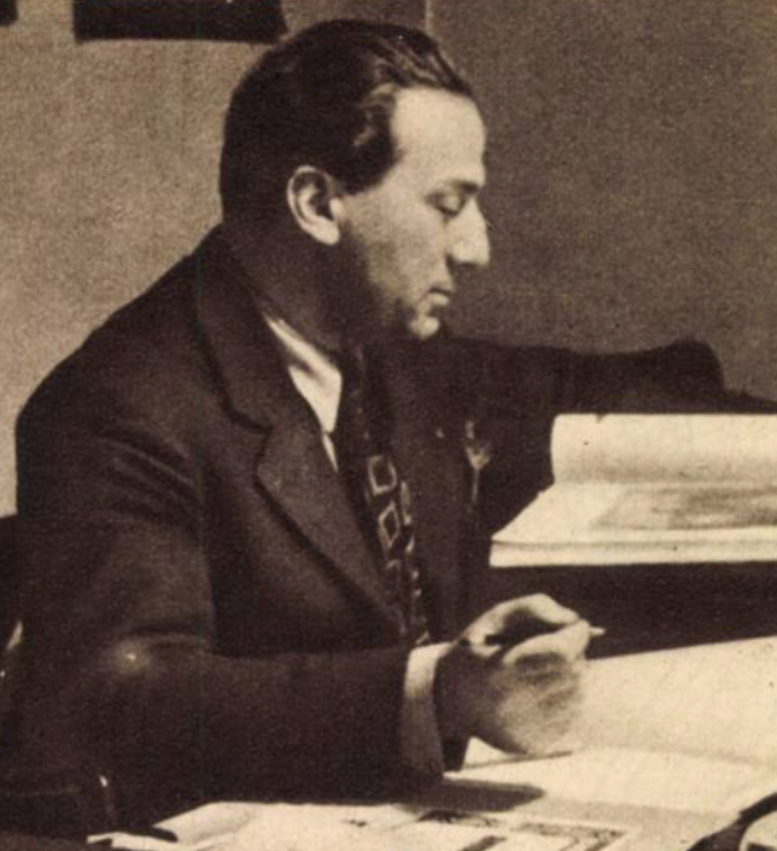
Traian Cornescu

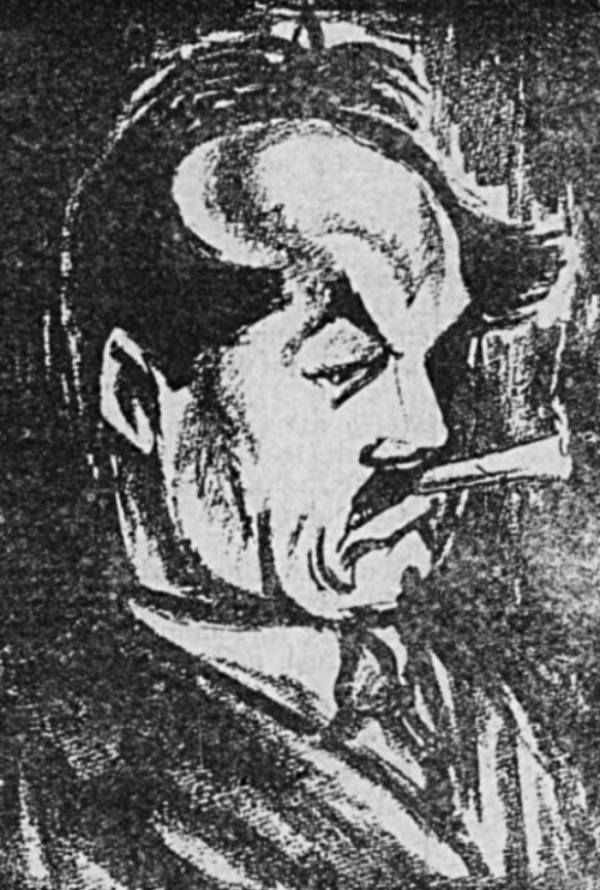
Nichifor Crainic

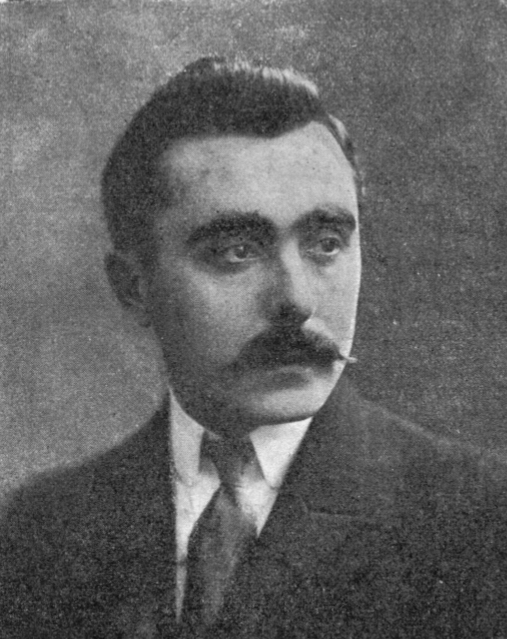
Corneliu Moldovanu

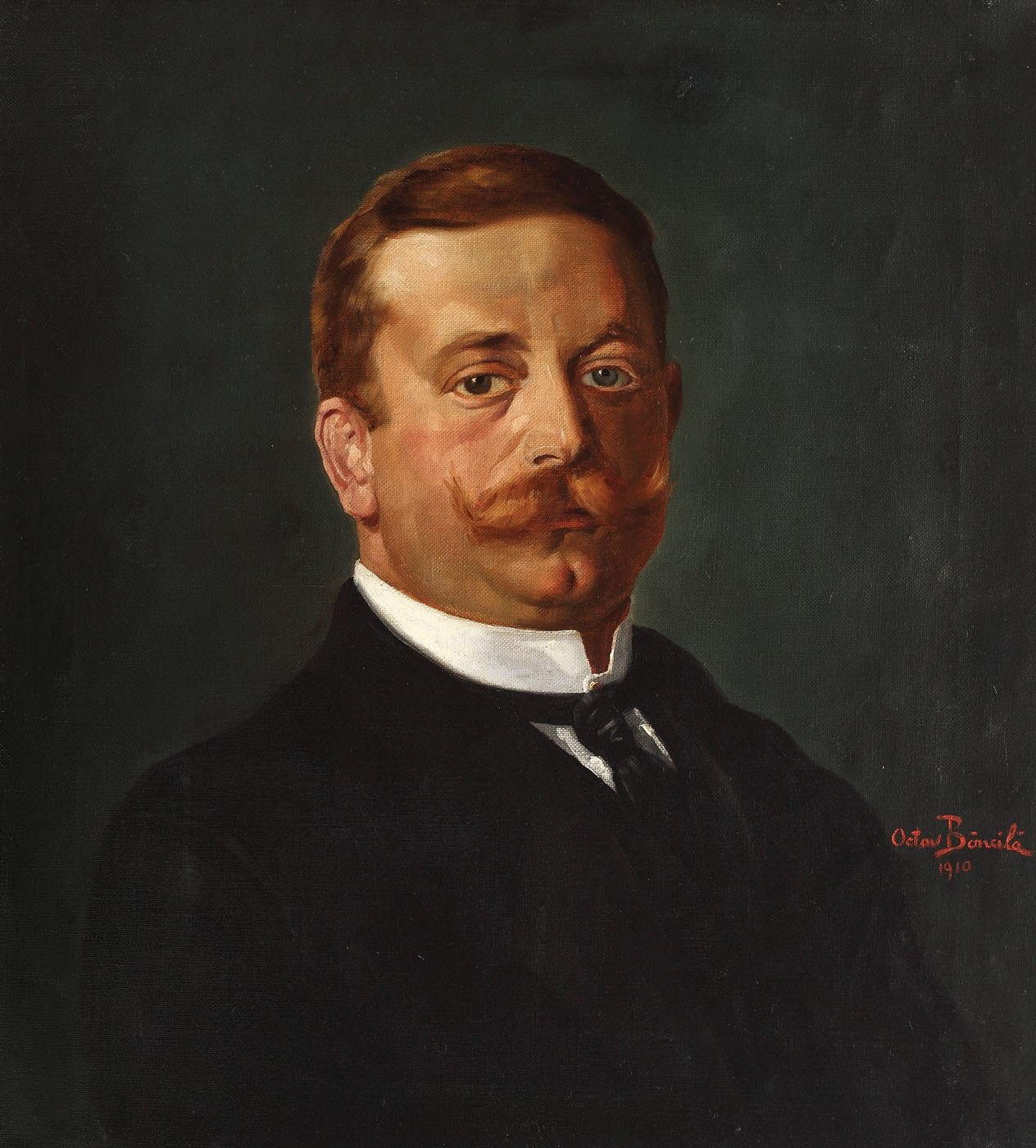
Ioan Nădejde

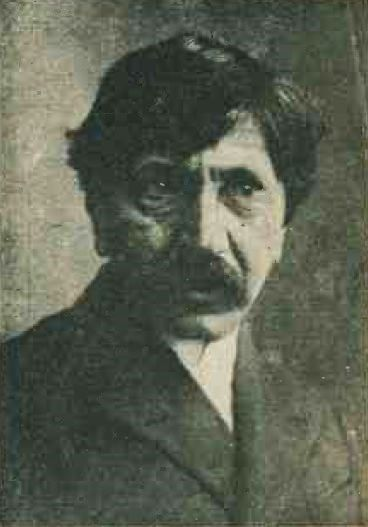
Alexandru Vlahuță

=== Full shift to the right ===
The regime was consolidated in October 1922, when Ferdinand was symbolically crowned as king of all the Romanians in a ceremony at Alba Iulia. This gesture was covered in Viitorul as a veritable culmination of the nation's history. As I. I. C. Brătianu carried out his promise of land reform, the PNL had come to be opposed by a more purist agrarian force, the Peasants' Party, which sought to reestablish Romania as a peasant state. The PNL mouthpiece, which was allegedly allocated free or subsidized paper at the height of nation-wide shortages, went on the offensive, declaring that the new group was an "adventurers' crew" of "brazen ignorance." It also took up the task of criticizing the Peasantists' own constitutional project, which was partly drafted by Stere—whom Viitorul repeatedly depicted as a former Germanophile. The PNL now equated the consolidation of left-wing agrarianism with infiltration by the Soviet Union. This narrative was enhanced in mid-1924, during the Tatarbunary Uprising—when, as the left-wing journalist Ion Vinea noted, Viitorul insisted that the whole of Bessarabia was in the grip of communist agents. The paper also advanced fabricated claims that Stere, on behalf of the Peasantists, had met with Soviet diplomats, and implied that he had discussed the possibility of abandoning Bessarabia to the enemy. In tandem, the paper published editorial pieces against the unionization of academic staff at Stere's own University of Iași.

Both the party and its mouthpiece were now perceived as decisively right-wing: a 1928 article in Bernard Lecache's Cri des Peuples calls out the paper as part of the "Romanian right-wing press", and also as one of the "more despicably reactionary journals"; literary historian Ioan Adam sees it as a leading "organ of the liberals' financial oligarchy". Like most Romanian newspapers, Viitorul voiced its admiration for Italian fascism as early as 1922, describing the March on Rome as a necessary step against communism (while still expressing some reserves about fascist radicalism and its unpredictable effect on Italy–Romania relations). As explained in a 1929 editorial in Viitorul, the PNL was still "decisively left-wing" when compared to the regrouped conservatives of the Vlad Țepeș League or to the Romanian fascist groups—as the main point of contention, the National Liberals rejected dictatorship and limited their critique of democracy. On the far-right, the National Romanian Fascio expressed admiration for Vintilă's fiscal conservatism (as theorized in the PNL organ), but also commented negatively on his supposed indifference toward inflation.

Questioned by the National-Christian Defense League (LANC) regarding their supposed duplicity on the "Jewish Question", Viitorul and other PNL organs declared that they had only ever opposed those Jews who "work against [Romania's] interests", and that they themselves were, overall, anti-Zionists. In October 1923, after the authorities had arrested Corneliu Zelea Codreanu and other antisemitic youths for their attempt to assassinate government ministers and Adevărul editors, Viitorul raised alarm about the conspiracy's intellectual instigator—namely, the LANC's A. C. Cuza. Two years later, the newspaper congratulated Wilhelm Filderman for his monograph on Jewish loyalism toward Romania.

Once Banu had parted with Viitorul, Mavrodi could emerge as its unchallenged director. He began keeping special files on all public figures, that he then allegedly used to extort them into compliance. Vinea noted that a denunciation by Viitorul was enough to intimidate most professional politicians, including those on the far-left, which meant that workers soon learned how to best represent their own interests. The paper's Red Scare-tactics, once censured by Duca himself, had unforeseen results: Viitorul was amply quoted by Hungarian papers such as the Pester Lloyd, which took the news to mean that Romanians had trouble governing themselves. In late 1924, Viitorul and Universul published letters supposedly from the Krestintern, which they used as evidence that a Peasantist militant, Nicolae L. Lupu, was sympathetic toward the Soviet Union—and involved, alongside the Soviets, in the worldwide "insurrectionist movement". Lupu dismissed the documents as forgeries. When, in August 1925, the Peasantists won partial elections in Bessarabia's Lăpușna County, Viitorul deplored them as a victory for secessionists and Russophiles. According to Vinea, the claim seemed merely "idiotic", but was more likely a pretext, meant to justify the increase of persecution. A while after, Viitorul had to deal with the uncomfortable realization that Stere was well-liked and protected by Ferdinand. It also contradicted itself, and became the target of Vinea's jibes, when it occasionally proposed the normalization of Romanian–Soviet relations, which also required the toning-down of its anti-communist rhetoric.

== 1920s challenges ==
=== PNL consolidation and 1927 decline ===
The paper was the voice of Francophile Romanians, and, around the time of the coronation, carried an article deploring the apparent decline of French cultural influence in the country. As it noted at the time, Romanian intellectuals were growing more familiar with, and enthusiastic about, German philosophy. Viitorul was pleasantly impressed when, in January 1925, Stefan Frecôt established a separate caucus for the French-speaking section of the Banat Swabians, noting that such divisions would limit the spread of Pan-Germanism. In early 1927, it censured an exhibit in Weimar Germany, which showcased handicrafts of the Transylvanian Saxons, seeing it "obscur[ing] the Romanian character of Romania in the eyes of the outside world." The claim was met with a rebuttal from Germany's Foreign Minister, Gustav Stresemann. The newspaper also reflected the PNL's political line in respect to Transylvanian Hungarians, and was still skeptical of their communal rights. A regional paper in Békés mocked Viitorul's "howling" against the establishment of a new Hungarian school in Târgu Mureș (or Marosvásárhely), adding: "the Romanian statisticians will not have much trouble at all in demonstrating that there is not a single living soul in Marosvásárhely who is Hungarian or Székely!"

Coverage of literature remained politicized over those years: upon the death of the conservative Transylvanian novelist Ioan Slavici, the Viitorul staff only discussed him as a Germanophile and a traitor to Romania. In 1925–1926, Viitorul hosted literary columns by a conservative critic, Mihail Dragomirescu. His collaboration ended after he began berating Eugen Lovinescu, the modernist-and-liberal ideologue. Around the same time, Viitorul featured Alexandru Cazaban's attacks on the (then-communist) novelist Panait Istrati—Istrati's defenders at Contimporanul laughed these off as "yelping out of Viitorul's basement" (in other pieces for Contimporanul and other journals, Vinea suggested that Viitorul was merely a front of the Siguranța, with "moronic" articles that dismissed all its enemies as Soviet hirelings).

The newspaper's solution to preserving the international peace was increasingly reliant on proposals for regional alliances. While Ferdinand was having his official crowning ceremony, Constantine I of Greece, who had just been deposed, described the existence of a working alliance between Romania, Yugoslavia, and the Hellenic Republic. Viitorul caused "profound agitation" by not denying that this was the case, and by implicitly validating the notion that Brătianu was assisting Greek guerrillas against the Turkish National Movement in East Thrace. By 1924, Duca, as the minister of foreign affairs, went public with his project for European peace—unwittingly exposing the Little Entente's disunion when Viitorul, who republished his speeches, found itself mocked by the Yugoslav press. Viitorul also became involved in the Pan-Latinist movement, sending Pompiliu Păltânea to attend a "Fifth Congress of the Latin Press", held in the Kingdom of Spain during July 1927 (Păltânea was received there by Prime Minister Miguel Primo de Rivera).

In late March 1926, as one of its final moves, the Brătianu cabinet successfully introduced a majority bonus system, giving political strength to any future governments. The legislation infuriated the opposition (with the exception of the PP), being described by its exponents as the backbone of an authoritarian coup. Vinea saw the paper as standing out for the "counterrevolution", "the return of the 'oligarchy' to the political affairs from which it had been removed." The legislation was defended by Viitorul as doing away with needless parliamentary "struggles", and thus inaugurating an "era of disciplined and fecund work". While canvassing for support of the changes, it published an alleged dialogue between Stere and Averescu, which supposedly evidenced that the Peasantists were extorting the PP into outvoting Brătianu. The Peasantist organ, Aurora, claimed instead that the dialogue was entirely fabricated by Viitorul.

As reported by Vinea, the PNL had reached an understanding with the PP: later in 1926, it was controlling the country through a proxy third Averescu cabinet. Through articles in Viitorul, it was pressuring its ministers into eliminating rent-control laws and cancelling state contracts that had not been vetted by its patrons. In exchange for cooperation at a central level, the newspaper kept silent when provincial journals of the PNL appeared "mutilated" by government censorship. Viitorul nevertheless spoke out against the interior minister, Octavian Goga, during antisemitic university riots in December 1926. It highlighted the clash between Averescu's message that students "have primarily to look after their studies" and Goga's tacit encouragement of the rioters.

=== In the dynastic crisis ===
In early 1927, Vintilă Brătianu sparked another conflict with the Averescans by criticizing in Viitorul their proposed reduction of tariffs. Instead, the newspaper aired another PNL policy, namely the revision of income taxes. In addition to observing the Peasantists, I. I. C. Brătianu was feeling his position threatened by the Transylvanian-centered PNR. Initially, Viitorul gave intense coverage to any sign of distrust between the PNR's Iuliu Maniu and his Peasantist allies, repeatedly claiming that the two movements were barely compatible with each another, and also that Stere's emerging faction was in disagreement with both sets of leaders. As the PNR was establishing direct contacts with Ferdinand, the paper featured allegations that Maniu was secretly against the monarchy, and instead gave positive coverage to another Transylvanian faction, headed by Vasile Goldiș. Once Maniu spoke publicly about the round-ups that had weakened the Socialist Party, indicating that these had likely been unconstitutional, Viitorul depicted him as a communist. A similar allegation was stated in Viitorul against the PNR-linked poet Aron Cotruș, who was publicly defended by his peers in Patria.

I. I. C. Brătianu's death in November 1927 saw the country briefly governed by his brother Vintilă, who made hasty attempts to form a governing coalition with the PNR. The death was mourned by all the Romanian newspapers, with Viitorul paying additional homages to him as both a "great democrat" and a "great Romanian"; the opposition groups all agreed not to compete with the new cabinet until January 1928. As he prepared to take over as PNL chairman, Duca encouraged the party and its press to voice support for a Federal Europe, as proposed at the time by Briand. From late 1930, pan-Europeanism was fully embraced by Viitorul and developed into an original Romanian project by one of the newspaper's contributors, Mircea Djuvara. Djuvara's articles were also directed against "revanchism", which he associated with Hungary, Bulgaria, Weimar Germany, the Soviet Union, and Fascist Italy. In Djuvara's version, European integration was to be limited by the preservation of national sovereignty, including in matters of nationalist economic policies.

During the late 1920s uncertainty, there had been new developments in the simmering Hungarian–Romanian conflict: upon the discovery of weapons being illegally trafficked through Szentgotthárd from Italy, Viitorul expressed the belief that Hungary should have been placed under direct supervision by the League of Nations. The paper continued to be managed by Mavrodi, who was also a member of the Romanian Senate. During the same interval, in an effort to probe Italy's attitude regarding Hungary, Nicolae Titulescu, who was serving as Romanian delegate to the League of Nations, visited Rome; Mavrodi was also part of that delegation.

Viitorul stood up to more authoritarian right-wingers by defending parliamentary democracy. One such piece, carried in August 1927, was mocked by Pamfil Șeicaru of Cuvântul. He retorted that the Romanian parliament had no prestige whatsoever, and that the National Liberal parliamentarians offered the most egregious examples of disrespect for the system. The PNL had by then involved itself in the dynastic crisis, which saw Crown Prince Carol sidestepped for the position of Romanian King in favor of his junior son Michael I. In January 1926, Viitorul openly welcomed the conflict's apparent resolution—namely, that Carol be demoted to a private citizen, but entitled to a large personal wealth. Such measures never prevented Carol from conspiring to win back the throne, which he regarded as rightfully his. In May 1928, Viitorul covered these schemes in detail, and congratulated the British state for having expelled from its territory a group of Carlist intriguers—comprising Nicolae and Constantin Lupescu, as well as several others. In July, it published an exposé on Carol's other associate, Barbu Ionescu, whom it described as a habitual con artist—while noting that he had in fact been born as Moritz Iancu Leib.

Conservative arrivals in the 1920s
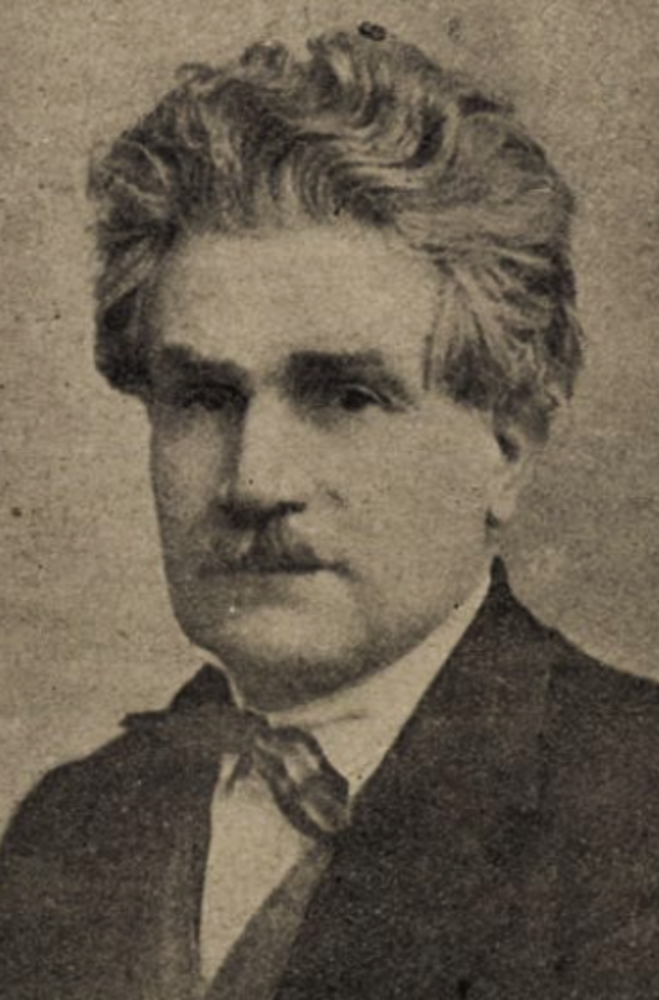
Alexandru Cazaban

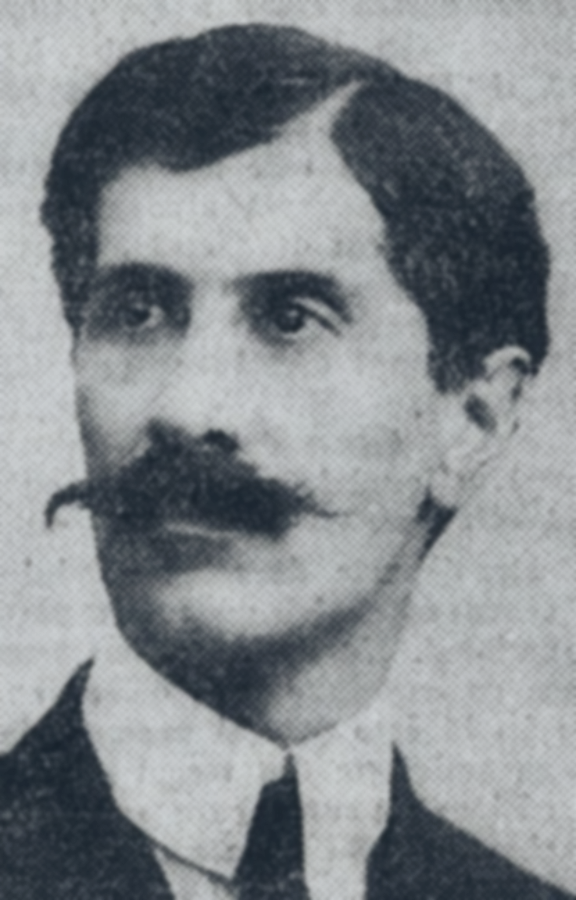
Mircea Djuvara

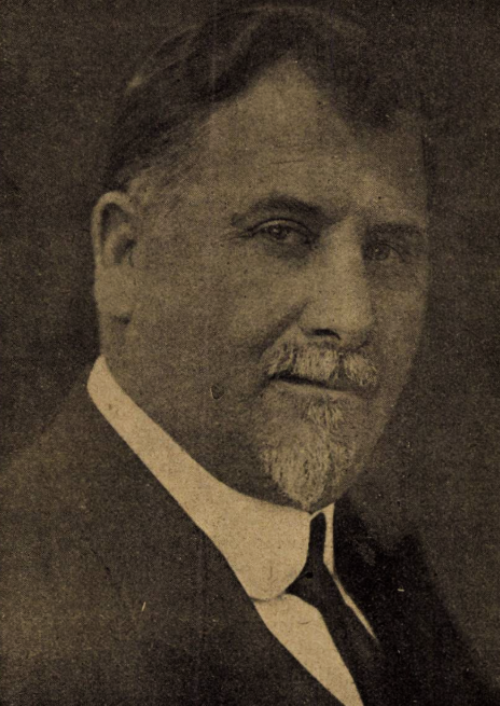
Mihail Dragomirescu

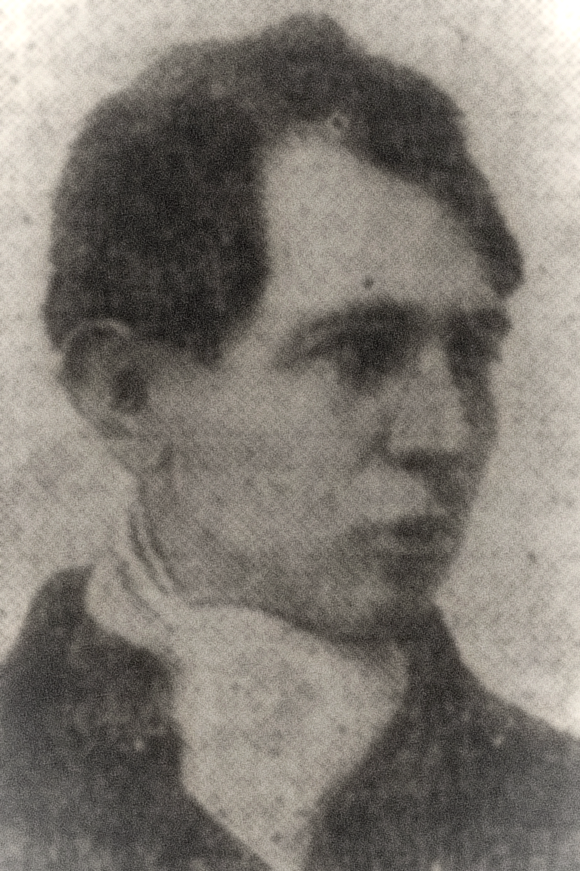
Pompiliu Păltânea

=== Clash with the PNȚ ===
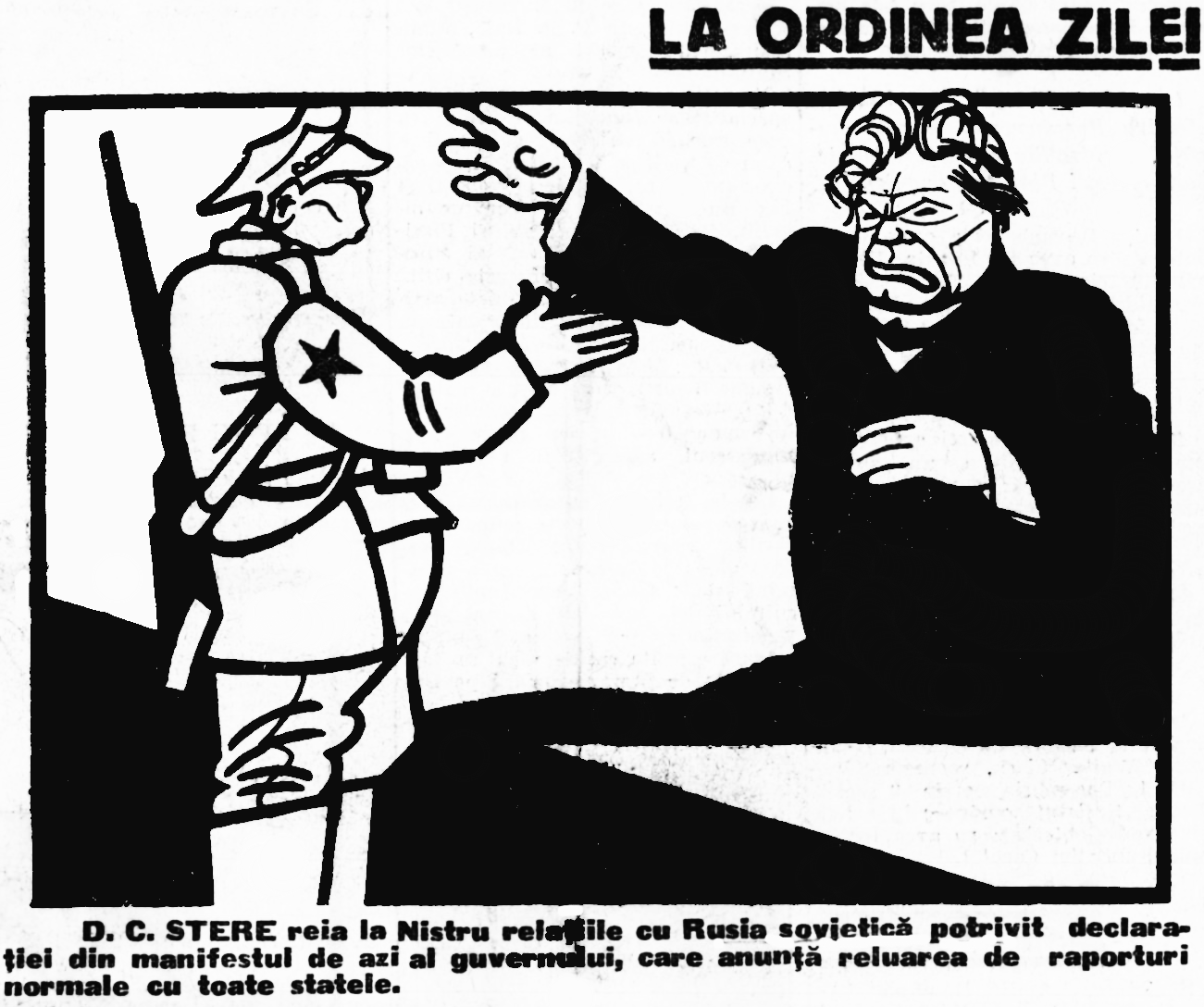
Unsigned editorial cartoon in Viitorul of 1 December 1928, mocking the Maniu cabinet for intending to normalize Romanian–Soviet relations: Constantin Stere on the Dniester, fraternizing with a Soviet border guard

During 1928, a National Peasants' Party (PNȚ), unifying both of the PNL's main rivals, emerged as the leading opposition group, and also as a critic of the regency formed around King Michael. As noted by historian Constantin I. Stan, Viitorul initially tried to present the merger as one in which the PNR had surrendered to the Peasantists; it also deplored their shared platform as prolonging the "politics of negation that has already greatly harmed the effort to organize and consolidate our newly unified Romanian state." The opposition movement was immediately backed by a cross-section of the press, variously including Cuvântul, Adevărul, Curentul, and Dimineața dailies. Viitorul responded with topical articles claiming to expose rival journalists, from Șeicaru to Constantin Graur and Emanoil Socor, as treasonous figures—also alleging that the more left-wing members of this alliance were being subsidized by the Soviets. Ahead of its victory in the general elections in December 1928, the new group held various rallies which illustrated its contempt for the Brătianu family and its political system (which the PNȚ regarded as undemocratic). These events were also covered in detail by Viitorul, which recorded samples from its enemies' speeches, and mocked their political "naivete"; it also expressed worry about the "anarchic" nature of PNȚ messaging, and described the gatherings as carnival-like.

The dispute between the two camps soon became a central focus at Viitorul. In covering a major PNȚ rally, held at Alba Iulia in May 1928, it resorted to sheer satire, claiming that the group had barely managed to reach its attendance goals, and had used various tricks to inflate the numbers. In twin editorials published in March 1928, it accused Dimineața of treasonous activities, and also implied that the PNȚ's Social Democratic allies were being secretly controlled by the outlawed Romanian Communist Party. At the peak of its anti-Carlist campaigns, the newspaper also speculated that the renegade prince was being backed by the Hungarian authorities. It thus raised alarm that Carol was ready to bargain the entirety of Transylvania in exchange for political or military backing, and claimed that PNȚ was similarly inclined. In June 1929, after Hungarian irredentism had been made an official policy by István Bethlen, Viitorul wrote: "Once and for all Hungary should calm down and realise the impossibility of revision, and the futility of her agitation."

Upon ultimately gaining power in the 1928 race, the PNȚ started challenging various of the Brătianus' core policies. By January 1929, Vintilă was especially critical of the policy to purge PNL-ists out of the administrative apparatus. His worries were played down by the PNȚ's Dreptatea, which noted that Viitorul, "evidently written in its entirety by Mr Vintilă Brătianu", alleged that government was both firing clerks and hiring them in unprecedented numbers. In April, Viitorul raised alarm about the conduct of the new Interior Minister, Vaida-Voevod, whom it accused of conspiring together with a "secret association of students". Vaida mocked this claim, responding that the real conspiracy involving him was one "against the Liberals, because [...] I hope to clear up the extremely heavy burden which they have left as heritage." In May, Viitorul issued warnings about the PNȚ's Mihail Cornescu, who had appeared at a public function in Târgoviște to declare his love for Carol. The newspaper extrapolated this incident to declare that the entire PNȚ was being infiltrated by Carlists. However, at exactly the same time, Mavrodi was going against his party by canvassing support for the prince.

The new regime also used the censorship apparatus against its rivals, in an attempt to limit the scope of such campaigns. In May 1930, Maniu, as the PNȚ-appointed Prime Minister, ordered the Gendarmerie to seize all copies of a Viitorul issue, in which Vintilă Brătianu had "scathingly attacked" his policies. Covering this issue at the time, the Chicago Daily Tribune speculated that the episode also had to with Viitorul's "attacks on Prince Carol". As a result, "scores of followers of Bratianu gathered in front of the Viitorul office", engaging in "hand to hand fighting" with the Romanian Police. The authorities' effort was partly thwarted when two paperboys of Romani ethnicity "succeeded in slipping through the police line", and distributed scores of Viitorul copies to the general public.

== Under Carlism ==
=== Carol's return ===
The paradox of censorship was highlighted in June 1929 by French journalist Émile Buré: "the National Peasantist government, which had been elevated by denouncing the liberal party's dictatorship, now had to resort to its own heavy-handed methods. It even enhanced its own tyranny by seizing the newspapers which fought against it with the most rage: Universul and Viitorul." In September, Viitorul hosted an unsigned article which focused on the PNȚ's dealings with "occult" financiers, both internal and international, accused of having blocked Romania's accession to cheap credits, and of having infiltrated the PNL to create warring factions. As noted by the right-wing Curentul, the piece was highly significant, in that it could be read as a message from someone familiar with the PNL's higher-ups. The author was later revealed as Tancred Constantinescu, who supported the "old liberal" mainstream, grouped around Vintilă Brătianu, against Duca and his supporters. The article thus exposed a conflict that risked tearing the PNL apart.

In June 1930, at the peak of political disputes, Carol returned unexpectedly, deposed Michael, and took over as king—his arrival welcomed by Buré as a solution to the PNȚ-ist incompetence. At the time, Viitorul was reportedly selling more copies than ever before, with its printing press guarded by "former ministers and old generals who belong to the liberal party", with Vintilă Brătianu "fashioned into the champion of press freedom." The paper did not welcome Carol, and instead published notes from the PNL's conference—including one by Duca, who called the coup "a most dangerous adventure". For a while, the monarch relied on the PNȚ to form government. At that stage, Viitorul gave some endorsement to the agrarianist majority, since it also supported European integration—the consensus was expressed in sociological articles by Mitiță Constantinescu and Dimitrie Drăghicescu. The latter's contributions also linked pro-European stances with anti-communism, observing that a consolidated European bloc would have cancelled out the Soviet policy of predatory pricing in agriculture.

Vintilă Brătianu died suddenly, in December 1930—leaving his Viitorul colleagues to report that he had also contributed historical essays in their paper, using signatures such as "Brateș" and "Dela Cungra". Carol ultimately selected Nicolae Iorga, of the Democratic Nationalists, to serve as prime minister. When elections were convened in June 1931, the PNȚ openly accused Carol of overextending his powers and interfering with democracy; instead, Duca and Viitorul declared their loyalty to the crown, and "accus[ed] the opposition of fomenting all sorts of attacks against the sovereign." They also gave much support to Iorga's program of debt relief for the smallholders, but, as the PNȚ journals noted, only because doing so would have increased the PNL's own popularity. Through the staff economist Victor Slăvescu, Viitorul also approved of Iorga's policy in regard to military pensions, producing evidence the system had been abused, and was a burden on the state budget.

As relations between the PNL and Iorga's government soured, the newspaper commented with satisfaction on Iorga's unpopularity. In March 1932, after the Prime Minister had publicized his proposals for reestablishing Romania as a corporate state, Viitorul observed that Iorga had been voted out by "his own corporation", the University of Bucharest, when his peers did not want him as their rector. During the elections of July, Viitorul was more appreciative of corporatism, noting that Iorga (who had lost the election overall) had had a strong support from the network of guilds. Codreanu's own fascist movement, called Iron Guard, had a noted ascent during the election, and was therefore viewed with alarm by Viitorul. Its articles on the issue were in turn derided by the Guardist intellectual, Dragoș Protopopescu, who observed that Viitorul had indicted non-crimes, such as Guardists' habit of "riding around the country on horseback".

Carol appointed Vaida-Voevod as prime minister in early 1933, having decided to keep the fascist opposition in check. In that context, Viitorul expressed doubts that Vaida was an actual enemy of the Guardists, exposing government for encouraging them, as well as for turning a blind eye to the spread of Nazism among the Transylvanian Saxons. In November, Duca, already the PNL's chairman, was appointed prime minister, with Carol assuming that his would be a subservient, monarchist, cabinet. Mainline monarchists such as Goga rejected this arrangement, as did the Iron Guard, who emerged as Duca's main enemy. Before general elections in December, Viitorul claimed that the Guard was largely composed of former communists, and that "the far-right is not at all different from Bolshevism." It also censured the Guardists as agents of terror, in preparation for Duca's decision to outlaw the group altogether; on 29 December, Duca was assassinated by a Guardist death squad.

=== Tătărescu's rise ===
The king subsequently cooperated with a PNL faction headed by Gheorghe Tătărescu, who also controlled the editorial line at Viitorul. Political diarist Constantin Argetoianu, of the rival Agrarian Union Party, alleges that, upon inaugurating his first cabinet in January 1934, Tătărescu had accelerated embezzlement and graft, which also benefited the paper: "Viitorul had a 17-million debt in credits at the Românească Bank. Today, they have built themselves their own headquarters on Academiei Street." Directed by Nicolae Maxim and putting out some 20,000 copies per issue (precisely 27,000 in 1934), Viitorul was now conventional in its outlook, and shunned its modernist roots. In 1936, its literary editor was Nicolae Mihăescu, whose attacks on the Romanian avant-garde were admiringly quoted by Iorga. In November 1936, the PNL organ took control of a small literary magazine, Păreri Libere, but it only put out one issue under its management. Viitorul itself hosted short stories by Alexandru Cazaban, regular theatrical chronicles by Ion Foti (now usually known as "Simeon Rufu") and Paul I. Prodan, with additional book reviews by Ion Filotti Cantacuzino and Grigore Tăușan. It lost Mavrodi, who died suddenly in September 1934—and was mourned after by Carol himself.

Tătărescu's rise was censured by figures on the Assembly's right-wing caucus—including Goga, who created national controversy by suggesting that Duca would not have been assassinated at all, had he left the Guard organize in peace. Viitorul replied on 4 March, noting that such leniency could was made impossible by the Guard's own violent antisemitism, adding: "Our party abhors racial hatred and persecutions." Under Tătărescu, the PNL and its press eventually adhered to the newer slogans of Romanian nationalism—including positive discrimination in favor of Romanians, and an implicit Jewish quota in education. As early as January 1934, the paper assured its readers that the cabinet was ensuring the "protection of intellectuals" by introducing ethnic representation among the technical personnel in the various branches of industry. The claim was mocked by the left-wingers at Facla, who argued that such palliatives ignored the material constrains affecting the underemployed youth. On 9 March 1935, Viitorul announced that it did not regard positive discrimination, which was being popularized by Vaida's Romanian Front, as "chauvinistic" or unfair; instead, it observed that Romania's ethnic minorities had obtained over-representation in public affairs through "weapons that are both illegal and dishonest."

Tătărescu's maneuvering was resisted from within the PNL by Dinu Brătianu, who consolidated his own faction—in May 1936, Viitorul published news that Tătărescu and Carol had agreed to share power with Brătianu, but (as Argetoianu argues) only in vague terms that had to be clarified by a more in-depth report in Universul. Brătianu also curbed Tătărescu's attempts to strike out an agreement with the Iron Guard. As a result of this change of course, on 15 May Viitorul hosted an article condemning fascism as the enemy from within, also proposing that PNL men be given lectures about the Guardist peril, and learn to disassociate from it. The following month, Viitorul sided with the left-wing press in condemning the Guardists and other far-right men, who had pelted with stones the Social Democrats' central offices in Bucharest.

In mid-September, having been forced to debunk reports that Austrian Jews were seeking refuge in Romania, Viitorul claimed that the agents of "fake nationalism" wanted to destabilize the country with such disinformation, as a path toward its takeover. Late that month, it also discussed the recent death of its longtime adversary, Stere: "This gifted man of culture and of democratic inclinations could not live up to his promise, to what could have been under more auspicious circumstances and had he not made the same mistakes." In February 1937, rumors circulated according to which the Iron Guard had managed to defy government by raiding the Viitorul offices, where they then beat up PNL youths mounting a defensive action. The following month, Viitorul voiced explicit criticism of Nazi Germany and its policy of rearmament, but calmly argued that a "wall of States that wish to preserve civilization" still existed, to counter this threat. In July, it criticized both sides of the Spanish Civil War, suggesting that "extremists", both on the left and on the right, needed to be kept out of power.

1930s contributors
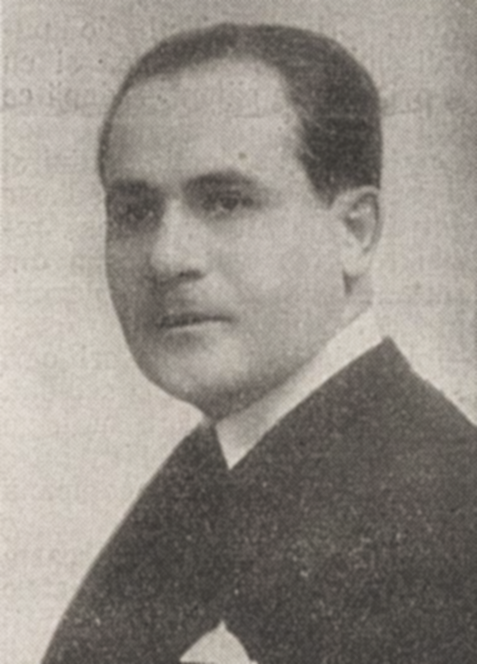
Mitiță Constantinescu

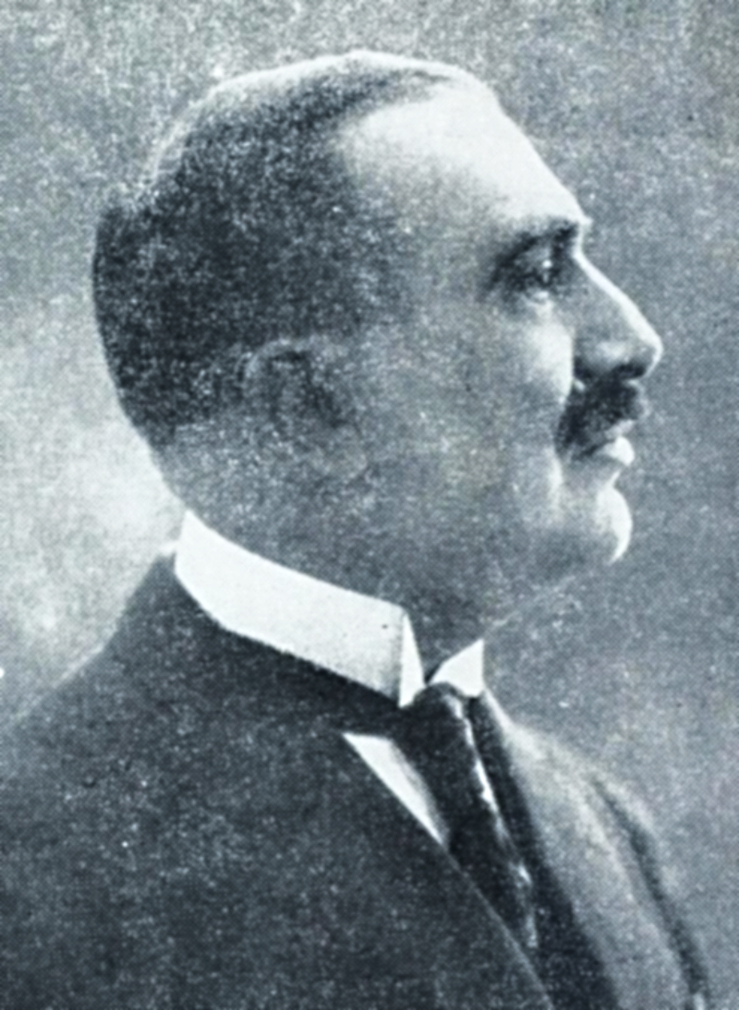
Tancred Constantinescu

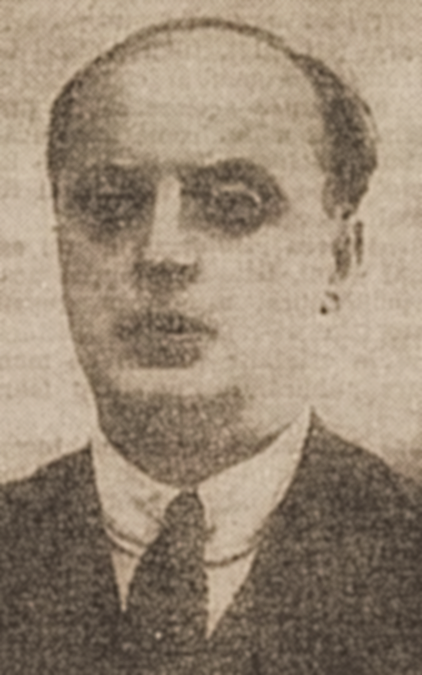
Ion Foti

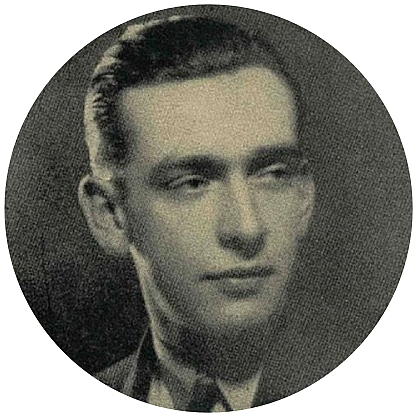
Ion Filotti Cantacuzino

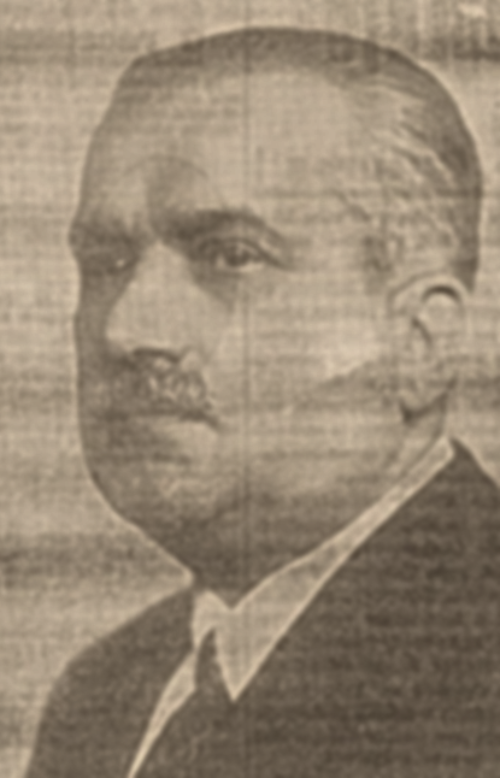
Nicolae Maxim

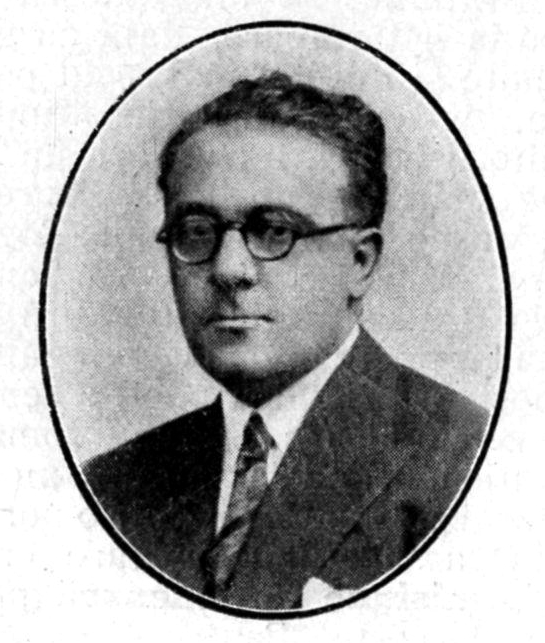
Victor Slăvescu

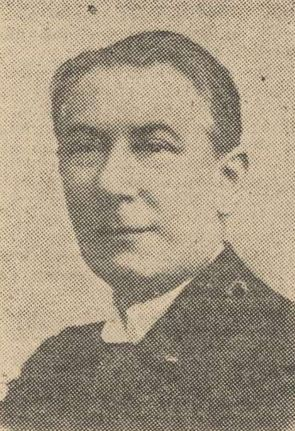
Grigore Tăușan

=== 1937 election ===
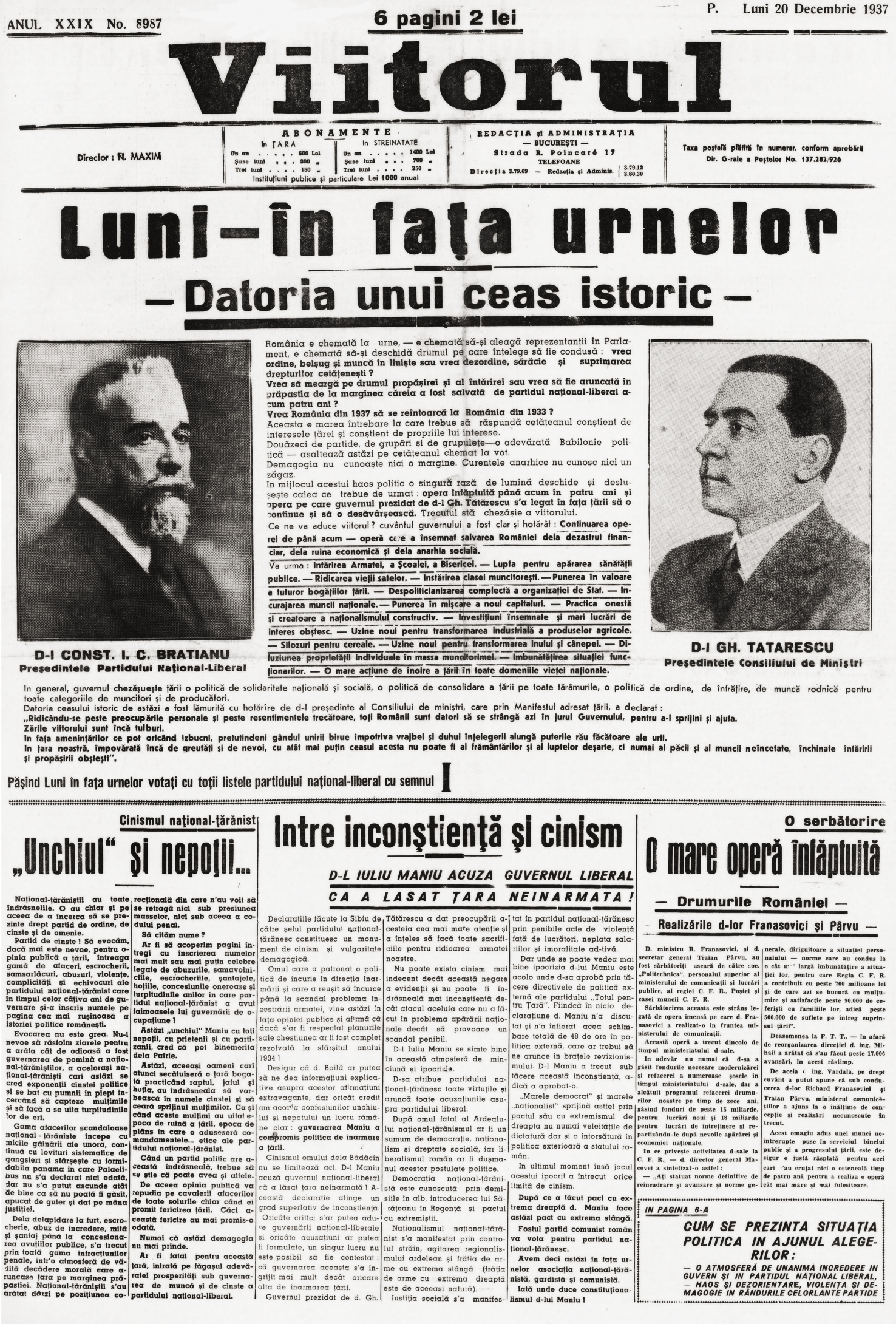
Front page of Viitorul on 20 December 1937, ahead of the general elections (announced as the "duty of an historic hour"); with portraits of factional leaders Dinu Brătianu and Gheorghe Tătărescu

Also in July 1937, Viitorul warned the Ministry of Justice that it needed to ensure complete freedom of choice, in particular by preventing voter intimidation during the elections for lawyers' collages. This stance was applauded in the left-leaning daily Lumea Românească as a departure from the PNL's usual apprach, which had relied on "bullies" (ciomăgari) to influence the vote at all levels; the same paper observed that the proposal was implicitly directed at "right-wing currents", the very same ones that had been cultivated by the PNL. Viitorul nonetheless expressed some sympathy toward the Anti-Comintern Pact, with its rapprochement between Germany and Fascist Italy. In September 1937, it interpreted the joint statements issued in Berlin by Benito Mussolini and Adolf Hitler as having a "peaceful foundation", and claimed that Hitlerian directives needed to be embraced by Europe in its entirety. A column it published that same month seemingly agreed with the far-right that "intruders of dubious origins" needed to be segregated out of Romanian culture. Reporting on this, Porunca Vremii's I. P. Prundeni argued that the staff writers were having a rare show of independence, by trying to "rid themselves from the strictures of treasonous liberalism".

In late 1937, Viitorul involved itself in campaigning for interwar Romania's last free elections. In this context, it promised that the new administration would seek to uproot the political machines that functioned at a provincial level, and also that it would continue to pacify Romania. Reflecting a generic trend in PNL propaganda, Maxim published only a handful of portraits showing either Tătărescu or Brătianu, preferring instead to focus on personal attacks aimed at Maniu. After the election, Carol appointed a minority cabinet under the PNL's rival Goga, staffed by the antisemitic National Christian Party. Immediately after taking office, Goga proceeded to investigate the Jewish-owned Adevărul, claiming to have uncovered financial links between that paper and the PNL; these were denied by Viitorul.

Adevărul was banned days after, but a newspaper named Semnalul came to replace it. As noted by Argetoianu, it was staffed by journalists who also worked at Viitorul, thereby evidencing that Goga was right on this issue. Goga also looked into dissolving Parliament before it could convene, with both the PNL and the PNȚ opining, through their respective organs, that doing so would be unconstitutional. Viitorul still carried messages from the party, approving the participation of several party men, including Tătărescu, on the national unity government formed by Miron Cristea. As it explained at the time, this reflected the liberals' traditional commitment to the "primacy of national salvation" over any ideological squabbles.

In October 1937, Viitorul reproduced Tătărescu's speech at Oradia Mare, which he called "a city with a significant minority population". The Prime Minister was promising "to strengthen relations of normal cooperation and mutual trust with minorities", and, according to Viitorul, implicitly promised "a political détente with Hungary." Still preparing for future elections, the paper announced that it regarded the Iron Guard as a danger for the country—prompting the Carlist Argetoianu to observe that it had not ever done so while the PNL was in power. Also then, it interviewed Brătianu about the Guard and its opposition to Carlism. He declared that the Guard was dangerously radical and had an "inane" economic program. He also noted that the Guardist ideas about joining the Axis powers were especially troubling, by exposing the country to Hungarian irredentism, and also by ruining the "good relations" that had been cultivated with the Soviets; as a result of such policies, he argued, Romania would be turned into a theater of any future war. Such positioning was censured in Germany, with the Hamburger Fremdenblatt complaining that Viitorul spoke for Cristea. It also regarded Viitorul as "chauvinistic" in its anti-Germanism.

=== 1938 dissolution ===
Eventually, Carol decided to topple the democratic regime altogether. For a while, the newspaper survived the adoption of a Carlist constitution in late February 1938. In April, the regime issued a decree outlawing all political parties, but, as Argetoianu notes, it "did nothing to perturb party life", either for the PNL or the PNȚ. Simply ignoring the decree, the Tătărescu and Brătianu wings proceeded with a full schism, each claiming to represent the true PNL; on 5 April, the "old liberals" had Tătărescu's men expelled from Viitorul (sacking almost the entirety of its staff) and from the party club. On that day, Brătianu issued statements condemning Cristea, and noting that Viitorul had been forced to publish "disapproval of our own politics" (the statement itself could not hope to pass censorship, and was therefore circulated by the PNL as a leaflet).

Carol also ordered a thorough investigation of the Iron Guard, now accused of having conspired to make Romania into a German vassal. The central piece of evidence was an old letter that Codreanu had sent to Mihai Stelescu, asserting that "only two hundred tombs" needed to be filled for the Guard to register its ultimate victory. In reviewing this document, Viitorul asserted that: "Never in our history has there even been a similar conspiracy fashioned by Romanians." It also argued that the revelations seemed to have vindicated Duca, assassinated for having caught up with an international plot. At this stage, Romania came to be targeted by territorial ambitions stated by her neighbors, especially including German-backed Hungary and the Soviet Union. During June 1938, Viitorul interpteted the mounting Nazi pressures on Czechoslovakia as a warning for Romania, and for all other countries that stood in Germany's way. It demanded a unity of concept between Western and Eastern Europe, when it came to addressing expansionism. During August, it welcomed the Bled agreement between the Little Entente and Hungary, which lifted some sanctions on the latter's rearmament. It expressed the hope that Hungary was thus compelled to quit the "circle of powers that are likely to generate an armed conflict in Central Europe".

In November 1938, possibly at Tătărescu's behest, Viitorul hosted claims about the number of Romanians still living outside the Greater Romanian borders—as observed by Yugoslavia's Jovan Dučić, the implication was that Carol could have mounted his own irredentist campaign, but that he simply chose not to. On 27 November, it celebrated as officialdom, including Cristea himself, unveiled Ivan Meštrović's monument to I. I. C. Brătianu. It reproduced the speech of a government representative, Gheorghe Ionescu-Sisești, which described Brătianu the elder as a "one of the greatest statesmen to have been produced by our nation's ethnic genius". The newspaper was finally closed down within a month after this event, with the final issue of its second series appearing on 20 December 1938. As explained therein, it could no longer function after the PNL's assets had been confiscated, with Carol's National Renaissance Front established as a sole legal party. Later accounts report that Viitorul continued to be published, illegally, by Tătărescu, who sold copies of it on Calea Victoriei after its disestablishment.

== 1944–1946 revivals ==
=== August coup ===
During the 1940s hiatus, Romania was ruled as an Axis-aligned dictatorship by Ion Antonescu, and sent troops on the Eastern Front. On 23 August 1944, an anti-fascist coup brought the country on the Allied side—but also under a Soviet occupation, giving momentum to the Romanian Communist Party (PCR). The newspaper's third and final series came out on 27 or 28 August. Published by Mihail Fărcășanu (a 36-year old economist who had been president of the PNL youth since 1940), it immediately had to contain the schism produced within the PNL. This opposed the conservative core, surviving around Dinu Brătianu, to the more left-wing Tătărescu, who had now aligned himself with the communists. Fărcășanu and his staff sided with the former group, publishing its appeal to the nation; the dissident group, meanwhile, declared independence as the National Liberal Party–Tătărescu, or PNL–T. From the earliest issues of 1944, Viitorul highlighted Tătărescu's responsibility for Romania's disastrous dictatorships, depicting him as a pillar of Carlism. Fărcășanu was discarding his own extremist sympathies—earlier that decade, as a disciple of Carl Schmitt, he had expressed admiration for Italian fascism. In September 1944, though he overall rejected class-based politics, he proudly accepted the PNL's labeling as "bourgeois party" by the PCR, describing the "Romanian bourgeoisie" as a backbone of the nation-state. His aide at Viitorul was the novelist Gheorghe V. Bumbești, who had formerly published in the Iron Guard's Sfarmă-Piatră.

Shortly after being reissued in this form, Viitorul began advocating for a mass purge of the bureaucratic apparatus, to remove "dictatorial agents" from their posts (in this, it was agreeing with both the PCR and the PNȚ). Around that time, Viitorul and the PNȚ's Dreptatea were being put out from the former offices of Curentul newspaper, which had been owned by Antonescu supporter Pamfil Șeicaru (who had since exiled himself). The building was leased by a PNȚ man, Virgil Solomon, but only to 20 September—when the Red Army took hold of the site as spoils of war, and used it to print the PCR newspaper, Scînteia. By December, Viitorul had moved to No 17 Academiei Street (then known as Poincaré Street), where it ran a collection to benefit Romanian recruits fighting alongside the Soviets.

On 23 September 1944, Scînteia openly accused Viitorul of featuring calumnies against the Soviet state, after its rival had hosted an article by Gheorghe I. Brătianu—the latter, branded a "Hitlerite" by the communists, had touched on the issue of Soviet imperialism. Viitorul replied by questioning Scînteia's legitimacy as a voice of the people, and also by reassuring its readers that the PNL had a "loyal and decisive attitude toward Soviet Russia". Viitorul's own criticism of the PCR was rooted in its admiration for the Western bloc—it argued that the multi-party system there had come to be propped up by the various socialist and communist movements, who no longer favored a dictatorship of the proletariat.

The PNL paper now called for a full rapprochement between Romania and the United States, though also noting that Romania had "political and spiritual obligations" toward the Soviet Union. Therefore, all future Romanian regimes needed to be "compatible with [Russia's] major interests", without however acting as Soviet vassals. Its pages quoted at length from Winston Churchill, and in particular his musings about the possible reemergence of totalitarianism in Eastern Europe (read by historian Victor Boghean as near-explicit warnings about the local communists and their tactics). On 14 October, the PNȚ and the PNL organized a civil march "for the preservation of democracy", with one stop made in front of the Viitorul offices, where Fărcășanu himself gave a speech.

=== Communist sabotage ===
According to records kept by the Siguranța detectives, by 30 September the PNL was already mustering its energies toward preserving Viitorul, which was being widely unread by the Romanian public. In October, it featured Fărcășanu's musings about the need for a political rejuvenation, which the rival journalists at Fapta interpreted as a public critique of Dinu Brătianu. Fărcășanu stood by the party leadership when, the following month, they rejected the formation of a "Democratic Front" alongside the PCR. As reported in Semnalul, Viitorul's articles on the issue, rendering the PNL's overall attitude "in decisive and precise words", fed lively debates among the politicians of the day. Some days later, Viitorul optimistically reported that a "psychological detente" had been reached between communist and non-communists members of the second Sănătescu cabinet.

Although contextually important as "the most important liberal publication", Viitorul had difficulty keeping up with Tătărescu's Drapelul, particularly since the latter was also engaged in appropriating PNL symbols. In December 1944, the two organs competed in publishing commemorative articles about Duca and his 1933 assassination. In this final avatar, Viitorul's cultural editor was the art and film critic Eugen Schileru, who did not otherwise share the PNL's agenda—he had probably joined the PCR during its repression in the 1930s. The newspaper's cultural page was joined by its old contributor Cazaban, as well as by Radu Stanca, Traian Păunescu-Ulmu, and Ion Zamfirescu. Viitorul was at the time serializing Ernest Hemingway's For Whom the Bell Tolls—an initiative which was criticized by the communist Alexandru Graur, who suspected that Hemingway was likely a "Hitlerite, dressed up as a defender of democracy."

The newspaper supported projects for an extensive land reform, as advanced by the PCR, but suggested that the reform itself needed to be postponed until the war's end. The PNȚ sided with the PCR on this issue, sparking an unusual polemic between the two non-communist parties, that was being aired by Viitorul during early February 1945. In this context, Viitorul began putting out a page for the peasantry. The effort was mocked by Petru Groza and his communist-backed Ploughmen's Front; in their reading, the PNL was desperately trying to save face by acknowledging the scale of rural poverty.

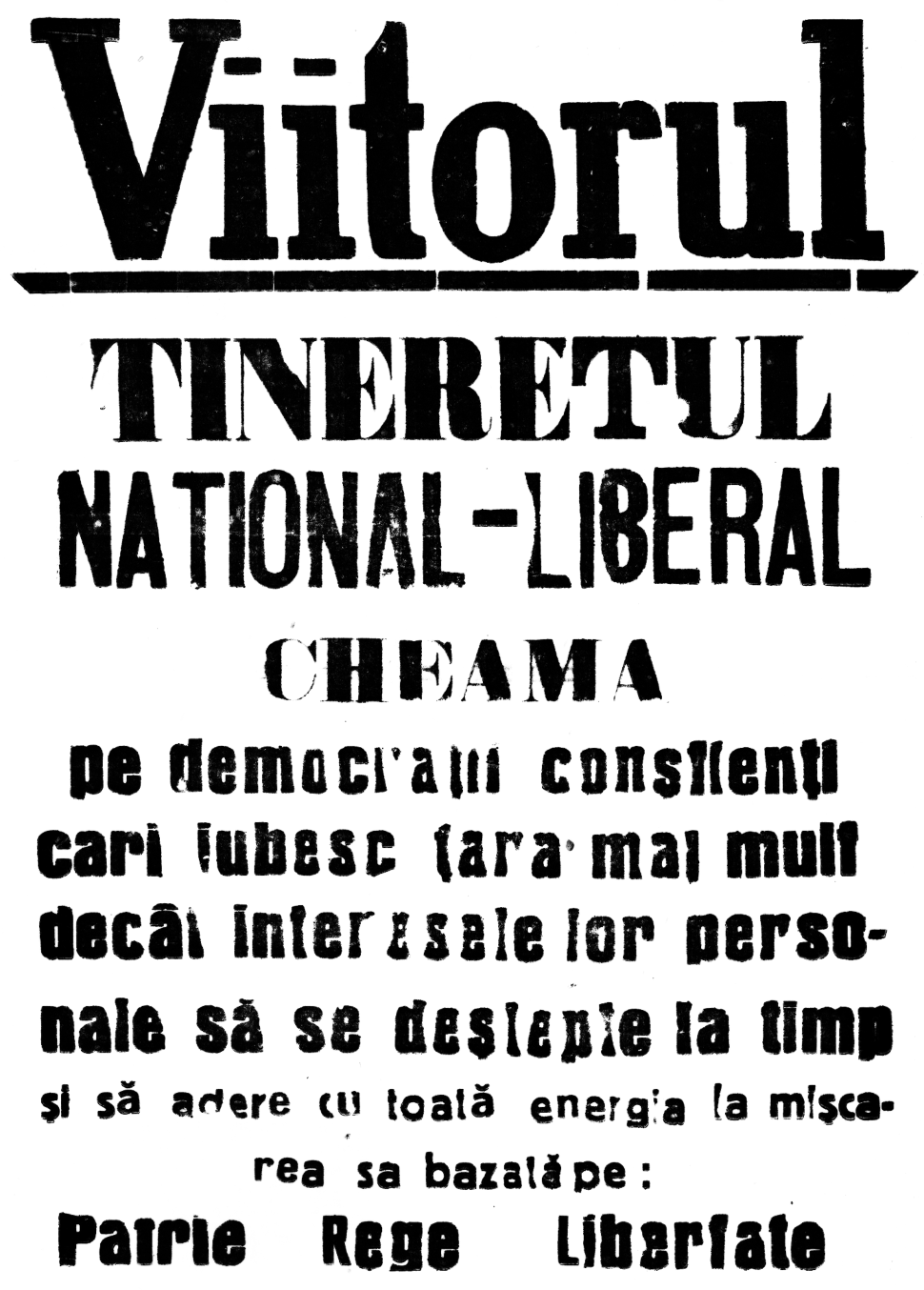
Full-page appeal to Romania's "conscious democrats" in support of "Country, King, Liberty"; penned by the PNL youth for Viitorul, 17 February 1945

General Nicolae Rădescu, who presided upon a short-lived cabinet that still allowed representation to the anti-communists, personally intervened to defend Viitorul against a boycott by leftist typesetters. As reported in Scînteia, the workers had refused to print articles produced by "the liberal party's most reactionary elements", upon which "that hooligan Fărcășanu" had sent in strike-breakers, resulting in a scuffle and the injuring of four trade unionists. Rădescu allowed the newspaper to hire its own printers, and sent in troops to make sure that these were protected from bodily harm. Viitorul was overall supportive of the general's efforts to stabilize the country, commending him for having managed to control the diverging factions of his government—though also noting that this political armistice was already fragile. In January 1945, Viitorul's printing press was used by Grigore Malciu for his own magazine Bilete de Papagal, whose actual editor was the old PNL rival, Tudor Arghezi. According to Siguranța reports, Fărcășanu was trying to find a way out of this contract; Bilete was "only purchased by the intellectuals", and was therefore reliant on Malciu's money, "left to him from the time of Antonescu's dictatorship."

=== Final ban ===
Meanwhile, as a special envoy of the newspaper, Adriana Georgescu was observing the illegal maneuvers whereby the PCR's leaders, especially Emil Bodnăraș and Lucrețiu Pătrășcanu, established a firm hold on regional prefectures ahead of the final move on Bucharest's main executive bodies. As later revealed by scholar Șerban Rădulescu-Zoner, the newspaper was being sabotaged: communist agents resorted to directly intimidating workers at Independența Printing Press, destroying equipment and sequestering Viitorul's envoy, Teofil Zaharia. A final issue of Viitorul appeared on 17 February "with very poor quality graphics, possibly indicating that it was put out from some impromptu printing shop."

The printers stood their ground, suggesting that "Fărcășanu the fascist" had sought to undermine "break up working-class unity", and also that Rădescu's troops had wanted to terrorize them into compliance. On 18 February, Viitorul was suspended by the Soviet-dominated Allied Commission. This ban came after it had published a telegram with a string of initials, read as an encoded message stirring up dissent. Though the PNL issued formal protests against such interpretations, Cortlandt V.R. Schuyler, who represented the United States within the commission, conceded that the telegram may have been a secret warning of some kind, and that Brătianu himself knew as much.

In March, the PCR made a power-grab by establishing a communist-dominated Groza cabinet. As a result of these incidents, Bilete went down and could not reappear—as alleged by the Siguranța, Arghezi was much disliked by the typesetters "over an article from two years back". Viitorul itself was only reissued in January 1946, when PNL minister Mihail Romaniceanu pleaded with his communist colleagues—also managing to upstage the PNL–T, which asked that the Viitorul brand be assigned to Tătărescu. The newspaper was formally disestablished on 18 February 1946 by Groza's functionaries, who would not renew its publishing license. This forced the PNL to issue another mouthpiece, Liberalul ("The Liberal"). The Ministry of Education proceeded to confiscate Viitorul's patrimonial assets, though the PNL managed to appeal the decision in March.

Blacklisted by the PCR, in 1946 Fărcășanu still managed to publish his Viitorul editorials as a brochure, Scrisori către tineretul român ("Letters to the Romanian Youth"), alongside a prize-winning pseudonymous novel. He fled the rapidly communized country later that year, just short of being sentenced in absentia to a lifetime in the labor camps. As the country became a Soviet-style republic in late 1947, he joined General Rădescu in New York City, establishing there a League of Free Romanians; he was also the inaugural director of a Romanian department on Radio Free Europe. Bumbești escaped in a similar manner, and found employment at Voice of America. Another Viitorul newspaper appeared under Gelu Netea's direction in March 1990, just shortly after the Romanian Revolution of 1989. Claiming to represent a new series of the classic paper, and speaking for the revived National Liberals, it survived only to April 1991; its contributors included Ana Blandiana, Traian T. Coșovei, Marin Sorescu, and Gheorghe Tomozei.

Viitorul's final team
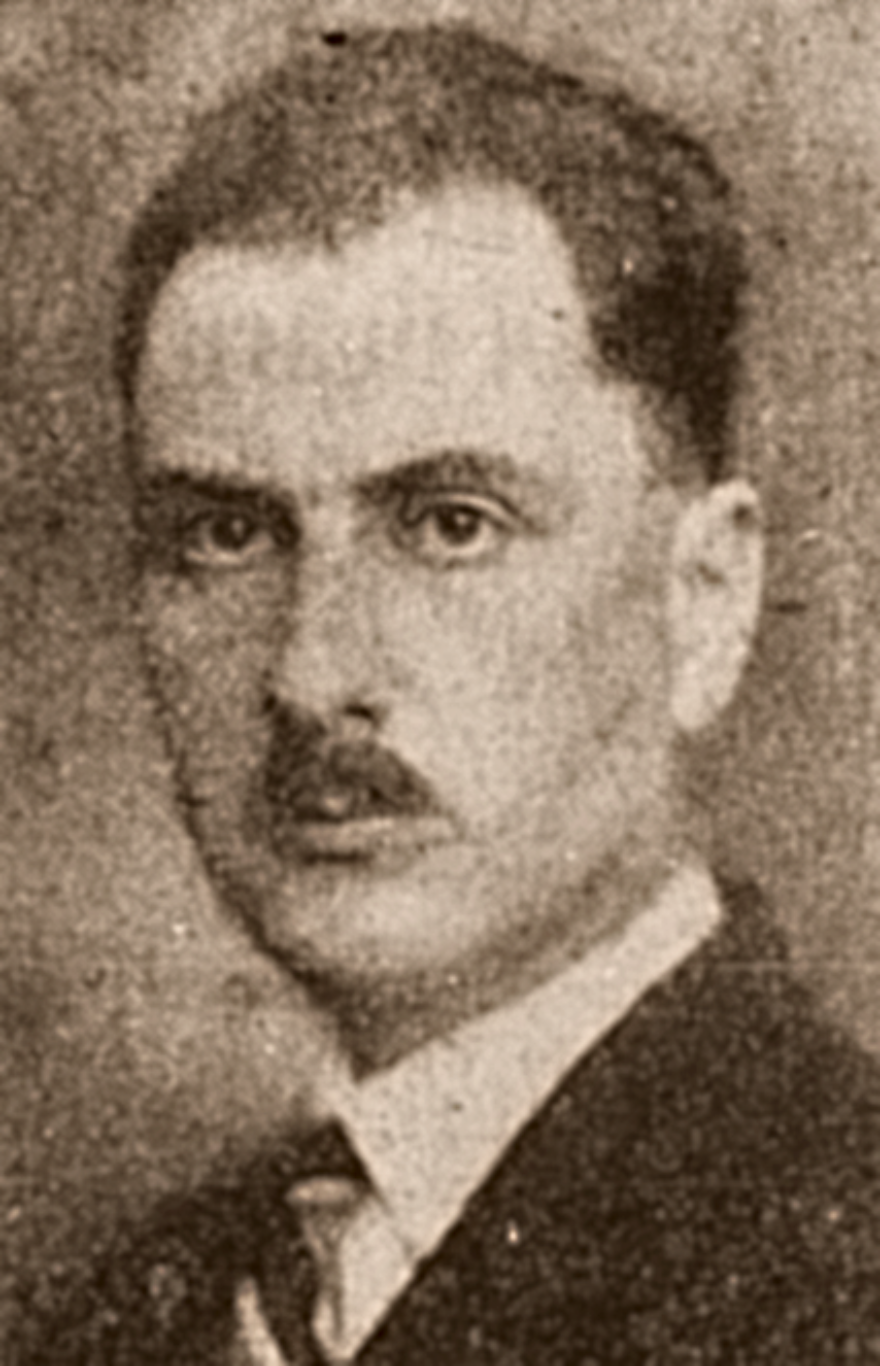
Gheorghe I. Brătianu

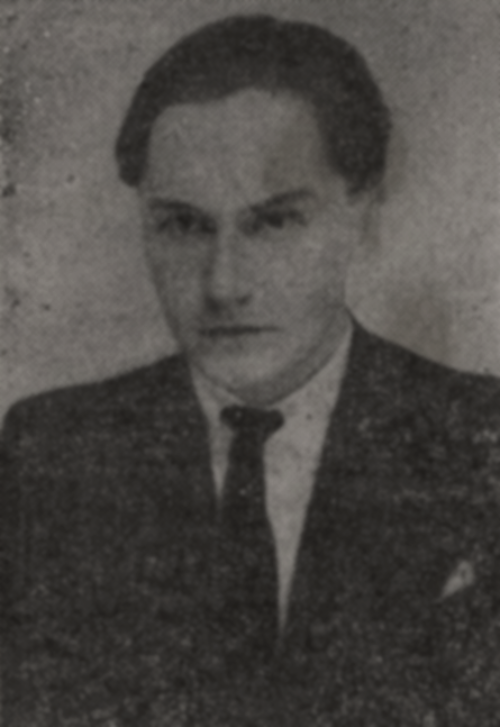
Mihail Fărcășanu

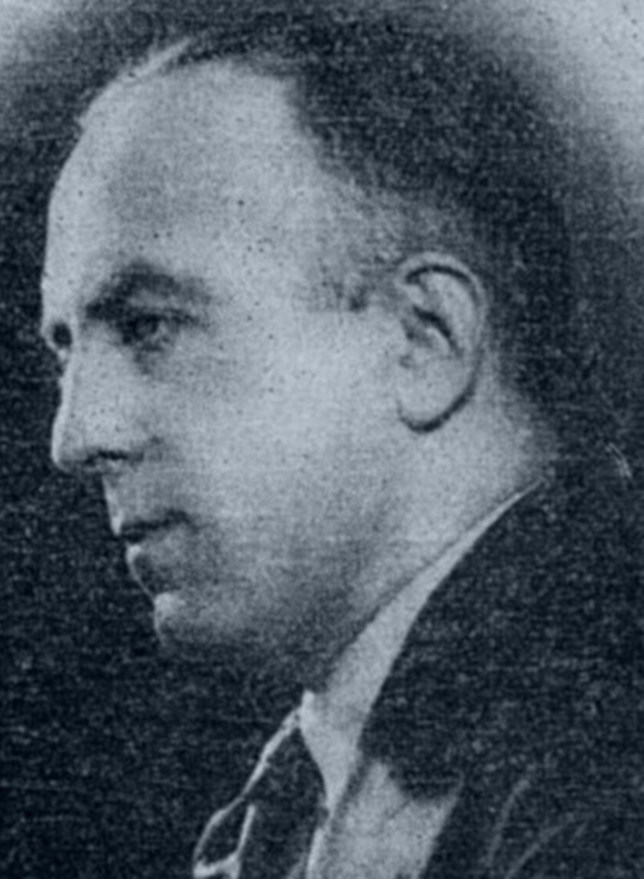
Traian Păunescu-Ulmu

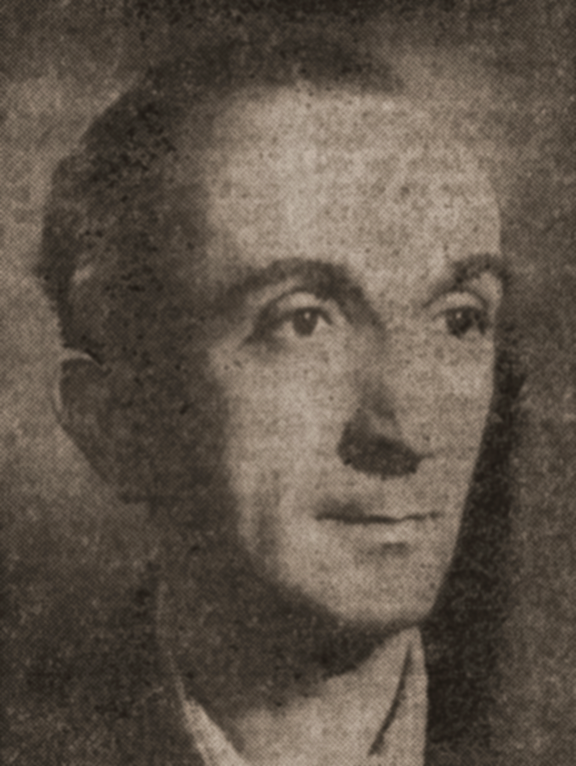
Eugen Schileru

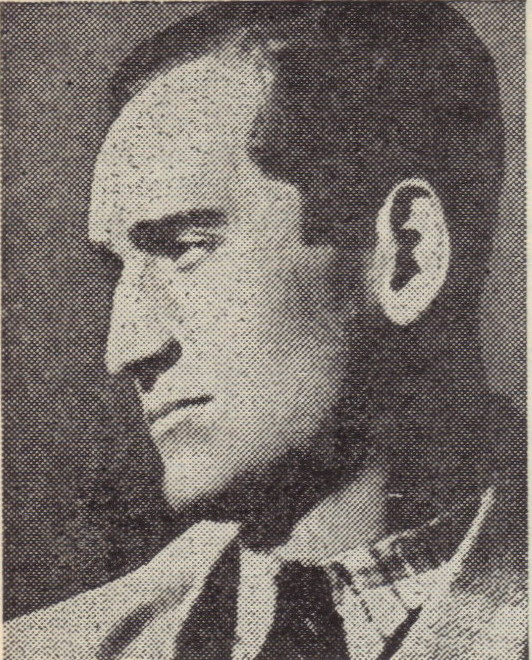
Radu Stanca
