= Grigore Filipescu =

Romanian politician and journalist (1886–1938)

Grigore N. Filipescu
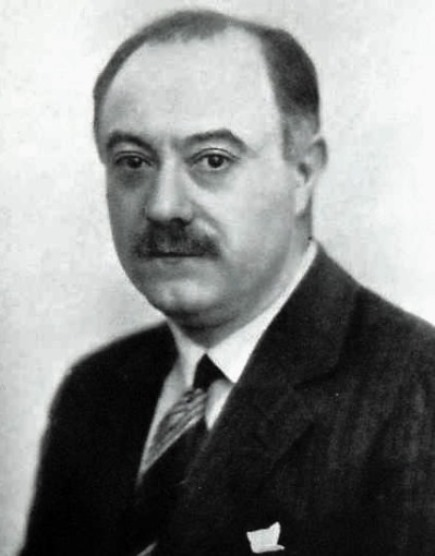
- Filipescu in or around 1936

Leader of the Vlad Țepeș League/Conservative Party
- In office June 1929 – March 1938

President of the Romanian Telephone Company
- In office 1930 – August 25, 1938

Prefect of Ilfov County
- In office May 13 – October 1, 1931
- Preceded by: C. Nicolau (ad interim)
- Succeeded by: Toma Metaxa

Member of the Senate of Romania
- In office October 23, 1932 – December 1937
- Constituency: Vlașca County (1932–1933); Durostor County (1933–1937)

Personal details
- Born: October 1, 1886 Bucharest, Kingdom of Romania
- Died: August 25, 1938 (aged 51) Geneva, Switzerland
- Other political affiliations: Conservative Party (1910s); National Action (1916); Labor Party (1917–1918); People's Party (1918, 1927–1929); Democratic Party (1920); Romanian National Party (1920–1926); National Peasants' Party (1926–1927)
- Spouse: Ioana Cantacuzino
- Relations: Nicolae Filipescu (father); Ion G. Duca (cousin); Dimitrie I. Ghika (cousin); Vladimir Ghika (cousin); Alexandru II Ghica (great-granduncle); Nicolae Moret Blaremberg (granduncle); Matei B. Cantacuzino (father-in-law)
- Profession: Engineer, civil administrator, journalist, businessman
- Nickname: Filipescu-Mătură

Grigore N. Filipescu (also known as Griguță Filipescu, Francized as Grégoire Filipesco; October 1, 1886 – August 25, 1938) was a Romanian politician, journalist and engineer, the chief editor of Epoca daily between 1918 and 1938. He was the scion of an aristocratic conservative family, son of the statesman Nicolae Filipescu and a collateral descendant of Alexandru II Ghica. During the early stages of World War I, he and his father led a pro-Allied dissident wing of the Conservative Party. After serving on the front, and behind the lines to 1918, as aide to General Alexandru Averescu, Filipescu Jr. became his political adviser. He had a stint in the Labor Party, merged into Averescu's own People's Party. Filipescu served as the latter group's tactician and campaigner, but had irreconcilable differences with Averescu.

Known as an antagonist who fought duels with his political rivals, Filipescu switched parties frequently, hoping to coalesce the conservative groups around himself. He served terms in Parliament and held several other public commissions as an affiliate of the Romanian National Party, the Conservative-Democratic Party, and the National Peasants' Party. In 1929, he founded his own Vlad Țepeș League (later branded "Conservative Party"), which was instrumental in ensuring the ascendancy to the throne of King Carol II, the banished heir. The League participated in the coalition backing Prime Minister Nicolae Iorga, but spoke out against Iorga's debt relief legislation. Withdrawing from government, Filipescu remained one of the few politicians who still supported economic liberalism during the Great Depression.

Although suspected of harboring authoritarian tendencies, Filipescu was a public critic of fascism, who supported a continental alliance against Nazi Germany and a pragmatic rapprochement with the Soviet Union. This cause brought him an international reputation, but failed to win him popularity at home. In his final years, before his death from unsuccessful blood transfusion in Geneva, Filipescu stood out as a critic of King Carol, joining efforts with Iuliu Maniu and Nicolae Titulescu. His parallel career as a civil servant and businessman had culminated in his appointment as Romanian Telephone Company president, in which capacity he served from 1930 to the time of his death. This assignment was also marked by scandals involving his confirmed wiretapping of political targets, and also his alleged mismanagement.

== Biography ==
=== Early life and career ===
The future politician native was born in Bucharest on October 1, 1886 (some sources have January 30, 1884). Grigore was the first of five children born to Nicolae Filipescu and his wife Maria Blaremberg; he had a brother, Constantin, and three sisters, as well as an adoptive brother, Vlad Stolojan-Filipescu. He came from an old boyar family on his father's side: the Filipescus had founded the eponymous town Filipeștii de Târg, ca. 1600. His great-grandparents were Hatman Nicolae Filipescu and Safta Hrisoscoleu, who were also the maternal grandparents of Ion G. Duca, Grigore's later rival in politics. His great-granduncle, Alecu Filipescu-Vulpea, had served as Logothete and Ban to the court of Wallachia. On his mother's side, Grigore descended from the Franco–Russian Blarembergs and, collaterally, from the Ghica family. His great-grandfather, Colonel Vladimir de Blaremberg, claimed Huguenot lineage, but was more likely an illegitimate Bourbon. Vladimir had married a sister of Prince Alexandru II Ghica. Their union produced three sons, of whom politician Nicolae Moret Blaremberg was the eldest, and Constantin, Filipescu's grandfather, was the second born. Married to Maria Băleanu, he inherited most of the Ghica estate in Moara Vlăsiei, which later went to the Filipescus. Grigore's cousins on the Ghica side included philanthropist Vladimir Ghika and diplomat Dimitrie I. Ghika, who was briefly Minister of Foreign Affairs.

During Grigore Filipescu's youth, his father was increasing his wealth as an industrialist, establishing an oil mill in his other estate, at Filipești-Surdila. This investment greatly contributed to the spread of sunflower cultivation in eastern Romania. Filipescu Jr grew up conscious of his boyar privilege, arguing that his paternal family "has always known how to love the peasants with all its heart, how to defend and guide them. He pointed out that the first peasant obște in [modern] Romania was formed on his grandfather's estate". He was also quoted as saying that, in the aftermath of a peasants' revolt in early 1907, "the Filipescu estate granted the most well-arranged deals—allowing peasants to keep two thirds [of what they produced]".

After attending primary school in Bucharest, Grigore prepared for middle-school with his father's employee, the writer Alexandru Antemireanu, and was eventually sent to Lycée Louis-le-Grand. In 1902, he enrolled in the Zürich Polytechnic, graduating in 1907. Upon becoming an engineer, he studied at the law faculty of the University of Paris, earning a qualification as a lawyer. During that interval, he had left-wing sympathies, attending events organized by Barbu Lăzăreanu and Christian Rakovsky. He witnessed Rakovsky's disputes with Romanian nationalists, which, as he wrote in 1912, gave him the certainty that socialism would eventually win. In 1909, Filipescu married Ioana (born 1890), daughter of Matei B. Cantacuzino and a representative of the Cantacuzene aristocrats. The couple lived on Nicolae Filipescu Street, in Bucharest, in a house designed by Ion D. Berindey; they had no children. By 1910, the younger Filipescu was also a promoter of sports. This passion ran in the family: Constantin Blaremberg had enjoyed horse racing, and pioneered sports journalism with the newspaper Sportul. Filipescu himself was a great lover of fencing, both as spectator and as participant. In November 1911 he organized the largest athletic event in Romania up to that date, himself taking part in matches. The following year, alongside Crown Prince Carol, Ottokar Czernin, and Alexandru Davila, he took part in the wax bullet dueling competition of Sinaia, designed as marksmanship practice. He was also passionate about horse racing, operating the Filipescu Stables, which won him the Peril Jaune Award at Băneasa Racecourse (October 1915).

While it appears Filipescu never practiced law, as an engineer he worked on several projects, the most important of which was the Câmpina–Constanța petroleum pipeline. In late 1912, he left for New York City, where he studied the American pipeline system. During his trip there, he obtained an interview with former US President Theodore Roosevelt. According to Filipescu, his interlocutor was well versed in Romanian history, could speak some Romanian, and closely followed developments in the ongoing Balkan War. For his merits in building up the local oil industry, Filipescu would later receive the Legion of Honour and the Order of Ferdinand I. At the beginning of his political career, Filipescu belonged to his father's Conservative Party (PC), which competed for power with the National Liberal Party (PNL). Filipescu Jr first rose to prominence during the earliest stages of World War I, when Romania was still a neutral country: in late 1914, he joined a commission headed by Colonel Vasile Rudeanu, which was tasked with negotiating arms deals in Italy, France, and Switzerland.

According to the PNL press, Filipescu was in a conflict of interest for serving as a functionary (in the Ministry of Agriculture and Royal Domains) to August 15, 1915, while also joining the staff of Delaunay House, which operated public contracts at the War Ministry, and serving on the steering board of Marmorosch Blank Bank, which supplied oat for the Romanian Land Forces. A satirical note in Opinia newspaper characterized his tenure as "permanent furlough". Grigore was reportedly incensed by these accusations, as well as by PNL-mounted attacks on his father. On November 4, 1915, his attempt to crash the Bucharest offices of Viitorul newspaper resulted in his being pummeled and lightly injured by his adversaries. Days later, Filipescu pounced upon Viitorul editor M. D. Berlescu, their scuffle ending only when passers-by intervened.

At that stage, the Filipescus supported a Romanian alliance with the Entente nations, whereas the mainstream PC sympathized with the Central Powers; a PNL cabinet, headed by Ion I. C. Brătianu, still preserved neutrality. With his networking between Romania and France, Filipescu had helped his father by denouncing the mainline Conservatives. He focused on Alexandru Marghiloman, who stood accused of plotting to establish a Germanophile cabinet and of consciously undermining France–Romania relations. In a January 1916 interview with Le Journal, Grigore backed Nicolae's "arduous interventionist campaign", expressing regret that Romania had failed to strike the Central Powers in conjunction with the Gallipoli Campaign. However, he noted that the PNL's neutralism had "some arguments in its favor." In April 1916, Grigore and his wife traveled to Lindau in the Kingdom of Bavaria, but were arrested there and expelled from the German Empire; during this incident, Filipescu was reportedly strip-searched. This incident branched into another controversy, when Nicolae Filipescu ran into German Ambassador Hilmar von dem Bussche-Haddenhausen, whom he slapped or at least threatened. As a result, Brătianu was compelled to pay vom dem Bussche a sympathy visit. In June, Filipescu Jr appeared with the pro-Entente "National Action" rally at Dacia Hall, alongside guest speakers Take Ionescu, Ioan Pangal, and Nicolae Titulescu.

=== People's League and Epoca ===
Also in 1916, upon Grigore's intercession, Nicolae merged his faction with Ionescu's Conservative-Democratic Party to form the Conservative-Nationalist Party. Alongside Constantin Argetoianu, Filipescu Jr attended the Ententist gatherings in Sinaia, where, in July 1916, they greeted Charles de Saint-Aulaire as the new French Ambassador. As recounted by Argetoianu, Filipescu sponsored a French actress, Marie-Thérèse Berka, who was also his lover; according to Argetoianu, she was "ugly and a bit past her prime, but intelligent and a good actress." Filipescu also penned a revue that she performed in at Sinaia Casino, on August 5. The elder Filipescu died in October, just as Romania had entered World War I an Entente ally; Grigore received telegrams of condolences from Eleftherios Venizelos and Nikolaos Politis of the Greek government in Thessaloniki, who noted his father's role in ensuring the future "greatness and glory of Romania."

Shortly after, an invasion by the Central Powers prompted the Ententist administration to withdraw into Western Moldavia. Accompanied by Berka, Grigore followed the Romanian administration and saw action on the front, advancing to the rank of Sub-lieutenant, while also joining the Labor Party, formed in 1917 by George Diamandy and other left-wing defectors from the PNL. As later recounted by Ion Anestin, who was his employee, Filipescu presented himself for action with the Chasseurs outside Oituz, at some point after the battle of November 1916. According to Anestin, the local commander ignored Filipescu's request for active duty, and had him dispatched to a behind-the-trenches position, in a makeshift bordei; Filipescu simply got bored, asking (and obtaining) that he be dispatched to Bacău, which was a center of command and of politics.

Around that time, Filipescu identified General Alexandru Averescu, his direct superior, as an ideal leader for a new anti-establishment, anti-PNL, political movement: popular and easily manipulated. According to the hostile recollections of PNL man Gheorghe Gh. Mârzescu, it was Filipescu who organized the torchlight parade of January 1918, in which Averescu was hailed as "tomorrow's government leader". Various Labor Party figures soon drifted toward Averescu's People's League (LP, later "People's Party", or PP), of which Filipescu was a founding member that April. An LP tactician, Filipescu allegedly founded the main party organ, Îndreptarea. He was also credited with having drawn his father-in-law into the League, and to have ensured a state of equilibrium between the Laborites and the far-right circles led by A. C. Cuza.

During that interval, with Conservative-Nationalist backing, Averescu briefly served as Prime Minister of the Romanian rump state, and sued for peace with the Central Powers; this was eventually signed by Averescu's Conservative replacement, Marghiloman. Filipescu was included on the team of negotiators under Take Ionescu, but his presence there was vetoed by the Austro-Hungarian delegation. Posted at Averescu's Bacău headquarters, and was allegedly entrusted with the sanitation department in that city. According to notes kept by Radu R. Rosetti, he "commanded upon a unit of street-sweepers and toilet-cleaners. He was as invested and as cowardly as his father had been courageous." From this period, he earned a derogatory nickname, Filipescu-Mătură ("Filipescu-Broom"). The PNL press also accused Filipescu of being a draft-avoider; Filipescu reacted with a virulent letter to PNL's Duca, his relative. The two dueled with pistols in Iași, but purposefully missed. Filipescu remained an ardent practitioner of dueling (a method he had picked up from his father) and a habitual litigator.

Filipescu was again in Bucharest during the resumption of war and the period leading up to Germany's surrender. His father had founded Epoca newspaper in 1885, and in September 1918, the son decided to revive the moribund outfit, buying the trademark from its nominal owner, Timoleon Pisani. Adversaries from the PNL also speculated that Filipescu was behind another newspaper, Arena, put out in October by a former Germanophile, Alfred Hefter. At Epoca, Filipescu relied on work by various journalists, including Anestin, Pisani, and Mircea Ștefănescu. The latter recalls that, by 1920, the newspaper was nearly bankrupt, relying on handouts from Filipescu's political friends. The enterprise served Filipescu politically: in 1919, it published a dossier on Marghiloman's wartime stances. Filipescu and Argetoianu eventually co-opted two financiers, Aristide Blank and Jean Chrissoveloni. In exchange for backing from the latter two, the newspaper owners were confirmed on the administrative board of Marmorosch Blank, alongside Duca, Toma Stelian, and Alexandru Vaida-Voevod. Blank's involvement would fuel the suspicions of antisemitic groups that the newspaper was a tool of the Jews. While Blank's influence was exaggerated, he did have a say in the editorial policy. For instance, when an article critical of Liviu Rebreanu was slated to appear, the financier convinced Filipescu not to run the story. Such episodes infuriated the writing staff, who reacted to one such case by vandalizing their own editorial office; Filipescu would not fire them, but instead blamed Pisani.

For a while, Filipescu was seen as leading the LP from behind the scenes while Argetoianu was a more public face; both men also tried to co-opt Constantin Stere, but the latter refused. In advance of by-elections scheduled to be held in Moldavia, Filipescu wished to organize agitation, protests and street battles. Reportedly, he also played a part in organizing the general strike on December 25, 1918, approaching Socialist Party militant Ilie Moscovici, with an offer to challenge government censorship. Filipescu also had a rivalry with Titulescu, the Minister of Finance, whom he accused of irresponsibility (allegedly because of direct taxes which harmed Filipescu's private interests) and, later, of extravagance. Averescu objected to Filipescu's rebellious plans, and the latter quit the LP (according to Averescu and Argetoianu's accounts, he was in fact thrown out of the movement by Averescu, who objected to his factionalism; Anestin contrarily argues that he left because of Averescu's talks with Stere). Filipescu, still seen as an "ardent Averescan", tried to negotiate the LP's arrival to power by talking directly to Romania's Queen Marie. In September 1919, it was widely rumored that he and Gheorghe Cantacuzino-Grănicerul were exploring the possibility of forming a Republican Party of Romania.

=== PNR return ===
By early 1920, Filipescu had also renewed his contact with Ionescu, affiliating with the reestablished Conservative-Democratic Party (known then just as the "Democratic Party"), and being included on its executive committee in April 1920. Before the election of May 1920, Filipescu and Ionescu entered the Romanian National Party (PNR), a rising conservative group from Transylvania, as two of its very few affiliates from the "Old Kingdom". Epoca served as Ionescu's mouthpiece; within a few months, as Ionescu took to supporting the PP, Filipescu's paper drew attention with its attacks on the PNR leadership, whom it accused of disloyalty toward Greater Romania. Filipescu then ran as an Averescu favorite in the by-election for the Assembly of Deputies in Maramureș County, which was held in September 1920. He initially lost by over 300 votes to a socialist, Ioan Flueraș, finding himself ridiculed over this in the PNR's own organ, Patria. He was given a chance to take the supplementary seat after ballotage, which he won. According to Patria, he used illegal methods, such as distributing tobacco, which was in short supply, to the inhabitants of Sighetu Marmației, or using government terror against his adversaries.

In December 1921, after Averescu's departure as Prime Minister, Ionescu was charged with forming a new government, and Filipescu, who assured him of having a parliamentary majority, persuaded him to accept. His hope was to form a new party comprising elements of the two conservative parties plus dissidents from the People's Party (PP, as the LP was then known) and the PNR. While Ionescu only lasted a month as premier, he became close to Nicolae Iorga, who won multiple seats in the Assembly. He ceded one of them to Ionescu, who in turn handed it to Filipescu. Following Ionescu's death later in 1922, Filipescu approached Iorga in an attempt to merge with his Democratic Nationalist Party (PND), but negotiations ultimately collapsed. He and Constantin Xeni also tried to convince both Argetoianu and Iorga to re-establish the defunct PC, but personal acrimony between the latter two precluded the plan from fruition.

The inauguration in January of a new PNL cabinet, again headed by Brătianu, consecrated a defeat for the conservative groups in the March elections. During that campaign, Filipescu announced that he was traveling with a revolver; an epigram by Ion Ionescu-Quintus mocked him for having "taken aim at anything but votes". This episode prompted the scattered opposition to begin attempts at fusion. In November 1922, the PNR absorbed the remnants of Ionescu's formation, thus extending its reach into the Old Kingdom. Filipescu was persuaded to do the same, helping with negotiations between the two sides in Dolj County and in Bucharest, where he also sponsored a reconciliation banquet. An anti-Filipescu wing of the Ionescu Conservatives, under Iulian Vrăbiescu, survived and joined the PND, hampering negotiations over a merger between the latter and the PNR. Initially, Filipescu was visibly involved in PNR caucus, having managed to impose on the new party his and Ionescu's pro-Entente, anti-German foreign policy. He spent the period circulating leaks from Mârzescu and other PNL whistle-blowers, who informed him about Brătianu's sale of Romanian passports, and, in the Assembly, initiated a motion of no confidence. In February 1923, he was active in the by-election of Ighiu, denouncing fraud and being chased away at gunpoint by the Gendarmerie.

Filipescu's stances resulted in him being expelled from the Assembly for a ten-day interval, on March 13, 1923, and also collided with the policies of Romanian King, Ferdinand I, who had a preference for Brătianu and the PNL. At a PNR gathering on March 19, Filipescu "reject[ed] the charge of anti-dynastism, but emphasize[ed] that the camarilla present at the [royal] court should be removed". Also that day, he led a group of peasants to the Royal Palace of Bucharest, demanding that the PNL's proposal for a new constitution, whom they called the "Brătianu family constitution", be overturned; they were then chased out by the royal guards' regiment. During the debates over the constitution, he allegedly released hydrogen sulfide into the Assembly hall, which had to be evacuated, due to the unbearable odor. Filipescu and his colleague Vasile Hortopan were also present at a public protest in May, during which they found themselves engaged in a scuffle with Army soldiers. This resulted in their indictment by the public prosecutor in Ilfov County (the charges were finally lifted in June 1925).

The "Ighiu recipe" was again alleged in the March 1924 election at Balș, in Romanați County, when Filipescu had another row with the Gendarmes: while his party colleague Ilie Lazăr was arrested, Filipescu was reportedly threatened and had his tires slashed. Later that year, during local elections at Dej, Filipescu slapped the supervisor, Teodor Herman. The manner fueled much controversy, as Herman was also a priest. This incident endangered the seat he still held in the Assembly, when his colleagues voted to have his immunity removed. Filipescu openly admitted to his deed and asked to be tried by a jury, but also stated that he did not recognize the Assembly's legitimacy, deeming it fraudulent. Eventually, the matter was dropped, as consensus was never reached.

On October 9, 1923, Filipescu had been voted in as honorary president for the PNR section in Dolj. He also sat on a 150-member executive committee and headed the PNR's Bucharest chapter, but did not hold a leading position within the party. He also did not get along very well with the Transylvanian colleagues, a sentiment that deepened in him and other former Ionescu partisans (takiști) when negotiations for a merger with the left-wing Peasants' Party began. Filipescu was an enthusiastic of the unification, as early as 1924—when Opinia mockingly announced that he would celebrate the merger by wearing a peasant shirt. Valeriu Braniște, a political diarist and confidant of the PNR leaders, writes that Iuliu Maniu and Filipescu first clashed when the latter tried to impose Xeni as the party president. Moreover, in December 1923, Filipescu and Iorga had a publicized quarrel, which began when Iorga criticized the late Nicolae Filipescu. The incensed son threatened him with a duel. By 1924, Iorga notes, Filipescu opposed the PNR–PND fusion "for the principle of it".

Epoca had ceased publication in August 1923, but was revived in February 1926. In fact, it was Filipescu's personal newspaper and always mirrored his views. His favorite targets were the royal camarilla, in particular Queen Marie, her lover Barbu Știrbey, D. R. Ioanițescu and, when not allied with him, Maniu. Journalist Calman Blumenfeld-Scrutator argues that the PNR's disregard for Epoca's attacks on Știrbey was disastrous for the party. Often friendly toward Maniu, Știrbey was persuaded to maneuver in favor of Averescu, who unexpectedly became Prime Minister in March 1926. According to a disputed account by socialist leader Constantin Titel Petrescu, in March–April, before the Bucharest Commune, Filipescu presented himself as the head of a "Conservative Group", which signed its own alliance pact with the Peasants' Party and the Social Democratic Party. Newspapers of that period record him as a councilor for the Yellow Sector, one of thirteen elected on the "United Opposition" ticket. The legislative elections of May 1926 saw Filipescu announced as the winner of an Assembly seat in Tutova. Government ordered a recount (described in opposition newspapers as a "trick"), which resulted in his being defeated. During the by-elections of September, which witnessed a steady climb for the PNL, Filipescu himself openly accused Averescu of collusion and fraud.

=== LVȚ and Carlism ===
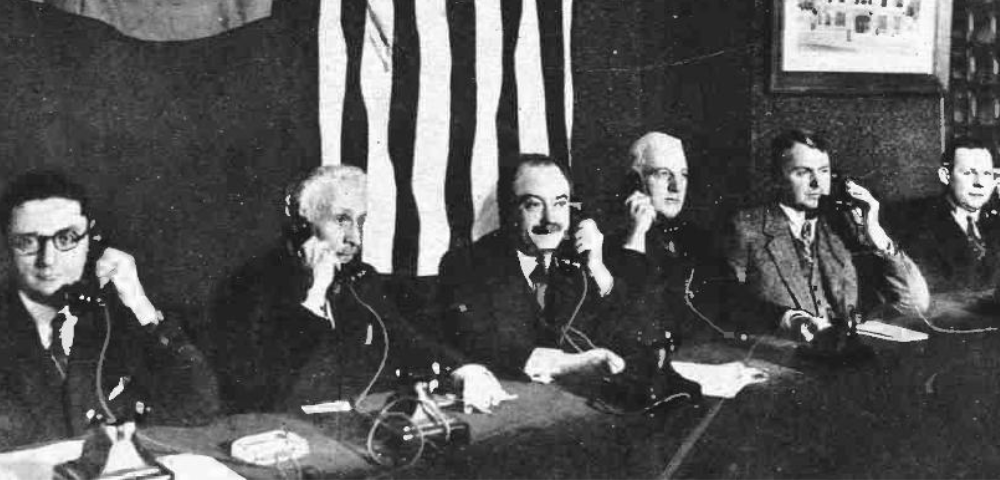
The first-ever call from Bucharest to New York City, on December 25, 1931. Filipescu, as president of the Romanian Telephone Company, is in the middle, with ITT Corporation staff on the right; to his left, ministers Victor Vâlcovici of Public Works and Dimitrie I. Ghika of Foreign Affairs

The merger with the Peasantists did take place in October 1926, giving rise to the National Peasants' Party (PNȚ). Filipescu and other takiști found themselves increasingly isolated, and, in January 1927, dissented from the PNȚ on the issue of collaboration with government forces, to engage in direct talks with Averescu. In April, they defected to the PP. Once reunited with Averescu, Filipescu "was assigned to collect data for a new electoral law. Filipescu is traveling to Paris in the next few days. His instructions are that [...] universal, equal, secret suffrage should be introduced, along with mandatory voting. [This] would make it completely impossible for [the PNL] to get into government though parliamentary methods." Appearing as a defense witness for Boris Stefanov, jailed leader of the Romanian Communist Party, Filipescu decried political repression, and argued that "in today's difficult economic situation, [communists] should be asked to provide their input."

Speaking at a PP rally in Focșani before the campaign of 1928, Filipescu declared himself an enemy of "demagoguery", but also acknowledged that Romania was ripe for democracy; he also denounced the PNL's "dictatorship", and claimed to expose the government's incompetence. He himself ran for Assembly seats, on a shared PP–PND ticket. He was assigned first places on the list for Dâmbovița, and less eligible positions in Caliacra and Ilfov. The bloc won five seats in all, none of which went to Filipescu—in Dâmbovița, all seats were taken by the PNȚ, with Cezar Spineanu as leader. Throughout this period, Filipescu was still focused on attacking Știrbey and the Brătianus. However, he soon found himself at odds with Averescu, who had asked him to be lenient on Știrbey. Instead, together with his followers, Filipescu left the PP for a second and final time, in March 1929.

Filipescu founded the Vlad Țepeș League (LVȚ) in June 1929, amidst a campaign he supported to place Prince Carol, Știrbey's enemy, on the throne. As noted by one of its members, the industrialist Alfred Cerchez, the League had the Carlist agenda for a primary objective. Carol returned triumphantly in June 1930, after a campaign in which Epoca represented the moderate side. Filipescu debated with the more radical Carlist Nae Ionescu, who had been harshly critical of the Romanian Regency regime. In May 1930, Filipescu aired a "controversial matter regarding Prince Carol", which resulted in his newspaper being temporarily banned by Maniu; there followed a scuffle, during which Filipescu had to be restrained by the Romanian Police. Adding to the ambiguities was that Știrbey also supported the returning king, as did Filipescu's German enemies. In late 1930, Filipescu intercepted and published a letter from the German Ambassador Gerhard von Mutius, in which the latter excoriated Epoca and defended Știrbey. Filipescu, who demanded a duel, accused von Mutius of being the agent of German revisionism. Beyond its monarchist agenda, the LVȚ was eclectic and factionalized, including in its ranks national conservatives or fascist sympathizers such as Cantacuzino-Grănicerul and Amos Frâncu. Filipescu's own support for Carlism was read by Western observers as a form of right-wing extremism. Around 1930, he was referred to in the English-speaking media as a "Baby Fascist" or a Romanian replica of Adolf Hitler. However, a keen observer of foreign politics, Filipescu was a frequent critic of Benito Mussolini's Italy, which caused him to decline the post of Foreign Minister.

Reconciling with Titulescu, who supported similar views at the League of Nations, Filipescu became the first president of the Romanian Telephone Company (SART), partly privatized in 1929, serving from 1930 until his death. He also presided over the Tobacco Monopoly and a number of other commercial enterprises. His term at SART saw the purchase of controlling interest by ITT Corporation, then the construction of the Bucharest Telephone Palace, completed in 1933, and back then the tallest building in Romania. This assignment became the focus of additional controversy, with critics noting that, although the company was profitable, and the third-largest ITT subsidiary, services had improved only by a slim margin. He was denounced by the PNȚ's Virgil Madgearu, who audited the Company and found that Filipescu took a monthly salary of 100,000 lei, more than three times what a minister made—and, effectively, a lifeline for Epoca. A nationalist deputy, Leon Scridon, also accused Filipescu of running errands for Hungarian and Jewish entrepreneurs, and publicized alleged proof of mismanagement. For his part, Filipescu noted that the Romanian state was habitually cheating on the company's American shareholders, diverting investments and forcing them to accept redundant employees. From his managerial position, Filipescu also obtained intercepts of calls. This allowed him to spy on behalf of Carol, who consequently protected Filipescu against all backlash.

By April 1931, Filipescu and the LVȚ were backing the Maniu government, being opposed to the dissolution of Parliament—as demanded by the other opposition parties. In return, Filipescu asked and obtained for himself the prefecture of Ilfov. This office was widely seen as beneath his prestige and competence, but he explained that he cold contribute to regional prosperity. He took over on May 13, replacing the ad-interim prefect C. Nicolau. In the legislative election of June, the LVȚ ran as an ally of Iorga's Democratic Nationalists. Again turning his attention to the West, Filipescu repeatedly asked Prime Minister Iorga to make him Ambassador to Switzerland, and also sought high offices for LVȚ figures. Such moves were blocked by Carol, Titulescu, and other members of the establishment. On October 1, 1931, he relinquished his prefecture to a League subordinate, Toma Metaxa. His trip to France, which took place that month, was allegedly a mission assigned by Iorga, who was hoping that Filipescu could talk French newspaper owners into being less critical of his government.

=== Antifascist mainstream ===
At a League congress in November 1931, Filipescu announced that the LVȚ was primarily a replica of Britain's Conservative and Unionist Party, and a direct successor to his father's own Conservative Party. On March 10, 1932, the League became the Conservative Party (PC), with Epoca as its political organ. The group thus withdrew its support for the Iorga cabinet, explicitly rejecting its plan to tackle the Great Depression with debt relief, and defending the core tenets of economic liberalism. Argetoianu, the Minister of Finance, recalled that "ever since the Relief, Epoca has been addressing me Gypsy swearwords." That year, the most famous of Filipescu's duels, covered by newspapers in the United States, Spain and France, involved Gheorghe I. Brătianu, who had insulted Filipescu in print. Mihail R. Sturdza was also challenged, and the plan was to use pistols followed by swords. A bullet hit the latter's pants, while Brătianu and Filipescu made peace. His relations with other politicians were inconsistent: Argetoianu, Titulescu, Maniu and many others veered between being his friends and his enemies.

Filipescu's adamant views on contentious topics contributed to his political alienation. Reportedly, in late 1931, he escaped unharmed after shots were fired at his automobile. By 1932, the PC was losing its support base on the right, with Cantacuzino-Grănicerul and other cadres migrating toward the Iron Guard, an openly fascist movement, or trying to persuade General Ion Antonescu into reviving the Vlad Țepeș League. Filipescu had already taken a stand against far-right violence when, in July 1930, he asked that Gheorghe Beza, a former Epoca reporter who had tried to kill the PNL's Constantin Angelescu, be put to death. That "extreme" approach was criticized at the time by the left-wing paper Adevărul, which also noted that Filipescu had little in the way of practical solutions against fascist agitation.

On October 23, 1932, supported by Maniu and the PNȚ as "government's only candidate", Filipescu won a Senate seat for Vlașca County, taking 147 mayoral votes; his main rival, D. Noica of the Agrarian Union Party, only had 69. He gave a speech on "common sense in politics", presenting his group as Romania's only truthful party, and the only one which addressed the worldwide perils engulfing Romania. Filipescu also continued to exercise an intellectual influence over the political class with his stance on debt and, in 1933, sparked a national debate over the need to restore the country risk to more manageable levels—in practice, a push toward austerity. Throughout 1933, he opposed the new PNȚ government, chaired by Vaida-Voevod, arguing that the PNȚ itself was in reality two parties: a Carlist one, formed around Vaida-Voevod, and a more populist one, under Maniu's guidance (which Filipescu now identified as preferable). He viewed government credit policies as "economic Bolshevism"; with Aurel Vlad, he established an "Anti-Bolshevik Front", which toured Romanian cities to explain why relief was disastrous. On August 7, members of the Front for Urban Debt-clearance stormed into Ramuri hall, Craiova, seeking to prevent Filipescu from stating his case against debt relief.

The PC formed a cartel with the PP during the December 1933 election, but registered dismal results. Filipescu tried out for a deputy seat in Brăila County, but was soundly defeated, assuring public opinion that he would still return. Commenting on these developments, the PND newspaper Neamul Românesc informed him that a return was only possible once voters will have lost their memory of his "sins". The national race was won by the PNL, with Duca being confirmed as Prime Minister. The PC managed to win three senatorial seats, with Filipescu elected in Durostor. In all three precincts, the PNL had withdrawn its candidates, leading the PNȚ's newspapers to claim that Filipescu and Duca had a secret pact. Filipescu also ran, unsuccessfully, for a deputy seat in Ilfov during the by-elections of 1934.

Filipescu was critical of Premier Duca's order to ban the Iron Guard, arguining that the movement was largely harmless, and that its ranks included at least some "enthusiastic, clear-minded youths". In early 1934, Duca's assassination by an Iron Gard death squad signaled a period of uncertainty, and seemed to ensure a pretext for Carol's authoritarianism. By then, Filipescu and Maniu were mainly visible as the sworn enemies of the king, whom they had come to see as an autocratic figure, forcing them into talks about forming the democratic opposition. As early as 1933, rumor spread that they were both turning republican, joining hands with the more radical Nicolae L. Lupu. From his position in the Senate, Filipescu pressured Gheorghe Tătărescu's government to report on its policies after Duca's assassins had been tried and sentenced; this effort was backed by the PNȚ's Grigore Gafencu and Mihail Mora. As Conservative leader, he drafted a strategy against Carol's state of emergency, which had prolonged political censorship, and invited the PP, the PNȚ, the Radical Peasants' Party and the Georgist Liberals to join him in this effort.

In August 1934, Filipescu hosted in Bucharest a grand reception in honor of Maniu. By then, the groups involved had agreed on several demands, including that Carol should renounce his mistress, Elena Lupescu, and that Gavrilă Marinescu be removed from the leadership of the police forces. At the Telephone Palace, Filipescu switched from spying on behalf of the king to intercepting the royal court itself, obtaining information which made its way Maniu and Titulescu. In December 1934, the issue of intercepts erupted into national scandal, with claims that American spies were acting as ITT staff. This rumor prompted Siguranța agents to search the Telephone Palace and Filipescu's home. His subordinates were rounded up by police in August 1935, after allegations that they "had taken advantage of the maze of complicated foreign exchange regulations, or defrauded the company to the tune of 100 million lei." Widely seen as compromised by the affair, Filipescu was again protected by the king.

Throughout those years, Filipescu was frequently in Paris and Geneva, where he gave interviews and wrote for local newspapers. His Francophile sympathies were commented on by 1918, and in March 1935, L'Ouest-Éclair republished an article of his in which Filipescu decried the possibility of an alliance between Romania and Nazi Germany. In December 1935, he visited Berlin and had a meeting with Hermann Göring, who was trying to talk Romania out of a defensive rapprochement with the Soviet Union. At the time, Filipescu was still highly critical of peace with the Soviets: Petre Constantinescu-Iași, of the underground communists and the pro-Soviet Amicii URSS, accused Filipescu of being a "reactionary" enemy of his antifascist initiative. Epoca celebrated when Constantinescu-Iași and other communists were rounded up by police in early 1936, also announcing its support for Ana Pauker's prosecution at Craiova. It drew attention to the non-Romanian origin of most defendants; it also asserted that "communism has folded itself neatly under the label of 'anti-fascism'", like "sleazy dives" pretending to be cultural circles.

=== Final projects ===
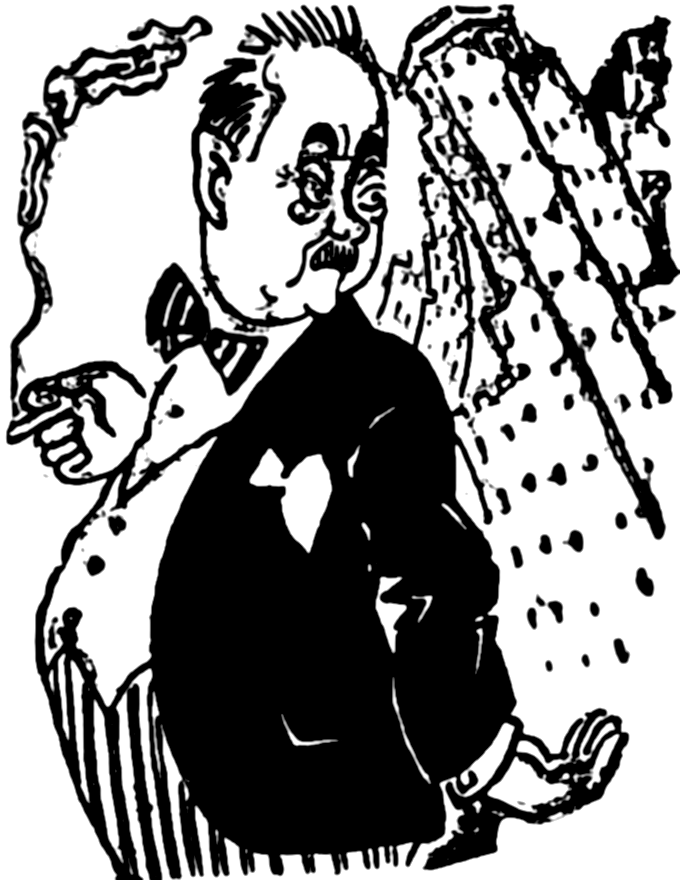
Filipescu as a vector for political corruption. Caricature in the Iron Guard's Buna Vestire daily, August 1937

According to the French journalist Georges Oudard, the PC was a strong defender "of economic and financial orthodoxy against the temptations of a coming world", "head-turning censorship" with Filipescu's "cruel wit". On February 18, 1936, Filipescu reiterated his opposition to Nazism with a public conference in Bucharest's Sala Dalles. This was interrupted by a small group of youths who taunted him with chants of: "Long live Germany! Long live Hitler!" Also in 1936, he joined Lord Cecil's International Peace Campaign, serving as vice president of its chapter, alongside Petru Groza and Constantin Rădulescu-Motru; Titulescu was its president. In that context, Groza underscored that pacifism was also a patriotic duty against Hungarian irredentism; as he put it: "This is all the more true as the pacifist action has enlisted even a conservative such as Grigore Filipescu, whose familial past constitutes a most impressive lesson in patriotism".

One of Filipescu's keynote speeches was held in Paris in May of that year, and published in brochure form, proposing a Europe-wide bloc composed of France, Italy, the Little Entente, the Balkan Entente and the Soviet Union, which would help secure borders threatened by revisionism and keep the peace. The same speech proposed a mutual assistance pact between the Soviets and Romania (nevertheless, Filipescu also militated for better Bulgaria–Romania relations). The Filipescu plan was inoperable after the Italian violations in East Africa; Filipescu himself supported the beleaguered Ethiopian Empire, and became known in Italy as "the white Abyssinian". By November 1936, when Italy openly expressed support for a revision of borders in Central Europe, he was prompted to present evidence of Mussolini's collusion with Regency Hungary, leading back to 1928. At the time, he had established a society named after French Premier Louis Barthou, recently assassinated by political extremist Vlado Chernozemski—an act that Filipescu saw as predictive for destruction wrought by hatred. He became critical of Barthou's successor Pierre Laval over his rapprochement with Italy, and called this line "detrimental to Romania's interest." He was similarly outraged that Averescu was still taking pride in having befriended Mussolini, who, Averescu argued, could still be persuaded to change his mind about Hungary.

While valued by the Western media, Filipescu had a fairly negative image in his own country, where, he noted, the major current of thought was pro-Laval and pro-Mussolini. In that context, Filipescu also began challenging the Romanian far-right's claim to an intellectual monopoly on anti-communism, arguing that war and fascism carried the added risk of making the world ripe for a communist takeover. He later also argued that agitation by fascist groups would only strengthen the left, citing the French riots of 1934 being followed by the consolidated Popular Front. He noted that Romanian far-right groups were farcical, in that they had no respect for property rights, proposing instead a nationalism that was both "civilized" and "generous". Filipescu insisted that the best defense against communism was not fascism, but rather a "strengthened coalition of the moderate parties." He supported the Spanish Republic in the Spanish Civil War, which he identified as "less of a fight between two doctrines, and more of a fight between Germany and Great Britain."

Filipescu earned accolades from the Crusade of Romanianism, which was a leftist dissidence of the Iron Guard. Through I. Valoda, the Crusaders described him as the "Romanian figure who is staunchest in his fight for the truth". As paraphrased by Valoda, Filipescu had argued that the "black internationalism" of fascism was the same as "communist tyranny". Filipescu's condemnation of Italian, German and Portuguese participation at the funerals of Ion Moța and Vasile Marin (organized by the Iron Guard in January 1937) drew notice from the Swiss, French and Dutch press. The event also reconciled him with Carol, who took advice from Filipescu and the PNȚ's Ion Mihalache on how to handle the fascist crisis.

In February–March, Filipescu showed his solidarity with Mihalache, who was being marginalized by PNȚ "centrists". His Epoca articles censured the Romanian upper class for cultivating the Iron Guard, informing them that this was a political and social suicide; he "pointed out that such a movement stands as a reaction to the complete immorality of public life and politics, [but that,] in addition to idealists and gullible folk, profiteers from all parties have now appeared." During the local elections of early 1937, the PC, the PNȚ, and the Social Democrats were allied, with underground support from the communists. They sought to contain the Iron Guard and the National Christian Party (PNC), but failed to attract crucial support from other left-wing groups. On the PNȚ's left, Lupu paid homage to Filipescu as an "English-style conservative, the heir to a tradition of purest Romanianism", adding: "I would like to see them claiming that Mr Grigore Filipescu is a communist."

Filipescu ran on the PNȚ list in the local election of April, taking a seat in the Yellow Sector of Bucharest on April 15, and then becoming widely tipped as a potential deputy to the Mayor of Bucharest. The period saw Epoca's targeted attacks on a Guard sympathizer, the economic doctrinaire Mihail Manoilescu. During the resulting trial for libel, Filipescu was able to produce evidence that Manoilescu, despite being antisemitic, had not refused bribes from Jewish businesses. Another Guardist, Dragoș Protopopescu, argued that France's right-wing circles, beyond a number of salons, were with Manoilescu—who was still quoted as a reference by the Action Française. Protopopescu noted that even French anti-fascists were confused about the "immense cretin" Filipescu, since they wrongly credited him as a "former foreign minister of Romania". Also in 1937, Filipescu joined the Crown Council and took part in the meeting that removed Prince Nicholas from the royal family, reluctantly voting with the majority. As such, during his final months, Filipescu was again in conflict with the king. Addressing his party colleagues in October 1937, he demanded that the PNL government step down and be replaced by a Mihalache cabinet. Also then, he depicted fascism as "more redolent of Bolshevism than of the conservative doctrine", and rejected all violent solution to the "Jewish Question". He demanded that the state allocate its resources to combating fascism and defending the Jews. As leader of the PNȚ's "centrist" caucus, Armand Călinescu claimed that Filipescu conspired with Jewish industrialist Max Auschnitt, with both of them coaxing Carol to accept Mihalache's candidacy.

=== Downfall, disease, and death ===
In mid-1936, Italy's Il Piccolo was reporting that Filipescu's views on international affairs no longer sat well with his own followers, some of whom made their schism known with a public protest. In December, Maniu and Filipescu welcomed back to the country the self-exiled Titulescu, and tightened cooperation against Carol. Allegedly, they masterminded Yvon Delbos' official visit to Romania, which occurred, embarrassingly, just as Carol was preparing to have his favorite Tătărescu stand for reelection. Filipescu also reunited with Averescu and Cantacuzino-Grănicerul during secret talks organized by Carol in November. These negotiations also involved the PNC, the Radical Peasants' Party, and Georgists, seeking to coalesce a right-wing monarchist "national union", that would form government. On November 13, 1937, ahead of parliamentary elections in December, the Iron Guard daily Buna Vestire resumed its attacks on Filipescu, noting: "the national-peasantist party is the only Romanian political party—other than Titulescu's ridiculous pawn, Griguță Filipescu—to call for an alliance with the Soviets." On November 26, Maniu sent Filipescu a letter, informing him "that, since national-peasantist and conservative parties have had a similar attitude toward current topics, he has reserved a number of candidacies for him, in both Chamber and Senate". Vaida-Voevod, who had split with the PNȚ, and, as leader of the Romanian Front, allied himself with the PNL, commented at the time that only Maniu "can preserve a balance between Dr Lupu and Gr[igore] Filipescu, between extreme socialism and half-witted conservatism".

Despite their anti-fascism, Filipescu's Conservatives closely followed the Maniu party line, which brought them into a "non-aggression pact" with the Iron Guard—and against Carol's PNL favorites. After various disputes, Filipescu was assigned an eligible position on the PNȚ Ilfov list for the Assembly, third behind Maniu and Lupu. He was elected, beginning his last term in parliament. In January 1938, Patria newspaper, engaging in a polemic with the Conservative Costin G. Sturdza, published allegations according to which Filipescu was acting on behalf of industrialist Oskar Kaufmann, and that he had practiced blackmail throughout his career. The piece also alleged that Filipescu was no longer welcomed in his family's original demesne, Filipeștii de Târg, after having sold it to the local peasants at an exorbitant sum. The latter claim was contradicted by Dreptatea, which stated: "Grigore Filipescu was truly affectionate toward the countryside folk. As much agricultural land as he owned, he refused to sell it for a large price to speculator agriculturalists. He opted instead for selling it to the peasants at a much reduced price."

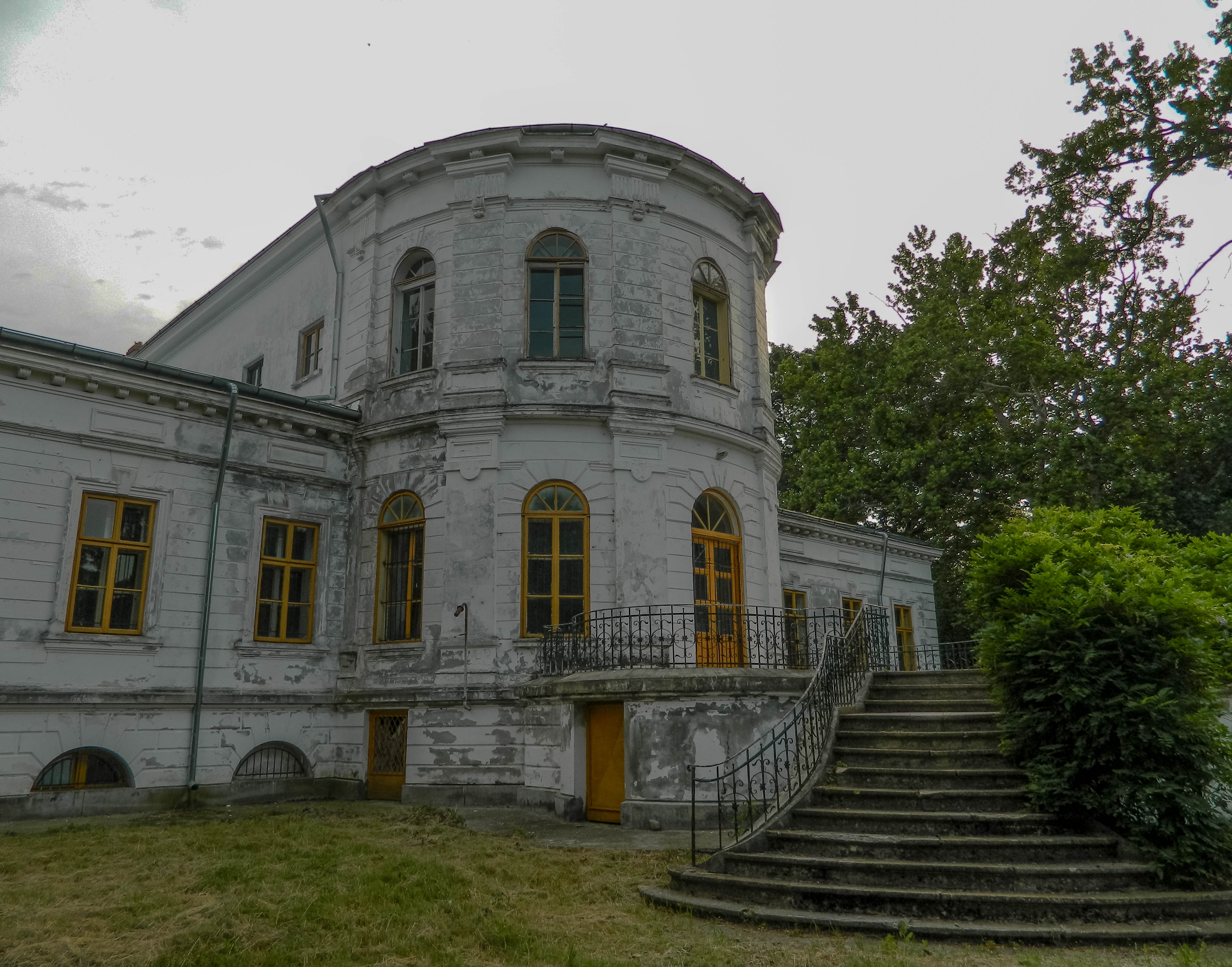
Ghica Palace in Moara Vlăsiei, 2013 photograph

Also in January 1938, the new PNC government, led by Octavian Goga, reportedly suspended Filipescu from his position at the SART. Over the following weeks, Carol led a clampdown against democratic and far-right parties alike. His authoritarian constitution and single-party regime pushed the PC into the underground. In March 1938, Filipescu indefinitely suspended party activities, noting that the group was rendered irrelevant by the "great upheavals facing our continent"; his open letter "liberated his friends from all obligation toward either him or his politics". As his right-wing critics argued, the party was by then inconsistent, drawn into alliances with the left, and ultimately "useless and ridiculous." In May, due to financial problems caused by press restrictions, Filipescu also announced Epoca's effective closure. A heart condition inherited from his father forced him to retire from politics and spend time raising race horses and farming. During April, the SART staff announced that he was still a member of the board, but ailing, and therefore largely absent.

In August 1938, Filipescu entered a hospital in Geneva. Twelve days later, following a heart attack, he was successfully operated upon. His continued weakness required a blood transfusion, which was again accepted by his organism. However, a second transfusion proved fatal. When he died, he was surrounded by his mother, wife and private secretary. Filipescu's body was cremated in Geneva, and the ashes were initially due to be buried on the spot, in accordance with his reported last wish. The decision was reversed, and they were soon after returned to Bucharest. A funeral service was held at the city's Russian Church, and a second one at Batiștei Church; the burial took place at Bellu cemetery.

== Legacy ==
Filipescu's death was mourned in central newspapers such as Dreptatea and Timpul as the demise of a "cavalier", "the last authentic boyar". Writing in September 1943, Ion Anestin added that, though he had only taken up writing as one of his many hobbies, his deceased boss had emerged as "one of the best journalists." Neither the PC nor Epoca were ever revived after their patron's death, with Maria and Ioana Filipescu preserving copyright of the newspaper title. As Romania entered World War II alongside Germany, SART continued to be under American management. In 1941, ITT resold its shares to the Romanian state. This allowed the ITT to repatriate its assets just as Romania and the US declared war on each other. The Filipescu family estate in Postăvari was sold at public auction in June 1939; the one at Moara Vlăsiei hosted the diplomatic corps of Vichy France, then was requisitioned for storage space. By 1948, with the onset of Romanian communism, the estate and its collection were nationalized—despite pleas from the surviving Filipescus and Blarembergs. Filipescu was survived by his mother until 1954, and by his widow until 1971. Though the Filipescu male line was widely seen as extinguished with his death, an adoptive nephew, Nicolae Vlad Filipescu, carried on the legacy from his new home in Paris.

Epoca's Alexandru Vișan, a Conservative Party member who had once been Filipescu's secretary, escaped Romania and settled in the West, where he emerged as a critic of the regime. In 1951, the communist press retaliated by alleging that Vișan was a plagiarist and spy. Repression directly touched the Filipescu family when a Catholic cousin, Vladimir Ghika, died in prison as punishment for his missionary work. Filipescu's own politics were revisited by later communist historiographers. They posthumously granted him recognition as one of the anti-fascist intellectuals who had formed a "broad front" with the Communist Party. As later noted by historian Lucian Boia, this was a spurious list "of those who contributed, evidently without so wishing, to the legitimizing of the communist regime". In a 1986 piece, party historian Vasile Bobocescu lauded Filipescu for his "realistic position" on the issue of fascism, which implied "correcting some of his own political ideas". Discussion of Filipescu's other political contributions followed the Romanian Revolution of 1989. In 2005, philologist Elvira Sorohan rediscovered Filipescu's speech on common sense as a "lesson in rhetorical elegance" and Europeanism. Three years later, political scientist Ioan Stanomir described the "bizarre political figure" Filipescu and his Epoca as afterthoughts of Romanian conservatism—by then, the "statist, autarkist, nationalist" PNL had won its "victory".
