= Vlad Țepeș League =

Vlad Țepeș League Conservative Party Liga Vlad Țepeș Partidul Conservator
- President: Grigore Filipescu
- Founded: June 1929
- Dissolved: March 15, 1938
- Headquarters: Nicolae Filipescu Street 26, Bucharest
- Newspaper: Epoca
- Youth wing: Tineretul Țepist (to 1930)
- Ideology: Anti-democracy; Conservatism; Monarchism; Economic liberalism National conservatism (Romanian); Anti-communism; Anti-fascism; Fascism (minority; to 1931)
- Political position: Center-right to far-right
- National affiliation: National Union (1931–1932); Antirevisionist League (1933); Anti-Bolshevik Front (1935)

The Vlad Țepeș League (Romanian: Liga Vlad Țepeș, LVȚ; colloquially Țepiști, singular form: Țepist), later Conservative Party (Partidul Conservator, PC), was a political party in Romania, founded and presided upon by Grigore Filipescu. A "right-wing conservative" movement, it emerged around Filipescu's Epoca newspaper, and gave political expression to his journalistic quarrels. Primarily, the party supported the return of Prince Carol as King of Romania, rejecting the Romanian Regency regime, and questioning democracy itself. Filipescu stirred public controversy with his critique of democracy, drawing suspicions that he was creating a localized fascism. In its original form, the LVȚ idealized efficient government by dictatorial means, and allowed its fringes to be joined by ultra-nationalists and fascists. One of these was the youth-wing organizer, Gheorghe Beza, expelled from the group in 1930, after his assassination attempt on minister Constantin Angelescu.

The League achieved its main goal in 1930, when Carol took the throne, but failed to capitalize on the gains. LVȚ and PC monarchism was largely within the classical political spectrum, reclaiming the legacy of the old-regime Conservative Party. Its ostensive veneration of Vlad the Impaler, seen as an icon of justifiable violence against corrupt forces, was toned down by an appreciation of Toryism and of political moderates such as Iancu Flondor. Always a minor force, the PC relied on support from larger parties, beginning with the Democratic Nationalist Party (PND), which rewarded Filipescu's support by making him Prefect of Ilfov County. The League formed part of the government arc, or "National Union", during and after the parliamentary election of June 1931; by 1932, 17 members of the Assembly of Deputies were affiliated with the LVȚ. As exponents of economic liberalism, Filipescu and his followers were strongly opposed to the debt relief policies embraced by the PND and most other parties, identifying them with "Bolshevism".

The group split with the PND and sought other alliances—first the People's Party (PP), with statistically insignificant results in the December 1933 election; and later the National Peasants' Party (PNȚ), which had come to resent Carol's intrusion in national politics. During that interval, the LVȚ continued to espouse anti-communism, but also encouraged a tactical rapprochement between Romania and the Soviet Union—prioritizing opposition to Nazi Germany. While the more radical LVȚ members left to join the Iron Guard, Filipescu stated his anti-fascism. The League contested the local elections of early 1937 as a member of a PNȚ-led democratic and anti-fascist alliance, registering moderate success. It also followed the PNȚ line in the subsequent general election, when both parties had a non-aggression pact with the Iron Guard. Carol ultimately banned all political groups in early 1938, before creating his own single-party regime around a National Renaissance Front—which some former Țepiști agreed to join. The PC suspended itself in March 1938, and Filipescu's death in August put a definitive end to its activities.

== History ==
=== Radical beginnings ===
The LVȚ was founded in June 1929 by Filipescu, a former politician of the pre-World War I Conservative Party. He had later helped establish the right-wing PP, but was expelled by Alexandru Averescu, allegedly for insubordination and factionalism. In September 1919, he became associated with General Gheorghe Cantacuzino-Grănicerul, with whom he explored the possibility of forming a "Republican Party". Fluctuating between several parties and trying to revive the conservative movement, Filipescu had been affiliated with the PNȚ, ultimately returning to the PP in early 1927. This was the period of a Regency regime, which looked after public affairs for the child-King Michael I, and which Filipescu resented. He revived the old Bucharest Conservative daily Epoca, directing it against establishment politicians and, in particular, against Barbu Știrbey, his lover Queen Marie, and the domineering National Liberal Party (PNL). Unlike the political mainstream of Greater Romania, he expressed a tolerant view of communism: appearing as a defense witness for Boris Stefanov, jailed leader of the Romanian Communist Party, he argued that "in today's difficult economic situation, [communists] should be asked to provide their input."

Although widely tipped as a PP front-runner, Filipescu left the party when Averescu asked him to stop attacking Știrbey, being closely followed by his disciples Nicolae Enescu-Fierbinți, who had led the PP organization in Ilfov County, and N. Popescu, former head of the PP lodge in Pantelimon. The League, whose offices were at his home on Nicolae Filipescu Street 26, was centered on Epoca, but also put out two political newspapers in the provinces: Timpul (Râmnicu Sărat) and Tribuna Liberă (Râmnicu Vâlcea). Founded to appeal to centrist conservatives and monarchists, it grouped some members of the old landowning class, including the wealthy Nicolae Mareș; they were joined with industrialists such as the Armenian-Romanian Alfred Cerchez. Other major figures were Alexandru Periețeanu (as the economic doctrinaire), Henric Oteteleșeanu (as adviser on cultural issues), and Nicolae Miclescu. The League was nevertheless an eclectic movement: existing alongside "a plethora of 'leagues' and 'guards', more or less secretive, more or less prone to violence", it also hosted national conservatives and fascist sympathizers, including Cantacuzino-Grănicerul and Amos Frâncu. The latter had previously organized the ultra-nationalist and antisemitic Cross Brotherhood of Transylvania, as well as an episodic National Radical Peasants' and Workers' Party. The League's youth wing, Tineretul Țepist, was organized by the Aromanian Gheorghe Beza, who also had flirtations with the local far-right. The first conference of this subgroup was held in November 1929, with Beza lecturing on the choice between democracy and dictatorship. He was a violent and intolerant figure, who reportedly slapped another LVȚ affiliate, Radu Budișteanu, prompting the latter to leave the group in June 1930.

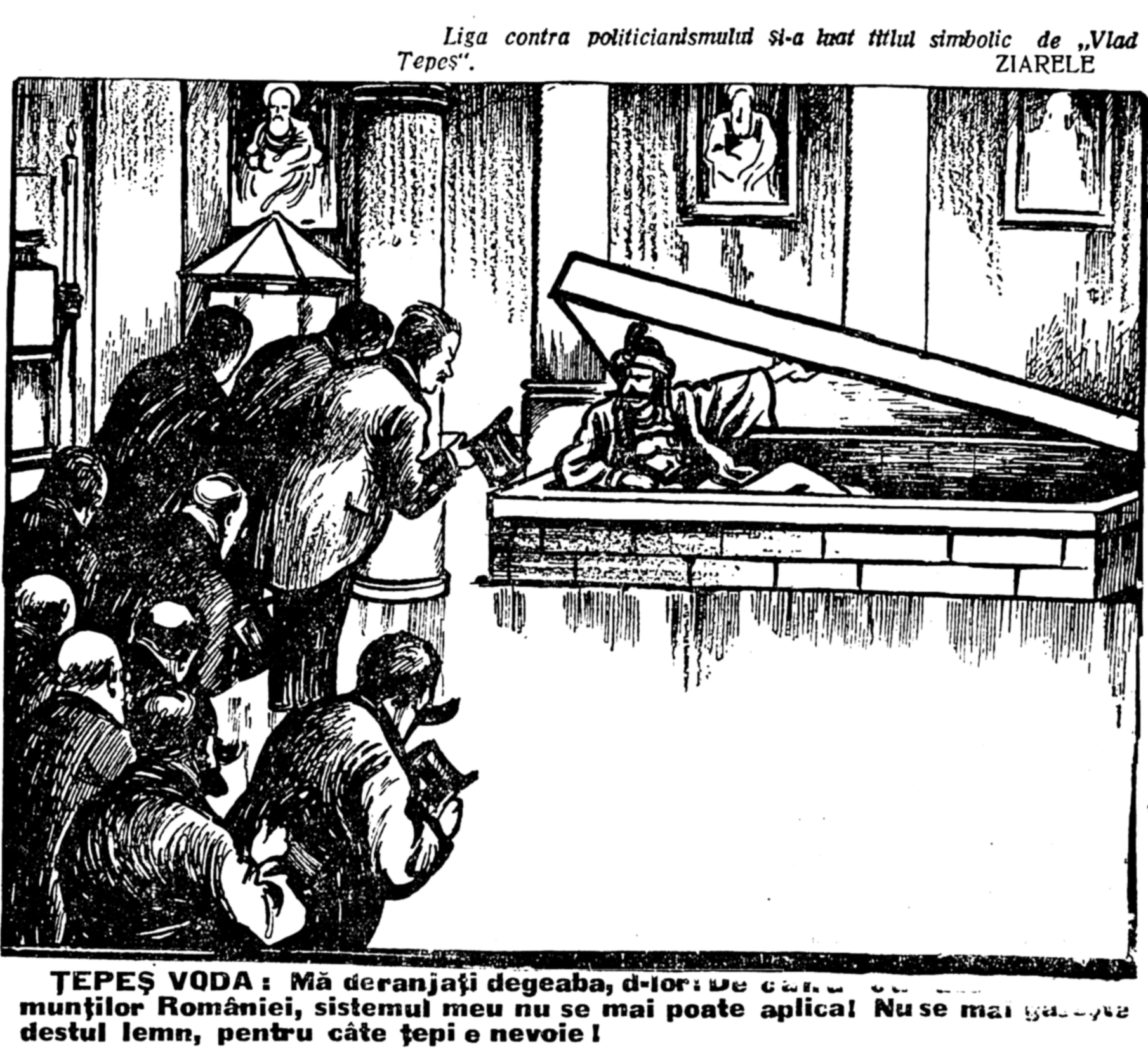
Filipescu and his followers waking Vlad the Impaler from his slumber, in a June 1929 cartoon by Curentul. Vlad angrily informs them that deforestation prevents him from impaling all those in need of the treatment

With its choice of name, the group honored the medieval prince, Vlad the Impaler, who was ruthless against corruption. Vlad was notably the protagonist in a 1930 play by Ludovic Dauș, which documented his many violent repressions and hinted at his necessary return. This cultural nod was reviewed by the humorist Nae Dumitrescu Țăranu, who doubted that Filipescu cold ever fulfill the promise: even in the event that all "scoundrels" and "exploiters of the country" would find themselves impaled on Filipescu's orders, some would bribe the executioner and have their stakes fitted with "comfy stools". In a June 1931 debate, George Grigorovici of the Social Democratic Party (PSDR) argued that impalement was an Ottoman practice, and hence that it reminded one of an uncomfortable time in Romanian history. As noted in 1932 by the review Le Monde Slave, the Vlad reference condensed the League's own "political romanticism": "it wants to purify public life using strong measures, if need be through blood and iron, that is to say by dictatorial means." Its violence was "a verbal violence, within the limits of legality." As early as August 1929, journalist I. Hașegan noted that Filipescu's group had opportunities created for it by the other political players, capitalizing on their mistakes. Between the other parties' internecine "fight for extermination" and "infamies", the "reactionaries" could "garner sympathy and adhesion from all around."

The League's consequent demand for a ban on political parties remained particularly controversial, and caused the League to be seen as a "fascist element" in Romanian society, or, as noted by Filipescu himself, a "retrograde" faction. Both attributes were raised by the PNL's Viitorul in July 1929; it reminded Filipescu that Benito Mussolini himself saw no point to "exporting" Italian fascism. On behalf of the socialists, Grigorovici assessed that "Țepist presence in our public life is the introduction of a Romanianized fascism." Despite becoming known abroad as Romania's "Baby Fascist", Filipescu openly rejected Mussolinism, which he often derided in his Epoca articles. Days after creating the League, he debated the issue with the anti-fascist paper Adevărul, defending himself against the label. As he explained at the time, Mussolini was superfluous, in a country that had already had its Vlad. While touring Bukovina in mid-1930, he and Constantin "Costin" G. Sturdza also invoked the local aristocrat, Iancu Flondor, as a relevant political model. This claim was criticized by the PNL's Glasul Bucovinei, which, while opposed to Flondor's deep conservatism, noted that Flondor would never have endorsed a dictatorial project.

Filipescu's anti-democratic idealization, deplored by Le Monde Slave, did not go as far as to demand a putsch. He noted that dictatorship was an ideal for later on, and that the LVȚ only hoped to prepare the terrain for its application. Based on such attitudes, which he called dictatorship "with bells around its neck", political journalist Tudor Teodorescu-Braniște wrote off the League as "entertainment, and on such dreary days!" In his diary, Grigore Gafencu of the PNȚ speculated that Filipescu and his colleagues wanted all other groups eliminated only because of their own political irrelevancy:

Most of them are 'good lads'—lads aged thirty to sixty—, more or less failed at life, who have accumulated, in their never-ending youth, a youth during which none of them was able to fulfill the expectations of others, a bitter sense of frustration toward all those who have managed more than they have. [...] They resent demagoguery only because they're so very genteel men. And because they're lazy."

=== Beza affair and PND government ===
Filipescu's movement confronted a PNȚ government presided upon by Iuliu Maniu, with Alexandru Vaida-Voevod at Internal Affairs. During the final days of June 1929, Filipescu alleged that the Romanian secret service, or Siguranța, was planning a raid on his home. This claim was publicly dismissed by the authorities. On July 25, Vaida reported to the Senate of Romania about his administrative reform, briefly discussing the "conspiratorial" opposition groups. In his view, the League men, whom he called Țepeluși ("Little Impalers"), simply served to ruin the country's image abroad. By September, rumor had spread that Filipescu had a secret understanding with the Democratic Nationalist Party (PND), chaired by Nicolae Iorga, seeking to topple Maniu. From August to mid-October, with Filipescu absent from the country, the League's activity was on hiatus, though Costel Nicolau-Stroești was allowed to establish a Țepist presence in the Banat.

An instrumental purpose of the LVȚ was redirecting support for the exiled Prince Carol, who wished to return to Romania and depose his son. Filipescu was seen as the prince's "most devoted friend" and "one of [his] confidants". As acknowledged by Cerchez, the League had the Carlist agenda for a primary objective. Throughout his party's inaugural year, Filipescu debated with the more radical Carlist Nae Ionescu, who had been harshly critical of the Romanian Regency regime. Ionescu's preferences were still directed toward the PNȚ, which, he noted, had real representation in the countryside, and therefore among the peasant majority. He argued that, since Romania had adopted the universal male suffrage, the LVȚ, as an urban phenomenon, was "doomed to boggle down." According to Le Monde Slave, the similarities between Filipescu and Ionescu ended where Filipescu became anti-theoretical, "honest and trenchant", "one of the last examples of Romanian conservatives."

The LVȚ's participation in the first wave of local elections, which took place in March 1930, included appeals to a protest vote. This was the case in the Blue (Third) Sector of Bucharest, where sidewalks were painted with its slogan, Anulați-vă votul ("Spoil Your Ballot"). Elsewhere, it used posters which showed a menacing Vlad the Impaler, and which, journalist Ion Dimitrescu attests, were vandalized by other electoral agents, "with all the energy that partisans get from hatred or from panic." The elections introduced a peasant candidate, Stan G. Perșinaru, who took the mayoral seat in his native Cazaci, Dâmbovița County. The LVȚ also carried mayoral races in two communes of Ilfov—though a modest result, it prompted Dimitrescu to consider that the League may have indeed "captured the minds of common folk".

In May 1930, Filipescu allowed the publication of "controversial matter regarding Prince Carol", which resulted in Epoca being temporarily banned by Maniu; the Romanian Police, arriving at the newspaper's offices, was met by its enraged owner, who had to be restrained. Filipescu's "extreme" approach was by then also directed against local fascists, such as in July 1930, when he demanded the reintroduction of capital punishment, especially for his former associate Beza. Beza, who was also working as an interviewer at Epoca, had been arrested after attempting to kill PNL minister Constantin Angelescu. According to his own testimony, he was paid to do so by the Iron Guard, a leading far-right movement; Filipescu himself claimed to have previously barred Beza from publishing pro-Guardist articles in Epoca. Beza also recalled that, also in 1930, he merged Tineretul Țepist into the Guard—though its activists continued to act independently, and eventually seceded violently in 1934. Three months after his election, Perșinaru was detained as a suspect in the Beza affair.

Carol returned triumphantly in June 1930, after a months-long national press campaign in which Epoca represented the moderate side. In repeat elections for the Bucharest City and Sector councils, held in October 1930, Filipescu openly sided with Iorga. Their shared an Electoral List No 2, using a triangle logo, managed to obtain a fifth of the vote in the Yellow (First) Sector, upsetting what was otherwise a PNȚ sweep. The cartel was persuaded into joining the majority, in the interest of the "common good"; Filipescu submitted his candidacy for Yellow-Sector Mayor, but only took one vote from the Sector Council, with all other sixteen going to Aurel Bolintineanu. In early 1931, the LVȚ stood by Maniu, criticizing the opposition's demand for early elections. Filipescu asked for, and was granted, the prefecture of Ilfov (which included the whole of Bucharest), wishing to present himself as a model administrator. The League was also granted the prefectures in Ciuc—with Dinu Stolojan, and in Odorhei—with Vasile R. Cupărescu, who was also the LVȚ's head organizer in Transylvania.

The League switched its allegiance back to the PND, after Carol appointed Iorga as his Prime Minister. It then contested the June 1931 general election as part of the National Union alliance, which was headed by Iorga. According to La Revue Slave, Epoca had an important part to play in the agitation leading up to the elections, supporting Iorga's ideal of government by technocrats. According to the PNȚ press, the deal nearly fell apart when Filipescu and his men vehemently opposed Tancred Constantinescu, a former PNL minister whom the PND wanted included on the shared list in Tighina County. In late June, Filipescu announced that: "The Vlad Țepeș League has indeed formed a cartel with the government, but still reserves the right to reject those laws it sees as unsound." The Union won 289 seats in the Assembly of Deputies, of which the LVȚ took five. One of these was at Ilfov, were the PND's Constantin Argetoianu was elected, but ceded his position to the LVȚ's Enescu-Fierbinți; another one was in Covurlui County, taken by Sturdza—who, upon winning, allegedly engaged in a public brawl with Paul Kelemen, of the local Georgist Liberals.

The Ilfov chapter of the LVȚ soon engaged in a dispute with government over selecting the Mayor of Bucharest—the Țepiști rooted for General Alexandru Lupescu, who was politically independent. During the by-elections of Neamț County in August 1931, the League expressed its dissatisfaction with the Iorga administration, and introduced Perșinaru as its own candidate. This split the vote, resulting in that seat being taken by the Iron Guard leader, Corneliu Zelea Codreanu. Perșinaru was ridiculed in Glasul Bucovinei for only obtaining 65 votes, as compared to over 7,000 taken by Codreanu; as the newspaper noted, this "scolding lesson", alongside the PNL's coming in second, clarified that the masses were not in fact tired of party politics. On October 1, 1931, Filipescu relinquished his prefecture to a League subordinate, Toma Metaxa.

LVȚ organizers
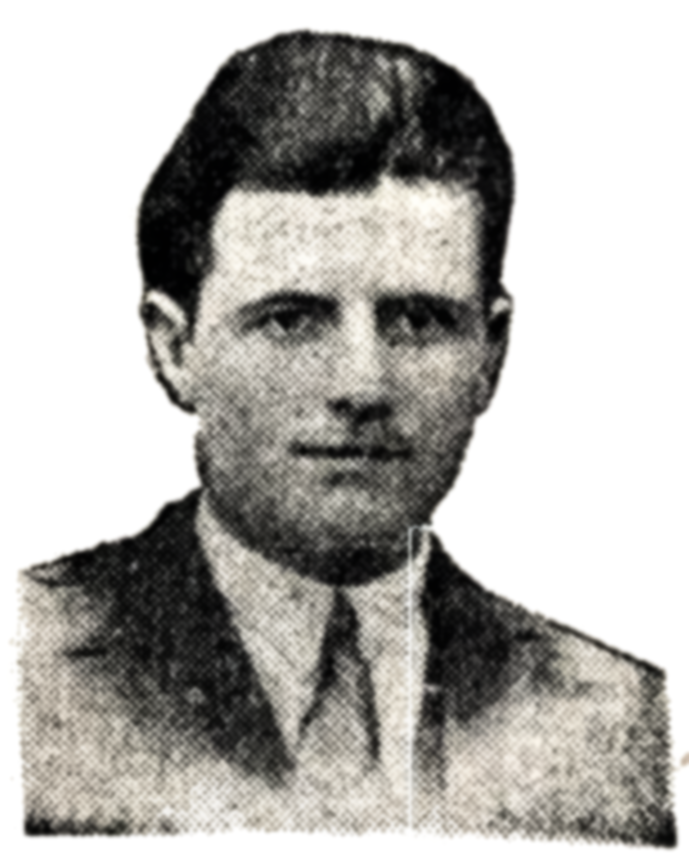
Gheorghe Beza in 1936

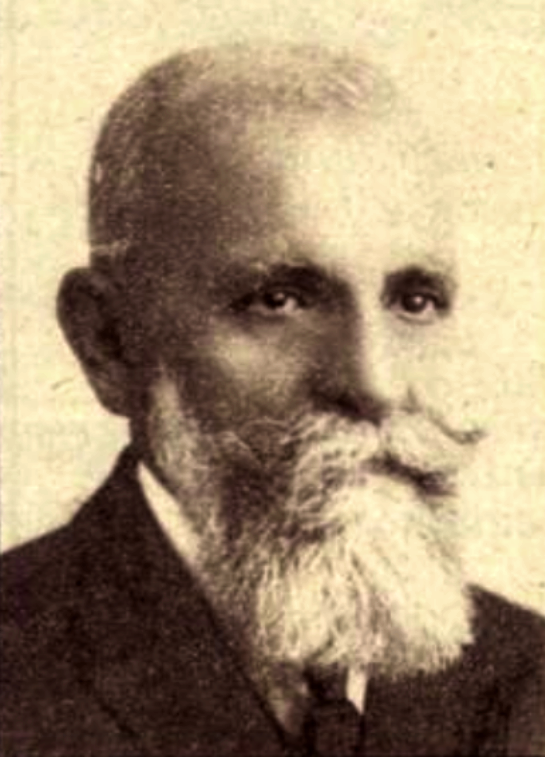
Gheorghe Cantacuzino-Grănicerul in 1931

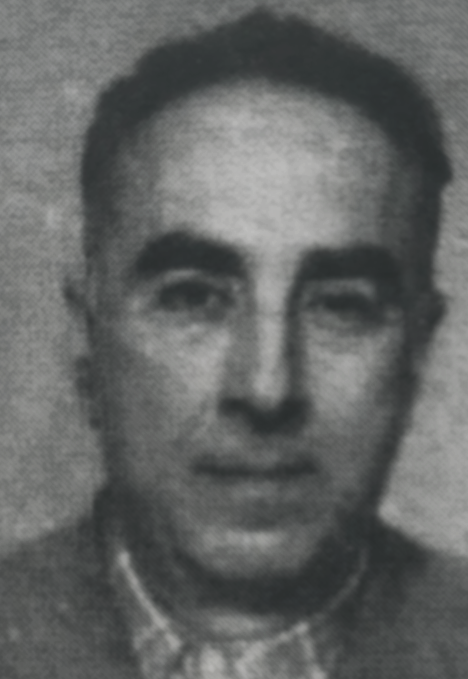
Alfred Cerchez in 1951

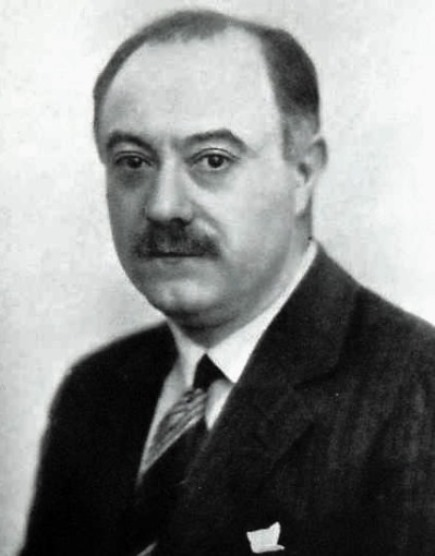
Grigore Filipescu, c. 1936

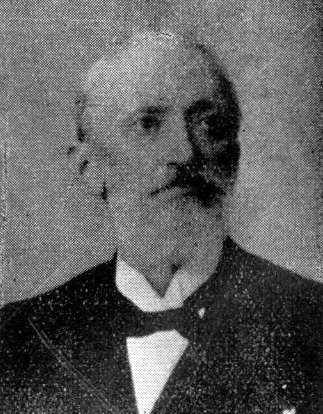
Amos Frâncu, unknown date

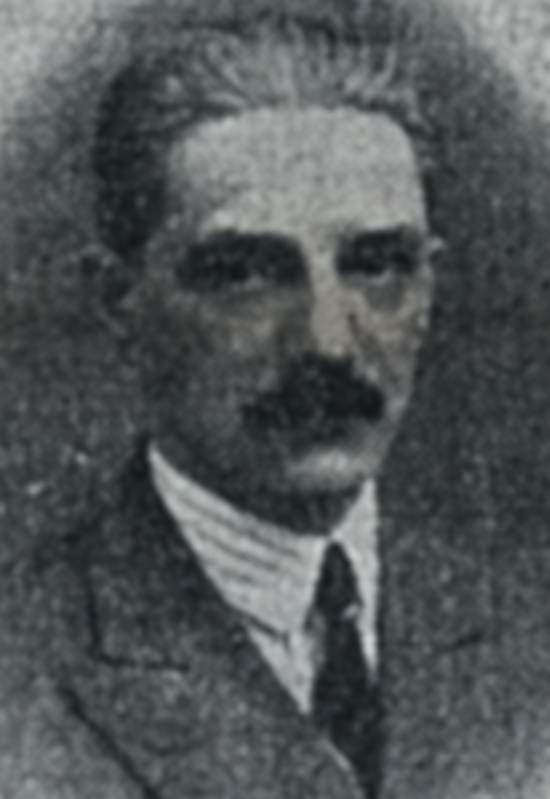
Emanoil Hagi-Moscu in 1932

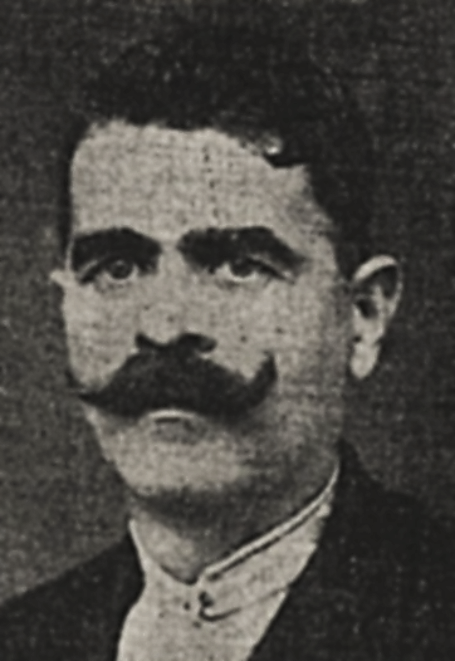
Stan G. Perșinaru, c. 1910

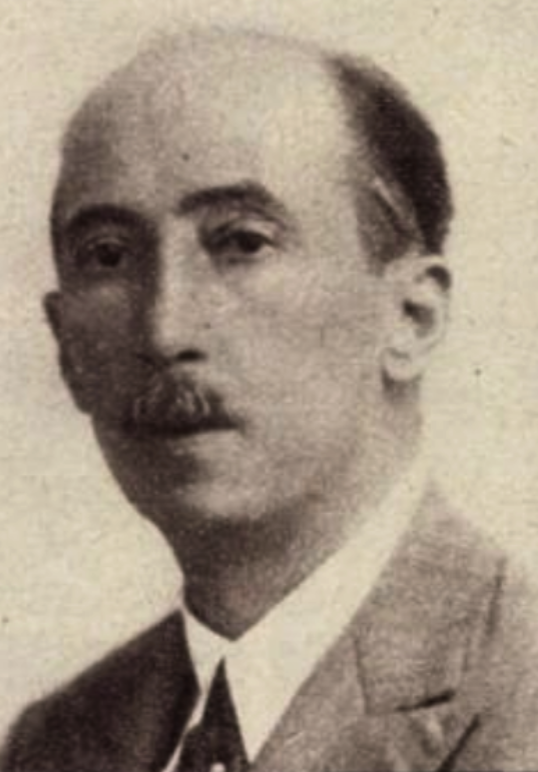
Costin G. Sturdza in 1931

=== Tory-like transformation ===
At a League congress held at Bucharest's Tomis Hall in November 1931, Filipescu was reelected League president. He was seconded by a Central Council, or Sfat, whose members were also elected during the congress. On that occasion, Filipescu announced that the LVȚ was primarily a conservative movement indebted to Britain's Conservative and Unionist group (which he described as a "traditional organism" rather than a party), and also a direct successor to the defunct Romanian Conservative Party. The latter mission had already been deduced by Viitorul in 1929: "Mr Grigore Filipescu's action seems to bleed into a revivalist manifestation of the old conservative party. [...] The national-liberal party is as determined as ever to [...] continue with its left-wing orientation. That being so, there is room to the right of the national-liberal party for the establishment of a conservative party." Such revelations prompted journalist Dem. Theodorescu to comment on Filipescu's "freaky initiative", that of lining himself up with a forgotten, and therefore unpopular, ideology. According to Theodorescu, Filipescu was returning to conservatism just as the British were set on embracing "new substances", including some mixtures of Toryism and Labourism.

Relations between the League and the PND also became tense. On January 11, 1932, the PNL's Richard Franasovici noted the LVȚ's "hostile attitude" toward Iorga, and argued that the cabinet was at Filipescu's mercy. Later that month, Undersecretary of State Alexandru Radian joked that the LVȚ had managed to pack a hall in Deva only because Devans had "nothing much in the way of entertainment"; Filipescu replied in Epoca, depicting Radian as Argetoianu's lackey. The following month, the League was reportedly prevented from holding a rally in Târgoviște, since it intended to bring up "issues that our leaders are not quite keen on hearing." Also then, an LVȚ deputy, Emanoil Hagi-Moscu, joined with the PNL's Petru Cazacu in questioning government about its administration of Bessarabia; he suggested that government appointees such as Ion Buzdugan and Gherman Pântea were either incompetent or malevolent. Pântea later sued Hagi-Moscu for Epoca articles which detailed the claims, but dropped the case in November 1939, after "countless postponements".

On March 10, 1932, Filipescu took his party out of the governing alliance, censuring Iorga's fiscal policies in the wake of the Great Depression. On behalf of the League, Sturdza noted that corruption and incompetence were more serious issues than the economic crisis: "In our country, where ninety percent of the population lives from agriculture, where the people are so needy, a serious crisis such as this one should never have occurred. Romania should have blossomed as an oasis among countries in crisis. However, money was wasted here, luxury was introduced to the state machinery, and that is why we are in such an awful financial position today." In particular, Filipescu and his followers rejected debt relief promises, contained within a project submitted by Argetoianu and Radian, as an attack on economic liberalism. Some twelve days later, Metaxa resigned the prefecture, noting his difference with both Filipescu's personality and the anti-PND line; he was immediately replaced by another Țepist, Colonel Aurel Solacolu. Soon after, LVȚ deputy Sergiu Lecca split with his party during the vote on debt relief, and was promptly excluded from its ranks. The group had been joined by others, and had 16 deputies after Lecca's departure. These were: Cantacuzino, Eugen Catargi, Grigore T. Coandă, Arthur Corbaru, Enescu-Fierbinți, Hagi-Moscu, Gheorghe Ionescu, Mareș, Miclescu, Nicolae Missir, Emil Ottulescu, Ion Rosetti Bălănescu, Leon Sculi, C. A. Spulber, Sturdza, and Ioan Vlasopol.

Also on March 10, Filipescu had reformed the LVȚ, formally reclaiming for the title of "Conservative Party" (PC). It used as its logo "two triangles formed by two lines crossing" (⋈). This change caused a dispute in the Assembly between Sturdza and Nicolae L. Lupu of the Peasants' Party, who claimed that deputies elected on the LVȚ list were legally required to resign. Ioga and Argetoianu were lenient toward the Conservatives, and refused to allow a vote on this issue. In the recall elections of July 1932 the PC ran alone, with Filipescu headlining the list in Ilfov, Dâmbovița, and Dolj. New recruits presented as candidates included provincial notabilities such as Scarlat Orăscu, Isac I. Benvenisti, Menelas Chircu, Grigore Cugler Sr, General Traian Epure, Ion Glogoveanu, George Iorgala, and Nicolae Zlotescu; of these, Iorgala had previously been active within Jean Th. Florescu's Omul Liber faction. An ethnically diverse list was put up in Timiș-Torontal County: headlined by Periețeanu and lawyer Dimitrie Bottez, it included a Serb, Lazar Omorjan, a Magyar, Francisc Szabotka, and a Swabian, Filip Ochsenfeld; all three were engineers. Canvassing in ethnically diverse Arad County that summer, Sturdza explained that the PC favored integrating cultural minorities inside the Romanian parties, and announced that many Romanian Jews and Székelys had already joined Filipescu's party. One case was that of Benvenisti, who was in tandem a spokesman for the Sephardic Jews of Bucharest.

Logo of the Antirevisionist League, to which the Conservatives were affiliated. Shows a Romanian peasant guarding the borders of Greater Romania

The group as a whole took just 0.62 of the vote nationally, and thus failing to meet the electoral threshold. On October 23, 1932, supported by Maniu and the PNȚ, Filipescu was returned to the Senate by the mayors of Vlașca County. Throughout 1933, the Țepiști mounted opposition to a new, PNȚ government, chaired by Vaida-Voevod. During February, Filipescu was arguing that the PNȚ was in reality two parties: a Carlist one, formed around Vaida-Voevod, and a more populist one, under Maniu's guidance; in his view, Maniu and his followers were preferable. Filipescu still sought to impose himself in the public eye with his stance on debt, sparking a national debate over the need to restore the country risk to more manageable levels—with austerity as the norm. By March, he had expressed his intention of forming an alliance with Averescu and the PP. In Cuvântul, Titus Devechi spoke of this rapprochement as a "carnival", with Filipescu as its "first-class comedian."

According to the PNȚ's organ Dreptatea, this was a confusing year for Filipescu, who had been isolated by the other parties support for debt relief. As read by Dreptatea, the PC was embracing the paradox of a conservative revolution, with "shock troops" being deployed against a democratic consensus. On August 7, members of the Front for Urban Debt-clearance stormed into Ramuri hall, Craiova, to prevent Filipescu from speaking against debt relief. Another heated debate took place between Cupărescu and PNȚ figures, regarding government aid targeted at the Depression-hit Apuseni Mountains. Cupărescu declared that Vaida-Voevod's Apuseni Commissariat was a tâmpenie democratică ("democratic idiocy"). On other issues, the PC adhered to the political consensus: Periețeanu participated in the civic movement for the Little Entente and against Hungarian irredentism; called "Antirevisionist League", it also grouped figures from the PNȚ, PNL, and National Agrarian Party.

=== From Anti-Bolshevik Front to Soviet rapprochement ===
PNL cabinet, headed by Ion G. Duca, called for legislative elections in December 1933. As Guardist violence mounted, specifically targeting Jews, Filipescu declared that "those who picture that they're serving nationalism by beating on the Jew have no place in the conservative party"; he also criticized the self-segregating Jewish Party, but acknowledged that it had a right to present itself in elections. At the same time, Filipescu chided Duca for his order to ban the Iron Guard, arguing that the latter movement included a number of "enthusiastic, clear-minded youths", and that, overall, it was less dangerous for Romania than the League Against Usury, which had escaped unharmed. The Conservatives initially submitted their own list, assigning eligible positions to Filipescu, Epure, Hagi-Moscu, Miclescu, Ottulescu, Zlotescu, Gheorghe Budișteanu, and Ilie Pănoiu. Within a week, they went back on this decision and formed a cartel with the PP—Filipescu and Sturdza were assigned positions on the PP Assembly list, both of them for Ilfov.

The campaign in Cluj County was joined by Filipescu's personal secretary, Alexandru Vișan, whose attempt to speak at Gherla was "sabotaged by a group of government supporters." This alliance registered dismal results in the Assembly race, but managed to win three senatorial seats: Filipescu was elected in Durostor, Miclescu—in Cahul, and Orăscu—in Cetatea Albă. In all three precincts, the PNL had withdrawn its candidates, leading the PNȚ's newspapers to claim that the PC had a secret pact with Duca. The election brought a major win for the PNL, but the victorious Premier Duca was assassinated on December 29 by an Iron Guard death squad. His replacement, Gheorghe Tătărescu, was allowed by Carol to impose a state of emergency, which was repeatedly prolonged. With his Senate speeches, Filipescu pressured Tătărescu government to report on the matter, noting that Duca's assassins had been caught, tried, and sentenced; this effort was backed by the PNȚ's Grigore Gafencu and Mihail Mora.

The PP–PC alliance was still functional in March 1934, as a coordinated opposition. By mid-1934, Filipescu tried to win himself an Assembly seat in the by-elections of Ilfov, though the PC decided not to put any candidates for local elections, since it continued to regard city government as beyond the scope of party politics. The party was moving closer to the democratic opposition movement formed by the PNȚ, now controlled by Maniu, against King Carol. Filipescu and Maniu agreed that Carol was an autocrat, and, according to rumors, began flirting with republicanism. In August 1934, Filipescu hosted in Bucharest a grand reception in honor of Maniu. At Epoca, Sturdza voiced his belief that Romania under the PNL was an autocratic democracy, to which a fully dictatorial regime was preferable—his writings on the topic formed part of a dispute with Dimineața columnist Barbu Brănișteanu, who preferred "an incomplete democratic regime, to a dictatorship that can only be complete". In March 1935, the issue of emergency laws pushed the PC closer to the PP, the PNȚ, the Radical Peasants' Party (PȚR) and the Georgists, with which it hoped to form a tactical alliance. This was weakened by the PȚR, which insisted that Maniu had tolerated corruption and was therefore unfrequentable. Filipescu continued to view economic nationalism as engendering disaster with its debt-relief programs, which, he argued, were akin to "Bolshevism". Also in 1935, he and Aurel Vlad set up an "Anti-Bolshevik Front", touring the country to persuade the masses not to vote for such measures.

In 1936, PC still described itself as "essentially dynastic" and "essentially nationalist". In May 1934, it had a central committee, composed of Cerchez, Cugler, Glagoveanu, Hagi-Moscu, Missir, Periețeanu, Vlasopol, Zlotescu, Aurel Dumitrescu, and Commodore Octav Nedelcu; Iorgala was leader of the Covurlui chapter to his death in October 1934. At some point during that interval, Vlad was attested as a card-carrying member of the PC, and a party eminence—alongside Filipescu, Ottulescu, and Periețeanu. By then, Filipescu had lost some of his supporters on the right, including Cantacuzino. They were either attracted into the more successful Iron Guard, or tried to reestablish the old LVȚ with support from the anti-Carlist General Ion Antonescu. In 1935, Mareș "did not belong to any political party", and assisted in negotiations between Antonescu and Codreanu, seeking to form a government of national unity around the Iron Guard.

For his part, Filipescu was a staunch critic of the Guard's fascism, particularly alarmed by the possibility of an alliance between Romania and Nazi Germany. In early 1935, Vaida-Voevod's new radical group, the Romanian Front, made concrete proposals for positive discrimination in favor of the Romanians—with suggestions about imposing Jewish quotas. While other mainstream groups accepted such ideas as desirable and feasible, the Conservatives warned that Vaida was a political adventurer, and that implementing such programs risked ruining Romania's defensive alliances in Europe, while empowering the hostile minorities. For a while, Filipescu himself weighed the possibility of a Romanian–German alliance against a rapprochement with the Soviet Union. In December 1935, he visited Berlin and had a meeting with Hermann Göring, who was trying to prevent Romania from opening up to the Soviets. Some months later, Epoca celebrated as the Romanian authorities clamped down on the outlawed Romanian Communist Party in preparation for the mass trial of Craiova; at the time, it speculated that "communism has folded itself neatly under the label of 'anti-fascism'".

The group changed its approach in May 1936, when Filipescu explored the possibility of France joining hands with the Little Entente, the Balkan Entente, Italy, and the Soviet Union, as a guarantee against war and for the existing borders. Moreover, he envisaged a mutual assistance pact between the Soviets and Romania. In November, as a self-defined "unrelenting enemy of communist ideas", he opposed the far-right's claim to an intellectual monopoly on anti-communism. At that stage, he was arguing that any European war, even one generated by fascism, would result in a communist takeover. In December, he spoke at the Conservative Club in favor of a "moderate-party" union against both fascism and communism, criticizing the Romanian far-right as faux conservatives. As he noted, none of the fascist and pro-fascist groups actually stood for "property rights", their nationalism being neither "civilized" nor "generous". Although critical of the French Popular Front, he insisted that Romania could only rely on the strength of her friendship with France. In the Senate, Miclescu also declared his skepticism toward the PNȚ's goal of establishing the "peasant state", since "villagers would be content with knowing that the country is no longer run by politicians, but by steadfast homesteaders."

=== Demise and posterity ===
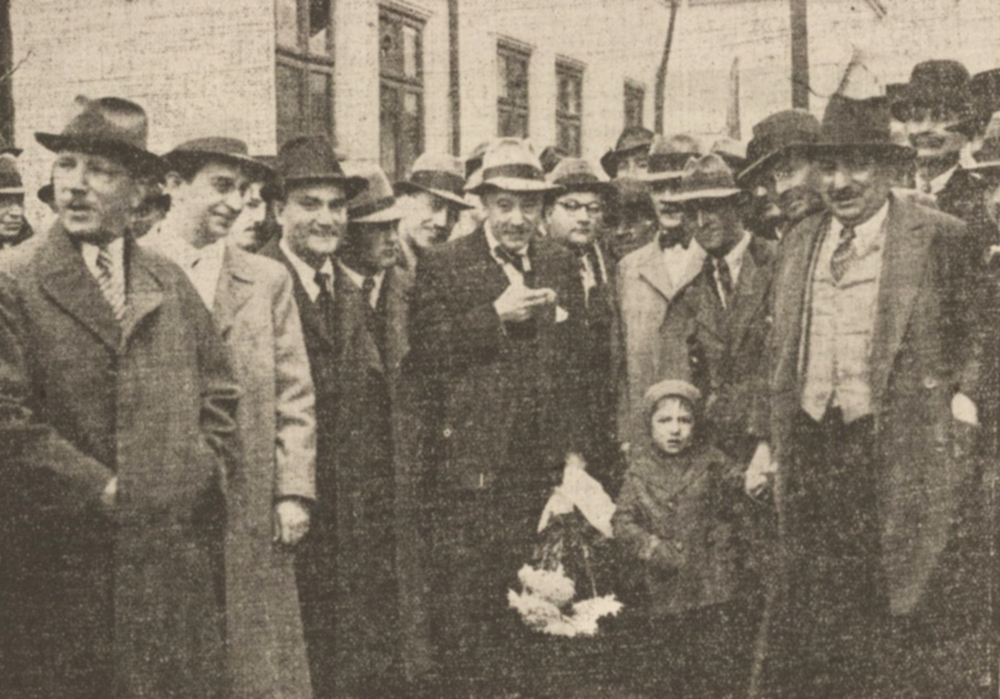
Filipescu (middle, holding bouquet) with the other Conservative delegates after the October 1937 congress at Lucifer Cinema

As noted by Georges Oudard, the PC never stood a chance to regain power, but became noted for advocating "the sanity of economic and financial orthodoxy against the temptations of a coming world". The party criticized all attempts at furthering the land reform, and, through Periețeanu, proposed abandoning the gold standard for the Romanian leu, favoring fiat money as the "best economic policy"—although, as Filipescu had argued in 1931, this measure was seen by the PC as tragic. Periețeanu also wanted the state to withdraw from any regulation of foreign trade. During the local elections of early 1937, the PC formalized its alliance with the PNȚ and PSDR, with underground support from the Communist Party. This pact, ridiculed from the right, was meant to curb the rise of the Iron Guard and the National Christian Party (PNC). A sympathetic review in Dimineața called it a "front for the defense of democracy", suggesting that Filipescu's "right-wing party" had rallied with the left as a "warning to the supporters of dictatorship." The alliance only became functional in some areas of the country, and, overall, its bid failed, again due to PȚR opposition. Filipescu himself ran on the PNȚ list for the Yellow Sector, during which time the far-right publicized his links to Jewish businessmen; he managed to win a seat on the Bucharest Council, on April 19. By August, he was reportedly emerging as a favorite in the coming selection of a deputy to the Bucharest Mayor.

In 1935–1936, Filipescu expressed his disdain toward Italian fascism, and supported the Ethiopian Empire in its effort to resist the Italian invasion. According to claims made in Italy's Il Piccolo, this did not sit well with his followers: in July 1936, "a numerous group of conservative-party members" published a letter against its own president. By October 24, 1937, when the PC held a plenary meeting at Lucifer Cinema in Dudești, G. Budișteanu was concurrently head of the PC branch in the Black (Second) Sector and General Secretary of the national body. In that same meeting, Filipescu demanded that the state mobilize its resources against antisemitic agitation. While he acknowledged the theoretical existence of a "Jewish Question", Filipescu remained committed to non-violence and spoke of Jews as "siblings of another race". Filipescu also warned that manifestos by the "so-called far-right movements [...] affirm a new expropriation", and acknowledged that the PNL's return to power, with Tătărescu, had been a better alternative; Perșinaru underscored that the party was committed to peaceful methods, while Periețeanu discussed the importance of economic stances, and the coming irrelevancy of political doctrines.

Around that time, Filipescu, Averescu and Cantacuzino were involved in secret talks to create a right-wing monarchist "national union" around the PNC; that projected government coalition would have also involved the PȚR and the Georgists. Filipescu declared his skepticism with such dealings and favored the PNȚ, demanding a transitional but "authoritarian" government under the PNȚ's Ion Mihalache; this solution, he argued, could reinforce public order and shield the country's minorities from persecution. However, as running mates in the general elections of December 1937, Filipescu's Conservatives closely followed the Maniu party line, which brought them into a "non-aggression pact" with the Guard. After various disputes, Filipescu was granted the third position on a PNȚ Bucharest list for the Assembly, which was headlined by Maniu.

The PC was effectively banned in early 1938 by Carol, along with all other political groups. It formally existed until March 15, when Filipescu suspended its activities indefinitely, citing the international situation as his rationale. This claim was ridiculed by the National Christian Țara Noastră, which noted that the Conservatives had become inconsistent, "useless and ridiculous." Epoca survived until July 15, 1938, closing down due to a combination of censorship and financial hurdles. In August, Filipescu died after failed surgery to treat his heart condition. Carol set up his own National Renaissance Front, as a catch-all single-party of the Romanian state. In January 1939, it had recruited Lecca (who came in through the Crusade of Romanianism) and Perșinaru. By August, Missir and Rosetti Bălănescu were both serving as general secretaries in the Ministry of National Economy. During World War II, the National Legionary State, established by Antonescu and the Iron Guard following Carol's ouster, was again able to count on Mareș, who served as its Minister of Agriculture—but without joining the Guard. Also recovered politically, Hagi-Moscu was made prefect in Buzău County in September 1940, in which capacity he attended General Epure's funeral in October.

After Antonescu chased out the Guardists and took power for himself, Hagi-Moscu was preserved as a government asset, and served as Deputy Mayor of Bucharest. During the Antonescu years, in October 1942, Benvenisti insulted censors in his private mail, which was then forwarded to the prosecutor's office, resulting in his sentencing to a one-month jail term. After the anti-fascist coup of August 1944, the cabinet of Nicolae Rădescu reportedly used Mareș's expertise by assigning him to a committee on land reform. He was arrested at some point after Rădescu's fall in March 1945, and brought before a People's Tribunal, where his participation in Iron Guard intrigues was a subject of investigation. In May 1946, Mareș was sentenced to a 10-year term in prison, as a war criminal. Hagi-Moscu was identified as an "Antonescian" or "known fascist", and was unable to find employment: in December 1945, the staff of Brâncovenesc Hospital asked for him to be expelled from his position of caretaker.

Under the Romanian communist regime, formally established in 1948, political persecution targeted Cerchez—he was arrested in January 1952, and, in 1953, was sentenced to 20 years of hard labor for grand treason; released during an amnesty in 1964, he lived in France from 1970 to his death in 1982. The anticommunist exile community had been joined in the early 1950s by Vișan, derided in the communist press at home as a "loyal conservative", a plagiarist, and a spy. The defunct party enjoyed more favor after the rise of national communism, when Filipescu's anti-fascism got him included on spurious lists "of those who contributed, evidently without so wishing, to the legitimizing of the communist regime". The LVȚ and the PNȚ's Voinici were still referred to as "fascist or fascist-type organizations" in a 1977 lecture by Ion Ardeleanu. That year, a similar verdict by Al. Gh. Savu was disputed by historian Ioan Scurtu, "given [the Conservative Party's] anti-fascist attitude and Grigore Filipescu's positioning against King Carol II's dictatorial tendencies."

== Electoral history ==
=== Legislative elections ===
Election	Votes	%	Assembly	Senate	Position
1931	Part of the National Union				
1932	18,643	0.6	0 / 387	0 / 113	15th
1933	47,114	1.6	0 / 387	3 / 108	10th
1937		under 0.5	0 / 387	0 / 113	
