= Ion Valentin Anestin =

Romanian artist and writer

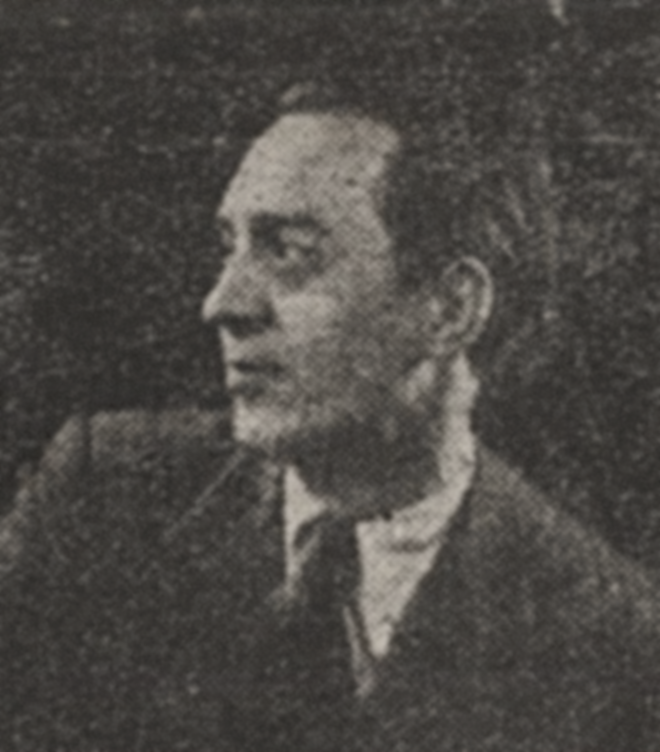
- Anestin in 1937
- Born: December 24, 1900; Bucharest
- Died: December 6, 1963 (aged 62)
- Education: Franz Storck, Arthur Verona
- Known for: caricature, engraving, painting, sculpting

Anestin's drawing of Ion Ion

Ion Valentin Anestin (December 24, 1900 – December 6, 1963) was a Romanian graphic artist, engraver, painter, sculptor, journalist and dramatist. Noted as a caricaturist and art critic, he was the father of Ion Nuni Anestin, himself a visual artist and actor.

== Biography ==
Born in Bucharest to a family originating from Craiova, he was the son of Theodor Anestin, a draftsman employed by the Bucharest Mayor's Office, and the grandson of Ion Anestin, an actor noted for his friendship with the dramatist Ion Luca Caragiale. One of his uncles, Victor, was an astronomer, and another, Alexandru, a journalist. In 1918–1920, he attended the Bucharest Fine Arts Academy, where he was taught by the sculptor Franz Storck, and then moved on to the Free Art Academy, founded by painter Arthur Verona.

After 1921, Anestin became a theater and art gallery chronicler, while authoring various theater plays. It was during the period that he also became noted for his satirical cartoons and portraits, heavily influenced by the French school of drawing. Together with writer Mircea Eliade, Ion Valentin Anestin published the magazine Est-Vest, which was established in 1927 and ceased its existence after only a couple of issues.

In 1928, he joined Vladimir Donescu on the staff of Vremea, editing its theater and art page between 1931 and 1943, while being responsible for the journal's graphic design. In parallel, Anestin contributed to a large number of newspapers and magazines (including Epoca, Adevărul Literar și Artistic, Timpul, Gluma, Cuvântul Liber, and the Romanian Communist Party's Bluze Albastre), and became a trend-setter in graphic art for the entire interwar period. Noted for his left-wing convictions, he drew individual and group satirical portraits of major figures of his day, both Romanian (Nicolae Titulescu, Alexandru Averescu, Lucian Blaga, Ion Inculeț, Ion Mihalache, Iuliu Maniu, Gheorghe Tătărescu, Octavian Goga) and foreign (Adolf Hitler, Benito Mussolini, and Joseph Stalin). Additionally, Anestin was known for his original creation, the character Ion Ion, a staple of his work during the 1930s. Ion Ion was depicted as a young man with a top hat or a bowler hat, carrying an umbrella, but having no shirt and trousers.

During World War II, beginning a month before the Soviet occupation of Bessarabia and Northern Bukovina and continuing throughout Romania's alliance with the Axis powers (see Romania during World War II), Anestin's work centered on denouncing Stalin and the Soviet Union, in a series titled Măcelarul din Piața Roșie ("The Red Square Butcher") published by the magazine Gluma. Following the start of Soviet occupation, the artist was barred from publishing by the censorship apparatus for a five-year period (1944–1949), and ultimately imprisoned. He died soon after his release.

== Selected filmography ==
- Mihail, câine de circ (1979)
