= Batiștei Church =

Orthodox church in Bucharest, Romania

- Biserica Batiștei
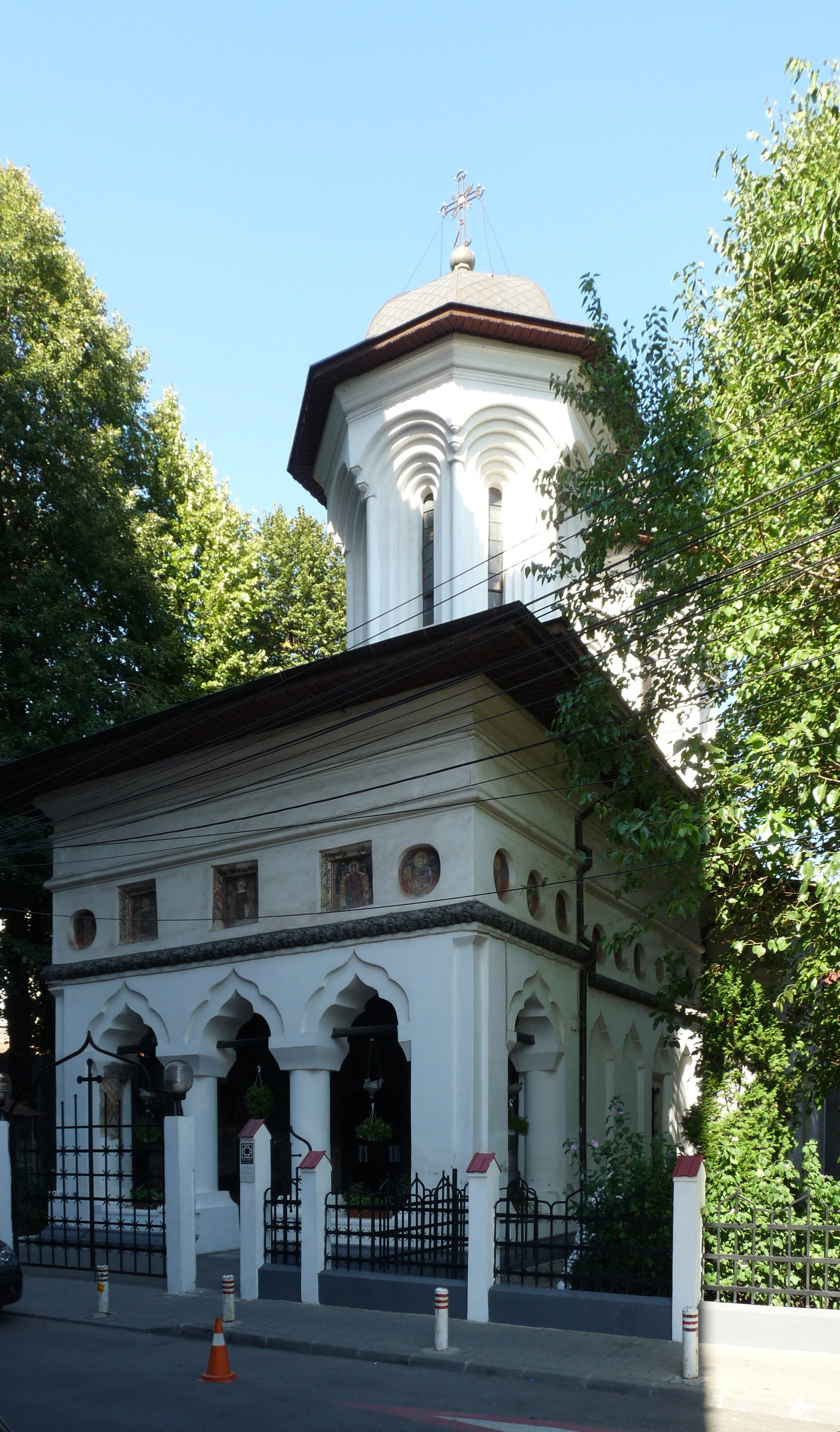
- Batiștei Church
- 44.4390°N 26.1047°E
- Location: 21 Batiștei Street, Sector 2, Bucharest
- Country: Romania
- Denomination: Eastern Orthodox
- Website: www.bisericabatistei.ro

Architecture
- Functional status: active
- Completed: 1763

Batiștei Church (Romanian: Biserica Batiștei) is a Romanian Orthodox church located at 21 Batiștei Street, Bucharest, Romania.

== History ==
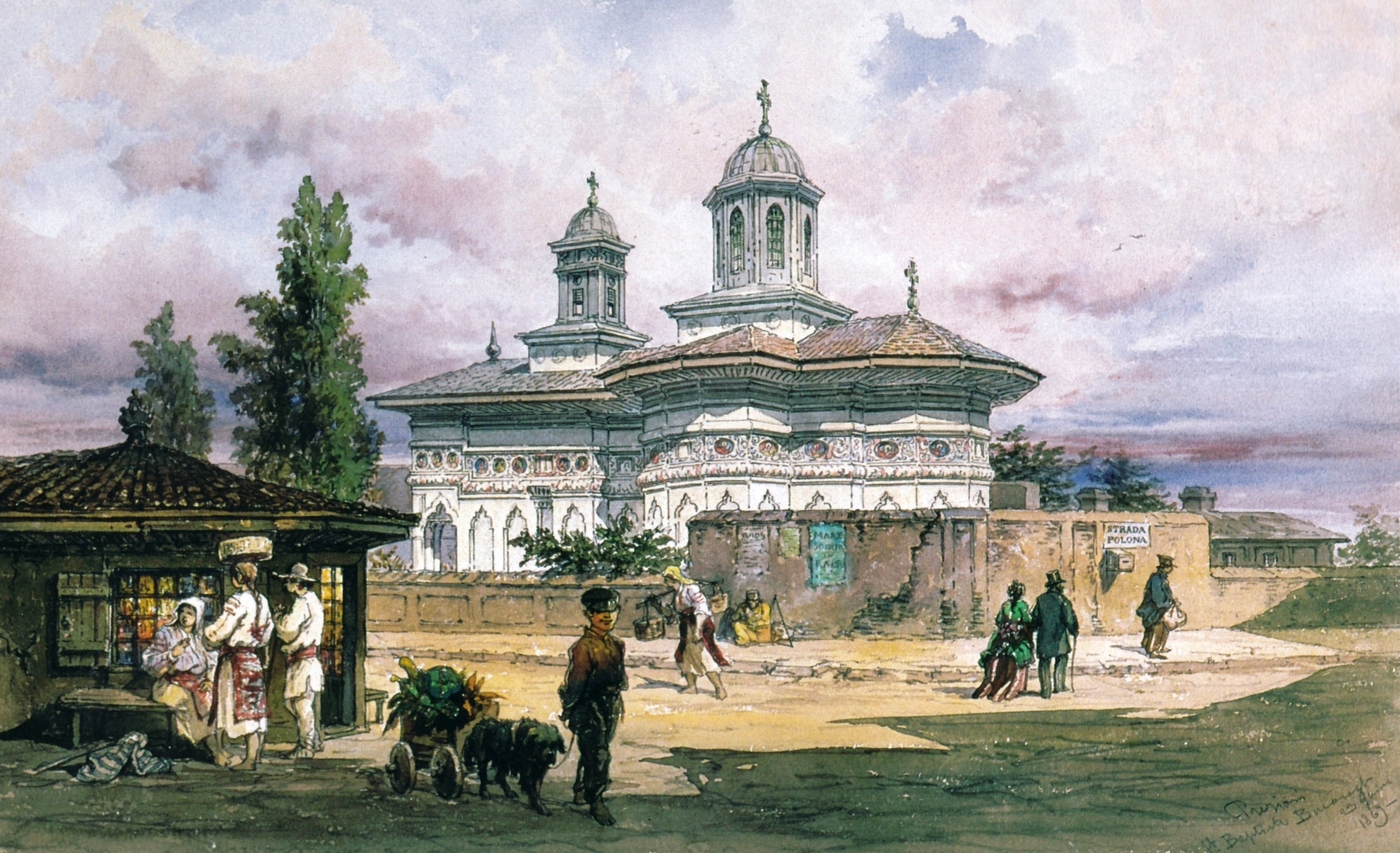
Watercolor by Domenico Preziosi (1869)

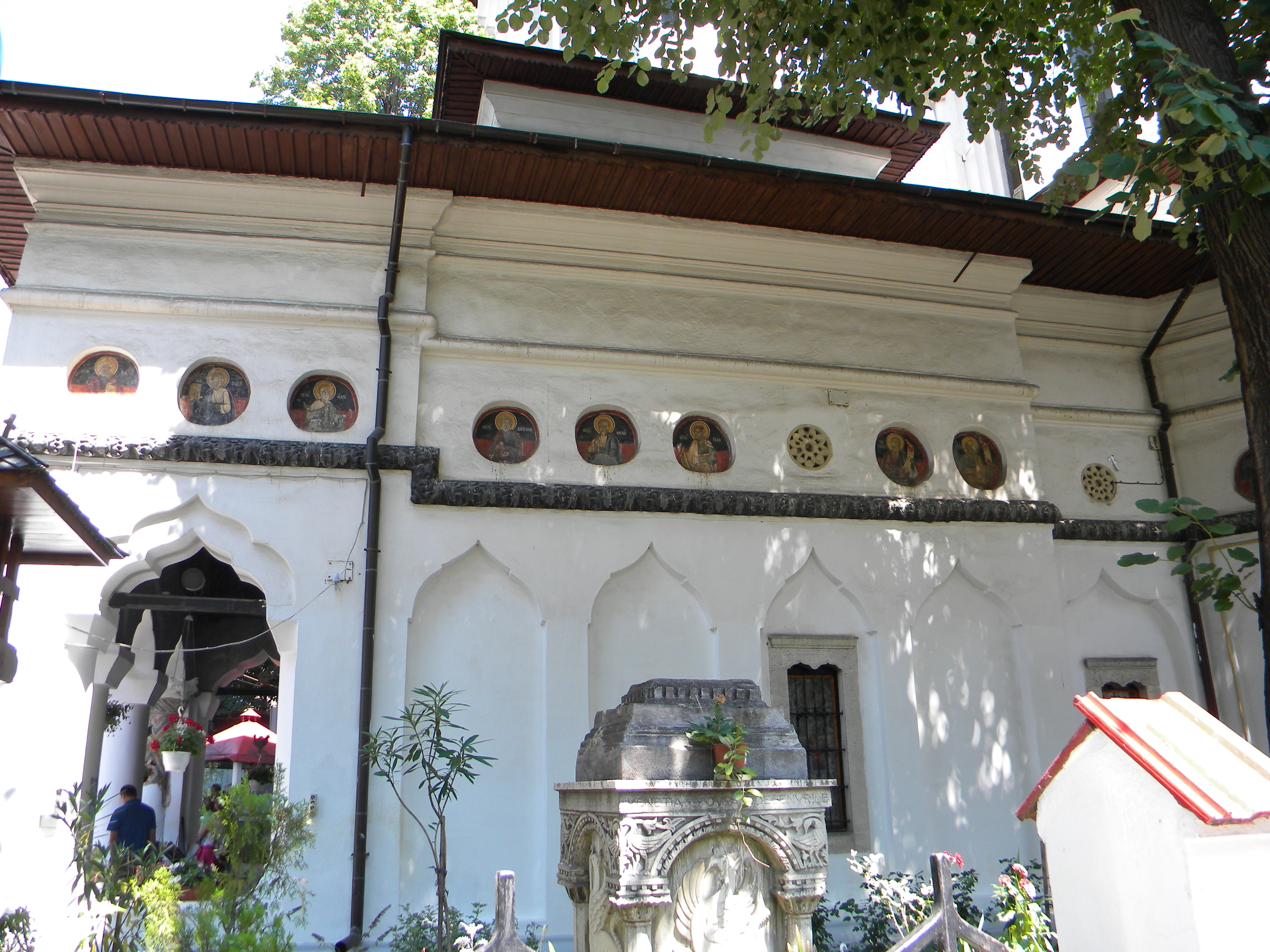
Side view

On the site of the present church or immediately nearby, an earlier church with the same name was built under Matei Basarab (1632–1654), first mentioned in a document of 1660. According to Nicolae Iorga, the name comes from Baptista Vevelli (Romanianized as Batiște), influential adviser to Radu Mihnea and possible ktitor. Another theory holds that a cattle grazing area in the vicinity was beaten down (bătătorit) by their hooves, and that this designation produced the name for the surrounding neighborhood and its church. Bucharest was hit by an earthquake in 1738 and by a fire the following year; it is possible that the first church was destroyed at the time.

In 1763, Manciu, vătaf (overseer) of butchers, together with his family and other locals, financed a new stone church in place of the previous wooden one, as attested by a carved dedication above the entrance. Construction began that July and finished in October, as indicated by the dedications: to Saint Anne (July 25), Paraskevi of Rome (July 26), and Parascheva of the Balkans (October 14). In a break with tradition, the ktitors are not painted on the walls, but after his death in 1766, Manciu was buried in the vestibule in the spot reserved for church founders.

The earliest image of the church dates to 1813; the ink drawing, by a jacket maker and choir singer, shows a tall wooden fence and two cupolas apparently of stone. The same year, Calinic of Cernica was ordained a priest there. The church's first record book is from 1844. It mentions that the attached cells were occupied by priests as well as poor people, orphans and widows. It notes that the iconostasis is of wood, the murals old, the seven windows framed in stone, the wooden door plated with iron, and the cupolas and roof made of rather old fir boards. A similar work from 1850 reveals that the domes were coated in tin, indicating the structure was growing weaker in the wake of the 1838 earthquake. In 1869, Italian painter Domenico Preziosi executed a fine watercolor of the church; however, by around 1880, it was in a deplorable state. Repairs were carried out in 1883, but these only further damaged the structure.

In 1905–1906, the iconostasis was gilt and its icons framed in silver, the murals were washed, new choirs were installed, stained glass was put in and the yard was fenced in. It was only in 1929–1930 that more ambitious repairs were carried out, based on the Preziosi painting. The domes were rebuilt, large amounts of added masonry were removed, the new vestibule was separated from the old, and in 1940, the murals were again cleaned. In 1938, during renovations, important original elements were found buried under mortar. The latest major repair work took place in the 1990s.

== Description ==
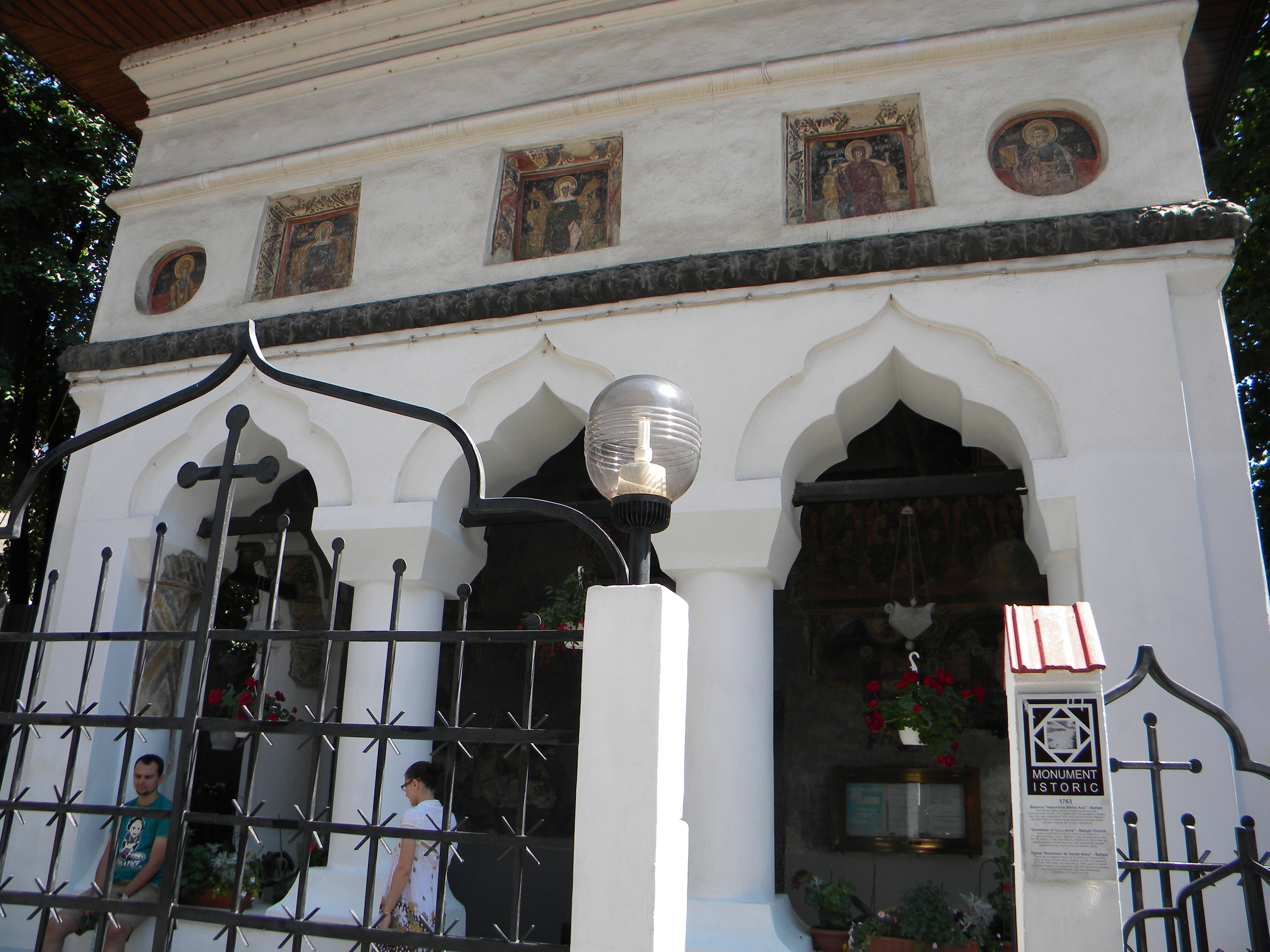
Close-up of façade

A typical example of Romanian architecture from the later 18th century, the church has an exterior divided by a horizontal stone border. There are arches below, while above sit five medallion icons: Saints Peter and Paul on the sides, and the three patron saints in the center. Unusually, the latter are square in shape. The painting is largely original, from 1763. Half the portico depicts a blessing Infant Jesus in mural form, surrounded by ten medallions of apostles and by the Four Evangelists. The arches are painted with five faces of saints, while plant motifs emphasize the folk influence. The main subject of the other half is John the Baptist; the Last Judgment is also shown. Lower down, there are portraits of the two Paraskevis.

In the vestibule, subjects include the Virgin Mary with Jesus and canonized monks. The main themes of the nave paintings are the miracles of Jesus and the Passion. Done in Byzantine style, it reflects the abundant ornamentation popular during the Phanariote era. The unknown artist of 1763 was talented, introducing personal elements, creating memorable portraits with distinct expressions, rich colors and a variety of nuances. The iconostasis and royal doors are carved in wood. The patron saints' icon, from 1833, shows Saint Anne in the center and the Paraskevis on either side.

Two large silver icons depicting Jesus and Mary were brought from the chapel of Dionisie Lupu. There are two imperial seats, one for the Patriarch and one for the King, carved in rosewood in the Horezu area. A mulberry tree dating to the early 18th century grows in the churchyard. The church is listed as a historic monument by Romania's Ministry of Culture and Religious Affairs.
