= Camarilla =

Group of royal favourites

A camarilla is a group of courtiers or favourites who surround a king or ruler. Usually, they do not hold any office or have any official authority at the royal court but influence their ruler behind the scenes. Consequently, they also escape having to bear responsibility for the effects of their advice. The term derives from the Spanish word camarilla (diminutive of cámara), meaning 'little chamber' or private cabinet of the king. It was first used of the circle of cronies around Spanish King Ferdinand VII (reigned 1814–1833). The term involves what is known as cronyism. The term also entered other languages like Polish, German and Greek, and is used in the sense given above.

A similar concept in modern politics is that of a Kitchen Cabinet, which is often composed of unelected advisers bypassing traditional governance practices.

== Examples ==
=== Germany ===
In particular, two groups are called camarillas: those who surrounded the Emperor Wilhelm II and the President Paul von Hindenburg. The influence of Hindenburg's camarilla is considered to be one of many factors behind the fall of the Weimar Republic, especially given his advanced age (Hindenburg was 78 years old at the time of his first election, and 85 years old at the time of his second).

- Oskar von Hindenburg, the son of the President
- Otto Meissner, secretary of state, chief of the presidential office
- General Kurt von Schleicher, head of the military office in the Defence Ministry, later Chancellor
- Franz von Papen, Chancellor

=== Romania ===
==== The camarilla of Queen Marie ====
- Barbu Știrbey, prince and lover of the queen

==== The camarilla of King Carol II ====
- Magda Lupescu, mistress and later wife of King Carol II
- Puiu Dumitrescu, private secretary of King Carol II (earlier period)
- Barbu Ionescu, businessman
- Hugo Bacher
- Nae Ionescu, philosopher and journalist (1930–1933)
- Gavrilă Marinescu, Bucharest police prefect
- Ernest Urdăreanu, secretary of King Carol II (later period)
- Max Auschnitt, industrialist
- Nicolae Malaxa, industrialist
- Aristide Blank, industrialist
- Mihai Moruzov, head of the Romanian Secret Intelligence Service

=== Russia ===
In the 19th century, Russia's government was frequently described as a "camarilla", starting as early as 1860. This usage remained common into the 20th century; for instance, in 1917, commentator Robert Machray wrote of "certain forces in the background of the political life of Russia known as the 'Camarilla', which exercised and still exercise an extraordinary influence".

=== Spain ===
The right-wing domestic circle with which Francisco Franco surrounded himself with in his final years at the Royal Palace of El Pardo, his official residence, has been referred to as a "camarilla" by multiple authors.

==== The "El Pardo" camarilla of Francisco Franco ====
- Cristóbal Martínez-Bordiú, son-in-law of Franco
- Carmen Polo, wife of Franco
- Vicente Gil García, personal physician to Franco
- José Ramón Gavilán, head of Franco's personal military staff
- Antonio Urcelay Rodríguez, naval aide to Franco
- Felipe Polo Martínez-Valdés, brother-in-law and personal lawyer of Franco

== Other ==
- "Camarilla" is also the name of a "sect" (faction) in the role-playing game Vampire: The Masquerade.
- The Camarilla is a multi-planetary, multi-species secret organization intent on keeping Earth isolated from the rest of the galaxy in Brian Daley's "Fitzhugh & Floyt" trilogy.
- The Camarilla is a multi-planetary, multi-species secret organization with varied and often obscure motives in Lisanne Norman's Sholan Alliance.
- The Camarilla is an ancient, secret organization of witch hunters in the American TV show Motherland: Fort Salem.

== See also ==
- Privy Council
- Cabal
- Courtier
- Royal court
- Cabal Ministry
- Cliveden set
- Éminence grise
- Power behind the throne
- The School of Night
- Makhzen
- Imperial Preceptor
