= Aristide Blank =

Romanian banker and playwright (1883–1960)

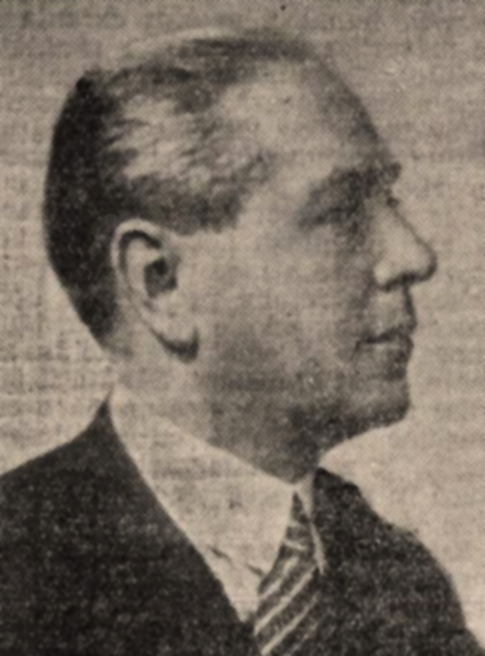
- Blank in 1934
- Born: January 1, 1883; Bucharest, Kingdom of Romania
- Died: January 1, 1960 (aged 77); Paris, France
- Education: University of Bucharest
- Occupations: Investor, business magnate, lawyer, patron of the arts, humanitarian, playwright
- Years active: c. 1900–1953
- Spouse(s): Marietta Culoglu (divorced) Ecaterina Caragiale (div.); Cella Delavrancea (div.); Vota Vesnić (m. 1935)
- Father: Mauriciu Blank
- Relatives: Emanoil Culoglu (father-in-law); Ion Luca Caragiale (father-in-law; posth.); Mateiu Caragiale (brother-in-law); Barbu Ștefănescu Delavrancea (father-in-law; posth.); Milenko Radomar Vesnić (father-in-law; posth.)

Aristide or Aristid Blank, also spelled Blanc or Blanck (January 1, 1883 – January 1, 1960), was a Romanian financier, economist, arts patron and playwright. His father, Mauriciu Blank, an assimilated and naturalized Romanian Jew, was manager of the Marmorosch Blank Bank (BMB), a major financial enterprise. Aristide took up jobs within the same company, and introduced various new ideas for development with a series of pamphlets. He was drafted as a junior officer in the Second Balkan War and again in World War I, though he did not see action during the latter; instead, he advanced causes related to Romanian nationalism, as well as his own agenda, in the Russian Republic, in the Far East, and eventually in France. He also began expanding BMB investments, branching out into maritime transport and founding CFRNA/CIDNA airlines. This period witnessed his attempt at setting up a press empire around the twin dailies Adevărul and Dimineața, and his brief engagement with Epoca.

Inheriting his father's position at the BMB, Blank expanded its activities and expenditures, setting aside money for graft, and allowing his staff to engage in accounting fraud. By 1923, he was sponsoring nationalist propaganda writings, working alongside historians Nicolae Iorga and Vasile Pârvan, as well as advocating for a regime of free trade. He set up his own publishing house, Cultura Națională, and a literary agency, which was for a while managed by philosopher Nae Ionescu—ultimately sacked by Blank upon the discovery of embezzlement. Blank, who allegedly alternated mainstream politics with support for the far-left, found himself pitted against the antisemitic far-right, being brutalized by the National Christian Defense League and marked for retribution by the Iron Guard.

Beginning in the early 1920s, Blank cultivated Crown Prince Carol, who took over as King of Romania after a 1930 coup. Emerging as Carol's economic adviser, Blank joined the resulting camarilla, an affiliation which shielded him from the consequences of BMB mismanagement. The enterprise crashed in 1931, unable to absorb the effects of the Great Depression. Blank was removed from his managerial position following intervention by the National Bank of Romania, but used political channels to preserve some measure of control, and was instrumental in toppling National Bank Governor Mihail Manoilescu, who did not wish to refinance the BMB. His influence fluctuated for the remainder of Carol's reign; still unable to fully control the BMB, he still owned Discom, a lucrative retailer for products of state monopolies. In the 1930s, he helped develop Eforie and Techirghiol into summer resorts.

Public antisemitism and fascism took the forefront during the late years of Carlism and the early years of World War II. This period saw Blank marginalized, and resulted in additional scrutiny of the BMB affair, at the end of which he was sentenced to pay 600 million lei in damages. Blank reemerged as BMB manager after King Michael's Coup of 1944, but he and his business were finally repressed by the communist regime from 1948. In 1953, he was sentenced to 20 years for high treason, but managed to have that verdict overturned in 1955. After international pressures, he was allowed to emigrate in 1958, and lived his final months in Paris. His children from his successive marriages and affairs include American soldier Milenko Blank and French press magnate Patrice-Aristide Blank.

== Biography ==
=== Early life ===
Born in Bucharest on the first day of 1883 (New Style: January 13), Aristide was the son of Mauriciu Blank. Through his paternal lineage, he belonged to the Sephardi minority within the local Jewish community, and was distantly related to linguist Moses Gaster. His clan, originally known as Derrera el Blanco, had first settled in Wallachia during the 18th century, but their Judaism prevented them from obtaining naturalization. Martinho de Brederode, Portuguese ambassador to Romania in 1920, described Aristide as the first Jew to have ever made his way into Romania's high society. By then, the family's ethnic background was still largely unknown to the Romanian public, with the Jewish publication Mântuirea noting in 1920 that Aristide was of "obscure origin". As reported in 1924 by L'Univers Israélite, he was fully assimilated, "Jewish only in origin"; the same year, Opinia newspaper assessed that Blank was "a Semite seen by other Jews as a renegade [...] assimilated to the point of exhibiting all Romanian vices, [and] the parent of Romanian Christian children". In the early 1910s, the junior banker reportedly endorsed Radu D. Rosetti's movement in support of cremation.

Around 1880, Mauriciu was entering the financial elite of the newly established Principality of Romania, having served as head of the Marmorosch Blank Bank (BMB) since 1874. At the time of Aristide's birth, it was the most powerful private bank in the fledgling Romanian Kingdom. Blank's political friend and enemy, Constantin Argetoianu, claims that Mauriciu had a marriage of convenience to Aristide's mother Betina Goldenberg, who was "ugly as well as vulgar, avaricious as well as venomous". She was contrarily described by her Rabbi, Jacob Itzhak Niemirower, as "pious" in her Judaism, "a symbol of the Hebrew concept of life [as] both festive and holy." One of Aristide's sisters was married off to another financier, Adalbert Csillag, who would experience complete bankruptcy. Another sister, Margot, married industrialist Herman Spayer, whose residence on Batiștei Street was briefly used by the BMB. The family finally received Romanian citizenship in 1883, shortly after Aristide's birth.

According to a hostile note by French journalist Jean Mourat, Blank Jr was "raised in luxury, so as to keep up with good traditions." Aristide received an elite education, and was possessed of an artistic sensibility; however, Argetoianu portrays him as "highly intelligent [but] lacking a serious culture", his main attributes being ambition, jealousy, and eventually paranoia. He became a published poet in his teenage years. In 1899 Foaia Populară put out his debut poem, Bătrâna; this was followed in April 1900 by Despărțire, a pastiche from Eduard von Feuchtersleben that he signed as "Aristide Blanc", also in Foaia Populară in April 1900. Blank took a graduation diploma from the University of Bucharest Faculty of Law and Philosophy. His first career from 1904 was as a lawyer affiliated with the bar association of Bucharest.

In February 1905, Blank's translations of poems by Mihai Eminescu into German saw print in the Czernowitzer Allgemeine Zeitung. He experimented in other fields as well: in March 1905, he played violin for attendees of a BMB banquet; he was also interested in automobiles, and in early 1908 was issued license plate "118", as one of Romania's first registered car-owners. He had spent most of 1905 undergoing specialization at banks in the City of London, and had been appointed branch subdirector at the BMB. In late 1906, he had also toured the Aromanian communities in Salonica vilayet, donating 1,500 lei for the upkeep of their schools. In October 1908, he announced his engagement to Marietta Culoglu, daughter of politician Emanoil Culoglu, the "distinguished nationalist", and herself noted as an activist for women's suffrage. As argued by Culoglu's critics, their relationship was engineered by Alexandru C. Constantinescu of the National Liberal Party (PNL), who thus obtained Blank as an asset for his clique. Aristide and Marietta were wed in January 1909, during a civil ceremony attended by Vintilă Brătianu, Emil Costinescu, and Vasile Morțun. In June of that year, he became a Knight of the Order of the Crown of Romania.

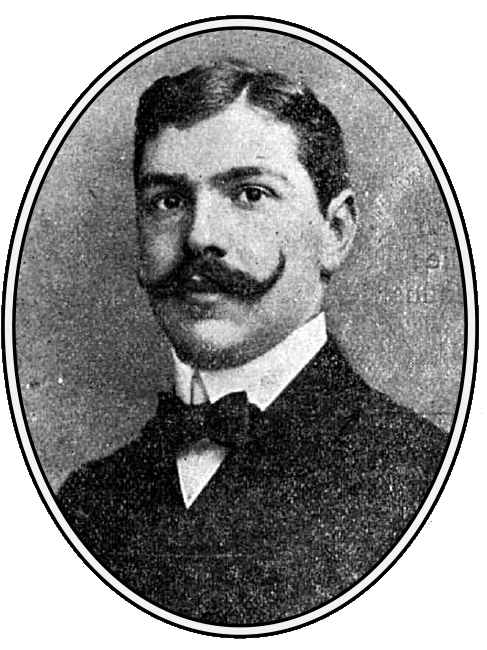
Blank in 1910

After giving up his law practice, Blank Jr closely followed his father's career in finance. By 1910, he was providing free lessons in political economy for the benefit of BMB employees, and also serving on the board of directors for various BMB branches, including Moldova Bank of Iași and the Aromanian Bank of Commerce. He was inducted into the Order of Commercial and Industrial Merit in 1912, when he also served on the committee to establish the Bucharest Academy of Economic Studies. In June 1913, Blank was blackmailed by Seara newspaperman Alexandru Bogdan-Pitești, who had inaugurated a smear campaign against the BMB. According to notes left by Seara's Mateiu Caragiale, Blank "trapped" Bogdan-Pitești with direct support from the Romanian Police. This refers to a sting operation at Flora Restaurant, where Blank heard Bogdan-Pitești and his associate Adolf Davidescu state their demands while policemen were standing by. Obtaining legal assistance from Take Ionescu, Blank took Bogdan-Pitești to court and won, resulting in his rival's imprisonment. A month after, Romania entered the Second Balkan War, with Blank enlisted as a Land Forces officer in Southern Dobruja. It was here that he first met historian and politician Nicolae Iorga, with whom he would cooperate on cultural ventures in the early 1920s.

=== World War I ===
Upon the expedition's end, Blank Jr helped to establish and finance two BMB naval transport enterprises—respectively operating on the Black Sea and the Danube. In the winter of 1914–1915, he was sent to the United Kingdom by Ion I. C. Brătianu's PNL government, in order to secure a loan for the state, establishing neutral Romania's closer ties to the Triple Entente. He and George Danielopolu also formed a two-man delegation to the United States, reaching New York City in early December 1914. This mission caused much controversy at home: Foreign Minister Emanoil Porumbaru refused to sign his name to the deal, believing that it compromised Romania's policy of non-alignment; Porumbaru was consequently forced to resign. Upon his return, Blank debuted in economic theory with a tract on pricing policies, Scumpirea și ieftinirea traiului ("Increases and Decreases in the Cost of Living", Bucharest, 1915–1916); his ideas on this topic inspired banking clerks to set up a consumers' co-operative. During June 1915, he was involved in the grain trade out of Brăila, and criticizing the administration for imposing caps on the exports of foodstuffs. In September, he served as executive of an anonymous partnership for the manufacture and sale of ammunition. This had been established by his father with participation from Culoglu, Alexandru Kirițescu, and Mihail Săulescu. As reported by Argetoianu, Blank Jr still had connections in the German Empire, which he used to plant his protege Felix Wieder in a German consortium—a position which Wieder then used to defraud that firm.

The Treaty of Bucharest brought Romania into the war as an Entente ally, then its invasion by Germany. Again drafted as a Lieutenant, Blank enlisted in the Romanian Air Corps. He was subsequently spotted at Iași, the provisional capital of a rump Romanian state. Argetoianu reports that wartime Iași was where Blank first earned the trust of Carol of Hohenzollern, the disgraced Romanian Crown Prince. Carol used Blank in his attempts to earn support from Prime Minister Alexandru Averescu. Also according to Argetoianu, Blank was also faking asthma attacks, which saw him relieved of his duties and sent to Paris. One report by Alexandru Lapedatu suggests that Blank transited through Moscow, in the Russian Republic, where he personally witnessed the November Revolution. He was evicted "by some Englishmen" during the Red Guards' attack on Hotel Metropol. During the exodus of 1917, Blank arrived on a special mission to Vladivostok; from this outpost, he sponsored Ioan Timuș's extended trip to Japan, asking him to act as an informant on Japanese cultural norms, and "therefore of use to our country". Blank himself lived for a while in the Shanghai International Settlement. As recalled by fellow expatriate businessman Gheorghe Pallade, he was engaged in currency speculation, and paraded through the French Concession in an automobile decked in Romanian tricolors. According to this report, Blank, who still wore his officer's uniform, was "terribly enraged" when a Chinese Jew sent him a gift of matzah, seemingly because it exposed his ethnic heritage.

By his own account, Blank was in Republican China when Romania sued for peace with Germany in early 1918. In October 1918, he sailed across the Indian Ocean, the Red Sea, and into Europe, ultimately reaching France; he had intended to join the French Army, but his services were no longer required after the Armistice of November. He remained in French territory after that date, working primarily as a propagandist and financier for Romanian nationalist causes. Historian Orest Tafrali identifies Blank and Paul Brătășanu as the two main backers of La Roumanie newspaper, which campaigned for the creation of a Greater Romania. Before the end of 1918, Blank was allegedly in Nice, alongside Octavian Goga, the Transylvanian poet-activist. Goga returned in 1919 to his native region, which had been newly united with Romania, with a check for 100,000 kronen, donated for the establishment of Romanian-language libraries. By early 1920, Blank was also networking with pro-Allied nationalists from both the Old Kingdom and Transylvania, including Take Ionescu and Alexandru Vaida-Voevod. Vaida's private correspondence notes that Ionescu, Blank and Constantinescu were colluding to bring the former in as Prime Minister, which required them to manipulate the market against the national interest—a "solidarity of bandits". Lapedatu also claims that Blank, rather than acting as a philanthropist, recovered all the money he had lent to Romanian politicians in 1918–1920.

Before the Armistice, Blank had visited the Société des Avions Bernard, which were creating a bomber plane capable of reaching Berlin. In the aftermath, he calculated that the same investment could be used to create airline services between Paris and Bucharest. In December 1918, he also published in La Renaissance his own project for a Greater Romania, which he depicted as an economic boon for the Allied cause. Blank envisaged the Danube as a commercial highway for Romanian grain and timber, but noted that its success relied on the internationalization of the Turkish Straits. According to diplomat Nicolae Petrescu-Comnen, Blank was one of the "men of culture" and "patriots" who personally assisted him in countering the propaganda put out by the Hungarian Republic, which vied with Romania for control of Transylvania. In 1919, when he was decommissioned as a Captain in the Second Cavalry Regiment, Blank put out the first volume of an illustrated propaganda album, La Roumanie en images. Iorga viewed it as a superior work of art, but noted that its selection of prints displayed "banality" and a "lack of familiarity with all newer discoveries regarding Romania's past". After reading his comments, Blank employed Iorga as his editorial adviser. The following year, he sponsored French editions from Iorga's own works: Histoire des Roumains et de leur civilisation and Anthologie de la littérature roumaine. Lapedatu recounts that, in doing so, Blank saved the former book from being shelved by Hachette.

=== Social rise ===
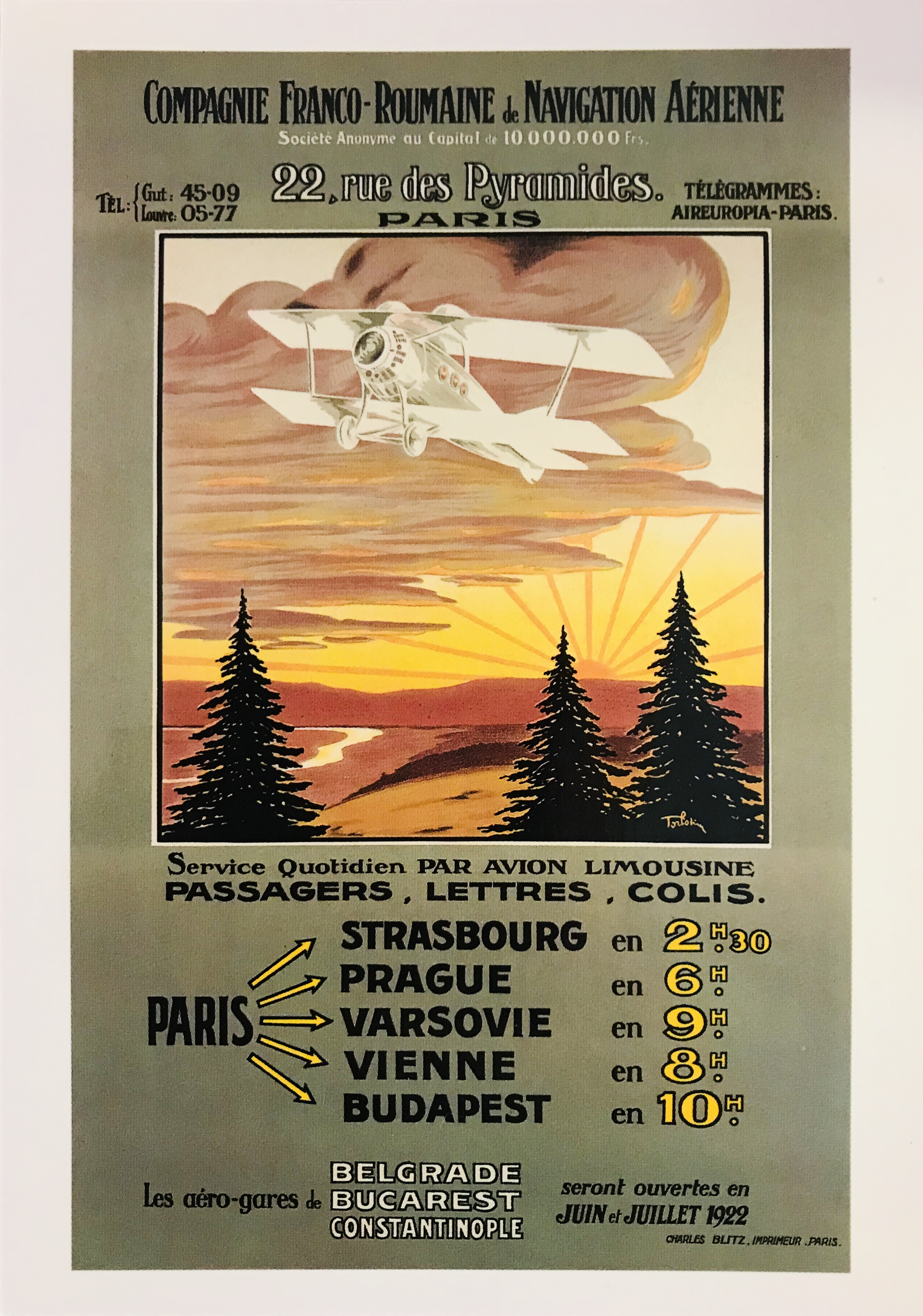
1922 advertisement for CFRNA flights

At some point before 1919, Blank consolidated his art collection by purchasing most of Nicolae Grigorescu's paintings in the Alexandru Vlahuță collection. He took painter Jean Alexandru Steriadi as his adviser, and finnced his wife Nora's ceramist workshop. Around 1920, he sparked controversy with his wholesale purchase of canvasses by Adam Bățatu and Sabin Popp, "without even looking over the paintings." By then, his profile in culture and politics was intertwined with his personal life. Around 1919, he was briefly married to Ecaterina Caragiale, daughter of the playwright Ion Luca Caragiale and Mateiu's half-sister. After a long courtship, he wed pianist Cella Delavrancea, orphaned daughter of writer Barbu Ștefănescu Delavrancea, at some point before April 1920. Cella called her husband Aladin, and noted that she fulfilled all her financial demands; with her new-found wealth, she funded her own literary club, called Maison d'Art. Their marriage ended in divorce. By then, Blank had fathered a son, Patrice-Aristide, reportedly born "Aristide Blank Satinover" or "Tuchner Satinover" to a French mother.

Following the establishment of Greater Romania, Aristide and Mauriciu sold BMB to a rival firm, but continued to hold controlling shares between them. Their businesses now branched out into aviation. In 1920, Aristide used BMB funds to set up CFRNA (later renamed CIDNA), alongside aviator Pierre de Fleurieu. Fleurieu had worked as a minor clerk at the bank, until Blank became aware of his fighter-pilot record and his belief in the future of civil aviation. Theirs was the first airline to offer a direct Paris–Bucharest flight, with an extension to Istanbul; the route was inaugurated by Albert Louis Deullin, with a landing at Pipera Airport in October 1921. According to Argetoianu, Blank also involved himself in setting up the Romanian Air Club, because doing so would bring him closer to Carol, himself an aviation enthusiast.

Blank had remained involved in debates related to postwar recovery of Romania, and of Europe at large. Before 1922, he authored an essay on Soviet Russia's New Economic Policy, which was hosted by John Maynard Keynes in the Manchester Guardian. It was read by Karl Polanyi, the Hungarian exile economist, who argued that, though an "excellent professional", Blank had greatly exaggerated the hurdles faced by Russia. Polanyi also criticized some of Blank's proposals (including the division of Russian territory as trade zones, and the creation of "huge warehouses" of foreign goods) as more like the science fiction of Jules Verne than scholarly proposal. In 1921, Blank had founded the BMB's General Building Society, which managed construction firms in Bucharest and Câmpina. Both Blanks also became involved in assisting humanitarian work by the American Jewish Joint Distribution Committee. This included a BMB loan for the reconstruction of Bukovina Jewish property, for which Blank offered a reduced interest.

Though a card-carrying member of the PNL, Blank was infuriated when his bank could not obtain a tax rebate of 35 million lei. In late 1920, Brederode noted that the BMB and Paribas both sponsored an effort to orient Romania toward free trade—a policy which was embraced by the Peasants' Party, the People's Party, and Ionescu's Conservative Democrats. When Averescu returned as Prime Minister of a People's Party cabinet in 1920, Blank helped it negotiate a four-year loan of 15 million French francs with Belgian bankers such as Lucien Kaisin. As reported by politician Alexandru Marghiloman, in early 1920 Blank Sr was already funding the Peasantists, whose leading member Ion Răducanu was a BMB employee. His son took up the same cause and, in 1921, was providing funds for Nicolae L. Lupu's Peasantist daily, Aurora. He then assisted the Peasantist-backed coalition in negotiating an international loan, which was to help Romania rebuild its internal market. As noted at the time by Furnica magazine, this mission could effectively turn Blank Jr against Brătianu and his supporters in the banking industry, since the PNL's policy was to prevent adversaries from "doing even the right thing".

Other journalists similarly sounded the alarm about the PNL's version of protectionism and its clashes with Blank's agenda. In a 1924 editorial, Opinia newspaper alleged that the PNL elite, including Constantin Angelescu, had stripped Blank of his leverage on government, and therefore had endangered Romania's ability to contract foreign loans: "[Blank] would have put us into contact with America's financial circles, namely those that, as it turns out, are currently calling the shots not just their own America, but also in Europe." By contrast, PNL doctrinaire Vintilă Brătianu viewed Blank as one who opposed attempts of rebuilding Romania's economy into a "national framework". The PNL's central organ, Viitorul, reported that, as the Conservative-Democratic Minister of Agriculture, Constantin Garoflid had leased 100,000 hectares of Romanian arable land to an investment firm, Progresul Agricol. According to this source, the latter was registered in Romania with Blank as its representative, but was merely the facade of a "foreign consortium". A lasting feud ensued between Blank and the National Liberals: by 1923, Blank has set himself the task of ensuring that the party never returned to power. The BMB was staffed exclusively with adversaries or dissidents of the PNL—including Goga, Vaida-Voevod, Constantinescu, and Nicolae Tabacovici.

In 1920, Blank set up a luxurious Romanian restaurant in Paris' Latin Quarter, which was for a while managed by sociologist Mihai Ralea. Having secured a contract for the transfer of scholarships for Romanian students in France, Blank also sponsored Iorga's Romanian School, created in 1922 at Fontenay-aux-Roses. As seen by historian Petre Țurlea, Iorga's relationship with Blank was "highly profitable for [Romanian] culture". It resulted in the establishment of a popular theater tied to Iorga's Cultural League for the Unity of All Romanians. According to historian Lucian T. Butaru, Iorga appreciated Blank's cultural endeavor, and this may have helped tone down his otherwise entrenched antisemitism. Blank also provided funds for Iorga's son Mircea to study abroad, which, Argetoianu claims, effectively meant that the Iorga family was in his debt; Iorga responded to such accusations, noting that his son was under no obligation to work for Blank.

=== Adevărul and literary circle ===
In addition to being a gifted orator, Blank still had literary pretensions. In 1922, he sponsored Armand Pascal and Benjamin Fondane's theater troupe, Insula. He himself debuted as a pseudonymous dramatist in Paris and Bucharest. According to Argetoianu, his work in the field was merely "idiotic", though Blank was admitted to the Romanian Dramatists' Society in 1930. In 1932, the celebrated critic George Călinescu published some positive remarks regarding Blank's work in the field—though, as noted by writer Florin Faifer, these were entirely conjectural. Faifer himself argues that Blank's contribution to literary modernism was affected by "snobbery", though not worthless. Such pieces include L'Assoiffé or Însetatul ("Thirst Man"), produced by Georges Pitoëff's company of Paris in 1925. Here, Blank depicts himself as the visionary misfit Andrei, whose promising destinity is cut short by a jealous husband. In 1920, Blank had also funded a literary club called Societatea Filarmonică. Also in 1920, Blank became the target of a renewed smear campaign, this time carried by Tudor Arghezi's Cronica. As reported by a Siguranța source, he solved this issue by presenting Arghezi with a gift of 100,000 lei, later supplemented by a monthly stipend; Arghezi would later complain that the banker had tried to humiliate him by forcing publishers not to engage with him. Blank had also agreed to sponsor Arghezi associate Gala Galaction, who asked for a grant of 160,000 lei in order to translate the Bible into Romanian. However, Galaction failed to keep up with the writing schedule. In 1921, Blank partly withdrew his support, and only advanced Galaction 36,000 lei for his version of the New Testament.

Blank had by then decided to begin direct investments in the publishing industry. By 1929, the BMB had acquired, and Blank himself was managing, four out of all six paper mills operating in Romania—respectively located at Câmpulung Moldovenesc, Petrești-Sebeș, Piatra Neamț, and Scăeni. During the preceding decade, he had founded or financed a series of cultural institutions of his own. These included Cultura Națională publishing house, which was established and named on Iorga's advice and offered lucrative employment to intellectuals such as Dimitrie Gusti and Vasile Pârvan. He "put out books that are not just neatly printed, but artistic; encouraging the authors and helping the readers, for these books are sold cheaper than the cost of production." Though Blank paid for the Viața Românească editorial office, by 1922 he was that enterprise's direct competitor. Viața Românească's director, Mihail Sadoveanu, complained that Blank's tactics at Cultura Națională were specifically designed to corner the publishing market. During those months, Blank was building up his a press empire of his own. He sponsored Grigore Filipescu, a BMB associate, helping him relaunch the conservative daily Epoca. He maintained some say in Epoca's editorial policy, preventing Liviu Rebreanu from publishing an article that was critical of Blank himself.

Blank purchased the left-wing dailies Adevărul and Dimineața, which became BMB and Cultura Națională assets. Reportedly, this investment cost him 7 million lei. The circumstances for Blank's takeover, whereby journalist Constantin Mille renounced his most valuable enterprise, were debated by the staff, and remain mysterious. Shortly thereafter, Mille used the money to launch another newspaper, Lupta, which competed with Blank's consortium and opened its offices just opposite. Mainly using Adevărul to air his polemics with the National Liberals at Viitorul, Blank immediately reassured its readers that the newspaper would remain a strong voice on the traditional left. However, an article in Contimporanul alleges that he personally sacked the caretaker editor, Emil Fagure, which also caused the resignation of another staff member, Barbu Brănișteanu. Management was then handled by militant Romanian journalist Constantin Graur and by Jewish entrepreneur Emil Pauker, who was coincidentally the uncle of a prominent communist, Marcel Pauker. Marghiloman reports that, in late 1921, Blank's conflict with the Brătianu faction had degenerated and upset Mauriciu's business arrangements, to a point where the BMB threatened to liquidate Adevărul assets. This reportedly caused Blank Jr to stop writing for his own newspaper.

As argued by Argetoianu, Blank purposefully spent his own money on far-leftist causes, so as to undermine the Romanian state. He claims to have personally intervened to have Mauriciu "put a leash" on Aristide, when the latter became involved with Philippe Ciprut in sponsoring the Socialist Party of Romania. In 1924, Blank resold Adevărul and Dimineața to Graur and other subordinate journalists, causing Mille to express his indignation in Lupta: "I had sold my newspapers to Mr Aristide Blank, a man of youth, of culture, of initiative, who had, in addition to his millions, the structure of an honest man, of a fighter for democracy and truth. I could not imagine that Mr Blank viewed Adevărul and Dimineața with the character and interest of a regular fella, as a commercial business that one just sells off to whomever". Pauker and his brother Simion took over more shares of Adevărul, which became widely perceived as their newspaper, and therefore as a "Jewish" enterprise.

Nicolae Carandino, at the time a young journalist, recalls that Blank, "having no administrative appointment and no title to his name", was unofficially recognized in government circles as the organizer of receptions for "any of the important foreignes who were visiting our country." According to memoirist and lawyer Petre Pandrea, he intended to take over as Minister of Finance, and for this reason surrounded himself with intellectuals such as Pârvan and Nae Ionescu. At Cultura Națională, he oversaw luxury editions from works by both Caragiales, possibly intended as homages to his former wife. Blank also took personal charge of the Economics Collection, which he then assigned to a specialist—Mihail Manoilescu, who used it to publish his own tract, Politica producției naționale ("The Policy of National Production"). Until 1923, Cultura Națională's printing offices put out the literary magazine Gândirea, managed by Cezar Petrescu and Nichifor Crainic. As reported by Crainic, this partnership broke down when Pârvan attempted to prevent them from hosting criticism of Blank. Also in 1923, Nae Ionescu purchased his Bucharest villa using an affordable credit obtained from the financier; a year later, Blank sponsored Constantin Daicoviciu's research at Ulpia Traiana Sarmizegetusa.

A rapprochement between Nae Ionescu and Blank began in 1922, when the former publicly praised the latter for endorsing dirigisme, to an even higher degree than the National Liberals. Ionescu was employed by Cultura Națională, but left after a public row with its patron. The issue of contention was Ionescu's fraudulent management of the Central Book Office, a literary agency and subsidiary of Cultura Națională, which allegedly brought Blank losses of 800,000 lei. As narrated by journalist Pamfil Șeicaru, Blank caught on only after attending Ionescu's lavish house-warming party, and later discovered that Ionescu had forged Pârvan and Gusti's signatures on the company's balance sheets. Blank shielded Ionescu from prosecution, but forced him to write a letter of confession. Photocopies of this were kept by all those whom Ionescu had defrauded, while Blank had the original, which he reportedly showed to Argetoianu after Ionescu made attempts to return as a politician.

=== Far-right attacks and Regency intrigues ===
Blank's involvement with youth and left-wing causes during the process of Jewish emancipation saw him engaged in a prolonged conflict with the antisemitic far-right, and in particular with Corneliu Zelea Codreanu, who would emerge as a regional leader of the National Christian Defense League (LANC). Codreanu first identified Blank as an enemy during the Student Congress of 1920, when he attempted to pass motions for religious discrimination; this was opposed by other youth leaders, whom Codreanu then accused of being Blank's agents. According to Carandino, around 1922 antisemitic students also heckled one of Blank's lectures on monetary policy, which was attended by Argetoianu, Vintilă Brătianu, Virgil Madgearu, and Grigore Iunian. Seemingly imperturbable, Blank carried own with his speech and his blackboard demonstration. Upon finishing, he left the hall though rows of "hooligans", "his back straight, his right arm on his shoulder"; his pose impressed the hecklers, and reduced the uproar.

In late 1923, police agents captured Codreanu, Ion Moța, and other LANC activists, accusing them of plotting to assassinate members of the Romanian political and financial elite, including the Blanks. Though cleared of the crime, Codreanu later acknowledged that he and Moța wished to rid Romania of those who had "corrupted all of Romania's parties and politicians", identifying Aristide as a leading sponsor of the National Peasants' Party (PNȚ). The latter rumor was replicated in other sources, with one unsigned denouncer claiming that the PNȚ's debt to the BMB ran higher than 30 million lei in 1930. In April 1924, at the height of a scandal involving Codreanu's arrest, LANC affiliates stormed into a hall where Blank Jr was lecturing on economic matters. During the attack, he sustained serious injuries of the skull, having allegedly been "pulled by the hair [...] and trampled upon." The assailants were put on trial, but acquitted.

A note in L'Univers Israélite claimed that the incident was in fact orchestrated by government, while Argetoianu believes that students in general genuinely detested Blank. The harassment continued over several years. In January 1925, Codreanu's student organizations again alleged that Blank was trafficking in influence through the Romanian universities, and used this issue as a rally call for a student strike. As part of their conflict with Iorga, Lăncieri youths openly confronted him, asking him why had "sold himself to banker Blank"; details about such contacts were popularized by LANC leader A. C. Cuza and by Madgearu, who had since joined the PNȚ. The Iron Guard, founded by Codreanu after his split with the LANC, put up Blank and Constantinescu's names on an enemies' list which also included Constantin Banu, Wilhelm Filderman, and Gheorghe Gh. Mârzescu. As reported by Argetoianu, Blank held the top position on that list, and was effectively marked for death. The Guard, along with other far-right groups, also singled out Adevărul and Dimineața as propaganda for anti-Romanian concepts.

In March 1925, Blank married Vota Vesnić, orphaned daughter of Yugoslav Premier Milenko Radomar Vesnić. Their Paris wedding was attended by numerous figures in politics and social life, including the then-Yugoslav Premier Nikola Pašić, Maharajah Jagatjit Singh, diplomat Nicolae Titulescu, banker Robert de Rothschild, and writers such as Marcel Prévost and Elena Văcărescu. A LANC newspaper covered the event, noting: "Blank must be reminded that this international and Jewified society does not impose itself on the Romanian public, who still feels the same way about him as those students who pummeled him out [...] in late March 1924." In honor of his new wife, Blank sometimes used the pseudonym Votaris, which combined their given names. In June 1926, she gave birth to the financier's son, Milenko Blank.

Also in March 1925, Iorga was enraged by Blank, who had presented a complete list of BMB sponsorships for Iorga's ventures; the two men parted ways. That same year, Carol was forced out of the country by the political establishment, but Blank continued to cultivate their relationship. As reported by Argetoianu, he effectively managed (and often misused) the Prince's bank accounts. This is partly backed by later historians: Mihai Oprițescu notes that Blank was betting on Carol's return; Claudiu Secașiu also notes that Blank and Carol enjoyed a "great rapport" in 1927, when Blank "supported him financially." Following the death of King Ferdinand I that same year, Carol was sidestepped in the succession list, and the throne went to his minor son Michael. A Council of Regents oversaw matters relating to the court; one of its members was Gheorghe Buzdugan, who, in 1929, declared having "particular high esteem for Aristide Blank, the banker who is a remarkable personality, a man with a big heart and a philanthropist."

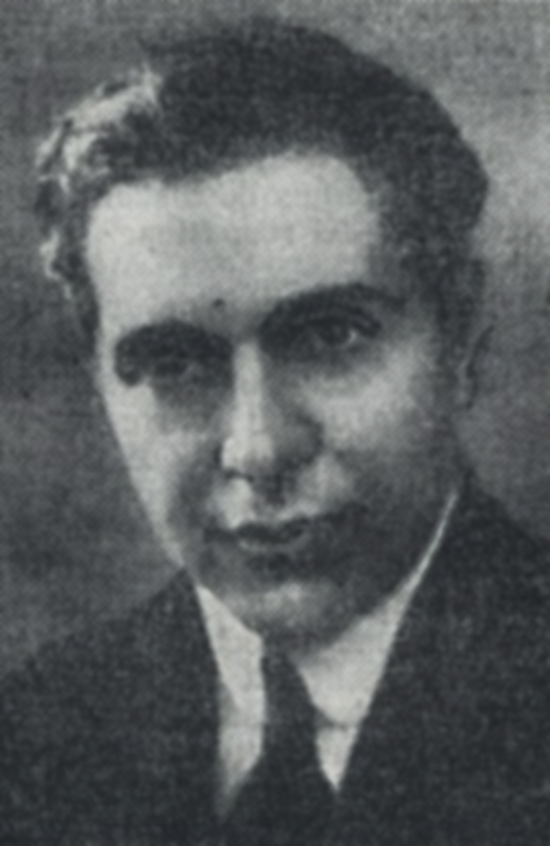
Blank in 1928

Mauriciu, who had withdrawn from active participation at the BMB, died at Vienna in November 1929, with Aristide organizing the funeral ceremony. Betina carried on with her philanthropic activities to her own death, in March 1930. Blank Jr was by then head of the BMB, allegedly because Mauriciu had overestimated his son's business acumen. According to Argetoianu, he went on to severely weaken the company with a project to destroy the National Liberals' influence in high finance, as well as with unwise investments—such as opening a BMB subsidiary on Place Vendôme. From 1923, the group had three additional international offices—in Istanbul, Vienna, and New York City. Sitting on the BMB's steering board, Argetoianu claimed to have observed the company having engaged virtually all of its available funds in investment schemes.

The company had troubles in the western Romanian city of Timișoara, where it had acquired control of Zsigmond Szana's local bank. In early 1928, he stepped in to obtain records of Szana's unsuccessful ventures in currency speculation, and demanded that he stop "lead[ing] him by the nose". Another issue hindering the bank's activities was the growing rivalry between Blank and his associate Richard de Söpkéz, with both engaged in drawing up capital on their respective side. According to Argetoianu, they each took at least 13.5 million lei in yearly stipends, while also collecting dividends from companies credited by the BMB, and through which Blank defrauded associates such as Ion G. Duca and George II of Greece. A later investigation suggested that Blank had used large sums of money for graft, and that his staff was engaged in accounting fraud.

=== BMB crash and royal protection ===
A September 1929 review in Revista Economică pointed out "conundrums" (buclucuri) having to do with the BMB's investments in industry. It also noted Blank's spreading of rumors that the state bank for industry, Creditul Industrial, needed to be restructured; allegations emerged that this was a deliberate attempt create market panic, so that a new Creditul could then refinance Blank's own projects. By 1930, the BMB had defaulted after registering 1.6 million lei in deficit. The enterprise went bankrupt in October 1931, immediately after being exposed to the consequences of the Great Depression—though, Argetoianu notes, the world crisis only served to obscure the effects of Blank's own managerial "insanity". This crash sparked a national scandal, after allegations that some investors had market moving information, allowing them to withdraw deposits in advance. Blank himself argued that withdrawals were made possible by rumors of a looming war between Romania and the Soviet Union, but his explanation failed to convince the general public. According to Argetoianu, Blank also complained that the investors' walkout was facilitated by the National Bank of Romania, whose Governor, Costin Stoicescu, was a disgruntled BMB employee. He believes that this claim was credible, in that Stoicescu always opposed state intervention in favor of the BMB.

Shortly before the BMB's crash, Carol returned home abruptly, deposing his son and taking over as King. As a result, Blank made his way into the camarilla, a secretive para-legal circle which decided on political and financial matters. Also frequenting this circle, Argetoianu noted that Blank was a second-wave inductee into the camarilla, arriving in at the same time as Tabacovici and "the pimp" Alexandru Mavrodi; but also that, during the first year of Carol's reign, he became his most influential adviser, to the point of "ruling over Romania". The same memoirist further contends that Blank and Carol shared a psychological pathology, namely "hyperacute sexual excitement" and "erotomania", which prevented them for going through with any project. He notes that Blank's vice, which required him to spend large sums for the sexual favors of "women who are into money and luxuries", ended with him going destitute and "half insane".

Blank continued his work as a literato, with the 1929 historical drama Satele lui Potemkin ("Potemkin's Villages"), which Faifer sees as echoing the theater of Luigi Pirandello. Showing an amorous triangle weaved into an "old Romanian fresco", it was in production at the National Theater Bucharest, with a noted performance by George Calboreanu. Blank was billed as "Andrei Dănescu". In 1933, Dimineața hosted Blank's "political fairy tale", Dialogul morților ("A Dialogue among the Dead"). A doctrinaire on economic matters, Blank served as a trustee of the Academy of Economic Studies (1929–1939), and also oversaw a committee for the administration of penal facilities (1930–1935). He continued to write newspaper articles, studies and memorials on Romania's postwar situation. His books include Contribuțiuni la rezolvarea crizei economice ("Contributions to Solving the Economic Crisis", 1922), La crise economique en Roumanie ("The Romanian Economic Crisis", 1922), Economice ("Economic Writings", 1932), Literare ("Literary Writings", 1932) and Problema monetară în raport cu creditul public și privat ("The Monetary Issue as Relates to Public and Private Credit"). Brederode was impressed by one of Blank's articles for Le Temps, describing the author as "highly competent and quite respected". Argetoianu describes such contributions as "childish inventions" and "theoretical jugglery", noting that "not even Tabacovici would read them"—but also that Carol was highly impressed, for being "entirely ignorant on financial and economic matters." The monarch also recognized Blank's achievements in the transportation, welcoming him into Meritul Aeronautic order of chivalry. This induction into a military fraternity, on par with that of professionals such as Vasile Rudeanu, was described as especially insulting by his old enemy Moța, who noted that the "Jewish populace is now nested within our army like a moth inside a piece of cloth".

As Argetoianu claims, the king eventually grew aware that Blank was not fully competent, but continued to seek his advice. Argetoianu argues that this was because Blank had since earned the confidence of Carol's lover Magda Lupescu, buying her a villa and making it so that she would befriend Tabacovici and Wieder. Reportedly, the only camarilla businessman who could still mitigate his influence at the court was Nicolae Malaxa. Like Malaxa and Max Auschnitt, Blank belonged to Meșterul Manole Lodge, a branch of Romanian Freemasonry which was intimately involved in sponsoring cultural projects by fellow Masons. In 1930, however, Blank gave up on his main investment in the cultural field, allowing Cultura Națională to be acquired by the State Printers and Monitorul Oficial. An anonymous report of the period claims that this liquidation resulted in massive payoffs for all the stakeholders, including Crainic and Puiu Dumitrescu. Two years later, Blank's CIDNA was taken over by the French state and became a component of the state carrier, Air France.

Argetoianu and Blank were instrumental in helping Carol reach a settlement with his former wife, Queen Helen. In January 1931, Argetoianu also sent Blank to approach Titulescu in St. Moritz, hoping to ensure his own political survival as part of a Titulescu cabinet. A rumor circulating at the time alleged that Titulescu owed 14 million lei to the BMB. The cabinet, which was never sworn in, was to include Blank as one of the ministers. In addition to endorsing Carol, Blank was going public as a critic of PNȚ governments in matters of economic policy. According to Grigore Gafencu, he was using Adevărul and the Carlist newspaper Cuvântul to criticize attempts at contracting a new loan in France. Blank and his colleagues described these as a sure path to economic enslavement. According to PNȚ man Ioan Hudiță, Gafencu was in fact Blank's connection inside both party and government. Hudiță reports several accounts according to which Blank had arranged Gafencu's wedding to an actress, and that she had earlier been his mistress. A later article by the communist C. Pavel indicates that this claim referred to Esmée Nouchette Gafencu, a professional dancer.

=== Camarilla clashes ===
A Iorga government was instead sworn in, with Argetoianu holding several ministerial portfolios. Over the following months, he and Blank came to clash over the issue of Romania's Alcohol Monopoly. Blank associated himself with the "international gangster" Reschnitzer to obtain a lease on that enterprise, but, Argetoianu reports, "didn't get anything out of it, because I myself stood in [their] way" (emphasis in the original). He recalls agreeing to give Reschnitzer's consortium a pre-emption right to the Monopoly, thus placating Blank, but also that he never actually intended to sell the company. The two camarilla figures were also at odds over Blank's creation of Discom, a private enterprise which served as a retailer for the Tobacco, Salt, and Matches Monopolies. Under his guidance, this business never produced an actual profit for the state, as most surpluses were drawn into covering BMB losses. The company was led by Aristide's nephew, Béla Blank-Csillag, who had squandered his own fortune while financing intrigues against the Greek Republic. Carol intervened to get Discom a share from the Alcohol Monopoly, as well as control over Loteria de Stat; through the king's pressures, the General Council of Bucharest also spent 500 million lei on acquiring Blank's allotment in Otopeni.

From early 1931, Blank allowed his "fantastically decorated palace" on Dionisie Street, Bucharest, to be used by the Romanian state for housing its more pretentious foreign guests—immediately after, it was a temporary home to Henri Deterding of the Royal Dutch/Shell, who was prospecting the local petroleum industry. In June of that year, Blank himself was dispatched to Berlin, kicking off trade negotiations between Romania and Weimar Germany. By then, the BMB affair had presented an opportunity for Manoilescu, also a camarilla man, who became Governor of the National Bank that same year. Manoilescu claimed that Argetoianu's demands for a bailout were feudal in nature, and could only serve to demolish whatever remained functional of Romania's industry and agriculture. According to Argetoianu, Manoilescu was "determined to destroy Aristide", unaware that the king had issued orders to protect Blank at all cost. The point is underscored by Pandrea, who also notes that a resentful Nae Ionescu played a part in forcing Manoilescu to push for Blank's bankruptcy.

In that context, Premier Iorga took Carol's side, writing in Neamul Românesc that the state had a moral duty to rescue Blank's business. As a BMB associate, Grigore Filipescu openly asked Manoilescu to refinance Blank's enterprise. Once his request was denied, he publicized Manoilescu's conflict of interest and pushed for an audit. Manoilescu sued him, alleging forgery, but failed to make his case in court. This parallel scandal continued to 1937, when Filipescu was able to demonstrate in front of a jury that Manoilescu, despite being publicly antisemitic, had been bribed by Jewish finance. As noted by Argetoianu, Blank and Manoilescu also continued to attack each other as "scoundrels and profiteers", and were equally right: "their readers should embrace [the respective] half of what each one writes down". Among the later authors, Oprițescu notes that Manoilescu was essentially right, and that Argetoianu, as a BMB stakeholder, was "try[ing] to profit from this situation".

The BMB crash, which brought down other banking institutions, convinced Argetoianu to legislate debt relief; however, when it emerged that Blank and Manoilescu were acting in bad faith, he made efforts not to bail out the bank itself, but merely contained the effects of its failure. As he reports, Stoicescu also played a part in this controversy. He "had poor Aristide grilled and spinning over burning coals", finally obtaining Blank's resignation and replacement with Söpkéz. His shares in the company were then handed in as a loan collateral to the Romanian state. As claimed by Argetoianu, Blank continued to defraud his own bank by cashing in a check for 43 million lei, which he then deposited for safekeeping with Blanche Ulman-Vesnić, his mother-in-law. He and Argetoianu, working together, collected a dossier showing Manoilescu's own history in illegal trading. Reassured by Carol's support, Blank was ultimately victorious and, as a result, Manoilescu lost his camarilla privileges in November 1931.

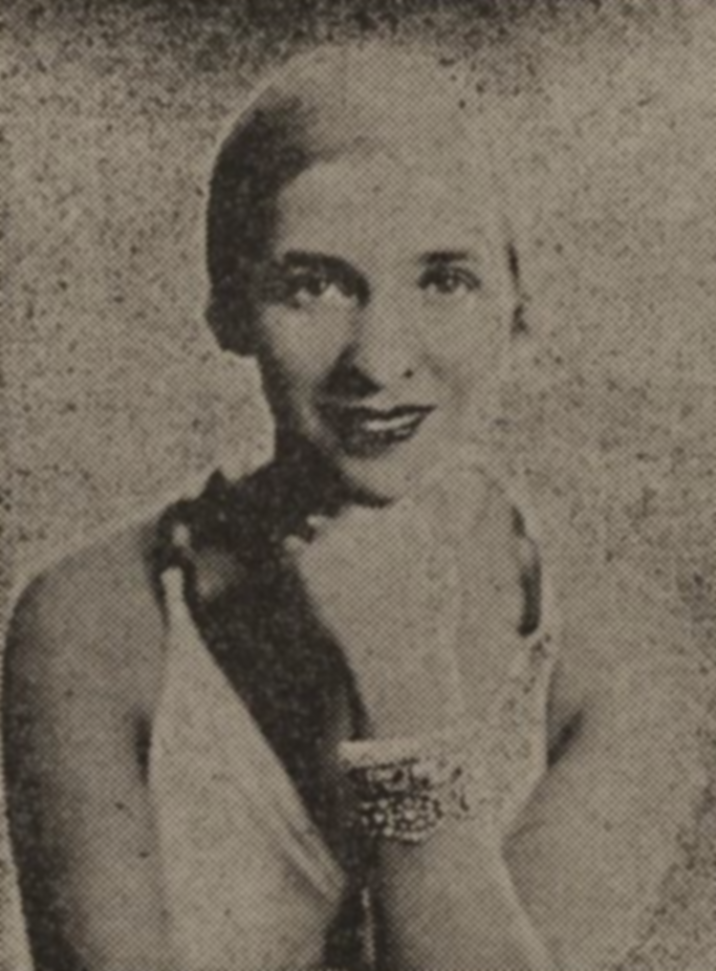
Blank's alleged mistress Leny Caler in 1934

Argetoianu himself was eventually replaced after proposing that the BMB merge with other credit enterprises into a single private entity supervised by the National Bank. As he reports, his fall was made possible by a businessmen's coalition, which included Manoilescu and "even the right honorable Aristide Blank"; the most vocal opposition came from smaller banks, which were threatened with liquidation. In 1932–1933, the National Bank refinanced the BMB, though the latter had to concede its shares in Discom; this operation failed to keep the enterprise afloat, and it was finally liquidated in 1936. During that interval, Béla Blank-Csillag had shot himself after losing his managerial position at Discom and returning to a bourgeois existence (that he reportedly detested). According to Mourat, Aristide "does not seem to have been seriously compromised" by BMB scandals, and continued to be credited by foreign investors, "keen on learning about the 'immense potential' of his rich country." Blank also preserved his standing in literary circles. He entertained and dined cultural figures, including writers Scarlat Froda and Mihail Sebastian—in his diaries, the latter refers to Blank as a "poser". According to Sebastian, Blank and Froda had threesomes with actress Leny Caler. Sebastian also claims to have had a sexual encounter with Blank's daughter Dorina, who "offered herself" to him.

=== Return and marginalization ===
As argued by Oprițescu, the "political dimension" of the BMB crash showed that Blank was in a position to blackmail Romania's elite, but also that Carol "grew tired of bankers". If Blank slowly lost his influence at the court, it was also because he no longer had enough funds left for sponsoring Carol's enrichment schemes. He also focused on philanthropic work, and, in 1933, opened up Caritas Hospital with a ceremony attended by Carol. By 1931, he was also involved in the project to elevate Eforie and Techirghiol into summer resorts, being responsible for the introduction of potable water and electricity, and constructing the first hotel and a modern road to reach it. He left the architectural planning to George Matei Cantacuzino, who envisaged the entire town as a Streamline Moderne project. A sport aficionado, in 1933 Vota organized a tennis tournament at the Blanks' own villa in Techirghiol. In June 1932, Elena Blank, who was Aristide's daughter from one of his earlier marriages, married judge Horia Bogdan.

Reportedly, Blank still had leverage in February 1935, when he obtained the sacking of Finance Minister Victor Slăvescu. He could also communicate his views with articles in Universul daily—the paradox was highlighted at the time by journalist István Bálint, who noted that the newspaper was otherwise antisemitic. A Transylvanian magazine, Ellenőr, commented on Blank's return an economic expert, seeing it as an insolent act: "our press and above all those in charge should teach Aristid Blank a lesson, namely that he has no authority to produce statements on public finances. If Mr Aristid Blank had not so carefully demarcated his huge private wealth from his bank house, which is also his property but operates on a separate joint stock company basis, and had not also been living with the splendor of an Oriental maharaja, he would have paid back those millions". In preparation for Slăvescu's sacking, Blank had published an op ed in Universul of January 28, detailing his own solutions to economic problems. In his diaries, Argetoianu referred to his contribution as "intelligent, though occasionally veering into utopia." The two were again on friendly terms, since, as Argetoianu argued, "it's better to have him on my side then against me." He heard Blank's "interesting plan" for developing tourism in Romania. Blank also expressed an interest in funding Haig Acterian's project to pioneer television in Romania, then supported creating an Italo–Romanian film company under Cines, but ultimately withdrew from both.

According to historian Grigore Traian Pop, in 1934 Blank and Victor Iamandi also worked to undermine Carol's protege Auschnitt, by depicting him as a sponsor of the Iron Guard; Pop sees the allegation as false. Argetoianu noted that Blank's political agenda involved keeping a low profile, but also that he was regaining his influence on Lupescu, even as Wieder was losing his. He reports that Carol's sister, Elisabeth Charlotte, detested Blank and Malaxa, asking her brother to remove them from his entourage; Carol allegedly replied that he had a set of obligations toward Blank. Also according to Argetoianu, Blank's intrigues also resulted in Mitiță Constantinescu's appointment as Governor of the National Bank, who then proceeded to persecute investor Oskar Kaufmann, Elisabeth's alleged lover. Constantinescu and Blank formed a clique which opposed Slăvescu's attempts to regain control of credit institutions, and obtained conditional support from Premier Gheorghe Tătărescu. This conflict reflected splits inside the PNL, between Tătărescu and Dinu Brătianu's factions (the latter of which included Slăvescu).

At the time, Argetoianu claimed to have discovered Blank's actual stake in such affairs—namely, that he hoped Constantinescu would allow the BMB to survive by returning it control over Discom, which had remained profitable. In March 1934, the newspaper Credința "launched an extremely violent attack on Aristid Blank", publishing revelations that he had been transferring his personal debt to Discom, "so that he is now free of encumbrances." Argetoianu looked back on 1935 as the worst year in Romanian history, only similar to the period of Ottoman dominion over the Danubian Principalities: "It would still appear as the better alternative to be trampled on by the Padishah than by that Yid Aristid Blank or the alms-giver Malaxa." As reported to Argetoianu by Elisabeth's lover, Sandi Scanavi, Blank was deemed "public enemy number 1" by the conservative establishment, with Malaxa a close second. In early 1936, Argetoianu claims, Blank was the "real master of this Romanian land", but had also registered a defeat when Slăvescu returned to the National Bank leadership. When Kaufmann began a legal battle against journalist Alfred Hefter, Argetoianu argued that the latter was being paid to calumny by Blank. As he noted: "that the bankrupt Blank has enough money on him to get Hefter moving, that is after all his own business, and at most something that would interest the prosecutor's office. The plot thickens and the issue turns messy because Mitiță Constantinescu also gets involved into this personal conflict, and that the wheeler-dealer Aristid goes out of his way to also involve the King" (emphasis in the original).

On the night of May 4–5, 1936, an Iron Guard youth narrowly missed a chance to assassinate Blank outside Hefter's editorial offices, and, out of frustration, physically assaulted Hefter himself; in the aftermath, Blank spread rumors that the attempt was a false flag operation by Kaufmann's own clique. A month later, he and Șeicaru reacted against their rival Ionescu, who had been identified as an agent of influence for Nazi Germany. They presented Carol with a copy of the incriminating letter, which Carlist Ion Sân-Giorgiu allegedly took to Berlin "and showed it to a number of ministers there." By August, Blank was reportedly attempting to gather support for a "strongman government" that would quell Guardist agitation, and proposed either Argetoianu or Alexandru Averescu for the premiership. In January 1937, British plenipotentiary Reginald Hoare left comments on Blank's newfound enthusiasm for regaining control of the BMB, as well as on his limited competence. Also according to Argetoianu, Vota had left Aristide, and, in October 1936, was living with Radu Polizu in Monaco. An inveterate gambler, Polizu allegedly relied on her for money.

In June 1937, the Guardist paper Buna Vestire announced that the anti-internationalist drift of European politics, also manifested in the Soviet Great Purge, was a bane for the "social and political systems born out of conspiratorial Judaism's boorish and anti-historic spirit". This meant bad news for Romanian democrats, including "Aristide Blank's cronies". Blank and Auschnitt, together with Filderman and Armand Călinescu, had by then drafted a plan for the mass emigration of Romanian Jews to Mandatory Palestine. This attempt to settle the issue was foiled by German and British opposition. By 1939, the National Bank had taken over the BMB's patrimony. Blank also lost his father's home on Dionisie Street, which was bought by Eduard Mirto, and then leased to the American Legation. Following national elections in December 1937 and a resulting hung parliament, Carol allowed the fascist National Christian Party, a successor of the LANC, to form government; Blank's erstwhile friend, Octavian Goga, took over as Premier. As reported by Sebastian, the passage of antisemitic legislation was played down by Blank, who argued that the "continuation of the Goga government" was in then Jews' best interest, since "what would come after it would be infinitely worse."

=== Outcast and hostage ===
Adevărul was finally banned on Goga's orders. After Carol engineered a self-coup and formed the National Renaissance Front, Blank made attempts to regain his standing in political life. He followed Carol on his final trip to Britain in November 1938, and was registered with the royal retinue at Claridge's of London. This prompted Argetoianu to comment that Carol was still unable to renounce his "gang of tricksters", comprising Blank, Hefter, and Eugen Titeanu. He reports meeting the "all-too-serene" Blank visiting the Wallace Collection alongside diplomat Dimitrie N. Ciotori: "I never asked him why he was in London: I don't doubt for a moment that he's here to pick up scraps from the table that's being set for King Carol". Blank returned to publishing with two other plays. Iarna la Hangerli ("Winter at Hagerli's"), a sample of historical theater, was partly taken up in Viața Românească in 1939; Rhapsodie des dieux ("Gods' Rhapsody", which is Blank's take on the Odyssey, noted by Faifer for its interxtual refinement) was published entirely in 1940.

In Romania, the outbreak of World War II saw the generalization of antisemitic laws, followed in 1940 the premiership of a hardliner, Ion Gigurtu. As reported by Sebastian, news of his ascendancy struck his "millionaire friends" Blank and A. L. Zissu, who were "terrified and cracking up", but who still pestered him with "abstract conversations." In late August, the Gigurtu cabinet corrected a slip-up by previous antisemites, removing Blank from the Bucharest bar—though he was no longer practicing law, in any form. Such radicalization was followed in September by Carol's ouster, and afterward by the establishment of an Iron Guard-led "National Legionary State". This new regime blocked all of Blank's Romanian assets in October 1940, and instituted a special commission for re-litigating the BMB affair. General Ion Antonescu, who supervised the Guard as Conducător, also ordered Discom to be broken up. Official reports presented Discom as "a business venture of the Jew Aristide Blanc and of some politicians, most notably Const[antin] Argetoianu", also recounting that it had defrauded the state to the tune of "many a million." In January 1941, the Guard rebelled and was ousted by Antonescu. Before and during the clashes, the Guardists intensified antisemitic terror. A female member of the family, whom doctor Arthur Meiersohn identifies as Aristide's mother, was among those targeted, and attempted suicide with an overdose of phenobarbital.

The investigative commission resumed work after the events, and determined that Aristide owed the Romanian state 600 million lei. Frequenting the left-wing journalist Tudor Teodorescu-Braniște in April 1941, Blank expressed confidence that Germany would lose in its war with Yugoslavia. Both he and his host resigned themselves by June, when Blank also circulated rumors about Romania's imminent participation in the invasion of Soviet territory. He still owned a paper mill, which was ordered to prepare for distribution in Bessarabia. According to Sebastian, Blank argued in late 1941 that the war would only last for two more years, but was then "disgusted at the British lack of seriousness in Libya." Blank had by then sent his son to study abroad, in the United States. After a while being stranded with his mother in the Portuguese Republic, Milenko managed to sail out of Europe; he took American citizenship and returned with the United States Army. Blank's older son, Patrice, was a graduate of the ELSP. He remained active during the Nazi occupation and joined the French Resistance, serving as organizer and publicist of the Défense de la France insurgent group. Actress Hélène Duc, who sheltered him in her home, reports that Patrice hid his Romanian ancestry from his colleagues, generally presenting himself as a grandson of Vladimir Lenin. Economist Michel Drancourt, who met him later in life, recounts that he was always discreet about his distant past, though he sometimes reflected "on the importance of his family bank in Romania".

In 1943, Romania's Ministry of Finance sued Aristide Blank for the recovery of his assets, and obtained a foreclosure of his property on Berthelot Street, outside Cișmigiu. According to one report, Blank left Romania in 1941, together with members of the British Legation. However, Sebastian's accounts place him in Bucharest in 1942–1943, noting that his library was being seized by Romanian authorities on orders from Paul Sterian. In late 1942 or early 1943, Blank was included on a list of Jewish hostages, presented by the Central Jewish Office as a guarantee of its loyalism toward the Antonescu regime; also featured were writers Henric Streitman and Iosif Brucăr. In early 1943, Sebastian notes, Blank was "looking for some refuge in the countryside." He finally left Bucharest in April, at the peak of Allied bombing raids, and by June was living in Butimanu.

The family's fortunes were restored in August 1944, which saw both the Liberation of Paris and the King Michael's Coup. Patrice emerged from the underground to serve as the youngest member of the Provisional Consultative Assembly. He also served on the original editorial board of France-Soir, before being expelled and sued for mismanagement in 1949. In 1944 Romania, the Jewish community still looked up to Blank Sr, believing him worthy of becoming the country's Minister of Finance. In January 1945, Blank (whose domicile was on Ferdinand Boulevard) reopened Cultura Națională as its majority stockholder. His new associates on this project were Teodorescu-Braniște, Sebastian, J. A. Steriadi, and Alexandru Rosetti. In July 1945, România Liberă, as a central organ of the Romanian Communist Party (PCR), published his proposals for a progressive tax, whereby the rich would have financed Romania's post-armistice debt.

=== Convict and emigrant ===
From 1946, Blank rejoined the ranks of Romania's Freemasonry, which was reemerging after years of repression; this time around, he became an affiliate of Lanțul de Unire Lodge, under Horia Hulubei. The group, which also included Auschnitt, Malaxa, Nicolae Ciupercă, Emil Ghilezan and Mihail Ghelmegeanu, was highly selective, to the point where its activities were kept secret from other Romanian Lodges. Blank also helped Rosetti and Ionel Jianu with printing an art magazine, Lumină și Culoare. With Galaction, Teodorescu-Braniște, Rosetti, Petre Ghiață, Isaia Răcăciuni, Valentin Saxone, and Ion Vinea, he set up a liberal-democratic club, Ideea. In April 1946, the Court of Cassation cancelled the debt owed by Blank, finding that the Antonescu regime had misruled on this issue.

Blank persisted in attempting to have the BMB assets returned to him, initially by cultivating National Peasantists such as Hudiță, but later focusing his efforts on the more powerful PCR. As part of this approach, he joined the Romanian Society for Friendship with the Soviet Union and presided over its Financial Section. Initially, Blank obtained support from a Communist Party leader, Ana Pauker, who was an in-law of his Adevărul colleagues. In October 1945, she allowed him to access BMB funds, with Blank promising that he was going to fully repay his creditors. However, Blank also protected his family from the communist threat, sending Vota to live with Milenko in the United States; he visited them there in 1946, but opted to return to Romania in January 1947. In May 1946, he had been elected into the Romanian Writers' Society, as part of a mass induction that also included Jianu, Pandrea, Răcăciuni, Marcel Breslașu, Sorana Gurian, Lucrețiu Pătrășcanu, Eugen Relgis, Mihail Sevastos, Eugen Schileru, Ștefan Tita, and Constant Tonegaru. In September 1947, he was included on a provisional commission supervising the Romanian publishers' association—where he was again colleagues with Rosetti, but also with Eusebiu Camilar, Petre Năvodaru, and Cicerone Theodorescu. In reviewing this decision, the left-wing paper Viața Sindicală noted that all those serving on the body were "guarantees that the issue of publishing houses and the healthy purpose of books will be steered along the justest path".

One of Blank's final activities at Cultura Națională was putting out the first edition of Pavel Chihaia's novel, Blocada, which was immediately removed from bookshops by communist censors. The publishing house was shut down that same year. Blank himself was eventually singled out for retribution after having maintained contacts with British and American diplomats. He witnessed the proclamation of a communist republic in 1948, by which time he had lost touch with his Western backers. That year, the BMB was nationalized (though it continued to exist as a separate entity, under state management, to 1951); the company's former offices, a granite building on Doamnei Street, were taken by Romania's new secret police, the Securitate. Blank himself was arrested as a spy on April 18, 1952, and put on trial for high treason with his meeting with foreigners and some of his papers used as evidence, then sentenced to a 20-year imprisonment in May 1953. At the time, his rival Manoilescu had also been identified as an enemy of the communist regime, and was sent to the labor colony of Ocnele Mari. Here, he met Pandrea, who recalls: "I made him recount the Blank bankruptcy, as a way of entertaining xenophobic inmates".

Memoirist Ion Ioanid, who was held with Blank in Jilava Prison for a while in 1954, recalls that the financier was well groomed, and still wearing a two-piece suit. According to Ioanid, Blank missed his son Milenko, whom he believed he would never see again, but resented him for choosing a career in the army: "I feel like a hen that's been hatching a duck's egg!" Children from his other marriages had stayed behind in Romania. Reportedly, one of his daughters, Tina Stănescu, had married a mayor of Buzău, and was still living at Sinaia in the late 1940s, shunning all relations with less assimilated Jews. Novelist Matei Călinescu remembers that one of Blank's former wives was living at a part-nationalized villa in Floreasca in 1954, alongside her daughter, Elena Blank-Bogdan (known to Călinescu as Helen), and two granddaughters, Mab and Manola. Elena's husband Horia was also serving a jail term. Another one of Blank's former wives, Ecaterina Caragiale (married Logadi), was also a prisoner around 1952.

Blank's defense team was able to show that his conversations with foreigners were not covered by the Penal Code, and that papers found in his home and used against him in his trial were actually the early drafts of a novel. In April 1955, his conviction for treason was overturned, and commuted into a three-year sentence for mishandling national secrets; he had by then served the equivalent in Jilava and Pitești prisons, and was consequently set free. Blank's health was compromised, and, having been made an Officer of the Legion of Honor before 1925, he relied on medical support from the French Embassy. His visits brought him attention by Securitate operatives, and he was placed under surveillance. Throughout the late 1950s, Blank made several requests for an emigration visa to France, supported in this by the French government and Zionist groups responding to Vota's appeals; in 1956, a delegation of the French National Assembly visited him in Bucharest. Blank was also assisted by his other son Patrice, who returned to publishing after making and losing a fortune in the trade of precious metals. All of his father's applications for emigration were denied by the Romanian side until March 1958, when he was finally allowed to leave for Paris. Aristide Blank died there on January 1, 1960, his official birthday.

== Posterity ==
Patrice Blank reportedly married a Rothschild and lived a life of luxury, but continued to be active in politics. Like his friend Bertrand de Jouvenel, he spoke out against the French economic mainstream, advocating right-libertarianism; this agenda was promoted by his own magazine, Liaisons Sociales, as well as by Commentaire journal and Saint-Simon Foundation, both of which he financed. His parallel advocacy for the United States of Europe brought him into conflict with Charles de Gaulle, but also ensured support from Joseph Rovan. As noted by lawyer Jacques Sinard, Patrice was also a promoter of common-law marriage from a Europeanist and liberal perspective. He was still active in publishing into the 1990s, as owner of the Liaisons group; he sold it to Wolters Kluwer in 1996.

Aristide's son died in Paris, aged 73, on October 14, 1998, having just inaugurated a new libertarian magazine, Sociétal. He enjoys a posthumous fame as a central figure in conspiracy theories about the death of Robert Boulin in October 1979. According to these, Boulin was killed by his colleagues in the Rally for the Republic, because he had compromising information regarding party finances; Blank Jr is depicted as having absconded with Boulin's personal files just after his death was announced.
