= Puiu =

Puiu (Romanian pronunciation: [ˈpuju]) is both a Romanian masculine given name and a surname. Notable people with the name include:

- Cristi Puiu (born 1967), Romanian film director and screenwriter
- Visarion Puiu (1879–1964), Romanian Orthodox bishop
- Puiu Dumitrescu, private secretary to King Carol II
- Puiu Hașotti (born 1953), Romanian politician
- Puiu Manu (born 1928), Romanian graphic designer and comic book creator

== See also ==
- Puiești (disambiguation)
