= Puiești =

Puieşti may refer to several places in Romania:

- Puieşti, a commune in Buzău County
- Puieşti, a commune in Vaslui County

== See also ==
- Puiu (name)
