= Nicolae Tabacovici =

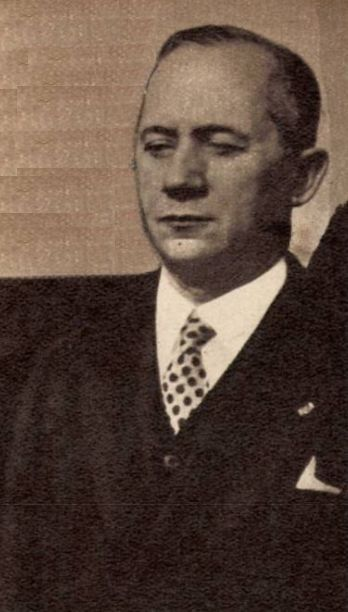
- Realitatea Ilustrată magazine, 1935
- Born: 1881
- Died: 1973 (aged 91–92)
- Education: University of Leipzig
- Occupations: president of the administrative council and economic director of Căile Ferate Române,

Nicolae Tabacovici (1881–1973) was a Romanian businessman of the 1930s.

In 1913, he earned a doctorate in mathematics from the University of Leipzig. His dissertation was titled Die Statistik der Einkommensverteilung mit besonderer Rücksicht auf das Königreich Sachsen (“The Statistics of Income Distribution, with Special Regard to the Kingdom of Saxony”).

One of the directors of the Marmorosch Blank Bank, he was brought into King Carol II’s camarilla through the intervention of Aristide Blank, the bank's owner. A highly adaptable figure, he gained the complete trust of the king and his mistress, Elena Lupescu. The couple arranged for him to become president of the administrative council and economic director of Căile Ferate Române, the state railway carrier.
