= Mauriciu Blank =

Romanian banker

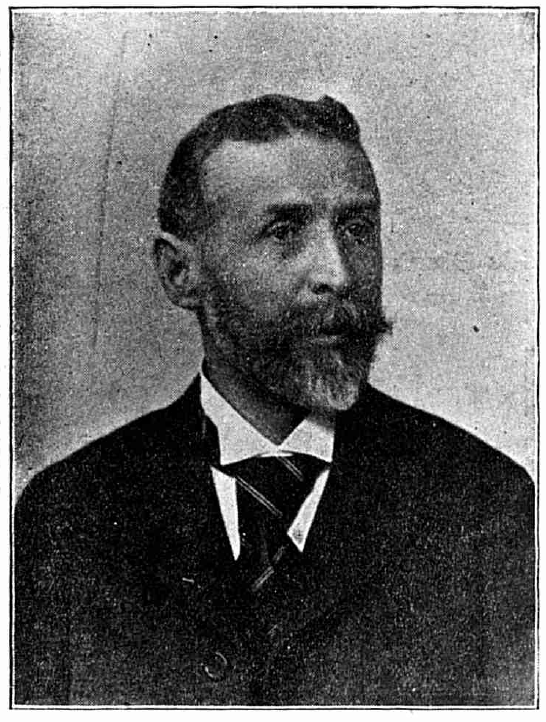
Mauriciu Blank

Mauriciu Blank (c. 1848 – November 22, 1929) was a Romanian banker, co-founder, alongside Iacob Marmorosch, of the Marmorosch Blank Bank. His son was Aristide Blank.
