= The Sholan Alliance =

Lisanne Norman sci-fi novel series

The Sholan Alliance series is a series of nine science fiction novels written by Scottish author Lisanne Norman.

== Books ==
The Sholan Alliance series consists of:

1. Turning Point (ISBN 0886775752)
2. Fortune's Wheel (ISBN 0886776759)
3. Fire Margins (ISBN 0886777186)
4. Razor's Edge (ISBN 0886777666)
5. Dark Nadir (ISBN 0886778298)
6. Stronghold Rising (ISBN 0886778980)
7. Between Darkness and Light (ISBN 0756400155)
8. Shades of Gray (ISBN 9780756401993)
9. Circle's End (ISBN 0756408555)

Turning Point was originally conceived as an independent short story about a black cat walking through the snow. The author has written a number of short stories set within the series' setting.
