= Mihail Săulescu =

Romanian poet and playwright (1888–1916)

Mihail Săulescu (23 February 1888 – 30 September(?), 1916) was a Romanian poet and playwright.

Born in Bucharest, he was the fourth child (out of seventeen, of whom nine survived) born to Captain Nicolae Săulescu (known as the Romanian Army's official painter) and his wife Ecaterina (née Gaist). From 1898 to 1903, he studied at Saint Sava and Matei Basarab high schools in his native city. Săulescu then entered the Conservatory of Dramatic Art, quitting in 1904 after his first year. Leaving Bucharest, he worked as a teacher in Gorj County and a substitute in Posada, Prahova County in 1908. In 1911, he was an editor at Luceafărul magazine in Sibiu, then a part of Austria-Hungary. After returning to the Romanian capital, he was editor at Rampa (1911–1912), librarian at the Socec folk library (1912–1913), clerk at the Public Instruction Ministry, junior clerk at Casa Școalelor cultural foundation and editor at Rampa nouă ilustrată (1914). In 1908, he was a founding member of the Romanian Writers' Union.

Săulescu's published debut came in 1906, with verses published in Sămănătorul, although he did not belong to the circle affiliated with that magazine. The same year, in Bucharest, he published a book of poetry, Versuri, but later disavowed it and ordered the entire printing destroyed. No known copy survives. Several of the poems in this volume appeared in the two that followed: Departe… (1914) and Viața (1916). Besides Sămănătorul, he contributed to Convorbiri Critice (where he was an active participant in the group, led by Mihail Dragomirescu), Seara, Universul literar, Noua revistă română, Rampa and Rampa nouă ilustrată.

Strongly in favor of Romania's entry into World War I on the Allied side, he insisted on enlisting as a volunteer when this did occur in the summer of 1916. Săulescu was enrolled in a "mobile division" tasked with rapid interventions. He soon died at the front near Predeal. He left behind a poetry volume, Cultul morților, in manuscript form; this was published in autumn 1916. Also among his papers were a lengthy poem, "Călătorii" (modeled after Mihail Eminescu's "Memento mori") and two stage plays. At the National Theater Bucharest, for the 1921–1922 season, Victor Eftimiu presented Săulescu's one-act Săptămâna luminată, written in a single night in 1913 and published in 1922. It met with unusual success, with some critics hailing it as holding greater value that Ion Luca Caragiale's Năpasta. Another play, În fața mării, was inspired by Henrik Ibsen. By all appearances written in 1911–1912, it was published in 1973.
