= Lisanne Norman =

Lisanne Norman (born 15 February 1951 in Glasgow, Scotland) is a science fiction author. She is best known as the author of The Sholan Alliance series. She was trained as a teacher.

== Bibliography ==
- Turning Point, Book 1 of the Sholan Alliance series, first published December 1993, ISBN 0-88677-575-2
- Fortune's Wheel, Book 2 of the Sholan Alliance series, first published August 1995, ISBN 0-88677-675-9
- Fire Margins, Book 3 of the Sholan Alliance series, first published November 1996, ISBN 0-88677-718-6
- Razor's Edge, Book 4 of the Sholan Alliance series, first published December 1997, ISBN 0-88677-766-6
- Dark Nadir, Book 5 of the Sholan Alliance series, first published March 1999, ISBN 0-88677-829-8
- Stronghold Rising, Book 6 of the Sholan Alliance series, first published June 2000, ISBN 0-88677-898-0
- Between Darkness and Light, Book 7 of the Sholan Alliance series, first published January 2003, ISBN 0-7564-0015-5
- Shades of Gray, Book 8 of the Sholan Alliance series, first published August 2010, ISBN 978-0-7564-0199-3
- Circle's End, Book 9 of the Sholan Alliance series, first published September 2017 ISBN 978-0-7564-0855-8
