= Puiu Dumitrescu =

Secretary of King Carol II of Romania (King of Romania)

Constantin “Puiu” Dumitrescu was the secretary to King Carol II of Romania.

In the 1920s, while in exile in Paris, Prince Carol hired Dumitrescu as his private secretary. The latter was a law student at the University of Paris; his father, general Constantin Dumitrescu, was in charge of military recruitment at Constanța. Wily and well informed, Puiu quickly earned the prince's confidence. He was convinced that the royal was being persecuted by the old political guard for his modernizing ideas. He sought to rally a large number of politicians and businessmen around his boss, promising rewarding positions at the heights of state and economy. This was the nucleus of an emerging royal camarilla.

Retained after Carol took the throne in 1930, Dumitrescu ended up the second-ranked figure in the camarilla, behind royal mistress Elena Lupescu. He received and send correspondence, and was the king's spokesman in his relations with politicians. An unscrupulous figure, he did not hesitate to obtain from Carol an appointment for his father as inspector general of the Romanian Gendarmerie. An admirer of the Iron Guard, in mid-1933 he successfully advised the king not to dissolve the fascist movement by royal decree, as proposed by foreign minister Nicolae Titulescu.

Dumitrescu's position had become untenable by early 1934. His ambivalent attitude to the assassination of Ion G. Duca and his relations with the Guard convinced the king to heed the request of Lupescu and fire Dumitrescu. Having reached a dizzying level of power and convinced that he was unassailable, the secretary had begun to believe that anything was permitted him. He even told the king that Lupescu, due to her luxurious lifestyle and haughty attitude, was creating a bad image domestically and abroad, and should be sent outside the country for a longer period of time. Moreover, the royal mistress had turned against Dumitrescu in the summer of 1933, when he began an affair with the widow Ella Manu. While Lupescu was on good terms with Dumitrescu's wife Jenny, she feared Manu. Moreover, the king came under pressure from his foreign minister, Titulescu, to fire his secretary.

Thus, in March 1934, Carol dismissed Dumitrescu, asking him to leave Romania. He settled in France, where he avoided politics altogether. All his subsequent efforts to re-enter the king's good graces, including groveling missives, came to nought. In May 1935, Dumitrescu's father was sent to prison for corruption offenses, dying shortly thereafter. His son's request for an autopsy was denied, leading to rumors of poisoning.
